= Larkana Division =

Administrative division of Sindh

Coordinates: 27.5606°N 68.2068°E

Larkana Division لاڑکانہ ڈویژن لاڙڪانو ڊويزن
- Division
- Interactive map of Larkana Division
- Country: Pakistan
- Province: Sindh
- Capital: Larkana
- Established: 1980
- Founder: Sindh Government

Government
  - Type: Divisional Administration
  - Commissioner: Dr. Rasheed Masood
  - Regional Police Officer: N/A

Area
  - Division: 15,213 km^{2} (5,874 sq mi)

Population (2023)
  - Division: 7,093,706
  - Density: 466.29/km^{2} (1,207.7/sq mi)
  - Urban: 2,172,453 (30.64%)
  - Rural: 4,921,253 (69.36%)

Literacy 2023
  - Literacy rate: Total: (44.53%); Male: (53.89%); Female: (34.63%)

Larkana Division (Sindhi: لاڙڪانو ڊويزن) is an administrative division of the Sindh Province of Pakistan. It is located in Northern Sindh which is locally called the Uttrad Region. It was created in 1980 by bifurcation of Sukkur Division. In 2000 abolished by General Pervaiz Musharraf rule but Sindh government restored it again on 11 July 2011. CNIC code of Larkana Division is 43.

Larkana is the divisional headquarters of Larkana Division. It comprises the following districts:

- Larkana
- Jacobabad
- Kashmore
- Qambar Shahdadkot
- Shikarpur

== Demographics ==
Historical population
Year	Pop.	±% p.a.
1951	...	—
1961	...	—
1972	...	—
1981	2,746,201	—
1998	4,210,650	+2.55%
2017	6,192,380	+2.05%
2023	7,093,706	+2.29%

According to 2023 census, Larkana division had a population of 7,093,706 roughly equal to the population of Serbia or the US state of Massachusetts.

== List of the Districts ==
#	District	Headquarter	Area (km²)	Pop. (2023)	Density (ppl/km²) (2023)	Lit. rate (2023)
1	Larkana	Larkana	1,948	1,784,453	915.8	55.58%
2	Jacobabad	Jacobabad	2,698	1,174,097	434.0	42.34%
3	Kashmore	Kandhkot	2,580	1,233,957	477.3	35.59%
4	Qambar Shahdadkot	Qambar	5,475	1,514,869	276.4	40.02%
5	Shikarpur	Shikarpur	2,512	1,386,330	552.1	43.70%

== List of the Tehsils ==
Tehsil	Area (km²)	Population (2023)	Density (ppl/km²)	Literacy rate (2023)	Districts
Garhi Khairo Tehsil	733	193,297	263.72	45.58%	Jacobabad District
Jacobabad Tehsil	664	447,647	674.11	45.47%	Jacobabad District
Thul Tehsil	1,301	533,153	409.81	38.53%	Jacobabad District
Kandhkot Tehsil	654	407,592	623.23	37.91%	Kashmore District
Kashmore Tehsil	1,262	487,601	386.37	32.65%	Kashmore District
Tangwani Tehsil	664	338,764	510.19	36.95%	Kashmore District
Bakrani Tehsil	425	275,268	647.69	46.38%	Larkana District
Dokri Tehsil	412	257,394	624.74	49.19%	Larkana District
Larkana Tehsil	549	873,868	1,591.74	58.76%	Larkana District
Ratodero Tehsil	562	377,923	672.46	58.93%	Larkana District
Mirokhan Tehsil	374	182,461	487.92	33.41%	Qambar Shahdadkot District
Nasirabad Tehsil	309	174,708	565.47	41.81%	Qambar Shahdadkot District
Qambar Tehsil	2,260	448,990	198.67	39.36%	Qambar Shahdadkot District
Qubo Saeed Khan Tehsil	1,033	99,308	96.13	26.46%	Qambar Shahdadkot District
Shahdadkot Tehsil	419	225,086	537.53	47.06%	Qambar Shahdadkot District
Sijawal Junejo Tehsil	385	130,635	339.31	37.66%	Qambar Shahdadkot District
Warah Tehsil	695	253,681	365.01	44.25%	Qambar Shahdadkot District
Garhi Yasin Tehsil	971	333,289	343.24	42.76%	Shikarpur District
Khanpur Tehsil	629	331,219	526.58	29.41%	Shikarpur District
Lakhi Tehsil	351	300,490	856.10	49.43%	Shikarpur District
Shikarpur Tehsil	561	421,332	751.04	50.99%	Shikarpur District

== Constituencies ==
Provincial Assembly Constituency	National Assembly Constituency	District
PS-1 Jacobabad-I	NA-190 Jacobabad	Jacobabad
PS-2 Jacobabad-II	NA-190 Jacobabad	Jacobabad
PS-3 Jacobabad-III	NA-190 Jacobabad	Jacobabad
PS-4 Kashmore-I	NA-191 Jacobabad-cum-Kashmore	Kashmore
PS-5 Kashmore-II	NA-191 Jacobabad-cum-Kashmore	Kashmore
PS-6 Kashmore-III	NA-191 Jacobabad-cum-Kashmore	Kashmore
PS-7 Shikarpur-I	NA-192 Kashmore-cum-Shikarpur	Shikarpur
PS-8 Shikarpur-II	NA-192 Kashmore-cum-Shikarpur	Shikarpur
PS-9 Shikarpur-III	NA-193 Shikarpur	Shikarpur
PS-10 Larkana-I	NA-194 Larkana-I	Larkana
PS-11 Larkana-II	NA-194 Larkana-I	Larkana
PS-12 Larkana-III	NA-195 Larkana-II	Larkana
PS-13 Larkana-IV	NA-195 Larkana-II	Larkana
PS-14 Qambar Shahdadkot-I	NA-196 Qambar Shahdadkot-I	Qambar Shahdadkot
PS-15 Qambar Shahdadkot-II	NA-196 Qambar Shahdadkot-I	Qambar Shahdadkot
PS-16 Qambar Shahdadkot-III	NA-197 Qambar Shahdadkot-II	Qambar Shahdadkot
PS-17 Qambar Shahdadkot-IV	NA-197 Qambar Shahdadkot-II	Qambar Shahdadkot

== See also ==
- Divisions of Pakistan
  - Divisions of Balochistan
  - Divisions of Khyber Pakhtunkhwa
  - Divisions of Punjab
  - Divisions of Sindh
  - Divisions of Azad Kashmir
  - Divisions of Gilgit-Baltistan
- Jacobabad District
- Larkana District
- Kashmore District
- Qambar Shahdadkot District
- Shikarpur District
- Larkana
- Siro (Region)
