= NA-196 Qambar Shahdadkot-I =

Constituency of the National Assembly of Pakistan

- Constituency for the National Assembly of Pakistan
- Region: Qubo Saeed Khan, Shahdadkot, Sijawal Junejo, Mirokhan Tehsils and Qambar Tehsil (partly) of Qambar Shahdadkot District
- Electorate: 417,740

Current constituency
- Created: 2018
- Party: Pakistan People's Party
- Member: Khursheed Ahmed Junejo
- Created from: NA-206 (Larkana-III); NA-207 (Larkana-IV)

NA-196 Qambar Shahdadkot-I (این اے-196، قمبرشہدادکوٹ-1) is a newly-created constituency for the National Assembly of Pakistan. It mainly comprises the Qubo Saeed Khan Taluka, Shahdadkot Taluka, Sijawal Junejo Taluka, and Miro Khan Taluka. It was created in the 2018 delimitation after the constituency overlapping between Qambar Shahdadkot District and Larkana District was ended.

== Assembly Segments ==
| Constituency number | Constituency | District | Current MPA | Party |
|---|---|---|---|---|
| 14 | PS-14 Qambar Shahdadkot-I | Qambar Shahdadkot District | Mir Nadir Ali Khan Magsi | PPP |
| 15 | PS-15 Qambar Shahdadkot-II | Qambar Shahdadkot District | Nisar Khuhro | PPP |

== Election 2018 ==
General elections were held on 25 July 2018.

General election 2018: NA-202 Qambar Shahdadkot-I
| Party | Candidate | Votes | % | ±% |
|---|---|---|---|---|
| PPP | Aftab Shaban Mirani | 72,159 | 56.39 | |
| MMA | Nasir Mehmood | 36,046 | 28.17 | |
| PTI | Musarrat Shah | 9,631 | 7.52 | |
| Independent | Sultan Ahmed Khan khuhawar | 2,328 | 1.81 | |
| Independent | Akhtar Hussain shaikh | 2,269 | 1.77 | |
| Independent | Rabb Nawaz tunio | 1,282 | 1,00 | |
| Independent | Mir Imran Ali | 1,092 | 0.85 | |
| Independent | Nazzer Hussain Magsi | 954 | 0.74 | |
| PPP(SB) | Sarfraz Ahmed | 794 | 0.62 | |
| Independent | Liaqat ali | 476 | 0.37 | |
| Independent | Muzafar Ali Brohi | 440 | 0.34 | |
| Independent | Ayyaz Hussain | 304 | 0.23 | |
| Independent | Saifullah Abro | 106 | 0.08 | |
| Turnout | | 138,633 | 42.73 | |
| Total valid votes | | 127,895 | 92.25 | |
| Rejected ballots | | 10,738 | 7.75 | |
| Majority | | 36,113 | 28.22 | |
| Registered electors | | 324,402 | | |

== Election 2024 ==
General elections were held on 8 February 2024. Bilawal Bhutto Zardari, the chairman of the Pakistan People's Party (PPP) won the election with 85,370 votes, but decided to vacate it in favour of NA-194 Larkana-I.

General election 2024: NA-196 Qambar Shahdadkot-I
| Party | Candidate | Votes | % | ±% |
|---|---|---|---|---|
| PPP | Bilawal Bhutto Zardari | 85,370 | 63.06 | ▲6.76 |
| JUI (F) | Nasir Mehmood | 34,499 | 25.48 | N/A |
| Others | Others (eleven candidates) | 15,510 | 11.46 | |
| Turnout | | 145,735 | 34.89 | ▼7.84 |
| Total valid votes | | 135,379 | 92.89 | |
| Rejected ballots | | 10,356 | 7.11 | |
| Majority | | 50,871 | 37.58 | ▲9.36 |
| PPP hold | | | | |

== By-election 2024 ==
A by-election was held on 21 April 2024. Khursheed Ahmed Junejo won the election with 91,581 votes.

2024 Pakistani by-elections: NA-196 Qambar Shahdadkot-I
| Party | Candidate | Votes | % | ±% |
|---|---|---|---|---|
| PPP | Khursheed Ahmed Junejo | 91,581 | 96.42 | ▲33.36 |
| TLP | Muhammad Ali | 2,763 | 2.91 | ▲0.91 |
| Independent | Javed Ali | 499 | 0.52 | |
| Independent | Buland Junejo | 142 | 0.15 | |
| Turnout | | 96,572 | 22.79 | ▼12.10 |
| Total valid votes | | 94,985 | 98.36 | |
| Rejected ballots | | 1,587 | 1.64 | |
| Majority | | 88,818 | 93.51 | ▲55.93 |
| Registered electors | | 423,781 | | |
| PPP hold | | | | |

== See also ==
- NA-195 Larkana-II
- NA-197 Qambar Shahdadkot-II
