= NA-195 Larkana-II =

Constituency of the National Assembly of Pakistan

- Constituency for the National Assembly of Pakistan
- Region: Dokri Tehsil, Bakrani Tehsil and Larkana Tehsil (partly) of Larkana District
- Electorate: 427,621

Current constituency
- Created: 2018
- Party: Pakistan People's Party
- Member: Nazeer Ahmed Baghio
- Created from: NA-204 (Larkana-I); NA-205 (Larkana-II)

NA-195 Larkana-II (این اے-195، لاڑکانہ-2) is a constituency of the National Assembly of Pakistan. It comprises Dokri Taluka, Bakrani Taluka, and some areas of the Larkana Taluka, which includes a portion of the city of Larkana. It was created in the 2018 delimitation after the constituency overlapping between Qambar Shahdadkot District and Larkana District was ended. The representative as of 2026 was Nazeer Ahmed Baghio.

== Assembly Segments ==
| Constituency number | Constituency | District | Current MPA | Party |
|---|---|---|---|---|
| 12 | PS-12 Larkana-III | Larkana District | Sohail Anwar Siyal | PPP |
| 13 | PS-13 Larkana-IV | Larkana District | Adil Altaf Unnar | PPP |

== Election 2018 ==
General elections were held on 25 July 2018.

General election 2018: NA-201 Larkana-II
| Party | Candidate | Votes | % | ±% |
|---|---|---|---|---|
| PPP | Khursheed Ahmed Junejo | 97,107 | 52.98 | |
| GDA | Allah Bakhsh Unarr | 69,150 | 37.73 | |
| PTI | Quratul Ain | 10,346 | 5.64 | |
| Others | Others (five candidates) | 6,675 | 3.64 | |
| Turnout | | 193,744 | 52.77 | |
| Total valid votes | | 183,278 | 94.60 | |
| Rejected ballots | | 10,466 | 5.40 | |
| Majority | | 27,957 | 15.25 | |
| Registered electors | | 367,116 | | |

== Election 2024 ==
Elections were held on 8 February 2024. Nazeer Ahmed Baghio won the election with 133,830 votes.

General election 2024: NA-195 Larkana-II
| Party | Candidate | Votes | % | ±% |
|---|---|---|---|---|
| PPP | Nazeer Ahmed Baghio | 133,830 | 70.72 | ▲17.74 |
| GDA | Safdar Ali Abbasi | 48,893 | 25.84 | ▼11.89 |
| Others | Others (seven candidates) | 6,512 | 3.44 | |
| Turnout | | 196,358 | 45.92 | ▼6.85 |
| Total valid votes | | 189,235 | 96.37 | |
| Rejected ballots | | 7,123 | 3.63 | |
| Majority | | 84,937 | 44.88 | ▲29.63 |
| Registered electors | | 427,621 | | |
| PPP hold | | | | |

== See also ==
- NA-194 Larkana-I
- NA-196 Qambar Shahdadkot-I
