= Wagan City =

Wagan City وڳڻ شھر
- City
- Waggan
- Location of Waggan City on Indus Highway, Pakistan
- Coordinates: 27°29′40″N 67°57′49″E
- Country: Pakistan
- Province: Sindh
- District: Qambar Shahdadkot District

Government
  - Type: TOWN
  - Body: Union-council 1-PEER-JO-KOT 2-ALI KHABAR 3- JAFRANA 4- BANHO KHAN MUGHERI 5- KHATAN KHAN MUGHERI
  - Chairman: (Chief Sardar Khalil Ahmed Khan Wagan)
- Time zone: UTC+5 (PST)
  - Summer (DST): UTC+6 (PDT)

Wagan City (Sindhi: وڳڻ شھر) is a town of Warah Tehsil in the Qambar Shahdadkot District, Sindh Province, Pakistan, with a population of 70,000.

Waggan is located on the Indus Highway 26 km from Larkana. It has been considered a town since 2019.

== See also ==
- Qambar Shahdadkot District
- Warah Tehsil
- Qambar
- Nasirabad, Sindh
- Larkana
- Indus Highway
