= Constituency NA-205 =

Former constituency of the National Assembly of Pakistan

Constituency NA-205 (Larkana-II)
- Former constituency for the National Assembly of Pakistan
- Region: Larkana District

Former constituency
- Abolished: 2018

Constituency NA-205 (Larkana-II) (Urdu: این اے-۲۰۵، لاڑکانہ-۲) was a constituency for the National Assembly of Pakistan. It was abolished in the 2018 delimitation after the overlap between the constituencies of Larkana District and Qambar Shahdadkot District was undone. Now the two districts have separate constituencies: NA-200 (Larkana-I), NA-201 (Larkana-II), NA-202 (Qambar Shahdadkot-I), and NA-203 (Qambar Shahdadkot-II). And the area of the former NA-205 is divided between NA-201 and NA-203.

== Election 2002 ==
General elections were held on 10 October 2002. Hizbullah Bughio of PPP won by 45,097 votes.

General election 2002: NA-205 (Larkana-II)
Party	Candidate	Votes	%	±%
PPP	Hizbullah Bughio	45,097	49.88	
PML(Q)	Altaf Hussain Unar	44,473	49.19	
Others	Others (seven candidates)	844	0.93	
Turnout		92,633	34.00	
Total valid votes		90,414	97.61	
Rejected ballots		2,219	2.39	
Majority		624	0.69	
Registered electors		272,435		

== Election 2008 ==
General elections were held on 18 February 2008. Nazir Ahmed Bughio of PPP won by 72,928 votes.

General election 2008: NA-205 (Larkana-II)
Party	Candidate	Votes	%	±%
PPP	Nazir Anmed Bughio	72,928	72.10	
PML(Q)	Altaf Hussain Unar	25,847	25.55	
Others	Others (nine candidates)	2,371	2.35	
Turnout		103,889	37.53	
Total valid votes		101,146	97.36	
Rejected ballots		2,743	2.64	
Majority		47,081	46.55	
Registered electors		276,844		

== Election 2013 ==
General elections were held on 11 May 2013. Nazir Ahmed Bughio of PPP won by 65,720 votes and became the member of National Assembly.

General election 2013: NA-205 (Larkana-II)
Party	Candidate	Votes	%	±%
PPP	Nazir Anmed Bughio	65,720	54.64	
Independent	Safdar Ali Abbasi	23,561	19.59	
PML(F)	Sarfaraz Ali Bughio	12,216	10.16	
Independent	Noor Ahmed Brohi	3,684	3.06	
Independent	Aadil Altaf Unar	3,578	2.98	
Independent	Ghulam Shabir Mugheri Baloch	3,268	2.72	
MWM	Moula Bux Murtazai	2,022	1.68	
Others	Others (twelve candidates)	6,222	5.17	
Turnout		129,403	51.21	
Total valid votes		120,271	92.94	
Rejected ballots		9,132	7.06	
Majority		42,159	35.05	
Registered electors		252,714		
