= Constituency NA-206 =

Former constituency of the National Assembly of Pakistan

Constituency NA-206 (Larkana-III)
- Former Yasir Ali DK Punjab Pakistan constituency for the National Assembly of Pakistan
- Region: Larkana District

Former constituency
- Abolished: 2018

Constituency NA-206 (Larkana-III) (Urdu: این اے-۲۰۶، لاڑکانہ-۳) was a constituency for the National Assembly of Pakistan. It was abolished in the 2018 delimitation after the overlap between the constituencies of Larkana District and Qambar Shahdadkot District was undone. Now the two districts have separate constituencies: NA-200 (Larkana-I), NA-201 (Larkana-II), NA-202 (Qambar Shahdadkot-I), and NA-203 (Qambar Shahdadkot-II). And the Qambar area of the former NA-206 is divided between NA-202 and NA-203.

== Election 2002 ==
General elections were held on 10 October 2002. Khalid Iqbal Memon of PPP won by 36,929 votes.

General election 2002: NA-206 (Larkana-III)
| Party | Candidate | Votes | % | ±% |
|---|---|---|---|---|
| PPP | Khalid Iqbal Memon | 36,929 | 53.55 | |
| NA | Syed Asghar Hussain Rashidi | 31,841 | 46.17 | |
| PML(N) | Fida Hussain Magsi | 190 | 0.28 | |
| Turnout | | 71,695 | 28.04 | |
| Total valid votes | | 68,960 | 96.19 | |
| Rejected ballots | | 3,005 | 3.81 | |
| Majority | | 5,088 | 7.38 | |
| Registered electors | | 255,723 | | |

== Election 2008 ==
General elections were held on 18 February 2008. Mir Amir Ali Khan Magsi of PPP won by 49,524 votes.

General election 2008: NA-206 (Larkana-III)
| Party | Candidate | Votes | % | ±% |
|---|---|---|---|---|
| PPP | Mir Aamir Ali Khan Magsi | 49,524 | 65.87 | |
| PML(Q) | Nawabzada Sardar Khan Chandio | 23,545 | 31.32 | |
| Others | Others (eight candidates) | 2,112 | 2.81 | |
| Turnout | | 77,573 | 52.13 | |
| Total valid votes | | 75,181 | 96.92 | |
| Rejected ballots | | 2,392 | 3.08 | |
| Majority | | 25,979 | 33.55 | |
| Registered electors | | 148,797 | | |

== Election 2013 ==
General elections were held on 11 May 2013. Mir Aamir Ali Khan Magsi of PPP won by 87,789 votes and became the member of National Assembly.

General election 2013: NA-206 (Larkana-III)
| Party | Candidate | Votes | % | ±% |
|---|---|---|---|---|
| PPP | Mir Aamir Ali Khan Magsi | 87,789 | 76.02 | |
| SUP | Asgher Shah Rashdi | 22,089 | 19.13 | |
| MDM | Asghar Ali Abbasi | 2,657 | 2.30 | |
| Others | Others (nine candidates) | 2,947 | 2.55 | |
| Turnout | | 122,131 | 47.32 | |
| Total valid votes | | 115,482 | 94.56 | |
| Rejected ballots | | 6,649 | 5.44 | |
| Majority | | 65,700 | 56.89 | |
| Registered electors | | 258,115 | | |
