= Zulfiqar Ali Bhutto Agricultural College =

Z.A. Bhutto Agricultural College Dokri
- Sindhi: زيڊ اي ڀٽو ايگريڪلچرل ڪاليج ڏوڪري
- Type: College
- Established: 1992
- Academic affiliations: SAU and HEC
- Principal: Abdul Ghafoor Magsi
- Faculty: 35
- Administrative staff: 100
- Students: above 200
- Undergraduates: above 200
- Location: Larkana, Sindh, Pakistan; 27°25′57.60″N 68°07′12.84″E
- Campus: Rural
- Colours: Green and blue
- Website: ZABAC

The Zulfikar Ali Bhutto Agriculture College, Dokri, (Sindhi: زيڊ اي ڀٽو ايگريڪلچرل ڪاليج ڏوڪري) is an affiliated college of Sindh Agriculture University, Tandojam. This college is situated in Taluka Bakrani, district Larkana at an elevation of 164 ft. above mean sea level. Knowing the importance of agricultural education for the people of upper Sindh, Shaheed Mohtrama Benazir Bhutto announced the establishment of this college at a public gathering at Rice Research Institute Dokri in 1991. The college started functioning in September 1991, when some abandoned buildings of Rice Research Institute Dokri were renovated and handed over to Sindh Agriculture University.

The college later moved in 1997 to a newly constructed campus near Mihrabpur, Taluka Bakrani. This new college campus is located near Hyder Jatoi Railway Station and Mihrabpur village, 16 km south of Larkana city and 8 km north of Dokri along Larkana-Dokri via Mihrabpur road. The town of Bakrani is located 6 km to the east.

== Departments ==
- Department of Agronomy
- Department of Plant Pathology
- Department of Plant Protection
- Department of Plant Breeding & Genetics
- Department of Economics
- Department of Islamic Studies
- Department of Statistics
- Department of Education Extension
- Department of Agricultural Engineering
- Department of Horticulture
- Department of Soil Science
- Department of Animal Husbandry & Veterinary Sciences
