= Ghogharo =

- Deh
- Location within Pakistan Ghogharo (Pakistan)
- Coordinates: 27.47611°N 68.00567°E
- Country: Pakistan
- Province: Sindh
- Division: Larkana
- District: Qambar Shahdadkot
- Elevation: 174 ft (53 m)
- Time zone: UTC+5 (PST)

Ghogharo is a village and deh in Qambar Tehsil of Qambar Shahdadkot District in Sindh province of Pakistan. It is a predominantly agricultural village, with major crops including rice paddies and wheat fields, and it has a population of about 5000. The people speak Sindhi and Saraiki, and they belong to many different tribes: Mangan, Wagan, Chandio, Bhatti, Khokhar, Babar, Kori, Khaskheli, Pirzada and Meo Rajput are the main ones.

It has historically been known for its rice production, being considered one of the best rice producers in Sindh.
