= Isran =

Isran family
- Current region: Pakistan (Bala Village, Islamabad, Rawalpindi); United Arab Emirates (Dubai, Sharjah)
- Origin: Mianwali District, Punjab, Pakistan
- Connected members: Ghulam Mujtaba Isran, Ghanwer Ali Khan Isran, Isran Noor

Isran is a family name and surname primarily associated with a Sindhi Muslim lineage from Mianwali District, Punjab, Pakistan. The family is mainly concentrated in Bala Village and in the locality known as Isran Wala. Today, many members live in Islamabad and Rawalpindi, while others have migrated overseas to the United Arab Emirates (Dubai and Sharjah).

The Isran family is historically connected to Sindhi Muslim migrants who moved northwards into Punjab during different periods. Oral traditions also suggest ancestral ties to Central Asian groups, reflecting broader Pashtun–Sindhi interactions across the Indus Valley.

== Origins ==
The family traces its roots to Malik Bahadur Isran and his spouse Maryam Isran, considered the ancestral heads of the Bala Village household. The Bala residence, sometimes referred to as the "Isran House", remains the symbolic heart of the family.

== Notable members in Pakistan ==
Malik Nawaz Isran – Shop owner in Mianwali. Spouse: Arshad Children: Laraib Isran, Sufyan Isran, Ayesha Isran, Rizwan Isran

Malik Manzoor Isran – Construction worker (field-based). Spouse: Sobia Children: Adil Isran, Daniyal Isran

Malik Ghazanfar Isran – Government officer (administrative). Spouse: Sabira Sultana Children: Ahmad Malik Isran, Abdullah Malik Isran

Malik Qayum Isran – Owner of Heaven Real Estates. Spouse: Name not public Children: Malik Mubeen Isran, Malik Azmatullah Isran (children: Saim Malik Isran, Saroash Malik Isran), Sumaiya Isran (married to Naemullah Isran, children: Uswa Isran)

Rabnawaz Isran – Brother from Bala branch. Children: Noman Isran, Omar Isran, Waqar Isran, Ahsan Isran, Meena Isran, Sameena Isran

== Wider family ==
Malik Irfan Isran – Son of Sister from Main Branch. Spouse: Safia Isran Children: Rehan Malik Isran, Rehab Malik Isran, Rafiya Malik Isran, Sayed, Amir, plus one other child.

Naemullah Isran – Son of Sister from Main Branch of Bala branch.

Istaqlal Isran – Son of Sister from Main Branch.

== Overseas members ==
The Isran diaspora is significant in the United Arab Emirates:

Haji Muhammad Isran – Prominent businessman, owns a large shop in Sharjah.

Haji Karim Isran – Businessman in Dubai.

== Family tree ==
{{{MALIK BAHADUR ISRAN}}}	{{{MARYAM ISRAN}}}
{{{Nawaz}}}	{{{Manzoor}}}	{{{Ghazanfar}}}	{{{Qayum}}}	{{{Rabnawaz}}}
{{{Laraib • Sufyan • Ayesha • Rizwan}}}	{{{Adil • Daniyal}}}	{{{Ahmad • Abdullah}}}	{{{Mubeen • Azmatullah • Sumaiya}}}	{{{Noman • Omar • Waqar • Ahsan • Meena • Sameena}}}
{{{Azmatullah}}}
{{{Saroash • Saim}}}

== Settlement ==
Although the ancestral home remains in Bala Village, the majority of the family has moved to Islamabad and Rawalpindi, where they live a moderate middle-class to elite lifestyle. The Bala house is still used for gatherings and family reunions.

== Notable people with the surname Isran ==
Isran Noor (born 1959), Indonesian politician

Ghulam Mujtaba Isran (1943–2018), Pakistani politician

Ghanwer Ali Khan Isran, Pakistani politician

Norbaiti Isran Noor (1969–2023), Indonesian politician
