= Constituency NA-207 =

Former constituency of the National Assembly of Pakistan

Constituency NA-207 (Larkana-IV)
- Former constituency for the National Assembly of Pakistan
- District: Larkana District
- Province: Sindh
- Electorate: 282,819

Former constituency
- Created: 1970
- Abolished: 2018
- Member(s): Faryal Talpur

Constituency NA-207 (Larkana-IV) (Urdu: این اے-۲۰۷، لاڑکانہ-۴) was a constituency for the National Assembly of Pakistan. It was abolished in the 2018 delimitation as this constituency's area encompassed three districts: Larkana, Shikarpur, and Qambar Shadadkot. Now the major area of the constituency, which belonged to Larkana, is included in NA-200 (Larkana-I). The Qambar Shahdadkot area is in NA-202 (Qambar Shahdadkot-I) and the area belonging to Shikarpur is in NA-199 (Shikarpur-II).

== Election 2002 ==
General elections were held on 10 October 2002. Shahid Hussain Bhutto of PPP won by 54,349 votes.

General election 2002: NA-207 Larkana-cum-Shikarpur-cum-Kamber Shahdadkot
Party	Candidate	Votes	%	±%
PPP	Shahid Hussain Bhutto	54,349	59.96	
MMA	Dr. Khalid Mahmood Soomro	26,183	28.89	
PPP(SB)	Farooq Ali Khan Bhutto	4,687	5.17	
Independent	Manzoor Ali Lashari	2,188	2.41	
Others	Others (four candidates)	3,234	3.57	
Turnout		95,070	38.00	
Total valid votes		90,641	95.34	
Rejected ballots		4,429	4.66	
Majority		28,166	31.07	
Registered electors		250,200		

== Election 2008 ==
General elections were held on 18 February 2008. Faryal Talpur of PPP won the seat Unopposed

== Election 2013 ==
General elections 2013 were held on 11 May 2013. The constituency is often called "The fort of the PPP" as the seat covers the native home of the former Prime Ministers Benazir Bhutto and Zulfiqar Ali Bhutto, Garhi Khuda Baksh. The seat was won by Ms. Faryal Talpur of the PPP in the 2013 general election who won this seat uncontested in 2008.

General election 2013: NA-207 Larkana-cum-Shikarpur-cum-Kamber Shahdadkot
Party	Candidate	Votes	%	±%
PPP	Faryal Talpur	83,918	57.89	
PPP(SB)	Ghanva Bhutto	28,195	19.45	
JUI (F)	Dr. Khalid Mahmood Soomro	20,480	14.13	
MDM	Manzoor Ahmed Solangi	3,575	2.47	
Others	Others (thirty three candidates)	8,791	6.06	
Turnout		153,403	54.24	
Total valid votes		144,959	94.50	
Rejected ballots		8,444	5.50	
Majority		55,723	38.44	
Registered electors		282,819		
