= NA-197 Qambar Shahdadkot-II =

Constituency of the National Assembly of Pakistan

- Constituency for the National Assembly of Pakistan
- Region: Nasirabad, Warah, Tehsils and Qambar Tehsil (partly) including Qambar city of Qambar Shahdadkot District

Current constituency
- Created: 2018
- Party: Pakistan People's Party
- Member(s): Mir Aamir Ali Khan Magsi
- Created from: NA-205 (Larkana-II); NA-206 (Larkana-III)

NA-197 Qambar Shahdadkot-II (این اے-197، قمبرشہدادکوٹ-2) is a newly created constituency for the National Assembly of Pakistan. It mainly comprises the Nasirabad Taluka, Warah Taluka, and Qambar Ali Khan Taluka. It was created in the 2018 delimitation after the constituency overlapping between Qambar Shahdadkot District and Larkana District was ended.

== Assembly Segments ==
Constituency number	Constituency	District	Current MPA	Party
16	PS-16 Qambar Shahdadkot-III	Qambar Shahdadkot District	Nawab Ghaibi Sardar Khan Chandio	PPP
17	PS-17 Qambar Shahdadkot-IV	Qambar Shahdadkot District	Burhan Chandio	PPP

== Election 2018 ==
General elections were held on 25 July 2018.

General election 2018: NA-203 Qambar Shahdadkot-II
Party	Candidate	Votes	%	±%
PPP	Mir Aamir Ali Khan Magsi	80,060	75.96	
PTI	Sakhawat Ali	13,008	12.34	
GDA	Faiz Muhammad	6,857	6.51	
PPP(SB)	Nawabuddin	2,557	2.43	
AWP	Zulfiqar Ali	1,418	1.35	
Independent	Abdul Manan Chandio	307	0.29	
SUP	Muhib Ali Phulpoto	303	0.29	
Independent	Muhammad Hussam	284	0.27	
Independent	Nawabzada Rehan Chandio	248	0.24	
Independent	Saifullah Abro	195	0.19	
Independent	Ghulam Murtaza Shah	163	0.16	
Turnout		112,803	35.97	
Total valid votes		105,400	93.44	
Rejected ballots		7,403	6.56	
Majority		67,052	63.62	
Registered electors		313,644		

== Election 2024 ==
Elections were held on 8 February 2024. Mir Aamir Ali Khan Magsi won the election with 88,130 votes.

General election 2024: NA-197 Qambar Shahdadkot-II
Party	Candidate	Votes	%	±%
PPP	Mir Aamir Ali Khan Magsi	88,130	70.58	▼5.38
JUI (F)	Muhammad Uzair Jagirani	24,199	19.38	
Others	Others (nine candidates)	12,543	10.04	
Turnout		132,344	32.86	▼3.11
Total valid votes		124,872	94.35	
Rejected ballots		7,472	5.65	
Majority		63,931	51.20	▼12.42
Registered electors		402,718		
PPP hold				

== See also ==
- NA-196 Qambar Shahdadkot-I
- NA-198 Ghotki-I
