= Bhutta Kalhora =

- Village
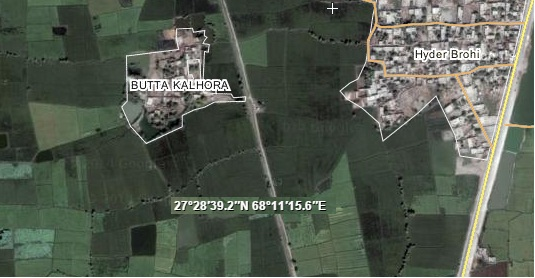
- Satellite View

- Location in Sindh, Pakistan Bhutta Kalhora (Pakistan)
- Coordinates: 27°28′34″N 68°11′4″E
- Country: Pakistan
- Province: Sindh
- District: Larkana District

Area
  - Land: 0.110 sq mi (0.284 km^{2})

Population
  - Total: 150
  - Density: 1,400/sq mi (530/km^{2})
- Time zone: UTC+5 (PST)
- Postal code: 77110

Bhutta Kalhora (Sindhi:ٻٽا ڪلھوڙا) is a village situated in Bakrani Taluka, city Larkana, province Sindh.

The village was created 300 years ago, during Kalhora Dynasty. Due to diseases spread in the village during 1920, inhabitants abandoned it and only few families left behind. it is now home of only 150 inhabitants. It is spread over an area of 20 acres living land.

Wheat and rice production is the source of income of the peoples, along with limited cattle for their own use. Peoples here are Muslims. Rice, fish, wheat, butter and milk are among the peoples diet. The village has only one Primary School created in 1990. Its actual land has now been converted into different villages like Hyder Brohi, Mula Abra and Brohi.
