= Nazeer Ahmed Baghio =

Pakistani politician

Nazeer Ahmed Bughio
- نذير احمد ٻُگھيو

Member of the National Assembly of Pakistan
- Incumbent
- Assumed office 29 February 2024
- Constituency: NA-195 Larkana-II
- In office 2008 – 31 May 2018
- Constituency: NA-205 (Larkana cum-Kamber Shahdadkot)

Personal details
- Born: 8 April 1955 (age 71) Larkana, Sindh, Pakistan
- Party: PPP (2008-present)

Nazeer Ahmed Bughio (Sindhi: نذير احمد ٻُگھيو;Urdu: نظیر احمد بگھیو; born 8 April 1955) is a Pakistani politician who has been a member of the National Assembly of Pakistan since February 2024 and previously served in this position from 2008 to May 2018.

== Early life ==
He was born on 8 April 1955.

== Political career ==
He was elected to the National Assembly of Pakistan as a candidate of Pakistan Peoples Party (PPP) from Constituency NA-205 (Larkana cum-Kamber Shahdadkot) in the 2008 Pakistani general election. He received 72,928 votes and defeated Altaf Hussain Unar.

He was re-elected to the National Assembly as a candidate of PPP from Constituency NA-205 (Larkana cum-Kamber Shahdadkot) in the 2013 Pakistani general election. He received 65,720 votes and defeated an independent candidate, Safdar Ali Abbasi.

He was re-elected to the National Assembly as a candidate of PPP from NA-195 Larkana-II in the 2024 Pakistani general election. He received 133,830 votes and defeated Safdar Ali Abbasi, a candidate of the Grand Democratic Alliance (GDA).
