= NA-194 Larkana-I =

Constituency of the National Assembly of Pakistan

- Constituency for the National Assembly of Pakistan
- Region: Ratodero Tehsil and Larkana Tehsil (partly) including Larkana city of Larkana District
- Electorate: 438,208

Current constituency
- Created: 2018
- Party: Pakistan People's Party
- Member: Bilawal Bhutto Zardari
- Created from: NA-204 (Larkana-I); NA-207 (Larkana-IV)

NA-194 Larkana-I (این اے-194، لاڑکانہ-1) is a National Assembly of Pakistan constituency. It mainly comprises the Ratodero Taluka and some areas of the Larkana Taluka, which includes a portion of the city of Larkana. It was created in the 2018 delimitation after the constituency overlapping between Qambar Shahdadkot District and Larkana District was ended.

== Assembly Segments ==
Constituency number	Constituency	District	Current MPA	Party
10	PS-10 Larkana-I	Larkana District	Faryal Talpur	PPP
11	PS-11 Larkana-II	Larkana District	Jameel Ahmed Soomro	PPP

== Election 2018 ==
General elections were held on 25 July 2018.

General election 2018: NA-200 Larkana-I
Party	Candidate	Votes	%
PPP	Bilawal Bhutto Zardari	84,426	55.40
MMA	Rashid Mahmood Soomro	50,200	32.94
PTI	Halima Bhutto	8,661	5.68
other	other (fifteen candidates)	9,120	5.98
Valid ballots		152,407	93.97
Rejected ballots		9,777	6.03
Turnout		162,184	48.25
Majority		34,226	22.46
PPP win (new seat)			

== Election 2024 ==
Elections were held on 8 February 2024. Bilawal Bhutto Zardari won the election with 136,167 votes.

General election 2024: NA-194 Larkana-I
Party	Candidate	Votes	%	±%
PPP	Bilawal Bhutto Zardari	136,167	74.85	▲19.45
JUI (F)	Rashid Mahmood Soomro	35,526	19.53	
Others	Others (six candidates)	10,231	5.62	
Turnout		188,858	43.10	▼5.15
Total valid votes		181,924	96.33	
Rejected ballots		6,934	3.67	
Majority		100,641	55.32	▲32.86
Registered electors		438,208		
PPP hold				

== See also ==
- NA-193 Shikarpur
- NA-195 Larkana-II
