= Mir Aamir Ali Khan Magsi =

Pakistani politician

- میر عامر علی خان مگسی

Member of the National Assembly of Pakistan
- Incumbent
- Assumed office 29 February 2024
- Constituency: NA-197 Qambar Shahdadkot-II
- In office 13 August 2018 – 10 August 2023
- Constituency: NA-203 (Qambar Shahdadkot-II)
- In office 2008 – 31 May 2018
- Constituency: NA-206 (Kamber Shahdadkot)

Personal details
- Born: December 27, 1960 (age 65)
- Party: PPP (2008-present)
- Relations: Zulfiqar Ali Khan Magsi (Brother) Mir Nadir Ali Khan Magsi (Brother) Nawabzada Tariq Magsi (Brother) Khalid Hussain Magsi (Brother)
- Children: Nawabzada Mir Zarain Magsi

Mir Aamir Ali Khan Magsi (Urdu: میر عامر علی خان مگسی; born 27 December 1960) is a Pakistani politician and three-term member of the National Assembly of Pakistan (August 2018 till August 2023, 2008 to May 2018 and since February 2024).

== Political career ==
He was elected to the National Assembly of Pakistan as a candidate of Pakistan Peoples Party (PPP) from Constituency NA-206 (Kamber Shahdadkot) in the 2008 Pakistani general election. He received 49,524 votes and defeated Nawabzada Sardar Khan Chandio, a candidate of Pakistan Muslim League (Q) (PML-Q).

He was reelected to the National Assembly as a candidate of PPP from Constituency NA-206 (Kamber Shahdadkot) in the 2013 Pakistani general election. He received 87,789 votes and defeated Asgher Shah Rashdi, a candidate of Sindh United Party. In the same election, he ran for the seat of the Provincial Assembly of Sindh as an independent candidate from Constituency PS-40 (Larkana-VI) but was unsuccessful. He received 132 votes and lost the seat to Mir Nadir Ali Khan Magsi.

He was reelected to the National Assembly as a candidate of PPP from NA-203 (Qambar Shahdadkot-II) in the 2018 Pakistani general election.

He was reelected to the National Assembly as a candidate of PPP from NA-197 Qambar Shahdadkot-II in the 2024 Pakistani general election. He received 88,130 votes and defeated Muhammad Uzair Jagirani, a candidate of the Jamiat Ulema-e-Islam (F) (JUI(F)).
