= Warah Tehsil =

Adminstrativ area in Sindh, Pakistan

Warah Tehsil وارہ تعلقہ وارھ تعلتو Wara
- Tehsil of Qambar Shahdadkot District
- Interactive map of Warah Tehsil
- Country: Pakistan
- Province: Sindh
- Division: Larkana Division
- District: Qambar Shahdadkot District

Population (2023)
  - Total: 253,681
- Time zone: UTC+5 (PST)

Warah Tehsil (or Wara) is a tehsil of Qambar Shahdadkot District in Sindh, Pakistan. According to the 2023 national census, it had a population of 253,681.

== History ==
Warah had a Soomra town named "Junani" during the mid 1350's. It was visited by the famous Moroccan traveler Ibn Battuta in 1333 AD. Inspection Bungalow and ruins of the same name still exist there today.

Warah Tehsil was formerly administered as part of Larkana District. It was placed under Qambar Shahdadkot District when the latter was created on 13 December 2004, following the Sindh government's decision to separate Qambar and Shahdadkot talukas from Larkana District to form a new administrative unit.

== Geography ==
Qambar Shahdadkot District, of which Warah forms part, lies in upper Sindh and borders Balochistan's Khuzdar, Jaffarabad, and Jhal Magsi districts to the west, Dadu District to the south, Larkana District to the east, and Jacobabad District to the north. The district's western portion lies along the Kirthar Range, a limestone mountain range extending some 300 kilometres from east-central Balochistan south-west toward the Arabian Sea coast near Karachi. The district contains several freshwater wetlands, including Hamal Lake and Drigh Lake, the latter designated as a Ramsar site since 1976, though it has not been confirmed which of these fall specifically within Warah Tehsil's boundaries rather than elsewhere in the district.

Part of the tehsil is served by the Warah branch canal, which historically drew its supply from the North-Western (Khirthar) Canal before being reconnected to the Rice Canal, a seasonal canal off-taking from the Sukkur Barrage that irrigates land across Larkana, Dadu, and Qambar Shahdadkot districts during the Kharif season.

== Climate ==
Warah Tehsil experiences a hot desert climate (Köppen climate classification BWh), consistent with the wider Qambar Shahdadkot District, where average annual temperatures are around 32 °C, roughly 11 per cent above Pakistan's national average, with summer temperatures frequently exceeding 45 °C. Rainfall is low and highly seasonal, falling mainly during the June–September monsoon.

== Demographics ==
Warah Tehsil's population, per the 2023 census, was overwhelmingly rural, consistent with the pattern across Qambar Shahdadkot District, where about 72 per cent of residents live in rural areas. A district-wide 1998 census figure recorded a male-to-female ratio of approximately 51.5:48.5, and an average household size of about 5.7 to 5.8 members. Sindhi is the predominant language spoken across the district, at over 95 per cent of the population, according to the same profile. The majority of the district's population is Muslim, with a small Hindu minority.

== Economy ==
The tehsil's economy is predominantly agricultural, relying on canal irrigation from the Sukkur Barrage system, with rice as a major crop grown under the seasonal Rice Canal and Warah branch system. Across the wider district, approximately 95 per cent of the population depends on agriculture for their livelihood.

During the 2022 Pakistan floods, Warah was among the talukas of Qambar Shahdadkot District where floodwater levels were reported to be gradually receding in the weeks following the peak of the disaster, according to a United Nations situation report cited by Dawn. The wider district subsequently received support under the World Bank-backed Sindh Flood Emergency Rehabilitation Project, which funded the repair of breached bunds, canals, and drains, and restored livelihoods for low-income residents across Dadu, Jamshoro, and Qambar Shahdadkot districts.

== Infrastructure ==
Education, health, and other public-service infrastructure in Qambar Shahdadkot District as a whole has historically lagged behind provincial averages; a 2010–11 Sindh Education Management Information System survey recorded 1,680 schools district-wide, of which 150 were closed, with a pupil-to-teacher ratio of 46:1. I could not find infrastructure data (roads, electricity, water supply) specific to Warah Tehsil from a reliable source, and have not included any to avoid extrapolating district-wide figures onto the tehsil without support.
