= Farid Abad =

Faridabad
- Village
- فريد آباد
- Location within Pakistan
- Coordinates: 27°27′28.50″N 68°13′46.55″E
- Country: Pakistan
- District: Larkana
- Taluka: Bakrani
- Union Council: Farid Abad
- Deh: Fareed Abad

Area
  - Total: 0.6 km^{2} (0.23 sq mi)
- Highest elevation: 54 m (177 ft)

Population
  - Total: ~5,000
- Time zone: UTC+5 (PST)

Farid Abad (Sindhi: فريد آباد) is a village in Taluka Bakrani, Larkana, Sindh, Pakistan. It is situated at distance of 12 km in south-east of Larkana city and 3 km in east of Bakrani town on the left bank of Dadu Canal. The current MPA of Bakrani Taluka Mr. Ghulam Sarwar Khan Siyal belongs to this village.

Fareed Abad village was founded by leader of the Halti family Mian Fareed (Faqeer) Halti. Later on Siyal tribe in the leadership of Mr. Mohammad Paryal Khan Siyal his elders Migrated from Punjab to Sindh in early 15th century Since then Siyal tribe has authority in all the matters relating to the population of this village and its suburbs. There is large population consisting of Siyal, Bhutto, Halti, Jokhio, Kalhoro, Khichi, Kori, Kumbhar, Mangi, Memon, Buriro Mirani, Rajput (Meo), Shaikh and Syed castes. It comprises more than 800 houses and its population is more than 5000 souls.
