= PS-14 Qambar Shahdadkot-I =

Constituency of the Provincial Assembly of Sindh, Pakistan

- Constituency for the Provincial Assembly of Sindh
- Region: Qubo Saeed Khan Tehsil, Sijawal Junejo Tehsil (partly) and Shahdadkot Tehsil of Qambar Shahdadkot District
- Electorate: 211,737

Current constituency
- Member: Vacant
- Created from: PS-38 Larkana-IV

PS-14 Qambar Shahdadkot-I (پی ایس-14، قمبر-شہدادکوٹ-1) is a constituency of the Provincial Assembly of Sindh.

== General elections 2024 ==
Provincial election 2024: PS-14 Qambar Shahdadkot-I
Party	Candidate	Votes	%	±%
PPP	Mir Nadir Ali Khan Magsi	38,473	58.27	
GDA	Mir Muzafar Ali Brohi	20,422	30.93	
PTI	Naheed (Note: Filed nomination papers as PTI candidate but ECP allowed him to run as an Independent)	2,840	4.30	
PRHP	Ghulam Hussain	1,125	1.70	
Others	Others (six candidates)	3,164	4.80	
Turnout		71,108	33.58	
Total valid votes		66,024	92.85	
Rejected ballots		5,084	7.15	
Majority		18,051	27.34	
Registered electors		211,737		

== General elections 2018 ==
Contesting candidates	Party affiliation	Votes polled

== General elections 2013 ==
Contesting candidates	Party affiliation	Votes polled

== General elections 2008 ==
Contesting candidates	Party affiliation	Votes polled

== See also ==
- PS-13 Larkana-IV
- PS-15 Qambar Shahdadkot-II
