= PS-12 Larkana-III =

Constituency of the Provincial Assembly of Sindh, Pakistan

- Constituency for the Provincial Assembly of Sindh
- Region: Larkana Tehsil (partly) and Bakrani Tehsil (partly) of Larkana District
- Electorate: 202,707

Current constituency
- Member: Vacant
- Created from: PS-35 Larkana-I

PS-12 Larkana-III (پی ایس-12، لاڑکانہ-3) is a constituency of the Provincial Assembly of Sindh.

== General elections 2024 ==
Provincial election 2024: PS-12 Larkana-III
Party	Candidate	Votes	%	±%
PPP	Sohail Anwar Siyal	54,077	59.78	
GDA	Moazzam Ali Khan	31,850	35.21	
TLP	Abdul Razaque	1,517	1.68	
Independent	Rafay Ali Abbasi	1,011	1.12	
Others	Others (nine candidates)	2,000	2.21	
Turnout		95,191	46.96	
Total valid votes		90,455	95.03	
Rejected ballots		4,736	4.97	
Majority		22,227	24.57	
Registered electors		202,707		

== General elections 2018 ==
Contesting candidates	Party affiliation	Votes polled

== General elections 2013 ==
Contesting candidates	Party affiliation	Votes polled

== General elections 2008 ==
Contesting candidates	Party affiliation	Votes polled

== See also ==
- PS-11 Larkana-II
- PS-13 Larkana-IV
