= Drigh Lake =

Lake in Sindh, Pakistan

Coordinates: 27.568°N 67.930°E

Designations

Ramsar Wetland
- Designated: 23 July 1976
- Reference no.: 100

Drigh Lake (Urdu: ڈرگ جھیل) is a Ramsar wetland site situated in Qambar Shahdadkot District in Sindh, Pakistan. The lake lies approximately 29 kilometres (18 mi) from Larkana city and 7 kilometres (4 mi) from Qambar town. The area was declared a wildlife sanctuary in 1972 and was designated as an important wetland site under the Ramsar convention in 1976.

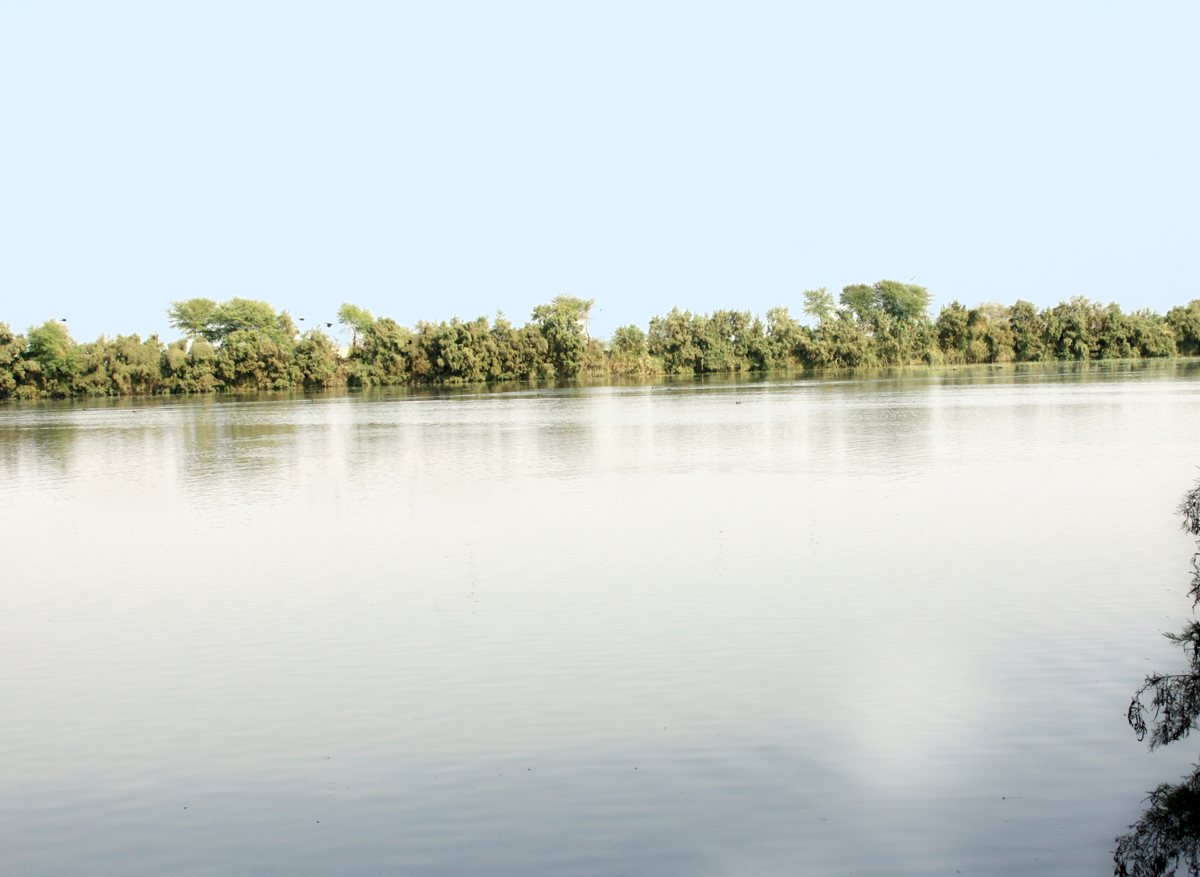
Drigh Lake

The lake has a surface area of 164 hectares (410 acres) and the running length of the lake from north to south is about 4 miles.

== Avifauna ==
Drigh Lake is a favorable area for resident and winter migratory birds like night heron, grey heron, purple heron, great white egret, little egret, mallard, gadwall, pintail, shoveller, common teal, tufted duck, wigeon, osprey, marsh harrier, white breasted kingfisher, pied kingfisher, small blue kingfisher, purple gallinule, white-breasted waterhen, moorhen, cormorant, common pochard, pied harrier, crow pheasant, darter, garganey, ferruginous duck, greater spotted eagle, marbled teal and coot.
