= Wagan (disambiguation) =

Wagan is a village in east-central Poland.

Wagan may also refer to:

- Wagan Land, a 1989 platform video game for the Famicom
- Wagan Paradise, a 1994 platforming game for the Super Famicom
- Wagan City, a city in Sindh, Pakistan
- Wagang (or Wagan), a village in Morobe Province, Papua New Guinea

== See also ==
- Samuel Wagan Watson (born 1972), a contemporary Indigenous Australian poet
