= Mehboob Tunio =

Village Mahboob Tunio ڳوٺ محبوب تونيو
- Village
- Nickname: Tuniyan Jo Goth
- Location Village Mahboob Tunio (Pakistan)
- Coordinates: 27°43′45″N 67°59′30″E
- country: Pakistan
- Province: Sindh
- District: Qamber-Shahdadkot
- Established: Mughal Dynasty Rule
- Local Languages: Sindhi

Mehboob Tunio is an old village situated in Deh Dhori Pir Bux, Nau Tharo Union Council of Taluka Miro Khan district Kamber in Sindh, Pakistan. This village was founded during Mughal rule by people of Tunio caste migrated from Nari, Qalat State.
