= Moazzam Ali Khan =

Pakistani politician

Moazzam Ali Khan Abassi

Member of the Provincial Assembly of Sindh
- In office 29 October 2019 – 11 August 2023
- Constituency: PS-11 Larkana-II
- In office 13 August 2018 – 29 August 2019
- Constituency: PS-11 Larkana-II

Personal details
- Party: GDA (2017-present)

Sardar Moazzam Ali Khan Abbasi is a Pakistani politician who had been a member of the Provincial Assembly of Sindh from October 2019 till August 2023. He previously served as a member from August 2018 to August 2019.

== Education ==
Khan studied at Aitchison College in Lahore.

== Political career ==
He was elected to the Provincial Assembly of Sindh as a candidate of Grand Democratic Alliance from PS-11 (Larkana-II) in the 2018 Sindh provincial election. On 22 August 2019, the Supreme Court of Pakistan disqualified him for failing to declare his assets following a petition filed by Pakistan Peoples Party’s Nida Khuhro.

On 17 October 2019, in a by-election for PS-11 (Larkana-II), Abbasi was re-elected bagging 31,557 votes, while his rival PPP's Jameel Ahmed Soomro secured 26,021 votes.
