= Aziz Ahmed Jatoi =

Pakistani Politician

Member of the Provincial Assembly of Sindh
- In office 2002 – 28 May 2018
- Constituency: PS-41 (Larkana-VII)

Personal details
- Born: 1 November 1964 Mehrabpur Jatoi
- Died: 29 May 2024 (aged 59) Mehrabpur Jatoi
- Party: Pakistan Peoples Party

Aziz Ahmed Jatoi was a Pakistani Politician who had been a Member of Provincial Assembly of Sindh from 2002 to May 2018.

== Early life and education ==
He was born on 1 November 1964 in Mehrabpur Jatoi.

He has a degree of Master of Arts in Political Science and a degree of Bachelor of Arts (Hons) from the University of Karachi.

== Political career ==
He was elected to the Provincial Assembly of Sindh as a candidate of Pakistan Peoples Party (PPP) from Constituency PS-41 (Larkana-VII) in the 2002 Pakistani general election. He received 21,852 votes and defeated Allah Bux Khan, a candidate of Pakistan Muslim League (Q) (PML-Q). In the same election, he ran for the seat of the Provincial Assembly of Sindh as an independent candidate from Constituency PS-42 (Larkana-VII) but was unsuccessful. He received 24 votes and lost the seat to Najamuddin Abro, a candidate of PPP.

He was re-elected to the Provincial Assembly of Sindh as a candidate of PPP from Constituency PS-41 (Larkana-Cum-Kamber Shahdadkot-II) in the 2008 Pakistani general election. He received 37,661 votes and defeated Abdul Ghaffar Brohi, a candidate of PML-Q.

He was re-elected to the Provincial Assembly of Sindh as a candidate of PPP from Constituency PS-41 (Larkana-Cum-Kamber Shahdadkot-II) in the 2013 Pakistani general election. He received 19,663 votes and defeated an independent candidate, Aadil Altaf Unar.
