= Abdul Haq Jamali =

Pakistani politician

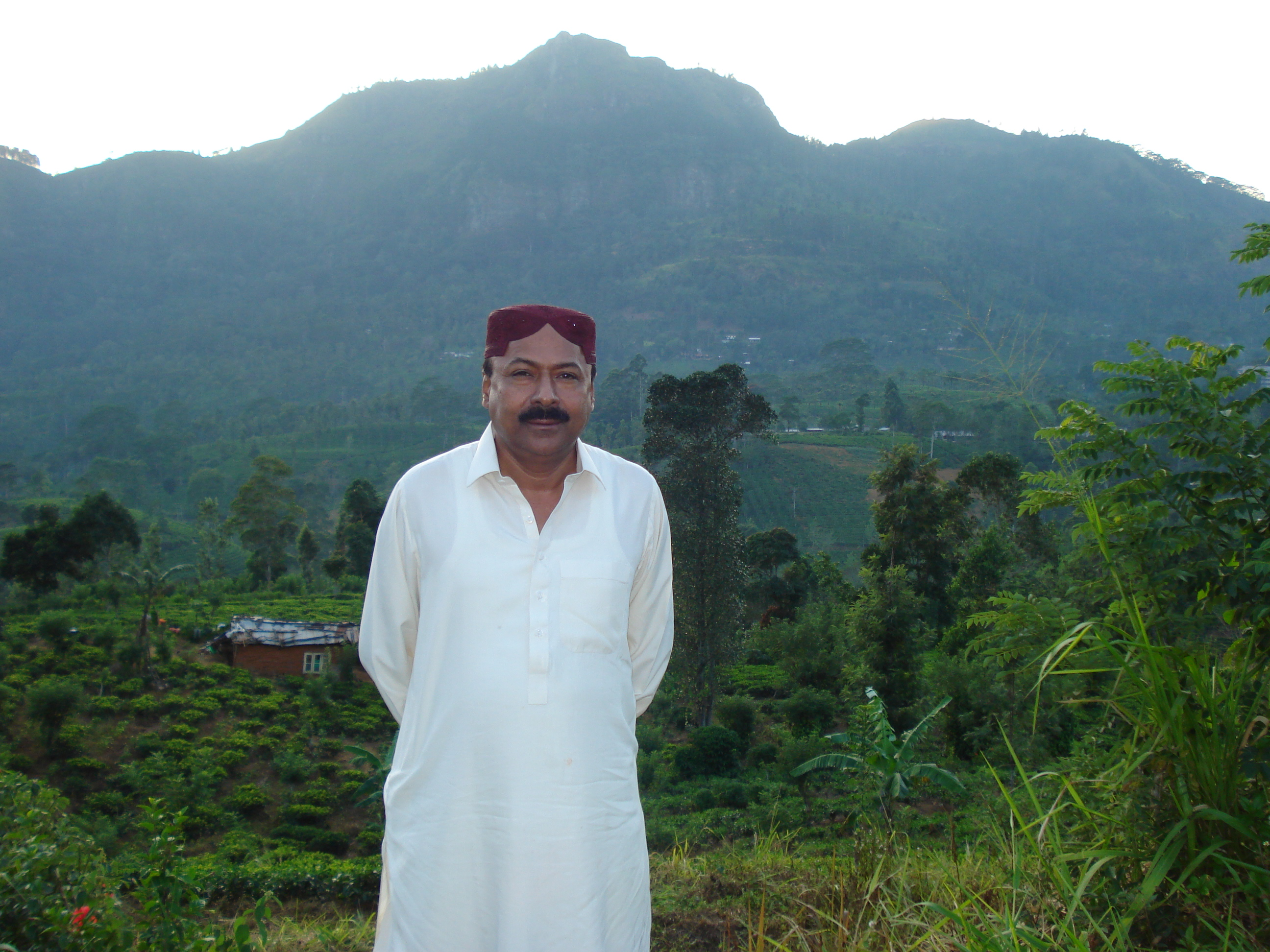

Abdul Haq Jamali is a politician from District Nawabshah (Shaheed Benazir Abad), Sindh. He was elected as Naib Nazim of Nawabshah. After Faryal Talpur resigned as District Nazim, he served as the care taker District Nazim. He holds vice president office of Pakistan Peoples Party Nawabshah.
