= Sijawal Junejo Tehsil =

Pakistani administrative area

Sijawal Junejo Tehsil تعلقہ سجاول جونیجو سجاول جوڻيجو تعلقو
- Taluka (Tehsil)
- Interactive map of Sijawal Junejo Tehsil
- Coordinates: 27°50′30″N 68°06′50″E
- Country: Pakistan
- Region: Sindh
- District: Qambar Shahdadkot District
- Taluka: Sijawal Junejo
- Union councils: 6
- Taluka Created: 1876/2004

Government
  - Type: Local Government
  - Taluka Nazim (2005-2009): Mir Manzoor Ahmed Magsi
  - Assistant Commissioner (A.C): Administrator

Population
  - Total: 117,459
- Time zone: UTC+5 (PST)
- Area code: 074

Sijawal Junejo (Sindhi: سجاول جونیجو) is a taluka of Qambar Shahdadkot District, division Larkana, Province of Sindh, Pakistan. It was established in 2004 when district Qambar Shahdadkot District was newly established. Sijawal Old Name was Sujawal Taluka. At the time of British Government Sujawal was taluka of District Shikarpur from approximately 1876 City was created by Hindus, After the partition the Hindus migrated to India, and then other castes, including Arian, Junejo & Magsi etc, started to arrive. Sijawal name was changed to Sijawal Junejo in year 2000 name was suggested by UC Nazim of that time.

Sijawal Junejo is situated on main Motorway Ratodero- Gwadar Road. It is situated in the center of Ratodero Taluka and shahdadkot. Sijawal Junejo City is 19 km away from Shahdadkot City and 18 km away from Ratodero City. The city is connected by road directly Shahdadkot Ratodero, Mirokhan, Qamber and Larkana District Cities.

Many people from different caste backgrounds live in the city including Magsi, Bhatti, Buriro Jamali, Gadhi, Syed, Brohi, Lohar, Isran, Junejo and Memon and Lashari. There are many villages in its surroundings, such as Soharo Bhatti, Sir Shahnawaz Bhutto, Village Muhammad Ali Junejo, Tharri.

Sijawal Junejo taluka has six Union Councils:

- UC: Sijawal
- UC: Arzi Bhutto
- UC: Dingano Mahesar
- UC: Hyder Chandio.
- UC: Mastoi
- UC: Thoof Chousool

== History ==
The taluka was upgraded from UC to taluka in December 2004 and Split From Mirokhan taluka before upgradation Sijawal was UC of Mirokhan taluka. According to census 2017 total population of talka is 117,459.

== Political history General Election ==
Sijawal Junejo is home town of Pakistan Peoples Party. Former Prime Minister of Pakistan Zulfiqar Ali Bhutto and Benazir Bhutto were elected from Sijawal NA.207.

From Sijawal 1 M.N.A and 2 M.P.A's are elected:

Elected candidate (2002-2007)

NA 207: Shahid Hussain Bhutto (PPPP)

PS 38: Haji Munawar Ali Abbasi (PPPP)

PS 40: Sultan Ahmed Khuhawar (Independent)

Elected candidate (2008-2013)

NA 207: Madam Faryal Talpur (PPPP)

PS 38: Haji Munawar Ali Abbasi (PPPP)

PS 40: Mir Nadir Ali Khan Magsi (PPPP)

Elected candidate (2013-2018)

Na 207: Madam Faryal Talpur (PPPP)

PS 38: Khurshed Ahmed Junejo (PPPP)

PS 40: Mir Nadir Ali Khan Magsi (PPPP)

Elected candidate (2018-2023)

NA 202: Aftab Shahban Mirani (PPPP)

PS 14: Mir Nadir Ali Khan Magsi (PPPP)

PS 15: Ghanwer Ali Khan Isran (PPPP)

Elected Candidate (2024-till)

NA 196: Khursheed Ahmed Junejo (PPPP)

PS 14: Mir Nadir Ali Khan Magsi (PPPP)

PS 15: Nisar Ahmed Khuhro (PPPP)

== Political History Local Government ==
UC Nazim (2000-2004): Mir Manzoor Ahmed Magsi (PPPP)

Taluka Nazim(2005-2009): Mir Manzoor Ahmed Magsi (PPPP)

UC Nazim (2005-2009): Syed Deedar Ali Shah (PML-Q)

UC Chairman (2015-2020): Raja Khan Bhatti (PPPP)

District Council Member (2015-2020): Mir Manzoor Ahmed Magsi (PPPP)

UC Chairman (2023-till): Manzoor Khan Brohi (PPPP)

District Council Member (2023-till): Mir Manzoor Ahmed Magsi (PPPP)

== Geography ==
Sijawal Junejo shares its borders with talukas Ratodero, Mirokhan, Shahdadkot, Gari Khero. Sijawal Junejo is situated at Latitude 27'50'30 (2750'30"N) and Longitude 68,06'50 (686'50.000"E). It is situated in North-western Sindh. Sijawal Weather is hot in Summer.

== Education ==
Sijawal Junejo city has Government and private schools. In Sijawal Junejo city education is limited till high schools, and does not have any college. The students of the village had to travel to nearby cities of Rato dero, Shahdadkot or other surrounding cites in order to further continue their education.

== Health ==
Government Health Center is not available at Sijawal City. Taluka Hospital is in under construction.

== Economy ==
Sijawal Junejo is surrounded by a fertile land, where mainly rice and wheat, including Watermelon, Potatoes, etc. are also cultivated.

== Demographics ==
The majority of the population of both the town and & the taluka of Sijawal Junejo speak the native Sindhi language. Urdu and English are also widely spoken and understood.

== Transport ==
Sijawal Junejo is connected via vans run most towns in the surroundings, including Larkana, Shahdadkot, Ratodero, Mirokhan and Qambar. Passenger buses run between Sijawal Junejo and Karachi, Hyderabad, Sukkur.

== See also ==
- Larkana District
- Qambar Shahdadkot District
- Ratodero Taluka
- Mirokhan
- Shahdadkot
- Zulfiqar Ali Bhutto
- Benazir Bhutto
- Mir Nadir Ali Khan Magsi
- Madam Faryal Talpur
- Khurshed Ahmed Junejo
- Ghanwer Ali Khan Isran
- Aftab Shahban Mirani
