= Ghulam Mujtaba Isran =

Pakistani politician

Member of the Provincial Assembly of Sindh
- In office 29 May 2013 – 28 May 2018

Personal details
- Born: 11 December 1943 (age 82) Khairpur Joso, Larkana District
- Party: Pakistan Peoples Party

Ghulam Mujtaba Isran is a Pakistani politician who had been a Member of the Provincial Assembly of Sindh, from May 2013 to May 2018.

== Early life ==
He was born on 11 December 1943 in Khairpur Joso, Larkana District.

== Political career ==
He was elected to the Provincial Assembly of Sindh as a candidate of Pakistan Peoples Party from Constituency PS-39 KAMBAR SHAHDADKOT-I in the 2013 Pakistani general election.
