= Monder Lakha =

Monder Lakha is a small village in Tehsil/Taluka Nasirabad in District Qambar-Shahdadkot, Sindh, Pakistan. Monder Lakha is a Union Council of District Qambar-Shahdadkot.

Location: Monder Lakha is located on Nasirabad-Warah road and is connected to the country through Indus Highway (6 km away).

People

Monder Lakha has a population of approximately 10,000 people. Major tribe is Lakha/Lakho, after whom it has been named. Lashari, Syed, Khuharo, Wako, Brohi, Shabrani Wahocho, Joyo, Malano, Shaikh Markhand, Phulpoto are other tribes.

Public Buildings Monder Lakha presently has Higher Secondary School, Primary School for boys & girls, Union Council Office.

Major Occupation.

Majority of People are associated with agriculture especially paddy-cultivation. Some are working in government sector as doctors, engineers, teachers and civil servants.
