= Sharifani =

Pakistani village

Sharifani شريفاڻي (Sindhi)
- Village
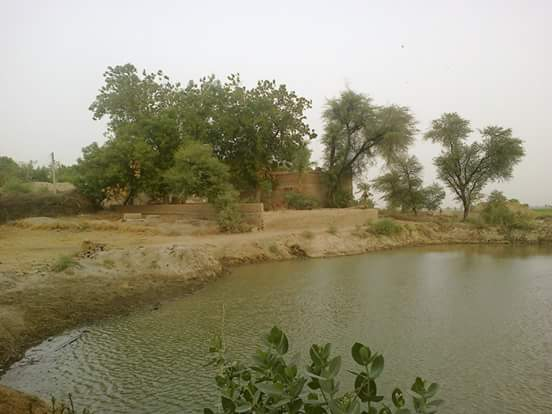
- Sharifani Village

- Location within Pakistan
- Coordinates: 27°32′0.82″N 68°00′36.09″E
- Country: Pakistan
- Province: Sindh
- Time zone: UTC+5 (PST)

Sharifani (Sindhi: شريفاڻي), also known as Upper Sharifani (Sindhi: مٿيان شريفاڻي), is a village located in northwestern Sindh, in the Qambar Shahdadkot District. It lies approximately 7 km (4.3 mi) from Kamber and 24 km (15 mi) from Larkana. Originally named Mehrabpur and primarily inhabited by Hindus, it was later renamed Sharifani for unknown reasons.

Agriculture has traditionally been the main occupation of the villagers. However, as the population grows, many residents have transitioned to business, government, and private sector jobs. A significant number have also migrated to other countries like the UAE and Saudi Arabia, for employment. Farming skills are passed down to children at a young age, reflecting the village's agricultural roots.

The village has a patriarchal social structure. Notably, around 98% of Sharifani's population is literate, highlighting the community's emphasis on education.
