= Goth Pathan =

Goth Pathan ڳوٺ پٺاڻ
- Village
- Location within Pakistan
- Coordinates: 27°26′35.22″N 68°09′22.68″E
- Country: Pakistan
- District: Larkana
- Taluka: Bakrani
- Union Council: Pathan
- Deh: Shaikh Fojo

Area
  - Total: 0.3 km^{2} (0.12 sq mi)
- Highest elevation: 53 m (175 ft)

Population
  - Total: ~10,000
- Time zone: UTC+5 (PST)

Goth Pathan (Sindhi: ڳوٺ پٺاڻ ) is a historical village situated in Taluka Bakrani, District Larkana, Sindh, Pakistan. It is located at an elevation of about 175 feet above mean sea level (MSL), in the south of Larkana city and on the right bank of Dadu Canal. The distance between Larkana city and the village is 13 km. Bakrani town is 4 km away from the village in the East. Bakrani Railway Station is located 3 km in the North-West of the village. The population of Goth Pathan is about 10,000. The village is also a union council comprising nearly 30 small villages.

There are girls and boys primary and high schools located at the north corner of the village. Primary school in this village was built in 1901, where Kamrade Hyder Bux Jatoi received his primary education. This village has all basic facilities including electricity, gas, water supply and telephone. The village is linked by road with Bakrani town on east and Bakrani Railway Station on North-West. There is also a Basic Health Unit to provide medical facilities not only to the people of village but also neighbouring villages. There is a branch post office, agricultural field office, Veterinary Clinic and a union council office in the village.

The village is known for rice and wheat production and also for growing various kinds of vegetables such as cauliflower, turnip, brinjal, spinach, okra, onion etc.

There are fish ponds in the outskirts of the village for the fish production. Also a rice mill and an ice factory is located in east of the village along the Bakrani-Pathan Road.
