= Adil Altaf Unnar =

Member of the Provincial Assembly of Sindh from Larkana (2024–2029)

- عادل الطاف انڙ

Member of the Provincial Assembly of Sindh
- Incumbent
- Assumed office 25 February 2024
- Constituency: PS-13 Larkana-IV

Personal details
- Party: PPP (2024-present)
- Parent: Altaf Hussain Unar (father)

Sardar Adil Altaf Hussain Khan Unar (Sindhi: سردار عادل الطاف حسين خان اُنڙ; Urdu: سردار عادل الطاف حسین خان اُنڑ) is a Pakistani politician who is member of the Provincial Assembly of Sindh.

== Political career ==
Unnar won the 2024 Sindh provincial election from PS-13 Larkana-IV as a Pakistan People’s Party candidate. He received 89,662 votes while runner up Naseer Muhammad of Jamiat Ulema-e-Islam (F) received 4,028 votes.
