= Nasirabad, Sindh =

Tehsil in Sindh, Pakistan

Coordinates: 27°22′52″N 67°55′04″E

Nasirabad Tehsil نصیر آباد تعلقہ نصيرآباد تعلقو
- Taluka (Tehsil)
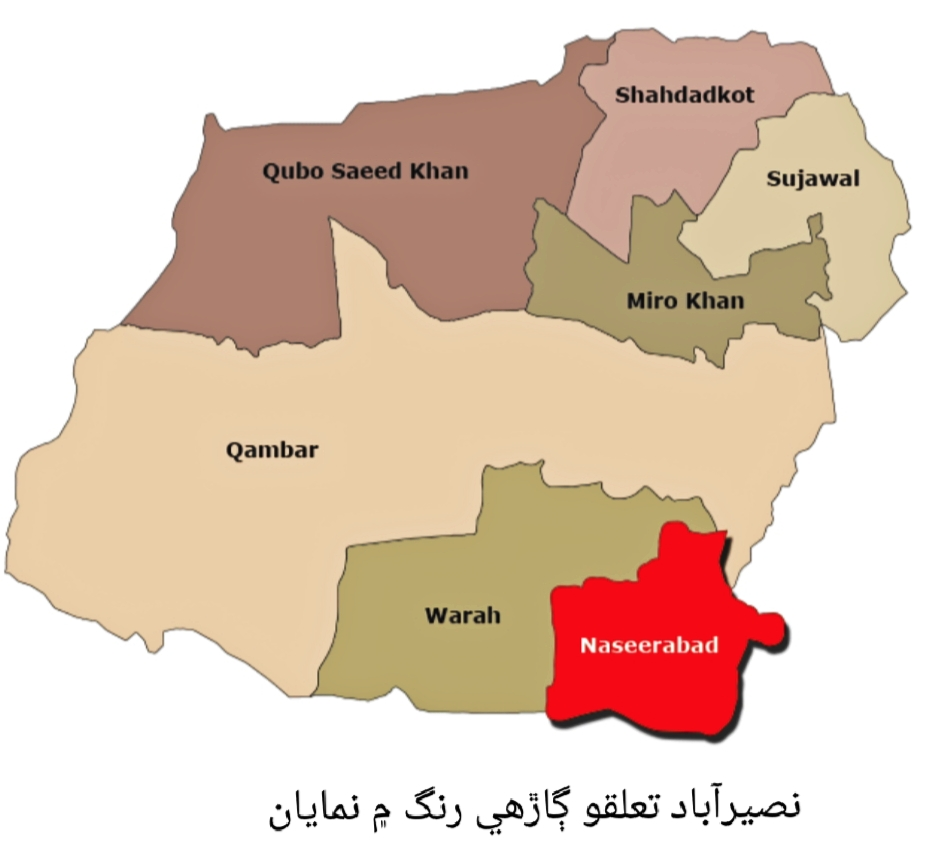
- Nasirabad Tehsil Map
- Country: Pakistan
- Province: Sindh
- Division: Larkana Division
- District: Qambar Shahdadkot District

Nasirabad Tehsil or Naseerabad Tehsil is a town and tehsil of the Qambar Shahdadkot District in Sindh, Pakistan.

== Demographics ==
=== Population ===
The population of Tehsil Nasirabad in the 2023 census is 174,708.
