= PS-15 Qambar Shahdadkot-II =

Constituency of the Provincial Assembly of Sindh, Pakistan

- Constituency for the Provincial Assembly of Sindh
- Region: Qambar Tehsil (partly), Miro Khan Tehsil, and Sijawal Junejo Tehsil (partly) of Qambar Shahdadkot District
- Electorate: 206,003

Current constituency
- Member: Vacant
- Created from: PS-39 Larkana-V

PS-15 Qambar Shahdadkot-II (پی ایس-15، قمبر-شہدادکوٹ-2) is a constituency of the Provincial Assembly of Sindh.

== General elections 2024 ==
Provincial election 2024: PS-15 Qambar Shahdadkot-II
Party	Candidate	Votes	%	±%
PPP	Nisar Khuhro	44,810	64.77	
PML(N)	Humayun Khan	17,211	24.88	
PRHP	Muhammad Ishaque	2,351	3.40	
TLP	Moomal	1,669	2.41	
Others	Others (thirteen candidates)	3,146	4.54	
Turnout		73,762	35.81	
Total valid votes		69,187	93.80	
Rejected ballots		4,575	6.20	
Majority		27,599	39.89	
Registered electors		206,003		

== General elections 2018 ==
Contesting candidates	Party affiliation	Votes polled

== General elections 2013 ==
Contesting candidates	Party affiliation	Votes polled

== General elections 2008 ==
Contesting candidates	Party affiliation	Votes polled

== See also ==
- PS-14 Qambar Shahdadkot-I
- PS-16 Qambar Shahdadkot-III
