= Cholistan Desert Jeep Rally =

Off-road rally raid in Bahawalpur, Pakistan

- Category: Rally raid
- Country: Pakistan
- Inaugural season: 2005
- Classes: PREPARED (A, B, C & D); STOCK (A, B, C & D); WOMEN (PRO and STOCK)
- Drivers: 100 (approx.)
- Official website: www.tdcp.gop.pk

Cholistan Desert Jeep Rally (or simply "Cholistan Jeep Rally" or also known as "TDCP Cholistan Jeep Rally") (رالی جیپ صحرای چولستان) is a rally raid type of off-road race, organised by the TDCP in Pakistan. The event is annually run in the Cholistan Desert venue. It was first introduced in 2005 by Tourism Development Corporation of Punjab (TDCP). The event is run by the Government of Punjab. The rally initiates near the Derawar Fort in Ahmadpur East Tehsil. Around 100 drivers and teams from all over Pakistan participate and almost 100,000 visitors witness it every year.

== Overview ==
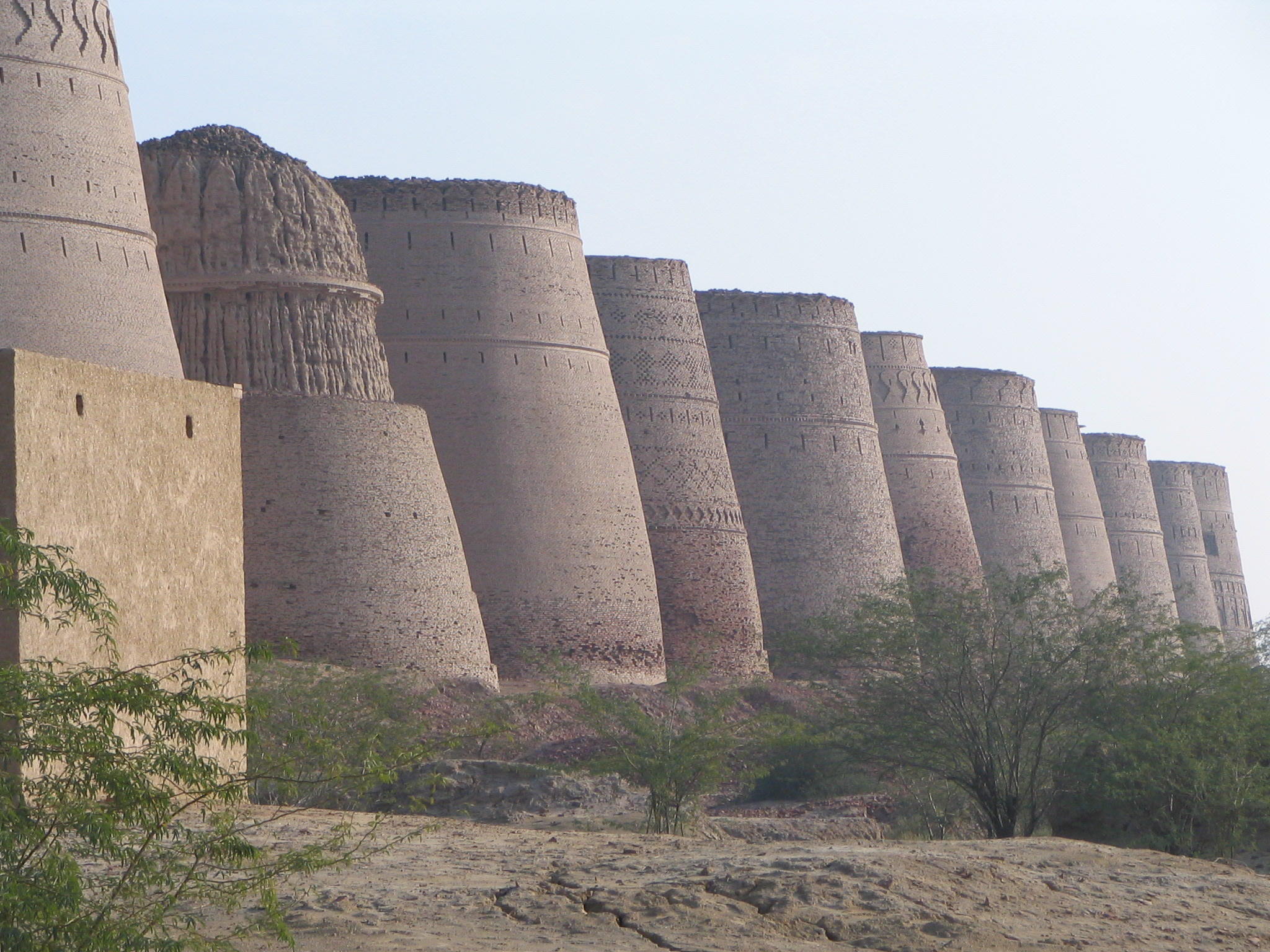
Derawar Fort, Cholistan Desert

The purpose of holding this event in the heart of Cholistan desert is to show the outside world its history and rich culture and open this area as a winter tourist destination. It is anticipated that the event will receive widespread projection in print and electronic media.

In 2023, the rally happened between 6 and 12 February 2023. More than 100 drivers competed in the event.

== Winners ==
Winners of Cholistan Jeep Rally
Winner	Event Edition	Year
Mir Nadir Magsi	10th	2015
Hammad Ahmed Durrani	11th	2016
Mir Nadir Magsi	12th	2017
Mir Nadir Magsi	13th	2018
Mir Nadir Magsi	14th	2019
Mir Nadir Magsi	15th	2020
Sahibzada Sultan	16th	2021
Jaffar Magsi	17th	2022
Fasil Hassan Khan	18th	2023
Zain Mehmood	19th	2024
Zain Mehmood	20th	2025
Khalid Hameed Khan	21st	2026
