= PS-13 Larkana-IV =

Constituency of the Provincial Assembly of Sindh, Pakistan

- Constituency for the Provincial Assembly of Sindh
- Region: Dokri Tehsil and Bakrani Tehsil (partly) of Larkana District
- Electorate: 224,914

Current constituency
- Member: Vacant
- Created from: PS-41 Larkana-VII

PS-13 Larkana-IV (پی ایس-13، لاڑکانہ-4) is a constituency of the Provincial Assembly of Sindh.

== General elections 2024 ==
Provincial election 2024: PS-13 Larkana-IV
Party	Candidate	Votes	%	±%
PPP	Adil Altaf Unnar	89,662	91.72	
JUI (F)	Naseer Muhammad	4,028	4.12	
Independent	Liaquat Ali Mirani	2,165	2.22	
TLP	Zubair Ahmed	1,905	1.95	
Turnout		100,394	44.64	
Total valid votes		97,760	97.38	
Rejected ballots		2,634	2.62	
Majority		85,634	87.60	
Registered electors		224,914		

== General elections 2018 ==
Contesting candidates	Party affiliation	Votes polled

== General elections 2013 ==
Contesting candidates	Party affiliation	Votes polled

== General elections 2008 ==
Contesting candidates	Party affiliation	Votes polled

== See also ==
- PS-12 Larkana-III
- PS-14 Qambar Shahdadkot-I
