= Jameel Ahmed Soomro =

Member of the Provincial Assembly of Sindh from Larkana (2024–2029)

- جمیل احمد سُومرو

Member of the Provincial Assembly of Sindh
- Incumbent
- Assumed office 25 February 2024
- Constituency: PS-11 Larkana-II

Personal details
- Party: PPP (2024-present)

Jameel Ahmed Soomro (Sindhi: جميل احمد سومرو; Urdu: جمیل احمد سُومرو) is a Pakistani politician who is a member of the Provincial Assembly of Sindh.

== Political career ==
Soomro won the 2024 Sindh provincial election from PS-11 Larkana-II as a Pakistan People’s Party candidate. He received 41,158 votes while runner up Kazim Ali Khan of Grand Democratic Alliance received 20,807 votes.
