= Khursheed Ahmed Junejo =

Pakistani politician

- خورشيد احمد جوڻيجو

Member of the National Assembly of Pakistan
- In office 29 April 2024 – present
- Constituency: NA-196 Qambar Shahdadkot-I
- In office 13 August 2018 – 10 August 2023
- Constituency: NA-201 (Larkana-II)

Member of the Provincial Assembly of Sindh
- In office 29 May 2013 – 28 May 2018
- Constituency: PS-38 Larkana-cum-Qambar Shahdadkot-I

Personal details
- Born: 11 October 1954 (age 71) Larkana, Sindh, Pakistan
- Party: PPP (2013-present)

Khursheed Ahmed Junejo (Sindhi: خورشيد احمد جوڻيجو) is a Pakistani politician who has been a Member of the National Assembly of Pakistan since April 2024 and previously served in this position from August 2018 till August 2023. Previously he was a member of the Provincial Assembly of Sindh, from May 2013 to May 2018.

== Early life and education ==
He was born on 11 October 1954 in Larkana.

He has a degree of Bachelors of Science and degree of Master of Arts in International Relation.

== Political career ==
He was elected to the Provincial Assembly of Sindh as a candidate of Pakistan Peoples Party (PPP) from Constituency PS-38 Larkana-cum-Qambar Shahdadkot-I in the 2013 Pakistani general election.

He was elected to the National Assembly of Pakistan as a candidate of PPP from NA-201 (Larkana-II) in the 2018 Pakistani general election.

He was re-elected to the National Assembly as a candidate of PPP from NA-196 Qambar Shahdadkot-I in the 2024 Pakistani by-elections. He received 91,581 votes and defeated Muhammad Ali, a candidate of Tehreek-e-Labbaik Pakistan (TLP).
