= Dokri =

Dokri ڏوڪري
- Town
- Location in Pakistan
- Coordinates: 27°22′29″N 68°05′50″E
- Country: Pakistan
- Province: Sindh
- Region: Sindh
- District: Larkano
- Capital: Dokri
- Towns: 2
- Union Councils: 13

Area
  - Total: 4 km^{2} (1.5 sq mi)
- Highest elevation: 39 m (128 ft)

Population
  - Total: ~125,000
- Time zone: UTC+5 (PST)
  - Summer (DST): UTC+6 (PDT)
- Postal code: 07760
- Area code: 074

Dokri (Sindhi: ڏوڪري) is a town in Larkana District, Sindh province of Pakistan and is the capital town of the Dokri Taluka. The town is located at 27° 22' 29" N 68° 05' 50" E and has an elevation of 39 metres.
