= Ghanwer Ali Khan Isran =

Pakistani politician

Member of the Provincial Assembly of Sindh
- In office 13 August 2018 – 11 August 2023
- Constituency: PS-15 Qambar Shahdadkot-II

Personal details
- Party: Pakistan Peoples Party

Ghanwer Ali Khan Isran is a Pakistani politician who had been a member of the Provincial Assembly of Sindh from August 2018 till August 2023.

== Political career ==
He was elected to the Provincial Assembly of Sindh as a candidate of the Pakistan Peoples Party (PPP) from PS-15 Qambar Shahdadkot-II in the 2018 Sindh provincial election.
