= Qubo Saeed Khan Tehsil =

Tehsil in Sindh, Pakistan

Qubo Saeed khan Tehsil قبو سعید خان تعلقو قبو سعيد خان تعلقہ
- Tehsil and Town
- Interactive map of Qubo Saeed khan Tehsil
- Coordinates: 27°52′28″N 67°42′32″E
- Country: Pakistan
- Province: Sindh
- Division: Larkana Division
- District: Qambar Shahdadkot District
- Post/zip code: 77310

Qubo Saeed Khan Tehsil is a tehsil and town of the Qambar Shahdadkot District, Sindh Province of Pakistan.

== Demographics ==
=== Population ===
The population of Tehsil Qaboo Saeed Khan in the 2023 census is 99,308.
