= Qambar Tehsil =

Tehsil in Sindh, Pakistan

Qambar Tehsil قمبر تعلقو قمبر تعلقہ
- Tehsil and Town
- Interactive map of Qambar Tehsil
- Coordinates: 27.58684°N 68.00187°E
- Country: Pakistan
- Province: Sindh
- Division: Larkana Division
- District: Qambar Shahdadkot District

Qambar Tehsil is a Tehsil of Qambar Shahdadkot District in the Sindh Province of Pakistan.

== Demographics ==
=== Population ===
As of the 2023 census, Qambar Tehsil had a population of 448,990.
