= Nida Khuhro =

Pakistani politician

Member of the Provincial Assembly of Sindh
- In office 13 August 2018 – 11 August 2023
- Constituency: Reserved Seat for Women (RSW-136)

Personal details
- Party: PPP (2018-present)
- Parent: Nisar Khuhro (father)

Nida Khuhro is a Pakistani politician who had been a member of the Provincial Assembly of Sindh from August 2018 to August 2023.

== Political career ==
She was elected to the Provincial Assembly of Sindh as a candidate of Pakistan Peoples Party (PPP) on reserved seat for women (RSW-136) in the 2018 Sindh Provincial Elections.

She is a member of the following standing committees in the Provincial Assembly of Sindh:

1. Standing Committee on Finance.
2. Standing Committee on Food.
3. Standing Committee on Higher Education, Technical Education and Research, School Education (upto Matriculation) and Special Education.
4. Standing Committee on Services, General Administration and Coordination Department (Services, GA, I&C & IPC Wings).
