= PS-10 Larkana-I =

Constituency of the Provincial Assembly of Sindh, Pakistan

- Constituency for the Provincial Assembly of Sindh
- Region: Ratodero Tehsil, Naudero Tehsil and Larkana Tehsil (partly) of Larkana District
- Electorate: 244,677

Current constituency
- Member: Vacant
- Created from: PS-37 Larkana-III

PS-10 Larkana-I (پی ایس-10، لاڑکانہ-1) is a constituency of the Provincial Assembly of Sindh.

== General elections 2024 ==
Provincial election 2024: PS-10 Larkana-I
Party	Candidate	Votes	%	±%
PPP	Faryal Talpur	85,920	75.98	
JUI (F)	Kifayatullah	18,477	16.34	
TLP	Muhammad Arshad Bhutto	3,552	3.14	
Others	Others (seven candidates)	5,136	4.54	
Turnout		117,266	47.93	
Total valid votes		113,085	96.44	
Rejected ballots		4,181	3.56	
Majority		67,443	59.64	
Registered electors		244,677		

== General elections 2018 ==
Contesting candidates	Party affiliation	Votes polled
Faryal Talpur	PPP	441,894

== General elections 2013 ==
Contesting candidates	Party affiliation	Votes polled

== General elections 2008 ==
Contesting candidates	Party affiliation	Votes polled

== See also ==
- PS-9 Shikarpur-III
- PS-11 Larkana-II
