= Sohail Anwar Siyal =

Pakistani politician

Provincial Minister For Agriculture, Supply And Prices, Mines & Mineral And Home
- In office June 2013 – 28 May 2018

Member of the Provincial Assembly of Sindh
- In office 13 August 2018 – 11 August 2023
- Constituency: PS-12 Larkana-III
- In office 29 May 2013 – 28 May 2018
- Constituency: PS-35 Larkana-I

Provincial Minister for Irrigation, Zakat Establishment
- In office 5 August 2019 – 11 August 2023

Personal details
- Born: 26 June 1975 (age 50) Larkana, Sindh, Pakistan
- Party: PPP (2013-present)

Sohail Anwar Siyal (Sindhi: سهيل انور سِيال; born 26 June 1975) is a Pakistani politician who was born in Larkana. He was a member of the Provincial Assembly of Sindh from August 2018 till August 2023. He had also been the Provincial Minister of Irrigation and Zakat Establishment from August 2019 till August 2023. Previously, he had been the Provincial Minister for Agriculture, Supply & Prices, Mines & Minerals, and Home from June 2013 to May 2018. He had also been a member of the Provincial Assembly of Sindh from May 2013 to May 2018. He received a BA degree from Shah Latif University Khairpur and a Civil Engineering degree from Mehran University Jamshoro.

== Political career ==
He was elected to the Provincial Assembly of Sindh as a candidate of Pakistan Peoples Party (PPP) from PS-35 Larkana-I in the 2013 Sindh provincial election.

He was re-elected to Provincial Assembly of Sindh as a candidate of PPP from PS-12 Larkana-III in the 2018 Sindh provincial election.
