= Altaf Hussain Unar =

Pakistani politician

Haji Altaf Hussain Unar (Urdu: الطاف حسین انڑ; Sindhi: الطاف حسين انڙ) (1954 – 2014) was a politician from Larkana, Sindh, Pakistan. He was elected from the constituency of PS-35 Larkana-I in 2003 as a member of Pakistan Muslim League (Q). He was defeated in 2008 elections by Ghulam Sarwar Khan of Pakistan Peoples Party. He won the 2013 elections on the ticket of Pakistan Peoples Party, but was disqualified by the court on 6 March 2014. Altaf Hussain Unar was arrested in 2008 for firing on the car of his political opponent Azra Pechoho, sister of Asif Zardari, in Nawabshah during the by-election of 2006. Altaf Unnar died at his residence in Karachi on 8 March 2014, two days after his disqualification. He was buried in his native village, Aliabad on Friday evening. He left behind six daughters and three sons.
