= Mir Nadir Ali Khan Magsi =

Pakistani politician

Mir Nadir Ali Khan Magsi Nawabzada

Member of the Provincial Assembly of Sindh
- In office 13 August 2018 – 11 August 2023
- Constituency: PS-14 Qambar Shahdadkot-I
- In office 2008 – 28 May 2018
- Constituency: PS-40 Qambar Shahdadkot-II

Provincial Minister of Sindh for Food
- In office April 2008 – 2013

Personal details
- Born: 8 November 1958 (age 67)
- Party: PPP (2008-present)
- Height: 5.7 (170 cm)
- Relatives: Zulfiqar Ali Khan Magsi(Brother) Khalid Husain Magsi(Brother) Nawabzada Tariq Magsi(Brother) Mir Amer Ali Khan Magsi(Brother) Dina Rohinton Patel (Relative)

Nawabzada Mir Nadir Ali Khan Magsi is a Pakistani politician who had been a member of the Provincial Assembly of Sindh from August 2018 till August 2023. He previously served in this position from 2008 to May 2018.

== Early life ==
He was born on 8 November 1958. He is a Baloch by ethnicity.

== Political career ==
He was elected to the Provincial Assembly of Sindh as a candidate of Pakistan Peoples Party (PPP) from PS-40 Qambar Shahdadkot-II in the 2008 Sindh provincial election. In April 2008, he was inducted into the provincial Sindh cabinet of Chief Minister Syed Qaim Ali Shah and was made Provincial Minister of Sindh for Food. Between 2011 and 2012, Magsi was the wealthiest member of Sindh Assembly according to the Election Commission of Pakistan.

He was re-elected to the Provincial Assembly of Sindh as a candidate of PPP from PS-40 Qambar Shahdadkot-II in the 2013 Sindh provincial election.

He was re-elected to Provincial Assembly of Sindh as a candidate of PPP from PS-14 Qambar Shahdadkot-I in the 2018 Sindh provincial election.

== Sports career ==
In 2011, Magsi won the 194-kilometre track Jhal Magsi Desert Challenge. In 2012, he won the Thar Desert Rally. In 2017, he won the 2nd Thal Jeep Rally after covering the 180-kilometre desert track in two hours and 17 minutes. He received the Rs.150,000 cash prize. In February 2020 Desert Jeep Rally was conducted in Bahawalpur. He also won Desert Rally, 2020. Starting from the year 2022, Nadir Magsi has scored the second position at the Cholistan Jeep Rally, shortly followed by a victory at the 2nd Derajat Offroad Rally securing the first position and the Fastest Time of The Day. Well respected by his fellow race drivers Nadir Ali Magsi also received a special price at the 2nd Derajat Rally thanking him for his dedication and support towards off-road racing in Pakistan and always being present to lend a helping hand. The year 2022 saw Nadir Ali Magsi on the podium with the 1st position at the Thar Off-road Jeep Rally along with the second position at the Hab Rally. Mir Nadir Ali Magsi won the 1st position in the 7th Thal Jeep Rally Muzaffargarh on 20th November 2022. Most recently, he placed second place at the Jhal Magsi Desert Challenge.
