= Mirokhan Tehsil =

Mirokhan Taluka تعلقہ میرو خان ميرو خان تعلقو
- Taluka (Tehsil)
- Interactive map of Mirokhan Taluka
- Coordinates: 27°45′35″N 68°05′30″E
- Country: Pakistan
- Province: Sindh
- District: Qambar Shahdadkot District
- Tehsil: Mirokhan Tehsil
- Tehsil created: 1915

Government
  - Type: Commissioner system
- Elevation: 147 m (482 ft)

Population
  - Total: 10,590
- Time zone: UTC+5 (PST)
- Area code: 074

Mirokhan is one of the oldest tehsils situated in Qambar Shahdadkot District (Previously Larkana District) of Sindh province of Pakistan. It was established in 1915 and was considered to be the largest tehsil by area before the division of the Larkana district into Larkana and Qambar-Shahdadkot districts, its own division into Mirokhan and Sijawal tehsils.

Situated about 55 km away from the Indus valley's most famous site Mohenjo-daro, 27 km from Larkana. Mirokhan is famous for shrine of a great Islamic scholar and saint, Mian Hamidullah Huzuri (Huzuri Badshah).

The town is connected by road directly to Qambar, Sijawal Junejo, Shahdadkot, Ratodero and Larkana. Mirokhan has various types of academic institutes from primary level to diploma-awarding colleges for both boys and girls.

Many people from different caste backgrounds live in the city including, Syed, Jokhio, Dayo, Tunio, Bhatti, Buriro Gopang, Magsi, Chandio, Laghari, Memon and Abro (Sindhi) casts. There are many villages in its surroundings, such as densely populated Nau Thaaro Wadho, Bhanbho khan chandio, Allahyar Mastoi, and Dirb Chandio.

Arzi Bhutto Square is considered as Mirokhan's business centre.

Near Mirokhan town, there is a village Karam Ali Khan Gopang, where Syed and Gopang communities live.

== Geography ==
Mirokhan is situated at Latitude 27,7667 (2746'0.120"N) and Longitude 68,1000 (685'60.000"E). It is situated in North-western Sindh.

== Climate ==
Mirokhan is in Monsoon climatic region. Summer is extremely hot as temperature reaches at 53 °C and winter is a little cool as temperature drops to -2 °C. This hot weather sometime cost human lives. Hot weather keeps many in the city to remain at home, several cases of fainting are occasionally reported. Hot days continue from May till September, followed by Monsoon Rains, sometime bringing floods in the nearby areas. Monsoon season starts from July and continues till September and brings Torrential Rains. Pre-Monsoon also occurs occasionally in the month of June while post-Monsoon occurs rarely.

Duststorms are also very common in summer and monsoon seasons, especially from March to September.

== Demographics ==
Religions in Mirokhan
Religions	Percent
Islam	99.5%
Others	0.5%

The majority of the population of both the town and & the tehsil of Mirokhan speak the native Sindhi language. Urdu and English are also widely spoken and understood.

== Economy ==
Mirokhan is surrounded by a fertile land, where mainly rice and wheat, including potatoes, melons, olives, oranges, peas, carrots, cucumber, mangoes and guava are also cultivated.

== Transport ==
Moenjodaro Airport is located near the ancient site of Mohen-jo-daro, 56 km away to the south west of the town Mirokhan. Mirokhan is connected via land buses to most towns in the surroundings, including Larkana, Sijawal Junejo, Shahdadkot, Ratodero and Qambar. Passenger buses run between Mirokhan and Karachi, Hyderabad, Sukkur and Gharhi Khairo, Larkana

== Sports ==
Many domestic and international games are played in the town, including Hockey & Cricket. Mirokhan has also a sports stadium.

== Health ==
Mirokhan tehsil headquarter has secondary care hospital, with many specialists for the local people.

== See also ==
- Larkana
- Qambar Shahdadkot District
