= Nisar Khuhro =

Pakistani politician

Nisar Ahmed Khuhro
- نثار احمد کھوڑو
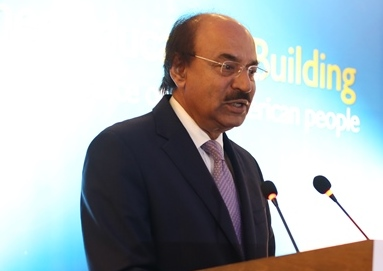

Member of Senate of Pakistan
- Incumbent
- Assumed office March 2022
- Preceded by: Faisal Vawda

Advisor on Works and Services
- In office 5 August 2019 – 5 August 2021
- Governor: Imran Ismail
- Chief Minister: Murad Ali Shah

Advisor on Universities and Boards
- In office 5 August 2019 – 5 August 2021
- Governor: Imran Ismail
- Chief Minister: Murad Ali Shah

Senior Minister of Sindh on Education and Literacy
- In office 2013–2016
- Governor: Ishrat-ul-Ibad Khan
- Chief Minister: Syed Qaim Ali Shah

Provincial Minister of Sindh for Food
- In office 2016–2018
- Governor: Ishrat-ul-Ibad Khan; Saeeduzzaman Siddiqui; Muhammad Zubair Umar
- Chief Minister: Murad Ali Shah

Provincial Minister of Sindh for Parliamentary Affairs
- In office 2016–2018
- Governor: Ishrat-ul-Ibad Khan; Saeeduzzaman Siddiqui; Mohammad Zubair
- Chief Minister: Murad Ali Shah

Speaker of the Provincial Assembly of Sindh
- In office 2008–2013
- Deputy: Shehla Raza

Leader of Opposition in the Provincial Assembly of Sindh
- In office 2002–2007
- Governor: Muhammad Mian Soomro; Ishrat-ul-Ibad Khan
- In office 1997–1999
- Governor: Kamaluddin Azfar; Moinuddin Haider

Provincial Minister Sindh for Planning and Development
- In office 1993–1996
- Governor: Hakeem Saeed; Mahmoud Haroon; Kamaluddin Azfar
- Chief Minister: Syed Abdullah Ali Shah

Deputy Leader of Opposition in the Provincial Assembly of Sindh
- In office 1990–1993
- Governor: Mahmoud Haroon
- Leader of Opposition: Syed Qaim Ali Shah

Provincial Assembly of Sindh
- In office 2013–2018
- Constituency: PS-36 (Larkana-II)
- In office 2008–2013
- Constituency: PS-36 (Larkana-II)
- In office 2002–2007
- Constituency: PS-36 (Larkana-II)
- In office 20 February 1997 – 12 October 1999
- Constituency: PS-31 (Larkana-III)
- In office 18 October 1993 – 7 November 1996
- Constituency: PS-33 (Larkana-V)
- In office 4 November 1990 – 19 July 1993
- Constituency: PS-33 (Larkana-V)
- In office 19 November 1988 – 6 August 1990
- Constituency: PS-33 (Larkana-V)

Personal details
- Born: 22 September 1950 (age 76) Larkana, Sindh, Pakistan
- Party: PPP (1988-present)
- Relations: Nida Khuhro (daughter)
- Children: Sheherazade Khuhro; Nida Khuhro; Preha Khuhro; Sehar Aman Khuhro; Maham Khuhro; Moosa Khuhro; Muhammad Nawaz Khuhro

Senator Nisar Ahmad Khuhro (Sindhi: سينيٽر نثار احمد کھڙو;Urdu: نثار احمد کھوڑو) is a Pakistani politician from Sindh, currently serving as a member of the Senate of Pakistan since March 2022. He is also the President of the Sindh chapter of the Pakistan Peoples Party (PPP).

== Early life and family ==
Born on 22 September 1950 in Larkana, Sindh, Khuro received his primary education from Pilot Secondary School in Larkana, completed his Intermediate studies at D. J. Sindh Government Science College in Karachi, and graduated from Karachi university. He also pursued vocational education in Frankfurt, Germany.

His daughter, Nida Khuhro, is a member of the Provincial Assembly of Sindh.

== Political career ==
Khuhro is the Provincial President of Pakistan Peoples Party's Sindh chapter since October 2016.

He also served as the Advisor of Chief Minister of Sindh on Works and Services and also on Universities and Boards with the status of a Provincial Minister from August 2019 to August 2021 holding additional charge of the Pro-Chancellor of all public universities in Sindh.

He has served as the Senior Minister of Sindh on Education and Provincial Minister of Sindh on Parliamentary Affairs and Food from 2013 to 2016 and 2016 till 2018.

Khuhro was the Speaker of the Provincial Assembly of Sindh from 2008 till 2013.

He was the Leader of Opposition in the Provincial Assembly of Sindh twice from 1997 till 1999 and again from 2002 till 2007.

Nisar was the Provincial Minister of Sindh for Planning and Development from 1993 to 1996.

From 1990 till 1993 he was the Deputy Leader of the Opposition in Provincial Assembly of Sindh, serving as deputy of Syed Qaim Ali Shah who was the Leader of Opposition Sindh at that time.

Nisar remained a Member of the Provincial Assembly of Sindh continuously from 1988 till 2018 representing Larkana.

In 2016, he moved the Sindh Hindu Marriage Bill which was later passed to become the first Hindu marriage act in Pakistan.

On 9 March 2022, Nisar Khuhro was elected as a member of the Senate of Pakistan on the seat vacated by former PTI senator Faisal Vawda.

== Personal life ==
Nisar Khuhro married thrice. His first wife Shahnaz Nisar Khuhro died in 2005. Nisar is also married Gul-e-Lala Khuhro and Khatija Nisar. Nisar Khuhro is blessed with five kids, three daughters, namely, Nida Khuhro, Sehar Aman Khuhro and Maham Khuhro and two sons, namely Muhammad Moosa Khuhro and Muhammad Nawaz Khuhro. Khuhro's eldest daughter Nida Khuhro is active in politics of Sindh from Larkana.
