= Shahdadkot Tehsil =

Tehsil in Sindh, Pakistan

Shahdadkot Tehsil شہدادکوٹ تعلقہ شھدادڪوٽ تعلقو
- Tehsil and Town
- Interactive map of Shahdadkot Tehsil
- Coordinates: 27°50′49″N 67°54′29″E
- Country: Pakistan
- Province: Sindh
- Division: Larkana Division
- District: Qambar Shahdadkot District

Population
  - Total: 225,086

Shahdadkot Tehsil is a tehsil of Qambar Shahdadkot District in Sindh, Pakistan. According to the 2023 national census, it had a population of 225,086.
