= Qambar =

City in Sindh

Coordinates: 27°59′N 68°39′E

Qambar, is the headquarter of the Qambar Shahdadkot District of Sindh. It has a district court and district level government offices.

== History ==
Qamber town was part of Larkana District until December 2004 when the Sindh government announced the creation of a new district and made it the capital of the new Qambar-Shahdad Kot District.

== Demographics ==
At the 2023 census, the Kambar Municipal Committee had a population of 112,313, up from 100,970 in 2017.

== See also ==
- Qambar Shahdadkot District
- Shahdadkot Tehsil
