= PS-11 Larkana-II =

Constituency of the Provincial Assembly of Sindh, Pakistan

- Constituency for the Provincial Assembly of Sindh
- Region: Larkana Tehsil (partly) including Larkana city of Larkana District
- Electorate: 438,208

Current constituency
- Member: Vacant
- Created from: PS-36 Larkana-II

PS-11 Larkana-II (پی ایس-11، لاڑکانہ-2) is a constituency of the Provincial Assembly of Sindh.

== General elections 2024 ==
Provincial election 2024: PS-11 Larkana-II
| Party | Candidate | Votes | % | ±% |
|---|---|---|---|---|
| PPP | Jameel Ahmed Soomro | 41,441 | 60.28 | |
| GDA | Kazim Ali Khan | 20,871 | 30.36 | |
| PTI | Mahjabeen (Note: Filed nomination papers as PTI candidate but ECP allowed him to run as an Independent) | 2,136 | 3.11 | |
| Independent | Abdul Rauf Shaikh | 1,383 | 2.01 | |
| Others | Others (fourteen candidates) | 2,917 | 4.24 | |
| Turnout | | 71,458 | 36.92 | |
| Total valid votes | | 68,748 | 96.21 | |
| Rejected ballots | | 2,710 | 3.79 | |
| Majority | | 20,570 | 29.92 | |
| Registered electors | | 193,531 | | |

== General elections 2018 ==
| Contesting candidates | Party affiliation | Votes polled |

== General elections 2013 ==
| Contesting candidates | Party affiliation | Votes polled |

== General elections 2008 ==
| Contesting candidates | Party affiliation | Votes polled |

== See also ==
- PS-10 Larkana-I
- PS-12 Larkana-III
