= Bakrani Tehsil =

Bakrani Tehsil تعلقہ باقرانی باقراڻي تعلقو
- Taluka (Tehsil)
- Interactive map of Bakrani Tehsil
- Country: Pakistan
- Region: Sindh
- District: Larkana District
- Capital: Bakrani
- Towns: 1
- Union councils: 11
- Languages: Sindhi and Saraiki

Population (2015)
  - Total: 455,834
- Time zone: UTC+5 (PST)

Bakrani Tehsil (Sindhi: تعلقو باڪراڻي) is a newly created Tehsil of Larkana. It is situated in the south of Larkana city between tehsil Larkana and taluka Dokri. Main villages of the Taluka are: Bakrani, Arija, Hyder Brohi Gul Muhammad Tunio, Ganja Tunia, Village Hakeem Sandilo, Village Kumbi Sandilo, Village Butta Kalhora, Goth Pathan, Goth Ghulam Nabi Khan Jatoi, Farid Abad, Gerilo, Goth Mehrab Kalhoro, Village Fazul Kalhoro, Village Chutto Kalhoro, Village ghazi Mashori,village Ramzan Kalhoro, Mehrabpur Jatoi, Bakho Dero, Chatto Wahan Mad Bahu. Main crops and vegetables grown in the taluka are: rice, wheat, cauliflower, spinach, onion, turnip etc. Agricultural land is irrigated by Rice and Dadu canals. Taluka has number of rice and wood mills and ice factories. Its postal code is 77110.
