= Faryal Talpur =

Pakistani politician

- فريال ٽالپر

President PPP Women’s Wing
- Incumbent
- Assumed office 1 February 2009

Member of the Provincial Assembly of Sindh
- Incumbent
- Assumed office 13 August 2018
- Constituency: PS-10 Larkana-I

Member of the National Assembly of Pakistan
- In office 1 June 2013 – 31 May 2018
- Constituency: NA-207 (Larkana-IV)
- In office 17 March 2008 – 16 March 2013
- Constituency: NA-207 (Larkana-IV)

Personal details
- Born: 26 April 1958 (age 68) Nawabshah, Sindh, Pakistan
- Party: PPP (2008-present)
- Spouse: Mir Munawar Ali Talpur
- Parent(s): Hakim Ali Zardari; Bilquis Sultana
- Relatives: See Zardari family

Faryal Talpur (Sindhi: فريال ٽالپر; Urdu: فریال تالپور; née Zardari; born 26 April 1958) is a Pakistani politician who had been a member of National Assembly of Pakistan from 2008 to May 2018 and a member of the Provincial Assembly of Sindh since August 2018, as well as the President of the Women Wing of the Pakistan People's Party.

== Early life and family ==
Talpur was born on 26 April 1958 in Nawabshah, Pakistan to Hakim Ali Zardari and Bilquis Sultana. She belongs to Baloch family from Nawabshah, Sindh. She is the sister of Asif Zardari, the President of Pakistan, and Azra Fazal Pechuho, a politician, and the sister-in-law of former Prime Minister of Pakistan Benazir Bhutto. Besides Zardari and Pechuho, she has another sister Fouzia Abbasi, who is not active in politics.

She is married to Mir Munawar Ali Talpur. She has 3 daughters; Aysha, Fatima and Tania Talpur.

== Political career ==
Talpur began her political career in 1990s. She ran for the seat of National Assembly of Pakistan on the Pakistan Peoples Party (PPP) ticket from Nawabshah constituency (NA-160) in the 1997 Pakistani general election for the first time, but lost the election to the Pakistan Muslim League (N). In 2001, she became the Nazim of district Nawabshah in local government elections. In 2005 local government elections, she was re-elected as the mayor of Nawabshah.

After the assassination of Benazir Bhutto in 2007, she became legal guardian of children of Bhutto; Bilawal Bhutto Zardari, Bakhtawar Bhutto Zardari and Aseefa Bhutto Zardari and custodian of property of Bhutto in Larkana. In 2007, Talpur was considered to become a candidate of PPP for the post of President of Pakistan.

Due to mayorship of Nawabshah, she was not given a ticket by PPP to run in the 2008 Pakistani general election. However, later in by-elections, she was allotted a ticket by PPP to run for the seat of National Assembly home constituency of Bhutto in constituency NA-207 (Larkana-cum-Shikarpur-cum-Kambar Shahdadkot) where election was postponed due to death of Bhutto. She won in the by-elections and became member of the National Assembly for the first time. She was the central president of the women wing of PPP but reportedly she looked after almost all affairs of the PPP. Talpur is described as a tough and stubborn woman.

According to a WikiLeaks diplomatic cables leak in 2009, fearing attempts on his life, then President of Pakistan Asif Ali Zardari told then US Ambassador to Pakistan Anne W. Patterson that in the event he was assassinated, he had instructed his son Bilawal Bhutto Zardari to appoint Talpur as President of Pakistan. The diplomatic cable also revealed the remarks by then Chief of Army Staff of Pakistan General Ashfaq Pervaiz Kayani who said that Talpur would make a better president than Asif Ali Zardari. She was re-elected as the member of the National Assembly of the second time in the 2013 Pakistani general election from NA-207 Larkana constituency.

She was re-elected to Provincial Assembly of Sindh as a candidate of PPP from PS-10 (Larkana-I) in the 2018 Sindh provincial election.

She is the member of the following committees:

- Public Accounts Committee
- Standing Committee on Energy
- Standing Committee on Home (Chairperson Committee)
- Standing Committee on Works & Services
