= Bakrani =

Bakrani (Baqrani) Baqrani Bakrani
- Town
- باڪراڻي
- Interactive map of Bakrani (Baqrani)
- Coordinates: 27°26′46.66″N 68°11′07.11″E
- Country: Pakistan
- Province: Sindh
- District: Larkana
- Highest elevation: 52 m (169 ft)

Population
  - Total: ~30,000
- Time zone: UTC+5 (PST)
- Postal code: 77110
- Area code: 074

Bakrani (Sindhi: باڪراڻي) is a town in Larkana District, Sindh province of Pakistan. This town is situated 11 km south of Larkana and 17 km north of Mohan-Jo-Daro on the Larkana–Mohenjo-daro road. It has an altitude of 53 meters and is the headquarters of Bakrani Taluka. Bakrani was the taluka headquarters of Lab-e-Daryah taluka. More than 70% of peoples depend on farming and the main income source in area is agriculture.

Gereelo is a small town in the jurisdiction of the Bakrani subdivision, approximately 10 kilometers away from the subdivision headquarters.

There is a railway station, called as Bakrani Station.

Bakrani is the maternal home town (Thullah) of Fahad Mustafa, a famous actor and celebrity in Pakistan.
