= Dokri Tehsil =

Dokri Taluka تعلقہ ڈوکری ڏوڪري تعلقو
- Taluka (Tehsil)
- Location in Pakistan
- Coordinates: 27°22′29.0″N 68°05′50.0″E
- Country: Pakistan
- Province: Sindh
- District: Larkana
- Tehsil: Dokri
- Towns: 2
- Union Councils: 13
- Tehsil created: 1906

Government
  - Type: Tehsil Municipal Administration

Area
  - Taluka (Tehsil): 4 km^{2} (1.5 sq mi)
  - Metro: 2 km^{2} (0.77 sq mi)
- Elevation: 39 m (128 ft)

Population (1998)
  - Taluka (Tehsil): 125,000
- Time zone: UTC+5 (PST)
  - Summer (DST): UTC+6 (PDT)
- Area code: 074

Dokri Tehsil (Sindhi: ڏوڪري تعلقو) is an administrative subdivision (tehsil) of Larkana District in the Sindh province of Pakistan, the city of Dokri is the capital.

== Administration ==
Dokri tehsil is administratively subdivided into 13 Union Councils.
