= Qambar Shahdadkot District =

Coordinates: 27°35′21″N 68°00′00″E

Qambar Shahdadkot District ضلع قمبر-شہدادکوٹ قمبر شهدادڪوٽ ضلعو
- District of Sindh
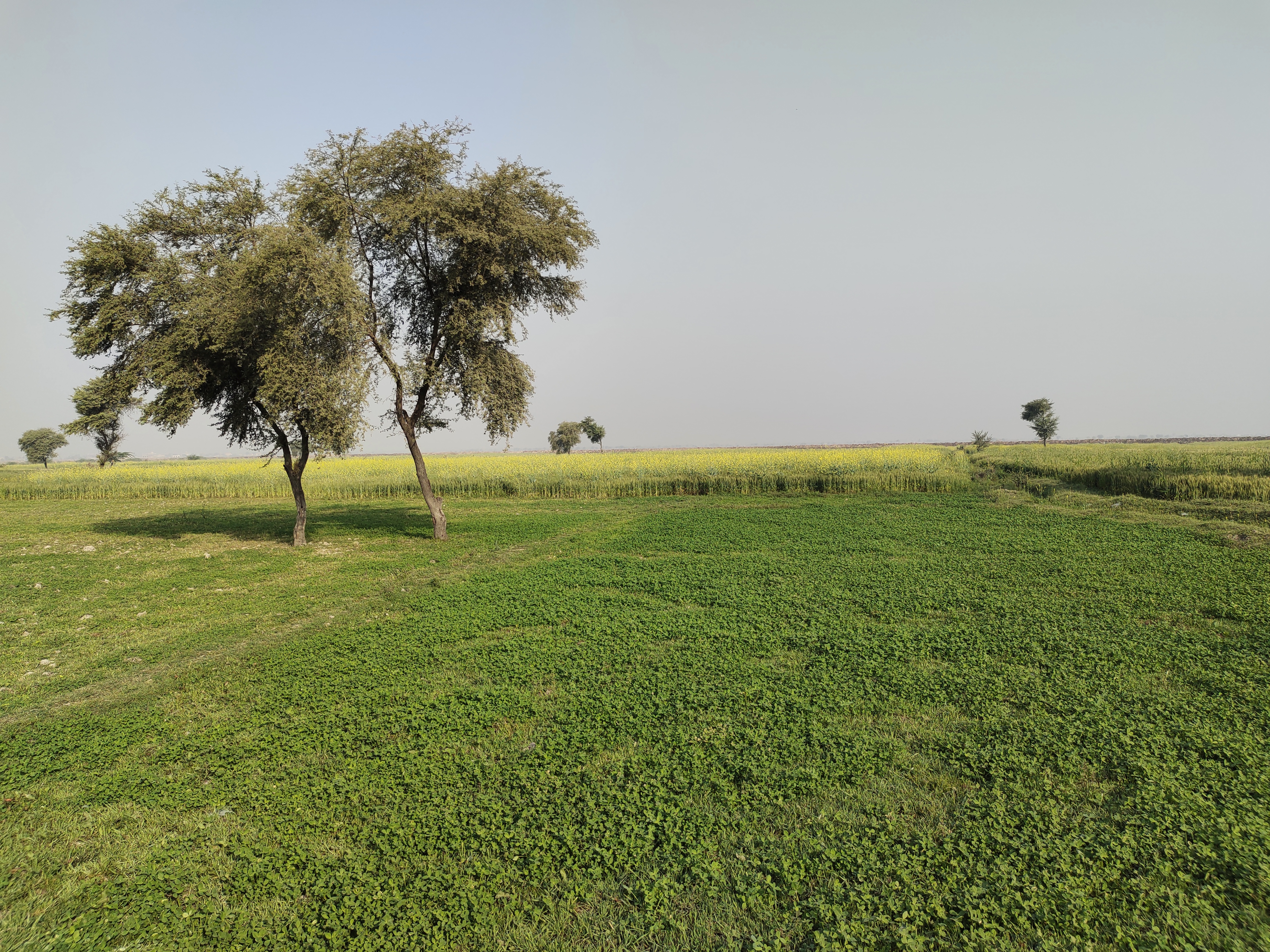
- Fields of Cabbage in Umeed Ali Junejo village
- Interactive map of Qambar Shahdadkot District
- Country: Pakistan
- Province: Sindh
- Division: Larkana
- District created: 2004
- Headquarters: Qambar

Government
  - Type: District Administration
  - Deputy Commissioner: Sajjad Haider Qadri PAS
  - SSP: Bashir Ahmed Brohi PSP
  - District Health Officer: N/A

Area
  - District of Sindh: 5,475 km^{2} (2,114 sq mi)

Population (2023)
  - District of Sindh: 1,514,869
  - Density: 276.7/km^{2} (716.6/sq mi)
  - Urban: 421,865 (27.84%)
  - Rural: 1,093,004 (72.16%)

Literacy
  - Literacy rate: Total: 40.02%; Male: 48.94%; Female: 30.35%
- Time zone: UTC+5 (PST)
- Website: www.sindh.gov.pk

Qambar Shahdadkot District (Sindhi: ضلعو قمبر شهداد ڪوٽ, Urdu: ضلع قمبر-شہدادکوٹ) is a district of Sindh, Pakistan, originally named after Shahdad Khan Khuhawar, the official founder. District Qambar Shahdadkot, with headquarters at Qambar,was established on 13 December 2004.

Taluka Qambar and Shahdadkot Tehsil were part of Larkana District since long before they were combined and made one district for administrative purposes. At first, it was named only Qambar but because of dissent from the people of Shahdadkot city, the name Shahdadkot was added. Today, however, the locals of Shahdadkot demand a separate district comprising Shahdadkot, Qubo Saeed Khan and Sijawal Junejo as they face difficulties in governmental work because they must go a long distance to Qambar to get the work done because most government offices are there. The district was created in the tenure of Chief Minister Arbab Ghulam Rahim, who is accused of creating this district for political gains and to weaken the stronghold of the Pakistan People's Party in the area because Shahdadkot has been the electoral constituency for Shaheed Benazir Bhutto. The creation of the district benefited a family, who are the landlords of Qambar Shahdadkot. In 2005, Nawab Shabbir Khan Chandio became the first elected nazim of the newly created district.

== History ==
Warah Tehsil of Qambar-Shahdadkot had a Soomra town named "Junani" during the mid 1350's. It was visited by the famous Moroccan traveler Ibn Battuta in 1333 AD. Inspection Bungalow and ruins of the same name still exist there today.

The district was split from Larkana District in December 2005. There was some controversy over the name of the district, with Qambar being favoured initially, but after protests from residents of Shahdadkot, it was renamed to Qambar-Shahdadkot District. The headquarters of the district is Qambar city.

== Administrative divisions ==
The total area of District Qambar Shahdadkot is 1,453,383 acres. District Council Qambar Shahdadkot has 52 union councils, two municipal committees and seven town committees. The district is divided into seven tehsils:

Tehsil	Area (km²)	Pop. (2023)	Density (ppl/km²) (2023)	Literacy rate (2023)
Mirokhan Tehsil	374	182,461	96,091	33.41%
Nasirabad Tehsil	309	174,708	91,575	41.81%
Qambar Tehsil	2,260	448,990	234,516	39.36%
Qubo Saeed Khan Tehsil	1,033	99,308	51,360	26.46%
Shahdadkot Tehsil	419	225,086	117,532	47.06%
Sijawal Junejo Tehsil	385	130,635	67,877	37.66%
Warah Tehsil	695	253,681	132,165	44.25%

The district government comprises seven groups of offices i.e. health, education, works and services, finance and planning, community development, revenue and agriculture besides district administration comprising a District Nazim (mayor), Naib Nazim (deputy mayor) and District Coordination Officer.

== Education ==
According to a survey conducted by Sindh Education Management Information System in 2010–2011, there are 377 schools for boys, 306 schools for girls, and 997 co-ed schools. The boys' schools enroll 7538 students, and the girls' schools enroll 33,061. The total number of all enrolled students is 195,774. The total number of teachers in the district is 4239, of whom, 3411 are male and 828 are female. The student to teacher ratio is 46. The number of functional schools in urban areas is 91, and in rural areas it is 1439. The total number of closed schools in the district is 150. The total number of schools in Qambar Shahdadkot is 1680.

== Geography ==
Qambar Shahdakot shares its borders with three districts of Balochistan on the west, Khuzdar, Jaffarabad and Jhal Magsi. Its southern borders are connected with Dadu District. Larkana District is on the east and Jacobabad District is on the north.

The district has a variety of features with its vast plains, agricultural land, the mighty mountain range of Kirthar and a number of wetlands including Hamal, Drigh and Langh lakes. The Kirthar extends southward for almost 300 km from the Mula River in east-central Balochistan to Cape Muari (Monze) west of Karachi on the Arabian Sea. Kirthar in Sindhi means 'milk-cream', which is contrary to the environment of the place. It is a range of limestone hills and mountains which is referred to as Hallar by the old writers, but it is commonly known as Kirthar today.

The Kirthar Range also has a national park, which is the second largest wildlife park in the area. It is located between Karachi and Balochistan. This area is covered with limestone hills which rise from 4000 to nearly 8000 feet and are surrounded by the fossilized remnants of different times of history.

The inhabitants of the region are chiefly Sindhis and Balochs who belong to Brahui tribe and they survive by flock graze. Chhuttas of Balochistan, Chandios and Gainchos of Sindh also live in this area.

Rare species of animals are found in Kirthar National Park, including the Sindh wild goat, Indian fox, Egyptian vulture, Indian pangolin, desert wolf, Chinkara gazelle, honey badger, jackal, Asiatic leopard, Bonnelli's eagle, striped hyena, jungle cat, and a number of reptile and bird species.

== Demographics ==
Historical population
Year	Pop.	±% p.a.
1951	258,327	—
1961	299,259	+1.48%
1972	460,722	+4.00%
1981	566,574	+2.32%
1998	924,294	+2.92%
2017	1,338,035	+1.97%
2023	1,514,869	+2.09%

As of the 2023 census, Qambar Shahdadkot district has 267,553 households and a population of 1,514,869. The district has a sex ratio of 109.31 males to 100 females and a literacy rate of 40.02%: 48.94% for males and 30.35% for females. 527,655 (34.83% of the surveyed population) are under 10 years of age. 421,865 (27.85%) live in urban areas.

=== Religion ===
Religions in Qambar Shahdadkot district (2023)
Religion	Percent
Islam	99.17%
Hinduism	0.65%
Other or not stated	0.18%

Religion in contemporary Qambar Shahdadkot District
Religious group	1941		2017		2023	
Religious group	Pop.	%	Pop.	%	Pop.	%
Islam	226,922	87.21%	1,327,507	99.21%	1,502,256	99.17%
Hinduism	33,004	12.68%	9,963	0.74%	9,785	0.65%
Others (Note: Including Jainism, Christianity, Buddhism, Zoroastrianism, Judaism, Ad-Dharmis, or not stated)	165	0.11%	565	0.05%	2,828	0.18%
Total Population	260,191	100%	1,338,035	100%	1,514,869	100%
Note: 1941 census data is for Qambar, Mirokhan, Shahdadkot and Warah talukas of Larkana District, which roughly corresponds to contemporary Qambar Shahdadkot District. District and taluk borders have changed since 1961.

The majority religion is Islam, with 99.17% of the population. Hinduism (including those from Scheduled Castes) is practiced by 0.65% of the population.

=== Language ===
Languages of Qambar Shahdadkot district (2023)
1. Sindhi (96.2%)
2. Brahui (2.58%)
3. Others (1.21%)

At the time of the 2023 census, 96.21% of the population spoke Sindhi and 2.58% Brahui as their first language.

== Industry ==
The Shahdadkot Textile Mills was situated in the north of Shahdadkot City. It employed around 4,500 workers in the district which was previously part of Larkana. The mill was established in 1974 under the orders of Zulfikar Ali Bhutto, then prime minister of Pakistan. Iran had assisted Pakistan for the installation of the mill in Shahdadkot. The mill was started in 1978 and became the source of livelihood of many people living in all four provinces. The cloth from here was sent to Punjab for sale. The mill produced export quality cloth.

Due to political problems after Zulfikar Ali Bhutto's time and financial crisis to the mill, it could not pay salaries to its 4000 workers and this led to the downfall of the mill during Zia's regime. When Benazir Bhutto returned to the government in 1990, the mill again started to produce fine polyester productions of various designs. Abdul Fatah Bhatti, funded by Nisar Memon, a contractor from Karachi, was given complete authorization to operate in the mills. He even expelled the few remaining workers from the Mills and put up a notice of shutting down of the mills on July 8, 2007. Because of political and economic crisis, the mills and the industry in the district suffered and its infrastructure was sold for a petty amount. Now it wears a deserted look.

The present small industries are as follows: electronic goods, agricultural tools, construction material and food processing through bakeries and shops. The cottage industry of embroidery caps particularly in Shahdadkot Taluka has a good market in the district as well as outside the district.

== List of Dehs ==
The following is a list of Qambar Shahdadkot District's dehs, organised by Tehsils:

- Qambar Tehsil (105 Dehs)
  - Abra
  - Acha
  - Aheer
  - Bagh Jagir
  - Bagodero
  - Ber
  - Bhada
  - Bhangar Acha
  - Bharmi
  - Bhola Kalhora
  - Boohar
  - Chacha
  - Chhajra
  - Changro
  - Dera
  - Dhero
  - Dost Ali
  - Drib Mitho
  - Duwabo
  - Elchi
  - Esso
  - F. M. Siyal
  - Fatoohal Wah
  - Ghathar
  - Ghogharo
  - Hani
  - Hasula
  - Hulia
  - Jagir No. 1
  - Jagir No. 2
  - Jagir No. 3
  - Jagir No. 4
  - Jagir No. 5
  - Jagir No. 6
  - Jagir No. 6 Chak No. 2
  - Jagir No. 6 Chak No. 3
  - Jagir No. 6 Chak No. 4
  - Jagir No. 6 Chak No. 5
  - Jagir No. 6 Chak No. 6
  - Jagir No. 6 Chak No. 7
  - Jagir No. 6 Chak No. 8
  - Jagir No. 6 Chak No. 9
  - Jagir No. 6 Chak No. 10
  - Jagir No. 6 Chak No. 11
  - Jagir No. 6 Chak No. 12
  - Jagir No. 6 Chak No. 13
  - Jagir No. 6 Chak No. 14
  - Jagir No. 6 Chak No. 15
  - Jagir No. 6 Chak No. 16
  - Jagir No. 6 Chak No. 17
  - Jagir No. 6 Chak No. 18
  - Jagir No. 6 Chak No. 19
  - Jagir No. 6 Chak No. 20
  - Jagir No. 6 Chak No. 21
  - Jagir No. 6 Chak No. 22
  - Jagir No. 6 Chak No. 23
  - Jagir No. 6 Chak No. 24
  - Jagir No. 6 Chak No. 25
  - Jagir No. 6 Chak No. 26
  - Jagir No. 6 Chak No. 27
  - Jagir No. 6 Chak No. 28
  - Jagir No. 6 Chak No. 29
  - Jagir No. 6 Chak No. 30
  - Jagir No. 6 Chak No. 31
  - Jagir No. 6 Chak No. 32
  - Jagir No. 6 Chak No. 33
  - Jagir No. 6 Chak No. 34
  - Jagir No. 6 Chak No. 35
  - Jagir No. 6 Chak No. 36
  - Jagir No. 6 Chak No. 37
  - Jian Abro
  - Juneja
  - Kalar
  - Kamal Khan
  - Kanwar
  - Kario Murad Ali
  - Karohar
  - Khabiriro
  - Khahi Meehoon
  - Khairpur Jusso
  - Kohistan
  - Koor Hassan
  - Koor Kamal
  - Koor Suleman
  - Lakha
  - Lakhtiya
  - Lashkari Chandio
  - Mahyoon
  - Mena
  - Mohabat Buledi
  - Nangar Hakro
  - Nathar
  - Nouzman
  - Pakho
  - Panhwaro
  - Peroz Bhatti
  - Potho Ibrahim
  - Puna
  - Qambar
  - Ranwati
  - Rato Kot
  - Sharifani
  - Wadha
  - Wakro
  - Waryaso
- Warah Tehsil (42 Dehs)
  - Chak Abad
  - Warah
  - Gaji khuhawr
- Miro Khan Tehsil (38 Dehs)
  - Ali Sher Gopang
  - Allah Bad
  - Allah bux wadho
  - Allah Rakhio
  - Behram Hethyoon
  - Behram Mathyon
  - Bharmi
  - Buthi
  - Cheelo
  - Chhajri
  - Chori
  - Chutto joyo
  - Dhori Mubarak
  - Dhori pir bux
  - Dingri
  - Drib Chandio
  - Golo Khuhawar
  - Jalal
  - Kalhora
  - Kallar daro Muqam
  - Karam Ali Gopang
  - Karera
  - Kario Jam
  - Khudi
  - Koor Ali Khan
  - Koor Ibrahim
  - Koor Ismail
  - Koor Muhbbat
  - Mahmoon
  - Misri Khan Chandio
  - Pholro
  - Qaim Gopang
  - Rap
  - Shah Ali Tunio
  - Thareri Dhap
  - Tharo Wadho
  - Thull
  - Vee
- Nasirabad Tehsil (23 Dehs)
  - Adi Dhamrah
  - Adi Lashari
  - Ali Bahar
  - Buth
  - Buth dera
  - Chinjni
  - Chodero
  - Dera
  - Dhamrah
  - Fekhrato
  - Guko
  - Gul Sangar
  - Jalbani
  - Kathia Bazar
  - Khadhari
  - Laiquepur
  - Lakha
  - Mangio
  - Muradi
  - Nasirabad
  - Thariri Hashim
  - Wahucha
  - Wasu Kalhoro
- Qubo Saeed Khan Tehsil (38 Union councils)
  - Bagodaro
  - Bellati
  - Dhoori
  - Dur Mohammad
  - Gada
  - Hakra
  - Hazarwah
  - Imam Bux
  - Ishaque
  - Jagir
  - Jamali
  - Kamil
  - Khokhar
  - Khuhawar
  - Kohistan
  - Kot Shahbag
  - Machi
  - Mast Ali
  - Mohammad Hassan
  - Mugheri
  - Pat No. 1
  - Pat No. 2
  - Pathuja
  - Phalai
  - Pir bux
  - Qubo Saeed Khan
  - Sadique
  - Samander
  - Sarhad
  - Seer Chandia
  - Seer dakhan
  - Seer Jamali
  - Seer Magsi
  - Seer Settlement
  - Shah Waryaso
  - Trangra
  - Waryal
  - Zar
- Shahdadkot Tehsil (39 Dehs)
  - Bhatti
  - Bhurgeri
  - Bhutta
  - Chandia
  - Choudha
  - Dakhan
  - Dhing
  - Gahanwar
  - Gopang
  - Gurgaj
  - Hameer
  - Idden Jarwar
  - Jari
  - Jatoi
  - Jhurir
  - Juneja
  - Kalar
  - Kalhora, Shahdadkot, Qambar Shahdadkot
  - Kario Ahmed Khan
  - Kario Sobdar
  - Khosa
  - Koor Kari
  - Kot Karira
  - Kot Nabi Bux
  - Leghari
  - Magsi
  - Markhand
  - Meena
  - Miro Khan
  - Noor Pur
  - Pathan
  - Qutria
  - Sando
  - Sanjar Bhatti
  - Seelra
  - Shahdadkot
  - Shaho Kamali
  - Siyal
  - Sukkur Jarwar
- Sijawal Junejo Tehsil (32 Dehs)
  - Aalam Khan Junejo
  - Arzi Bhutto
  - Bakhsho Sario
  - Belharo
  - Chakar Suleman
  - Chango
  - Dhingano Mahesar
  - Fateh Khan Dhamraho
  - Fatuhal Chodo
  - Ghulam Muhammad Leghari
  - Gul Kalhoro
  - Gul Shah
  - Hayat Gopang
  - Hyder Chandio
  - Hyder Detho
  - Jaleel Kalhoro
  - Jiand Laak
  - Kallar
  - Kandi
  - Kario Wah
  - Khaliq Dino Dakhan
  - Koor Sahab
  - Korai
  - Lal Khan Mastoi
  - Lashkar Khan Chandio
  - Mastoi
  - Mohammad Gujrani
  - Mohammadi Tanwari
  - Saeed Khan Junejo
  - Sher Khan
  - Sijawal
  - Soonharo Bhatto

== Bibliography ==
- 1998 District census report of Larkana. Census publication. Vol. 30. Islamabad: Population Census Organization, Statistics Division, Government of Pakistan. 1999.
