= Larkana District =

District of Sindh, Pakistan

Larkana District لاڙڪانو ضلعو ضلع لاڑکانہ
- District of Sindh
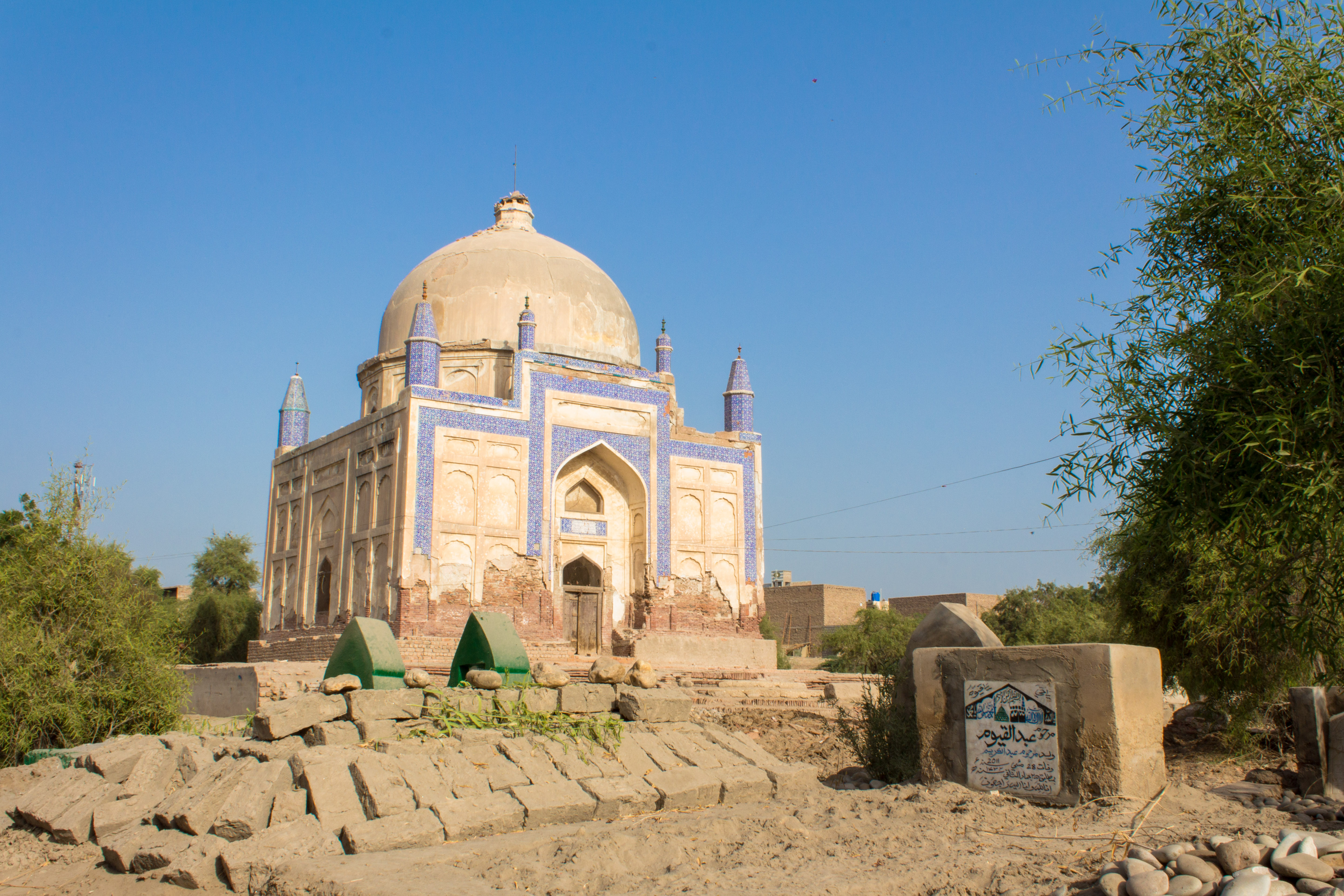
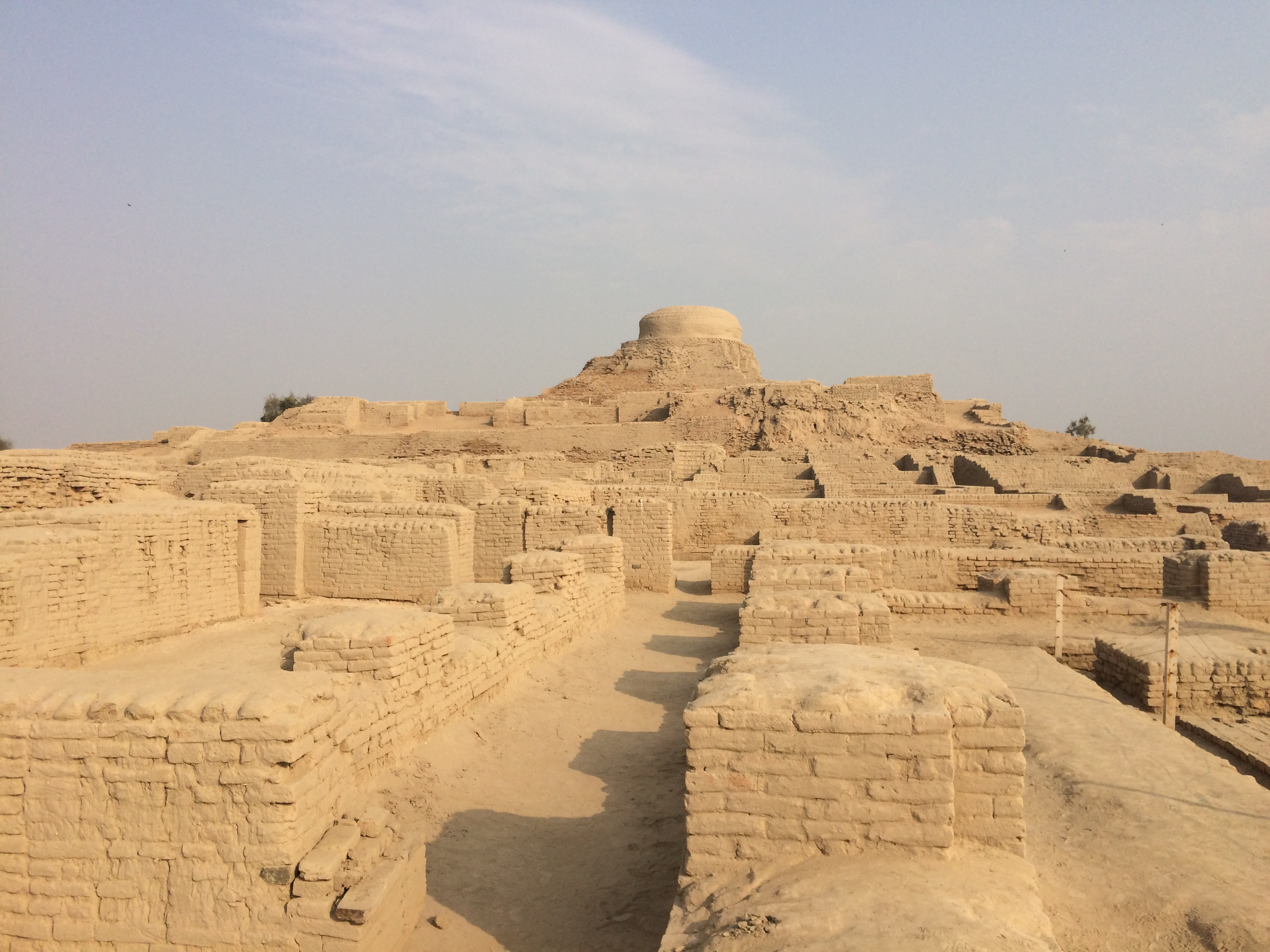
- Top: Tomb of Shah Baharo; Bottom: Ruins of Mohenjo-daro
- Interactive map of Larkana District
- Coordinates: 27°33′36″N 68°13′35″E
- Country: Pakistan
- Province: Sindh
- Division: Larkana
- Established: 1 August 1901
- Founder: British Government
- Headquarters: Larkana

Government
  - Type: District Administration
  - Deputy Commissioner: Dr Sharjeel Noor Channa
  - District Police Officer: SSP Chaudhry Faisal Ahmed
  - District Health Officer: N/A

Area
  - District of Sindh: 1,948 km^{2} (752 sq mi)

Population (2023)
  - District of Sindh: 1,784,453
  - Density: 916.0/km^{2} (2,373/sq mi)
  - Urban: 798,151 (44.73%)
  - Rural: 986,302 (55.27%)

Literacy
  - Literacy rate: Total: 55.58%; Male: 65.34%; Female: 44.96%
- Time zone: UTC+5 (PKT)
- Languages: Sindhi
- Number of Tehsils: 04
- Website: www.larkana.gov.pk

Larkana District (Sindhi: لاڙڪانو ضلعو; Urdu: ضلع لاڑکانہ) is a district of the Sindh province of Pakistan. Its largest city is Larkana, which sits on the banks of the Indus River.

Other towns in the district include Ratodero, Dokri, Bakrani, and Naodero. In 2005, the Government of Pakistan under Pervez Musharraf bifurcated the district, forming a new district called Qamber and Shahdadkot, with the two towns of Qambar Khan and Shahdadkot.

== History ==
The District came into existence on 1 August 1901, when it was formed out of the Karachi and the Shikarpur districts. The Sehwan, Johi, and Dadu talukas were taken from the Karachi district, and the Mehar, Kakar, Warah, Larkana, Labdarya, Kambar and Ratodero talukas were taken from the Shikarpur District, which since has been known as the Sukkur District. Three divisions were formed, the Sehwan division comprising the Sehwan, Johi and Dadh talukas, the Mehar division comprising the Mehar Tehsil, Kakar and Warah talukas, and the Larkana division comprising Larkana, Labdarya, Kambar, and Ratodero talukas.

By 1911, it had been recognized that the Larkana Division was too heavy a charge for one officer, even with the assistance of an attached Deputy Collector, and a new division known as the Ratodero Division was created out of it. Twenty-two dehs from Ratodero, four from Larkana, and forty-four from Kambar were combined to form a new taluka in the northwestern extremity of the District, with headquarters at the village of Miro Khan. The limits of the new taluka were similar to those of the old Sujawal taluka of the Shikarpur District which was abolished around 1883. This new taluka and the reduced Ratodero taluka were combined to form the new division. A minor feature of the change was the transfer of the ten western dehs of Larkana Tehsil to Kambar. Ratodero Tehsil has since been absorbed into Larkana and Mehar subdivisions. Each of the four divisions is in charge of an Assistant Collector or Deputy Collector.

In 1931, Larkana District was split, and the new Dadu District was created.

== Administration ==
The district of Larkana is administratively subdivided into the following tehsil:

Tehsil	Area (km^{2})	Pop. (2023)	Density (ppl/km^{2}) (2023)	Literacy rate (2023)
Bakrani Tehsil	425	275,268	647.69	46.38%
Dokri Tehsil (Labdarya Tehsil)	412	257,394	624.74	49.19%
Larkana Tehsil	549	873,868	1,591.74	58.76%
Ratodero Tehsil	562	377,923	672.46	58.93%

Around 10 km away from Larkana City, sugarcane is cultivated and processed at the Larkana Sugar Mills (Pvt) Ltd. plant, which was inaugurated by former Prime Minister Zulfikar Ali Bhutto on 30 January 1974.

Larkana's guava and berries are famous both nationally and internationally, with the annual output of the district standing at thousands of tons. All the villages of Larkana District on the right bank of the Indus River have vast guava orchids spread over thousands of acres, located in Dodai, Mahotta, Naudero, Chooharpur, Agani, Metla, Izzat Ji Wandh, Phulpota and other villages.

== Education ==
The Government Pilot School was built in 1926, being the oldest education institution in the district. Cadet College Larkana was inaugurated by the former Prime Minister of Pakistan Benazir Bhutto in 1994, first planned by her late father Prime Minister Zulfikar Ali Bhutto in 1975. The college is located 24 kilometres (15 mi) away from Larkana, and some 3 kilometres from Mohenjo-daro.

Colleges and universities in Larkana District:

- Govt. Pilot School Larkana
- Govt. Degree College Larkana
- Shaheed Zufiqar Ali Bhutto Institute of Science and Technology Larkana
- Govt. College of Technology Larkana
- Sindh Science College Larkana
- Global Science College Larkana
- Govt. Chandka Medical College Larkana
- Benazir College of Nursing
- QUEST Larkana
- Allama Open University Larkana

== Transport ==
Moenjo Daro Airport is located near Mohenjo-daro, 28 km away to the south of the city of Larkana, and about 5 kilometres away from Dokri. The main airline which serves the airport is Pakistan International Airlines, the country's national flag carrier. The outdated infrastructure of the airport prevents the use of large, advanced aircraft, with Pakistan International Airlines largely using Fokker aeroplanes for flights.

== Demographics ==
Historical population
Year	Pop.	±% p.a.
1998	1,001,608	—
2017	1,521,786	+2.23%
2023	1,784,453	+2.69%

As of the 2023 census, Larkana district has 321,528 households and a population of 1,784,453. The district has a sex ratio of 109.50 males to 100 females and a literacy rate of 55.58%: 65.34% for males and 44.96% for females. 569,447 (31.91% of the surveyed population) are under 10 years of age. 798,151 (44.73%) live in urban areas.

Religions in Larkana district (2023)
Religion	Percent
Islam	98.32%
Hinduism	1.45%
Other or not stated	0.23%

Religion in contemporary Larkana district
Religious group	1941		2017		2023	
Religious group	Pop.	%	Pop.	%	Pop.	%
Islam	191,621	76.34%	1,498,148	98.45%	1,754,523	98.32%
Hinduism	58,052	23.13%	22,116	1.45%	25,794	1.45%
Sikhism	1,283	0.51%	—N/a	—N/a	38	0%
Others (Note: Including Jainism, Christianity, Buddhism, Zoroastrianism, Judaism, Ad-Dharmis, or not stated)	61	0.02%	1,522	0.10%	4,098	0.23%
Total Population	251,017	100%	1,521,786	100%	1,784,453	100%
Note: 1941 census data is Larkana, Labdarya and Ratodero talukas of Larkana District, which roughly corresponds to contemporary Larkana district. District and taluk borders have changed since 1961.

At the time of the 2023 census, 98.94% of the population spoke Sindhi as their first language.

== Sport ==
The Larkana Bulls cricket team was established in 2013.

Larkana Cricket Stadium, alternatively called the Shaheed Mohtarama Benazir Bhutto International Cricket Stadium, was built by the Pakistan Cricket Board in Garhi Khuda Bakhsh near the tomb of Benazir Bhutto.

== Notable people ==
- Bhutto family:
  - Zulfikar Ali Bhutto - 9th Prime Minister of Pakistan
  - Benazir Bhutto - 11th and 13th Prime Minister of Pakistan
  - Mumtaz Ali Bhutto - 13th Chief Minister of Sindh
- Abida Parveen - Sufi singer
- Sohai Ali Abro - Actress, dancer and model

== See also ==
- Divisions of Pakistan
  - Divisions of Balochistan
  - Divisions of Khyber Pakhtunkhwa
  - Divisions of Punjab
  - Divisions of Sindh
  - Divisions of Azad Kashmir
  - Divisions of Gilgit-Baltistan
- Tehsils of Pakistan
  - Tehsils of Punjab, Pakistan
  - Tehsils of Khyber Pakhtunkhwa, Pakistan
  - Tehsils of Balochistan, Pakistan
  - Tehsils of Sindh, Pakistan
  - Tehsils of Azad Kashmir
  - Tehsils of Gilgit-Baltistan
- Districts of Pakistan
  - Districts of Khyber Pakhtunkhwa, Pakistan
  - Districts of Punjab, Pakistan
  - Districts of Balochistan, Pakistan
  - Districts of Sindh, Pakistan
  - Districts of Azad Kashmir
  - Districts of Gilgit-Baltistan
- ZA Bhutto Agricultural College
- 2014 Larkana temple attack
