= N-655 National Highway =

Road in Pakistan

National Highway 655
- قومی شاہراہ ٦٥٥
- قومی شاہراہ ۶۵۵

Route information
- Maintained by National Highway Authority
- Length: 18 km (11 mi)

Major junctions
- From: Ratodero
- To: Naudero

Location
- Country: Pakistan

Highway system
- Roads in Pakistan

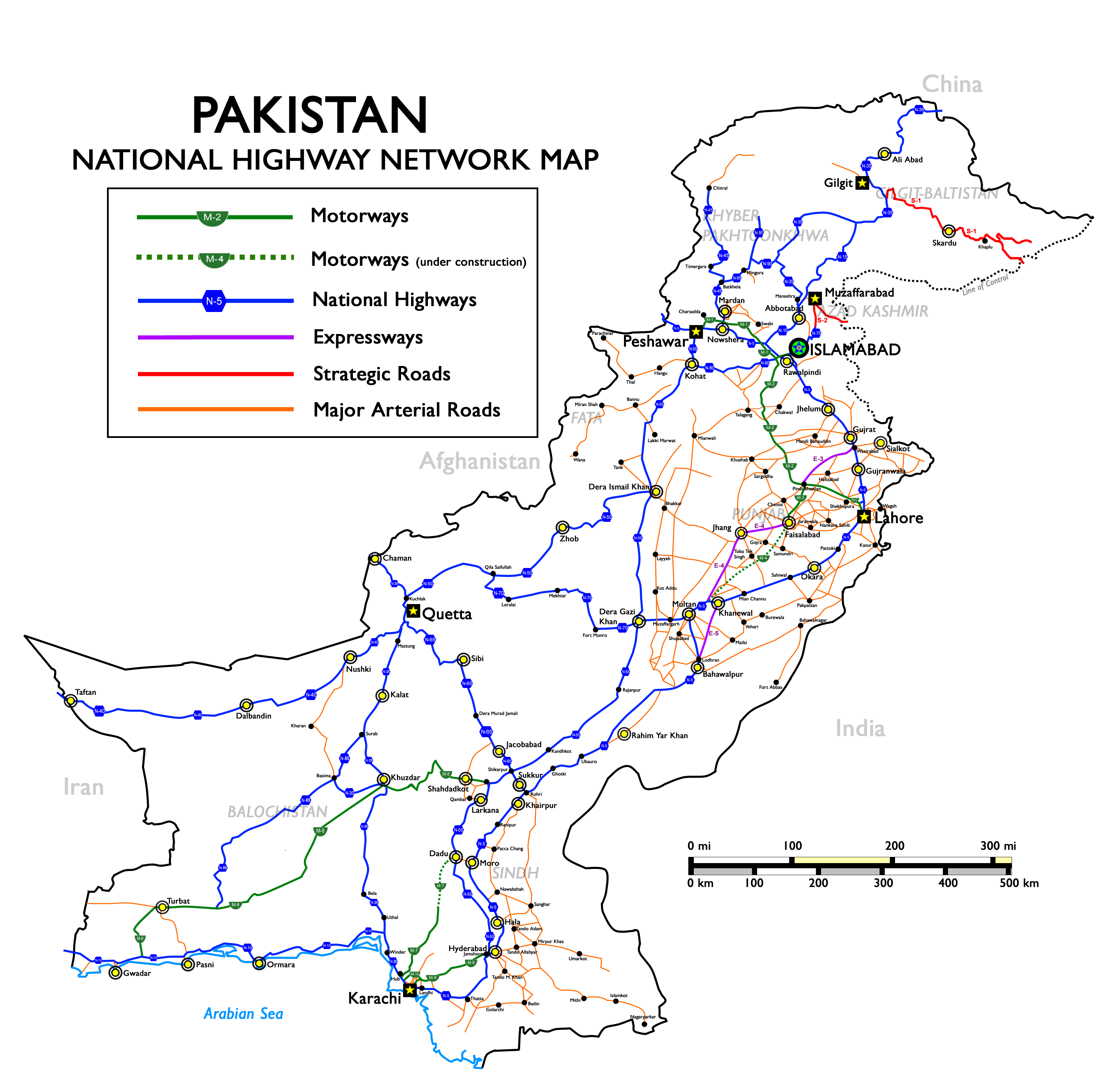
Map of National Highways of Pakistan

The N-655 or National Highway 655 (Urdu: قومی شاہراہ ۶۵۵) is a national highway in Pakistan which extends from Ratodero to Naudero in Sindh province. Its total length is 18 km and is maintained by the National Highway Authority.
