= Indus Highway =

Road in Pakistan

National Highway 55
- قومی شاہراہ ٥٥
- Indus Highway قومی شاہراہ ۵۵

Route information
- Auxiliary route of N-5
- Maintained by National Highway Authority
- Length: 1,264 km (785 mi)
- Existed: 1980–present

Major junctions
- South end: Kotri
- N-5; N-65; N-70; N-50; N-80
- North end: Peshawar

Location
- Country: Pakistan

Highway system
- Roads in Pakistan

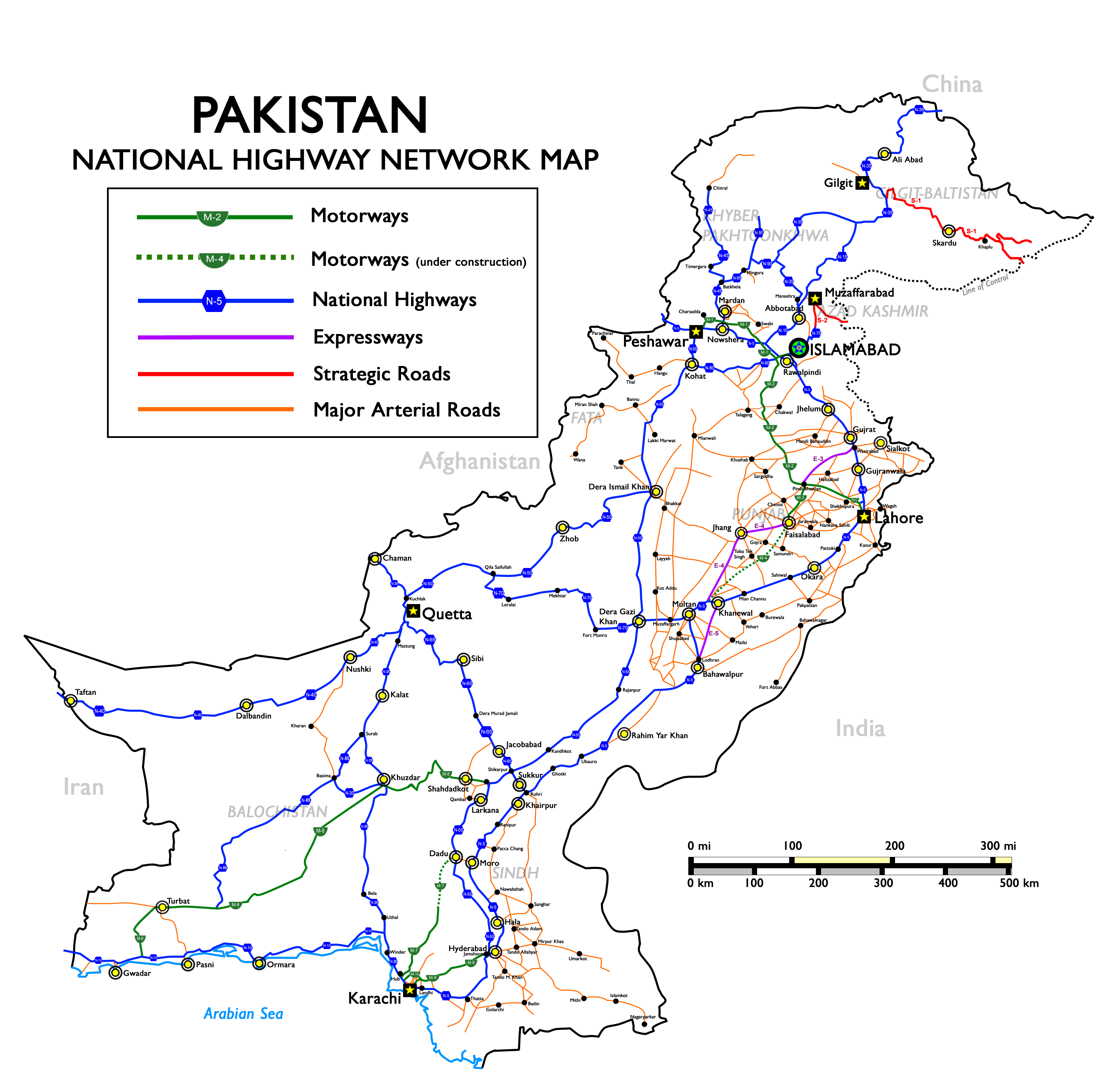
Map of National Highways of Pakistan also indicating N55

The Indus Highway (Urdu: شاہراہ سندھ), also known as National Highway 55 (N-55) (Urdu: قومی شاہراہ ۵۵), is a 1264 km long two to four-lane national highway that runs along the Indus River in Pakistan, connecting the port city of Karachi with the northwestern city of Peshawar via Dera Ghazi Khan. It is part of Pakistan's national highways network and is maintained and operated by National Highway Authority (NHA). The Indus Highway passes through the Kohat Tunnel.

== History ==
In 1980, the Indus Highway was proposed to provide an alternative and shorter route to the heavily used N-5 and to also aid the development of western Sindh province and eastern Khyber Pakhtunkhwa province. Construction began in 1981 from Kotri and was completed in 1997 in Peshawar. Major cities it links include

- Peshawar
- Darra Adam Khel
- Kohat
- Karak
- Lakki Marwat
- Dera Ismail Khan
- Taunsa Sharif
- Dera Ghazi Khan
- Rajanpur
- Rojhan Mazari
- Kashmore
- Kandhkot
- Shikarpur, Sindh
- Larkana
- Dadu, Pakistan
- Jamshoro
- Kotri
- Hyderabad

The Government of Pakistan have planned that a portion of about 300 km will be dualized by the year 2023 starting from Dera Ghazi Khan towards Kotri. Executive Committee of the National Economic Council approved a summary regarding the construction of an additional two lanes and widening/rehabilitation of the existing two-lane carriageway of the Shikarpur-Rajanpur section of Indus Highway N-55, to be executed by the National Highway Authority (NHA). The project would be sponsored by the Ministry of Communications and Asian Development Bank with a total cost of Rs44.7 billion (GoP: Rs4,470.390; ADB: Rs40,233.50).

https://profit.pakistantoday.com.pk/2021/03/11/ecnec-approves-12-projects-worth-rs267-billion/

== See also ==
- Motorways of Pakistan
- Transport in Pakistan
