= National highways of Pakistan =

National Highways of Pakistan Urdu: پاکستان کی قومی شاہراہ

System information
- Maintained by National Highway Authority
- Formed: 1988

Highway names

System links
- Roads in Pakistan

National Highways of Pakistan (Urdu: پاکستان کی قومی شاہراہ) are a network of toll highways in Pakistan, which are owned, maintained and operated by the National Highway Authority under the Ministry of Communications. It maintains 12,131 kilometres (7,538 mi) of roadways organized into various classifications which crisscross the country and provide access to major population centers. National Highways are not to be confused with provincial highways, which are roads maintained by the respective provinces. Pakistan's national highways include the famous Grand Trunk Road, Indus Highway, Karakoram Highway and Makran Coastal Highway.

All national highways in Pakistan are pre-fixed with the letter 'N' (for "national") followed by the unique numerical designation of the specific highway (with a hyphen in the middle), e.g. "N-5". Each numerical designation is separated by five numerals, i.e. N-5, N-10, N-15, etc. National Highways are distinct from Strategic Highways, which begin with the prefix 'S' and are controlled and operated by the Ministry of Defence.

National Highway Network Map

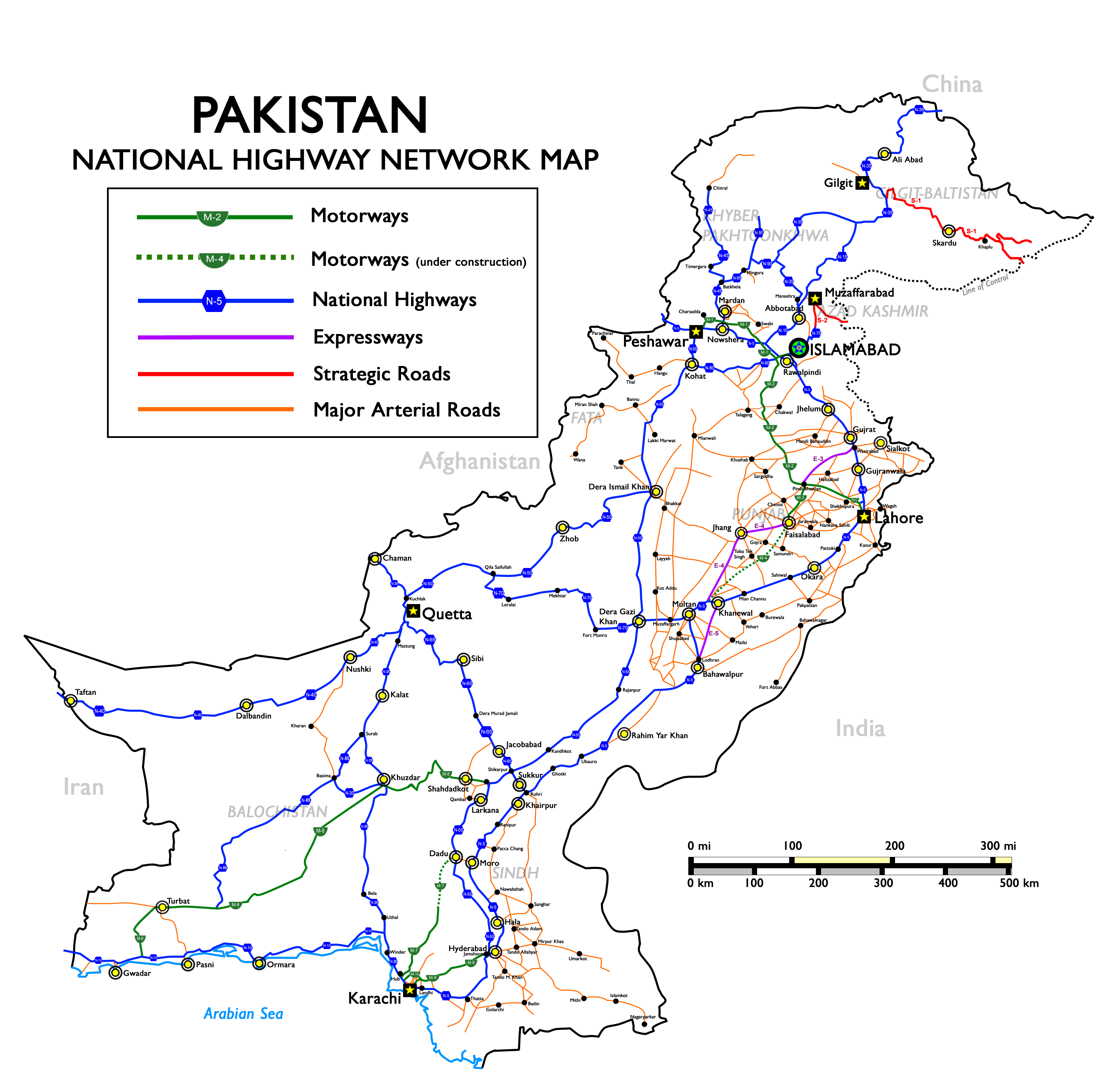
Map of Motorways of Pakistan

== List of national highways ==
Sign	Course	Length (km)	Lanes	Completion year	Status	Remarks
	Karachi – Torkham (N-5 National Highway)	1819	4-6	1952	Operational	Longest national highway in Pakistan. Continues as Kabul–Torkham Road in Afghanistan.
	Karachi – Gwadar (N-10 National Highway)	653	2	2003	Operational	Known more popularly as the Makran Coastal Highway.
	Mansehra – Chilas (N-15 National Highway)	240	2	-	Operational	
	Kashmore – Ubauro (N-20 National Highway)	42	2	-	Operational	
	Karachi – Chaman (N-25 National Highway)	813	2	-	Operational	Continues as Kandahar–Spin Boldak Road in Afghanistan.
	Basima – Khuzdar (N-30 National Highway)	110	2	-	Operational	
	Hasan Abdal – Khunjerab Pass (N-35 National Highway)	1300	2	1979	Operational	Known more popularly as the Karakoram Highway; Continues as China National Highway 314 in China.
	Quetta – Taftan (N-40 National Highway)	610	2	-	Operational	Continues as Road 84 in Iran.
	Nowshera – Chitral (N-45 National Highway)	309	2	-	Operational	
	Kuchlak – Dera Ismail Khan (N-50 National Highway)	531	2	-	Operational	
	Kotri – Peshawar (N-55 National Highway)	1264	2-4	-	Operational	Known more popularly as the Indus Highway; Runs along the length of the Indus River, providing relief to the N-5.
	Lahore – Sargodha (N-60 National Highway)	185	2-4-6	-	Operational	
	Quetta – Sukkur (N-65 National Highway)	385	4	-	Operational	
	Qila Saifullah – Multan (N-70 National Highway)	447	2-4	-	Operational	
	Islamabad – Kohala (N-75 National Highway)	138	4	-	Operational	
	Islamabad – Kohat (N-80 National Highway)	146	2	-	Operational	
	Hushab – Surab (N-85 National Highway)	487	2	-	Operational	
	Khwazakhela – Besham (N-90 National Highway)	64	2	-	Operational	
	Chakdara – Kalam (N-95 National Highway)	135	2	-	Operational	
	Larkana – Lakhi (N-105 National Highway)	61	2	-	Operational	
	Gharo – Keti Bunder (N-110 National Highway)	90	2	-	Operational	
	Tranda Muhammad Panah – Jalalpur Pirwala (N-115 National Highway)	66	2	-	Operational	
	Hyderabad – Khokhrapar (N-120 National Highway)	220	2	-	Operational	
	Taxila – Haripur (N-125 National Highway)	44	2	-	Operational	
	Mianwali – Balkasar (N-130 National Highway)	129	2	-	Operation/UC	Takeover by NHA in 2020
	Mianwali – Muzaffarghar (N-135 National Highway)	363	2	-	Operation/UC	Proposed 4 lane. Takeover by NHA in 2020
	Gilgit – Chitral (N-140 National Highway)	363	2	-	Operation/UC	Takeover by NHA in 2020
	Dorah Pass – Chitral (N-145 National Highway)	82.5	2	-	Operation/UC	Takeover by NHA in 2020
	Larkana - Mohenjo Daro (N-155 National Highway)	28	2	-	Operational	
	Larkana - Nasirabad (N-255 National Highway)	34	2	-	Operational	
	Sakrand - Nawabshah (N-305 National Highway)	35	2	-	Operational	
	Larkana - Shahdadkot (N-455 National Highway)	50	2	-	Operational	
	Ratodero - Naudero (N-655 National Highway)	18	2	-	Operational	

== List of provincial highways ==
=== Islamabad Capital Territory ===
- Territorial Highways of Islamabad Capital Territory

=== Gilgit-Baltistan ===
- Provincial Highways of Gilgit-Baltistan

=== Khyber Pakhtunkhwa ===
- Provincial Highways of Khyber Pakhtunkhwa

=== Punjab ===
- Provincial Highways of Punjab

=== Sindh ===
- Provincial Highways of Sindh

== List of strategic highways ==
Name	Course	Length	Lanes	Completion year	Status	Remarks
S-1	Gilgit - Skardu	167 km	2	1982	Operational	
S-2	Kohala - Muzaffarabad	40 km	2	2016	Operational	
S-3	Muzaffarabad - Chakothi	55 km	2	2010	Operational	

== See also ==
- Roads in Pakistan
- National Highway Authority
- Speed limits in Pakistan
- Motorways of Pakistan
