= N-105 National Highway =

Road in Pakistan

National Highway 105
- قومی شاہراہ ١٠٥
- Larkana–Lakhi Highway

Route information
- Length: 61 km (38 mi)

Major junctions
- North end: Lakhi
- South end: Larkana

Location
- Country: Pakistan

Highway system
- Roads in Pakistan

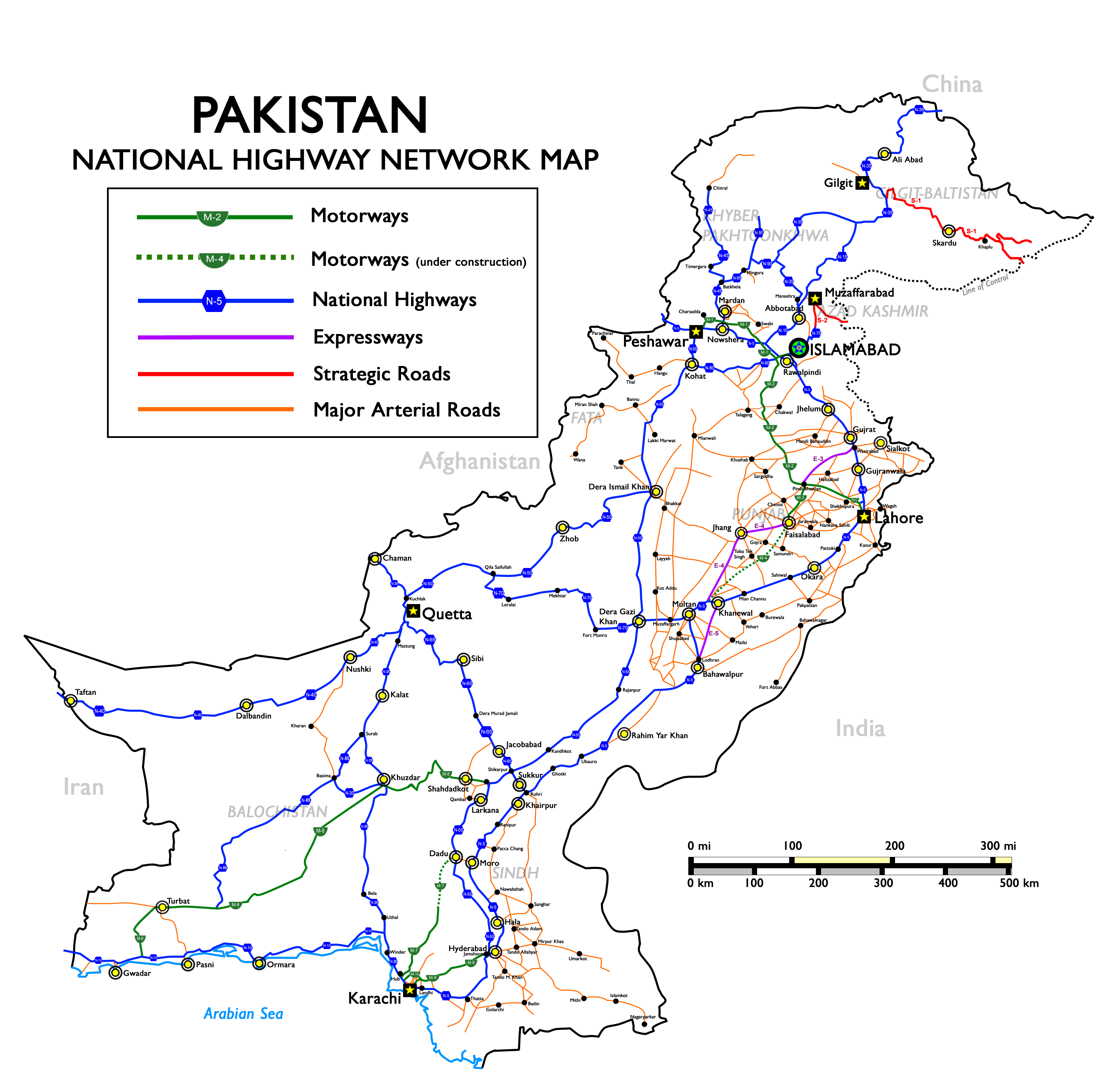
Map of National Highways of Pakistan

The National Highway 105 (Urdu: قومی شاہراہ ۱۰۵) or the N-105 is one of Pakistan National Highway running from Larkana to the town of Lakhi via Naudero in Sindh province of Pakistan. Its total length is 61 km, the highway is maintained and operated by Pakistan's National Highway Authority.
