= Nokundi–Mashkhel–Panjgur Road =

Road in Pakistan

Route information
- Length: 103 km (64 mi)
- Existed: 2021–present

Major junctions
- North end: Nokundi
- N-40 at Nokundi; N-85 at Panjgur; M-8 at Panjgur
- South end: Mashkhel

Location
- Country: Pakistan
- Provinces: Balochistan
- Major cities: Nokundi, Mashkhel, Panjgur

Highway system
- Roads in Pakistan

The Nokundi–Mashkhel–Panjgur Road is an infrastructure project under the China-Pakistan Economic Corridor (CPEC). The road is designed to improve connectivity in the region, particularly between Pakistan and Iran.

The projected cost is 7 billion Rupees. An additional allocation of 2.5 billion Rupees has been put forward for this project in the Public Sector Development Programme (PSDP) for the fiscal year 2023-24.

== Overview ==
The Nokundi–Mashkhel–Panjgur Road project involves building a 103-kilometer road connecting Nokundi to Mashkhel, and a detailed design for a 200-kilometer road from Mashkhel to Panjgur is currently in progress. The project's objective is to establish a connection between the N-40, N-85, and M-8 (Western Route of CPEC), creating a link between the Chagai-Nokundi Sector and Gwadar. This will provide access to the entire isolated region of Balochistan.

The former Prime Minister Imran Khan inaugurated the project on May 20, 2021. The tendering process for the construction work has been finished, and the contractor is now actively engaged. By January 2022, significant progress was evident on several road projects along the CPEC Western Route, including the Nokundi–Mashkhel–Panjgur Road. The projects are on track for completion within the next three years.

== Impact ==
The development of the Nokundi–Mashkhel–Panjgur Road is anticipated to bring about a substantial enhancement in regional connectivity. This road project is set to not only enhance the link to Iran but also invigorate economic endeavors in Gwadar, which is evolving into a pivotal center within the ambitious CPEC project. Enhancing road infrastructure in South Balochistan stands as a paramount goal for the government in order to strengthen the connection between Gwadar and the northern regions.

== See also ==
- Dera Ismail Khan–Zhob motorway
- Roads in Pakistan
