= Fort Munro Steel Bridge =

Bridge in Pakistan

Fort Munro Steel Bridge فورٹ منرو فولادی پل
- Coordinates: 29°57′24.72″N 70°0′36.74″E
- Locale: Fort Munro, Pakistan
- Other name(s): Raakhi Gaaj Project

Characteristics
- Material: Steel
- Total length: 1.5 km
- Height: 150ft

History
- Engineering design by: Modern method
- Construction cost: Rs. 13.75 billion

Fort Munro Steel Bridge (Ur:فورٹ منرو فولادی پل) also known as Rakhi Gaaj Project is a road bridge, located in the Punjab region of Pakistan, on the route to Fort Munro. It is the 2nd largest steel bridge in Asia. It was engineered in collaboration with Japan, Japan International Cooperation Agency (JICA). Steel Bridge is the part of 32 kilometre portion of N-70 starting from Bahawalpur Chowk in Multan to Kila Saifullah in Balochistan.

== Construction ==
Eight steel bridges are inter-connected with each other to make a single bridge that is spread over 1.5 kilometres in Rakhi Gaaj. The project made the hilly portion of the road wide for Gwadar-bound cargo traffic with the installation of eight steel bridges, connecting south Punjab to China-Pakistan Economic Corridor via N-70.

== History ==
The project was first announced by National Highway Authority of Pakistan along with Japan International Cooperation Agency in 2016. It was constructed to provide safe and wide road for the cargo trucks and connecting South Punjab to China–Pakistan Economic Corridor. Japanese Prime Minister, Shinzo Abe inaugurated the steel bridge in April 2020.

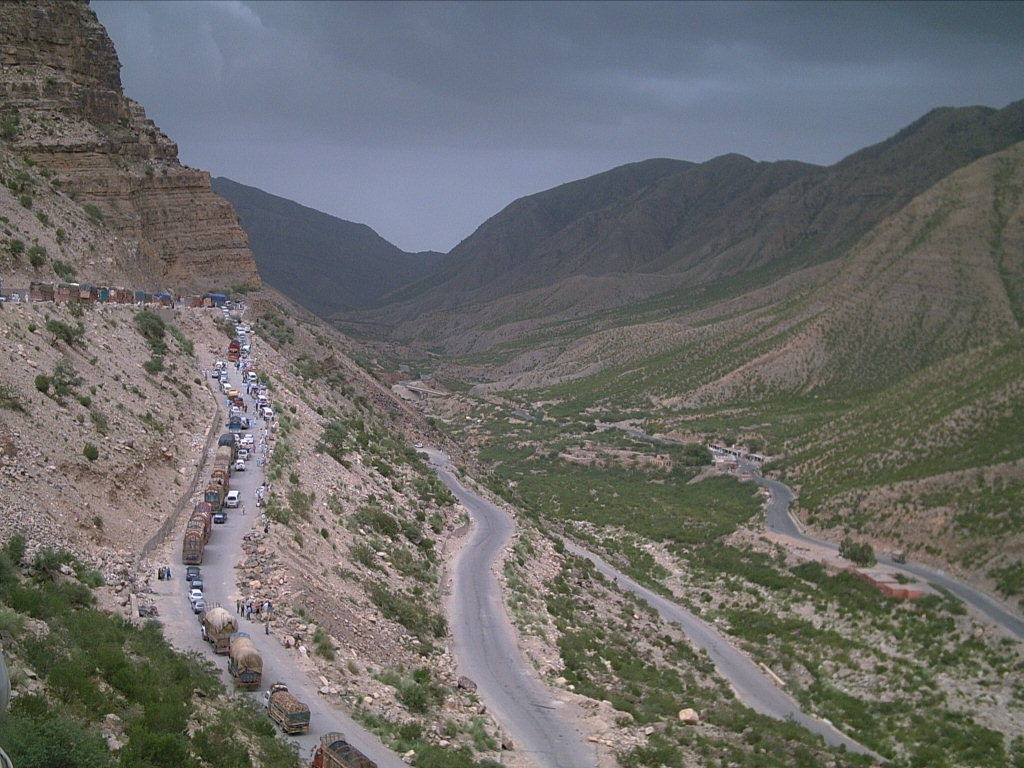
Before development of the project
