= Major roadways of Islamabad Capital Territory =

MAJOR ROADWAYS IN ISLAMABAD(CAPITAL OF PAKISTAN)

The Islamabad Capital Territory has five major types of roadways i.e. expressway(s), highway(s), avenues, khayabans, and roads. The Capital Development Authority's Engineering Wing, under the Ministry of Transportation, maintains over 2,000 kilometres (1,200 mi) of roadways organised into various classifications which crisscross the territory (mainly Islamabad). These are not to be confused with national highways, which are federal roads maintained by the National Highway Authority, Government of Pakistan.

== Plan of avenues and khayabans ==
According to original plan, all avenues are supposed to run north to south; and all khayabans from east to west. However, there have been several violations of this plan. The worst examples are Jinnah Avenue (which should be called Khayaban Quaid-i-Azam); Margalla Avenue (which should be called Khayaban Margalla) and Iran Avenue (which should lie only between E-10 and E-11 and not between D-11 and E-11.

== List of expressway(s) ==
Expressway	Course	Length	Existing	Status	Lanes	Completion
Islamabad Expressway	Zero Point Interchange–Rawat	28 km	28 km	Operational	10	1968

== List of highway(s) ==
Highway	Course	Length	Existing	Status	Lanes	Completion
Srinagar Highway	E-75 (Murree Road Interchange) – M-1/M-2 Motorway (Islamabad Interchange)	25 km	25 km	Operational	10	1973

== List of avenues ==
- 3rd Avenue
- 4th Avenue
- 7th Avenue (Ahmed Nadeem Qasmi Avenue)
- 8th Avenue (Faisal Avenue)
- 9th Avenue (Agha Shahi Avenue)
- 11th Avenue (Iran Avenue)
- Atatürk Avenue
- Constitution Avenue
- Garden Avenue
- Jinnah Avenue
- Margalla Avenue

== List of khayabans ==
- Khayaban-e-Iqbal
- Khayaban-e-Suhrwardy

Note: Khayaban (خیابان) is Persian language equivalent of avenue.

== List of roads ==
- Aga Khan Road
- Alexander Road
- Bhara Kahu Bypass
- Ibn-e-Sina Road
- Murree Road
- Karnal Sher Khan Shaheed Road
- Park Road

== See also ==
- Motorways of Pakistan
- National highways of Pakistan
- Transport in Pakistan
- National Highway Authority
