= N-110 National Highway =

Road in Pakistan

National Highway 110
- قومی شاہراہ ١١٠
- Gharo–Keti Bunder Highway

Route information
- Length: 90 km (56 mi)

Major junctions
- North end: Gharo
- South end: Keti Bunder

Location
- Country: Pakistan

Highway system
- Roads in Pakistan

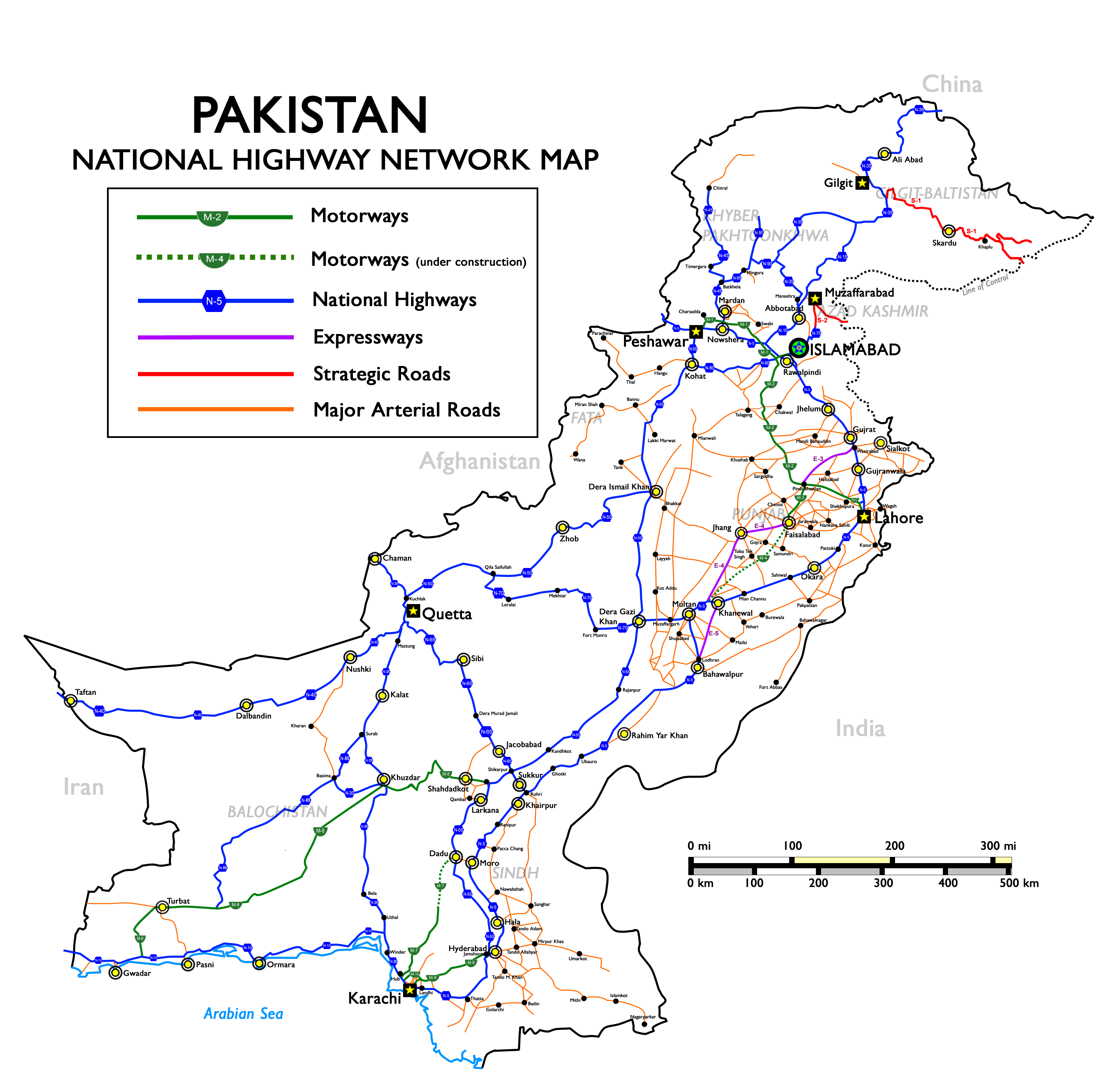
Map of National Highways of Pakistan

The National Highway 110 (Urdu: قومی شاہراہ ۱۱۰) or the N-110 is one of Pakistan National Highway running from Gharo to the town of Keti Bunder in Thatta District in Sindh province of Pakistan. Its total length is 90 km, the highway is maintained and operated by Pakistan's National Highway Authority.
