= N-255 National Highway =

Road in Pakistan

National Highway 255
- قومی شاہراہ ٢٥٥
- Larkana–Nasirabad Highway

Route information
- Length: 34 km (21 mi)

Major junctions
- North end: Larkana
- South end: Nasirabad

Location
- Country: Pakistan

Highway system
- Roads in Pakistan

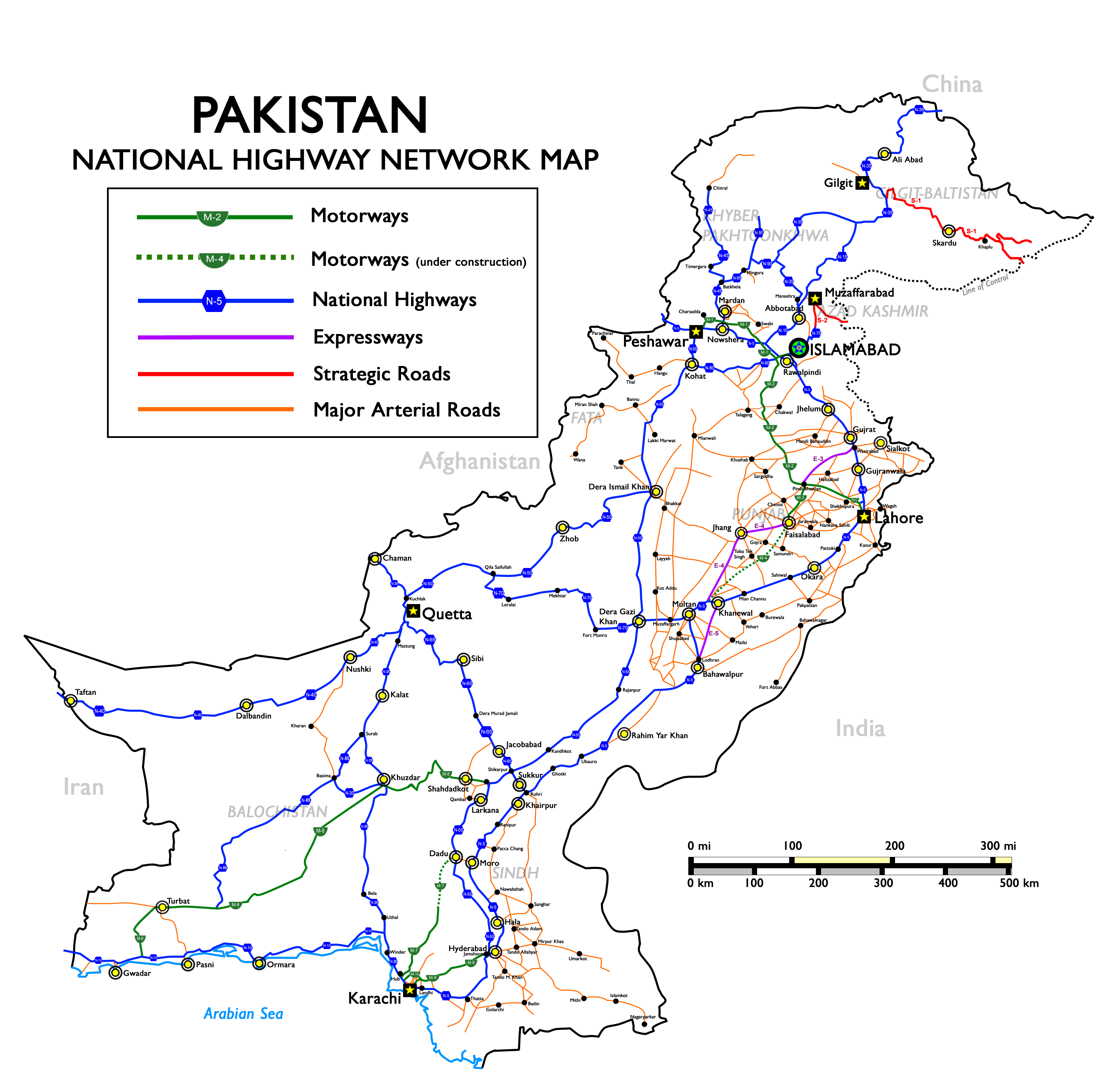
Map of National Highways of Pakistan

The National Highway 255 (Urdu: قومی شاہراہ ۲۵۵) or the N-255 is one of Pakistan National Highway running from Larkana to the town of Nasirabad via Rasheed Wagan in Sindh province of Pakistan. Its total length is 34 km, the highway is maintained and operated by Pakistan's National Highway Authority.
