= N-80 National Highway =

Road in Pakistan

National Highway 80
- قومی شاہراہ ٨٠
- Islamabad–Kohat Highway

Route information
- Maintained by NHA
- Length: 170 km (110 mi)

Major junctions
- East end: Tarnol (Islamabad CT)
- Jand, Attock
- West end: Togh Bala (Kohat District)

Location
- Country: Pakistan

Highway system
- Roads in Pakistan

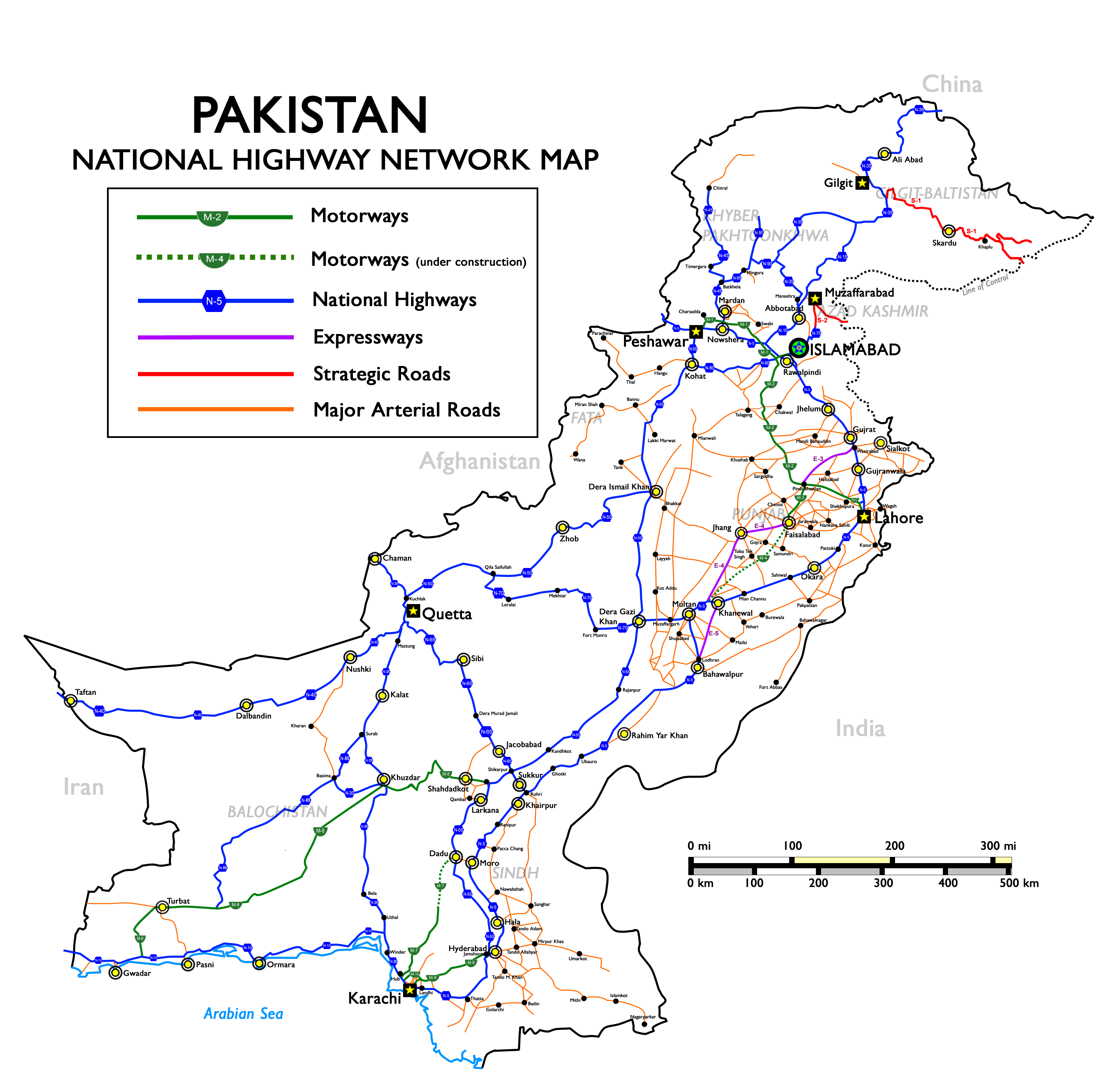
Map of National Highways of Pakistan also indicating N-80

The National Highway 80 (Urdu: قومی شاہراہ ۸۰) or the N-80 is one of Pakistan's National Highways running from Capital city of Islamabad to the city of Kohat in Khyber Pakhtunkhwa province via Fateh Jang and Jand. Its total length is 146 km with a 121 km section in the Punjab province and the remaining 49 km in the Khyber Pakhtunkhwa province. It is maintained and operated by Pakistan's National Highway Authority.
