= Sikander-e-Azam Road =

Roadway project in Islamabad

Route information
- Length: 20 km (12 mi)

Major junctions
- From: Margalla Expressway
- To: Khanpur

Location
- Country: Pakistan

Highway system
- Roads in Pakistan

Sikander-e-Azam Road is a roadway project in Islamabad, Pakistan that is aimed at promoting Gandhara tourism.

== History ==
Prime Minister Shehbaz Sharif inaugurated the construction of Sikander-e-Azam Road, as the Capital Development Authority (CDA) and Government of Khyber Pakhtunkhwa collaborate on this project.

== Route Description ==
The joint road project spanning 20 kilometers, undertaken by the CDA and KP government, is expected to be finished within four months. However, carpeting the road across Margalla Hills is estimated to take approximately six months. The CDA will handle the carpeting of the 7.5-kilometer stretch from Margalla Expressway to village Kainthla via Shah Allah Ditta, while the KP government will be responsible for completing the remaining section of Sikander-e-Azam Road up to Khanpur, Khyber Pakhtunkhwa. Once the road project is completed, it will serve as a shorter route between Islamabad and Haripur District, resulting in fuel and reducing travel time to Khanpur Lake by 30 minutes.

== See also ==
- Bhara Kahu Bypass
- Alexander Road
