= N-120 National Highway =

Road in Pakistan

National Highway 120
- قومی شاہراہ ١٢٠
- Hyderabad – Khokhrapar Highway

Route information
- Length: 220 km (140 mi)

Major junctions
- North end: Khokhrapar; India; NH 25
- South end: Hyderabad

Location
- Country: Pakistan

Highway system
- Roads in Pakistan

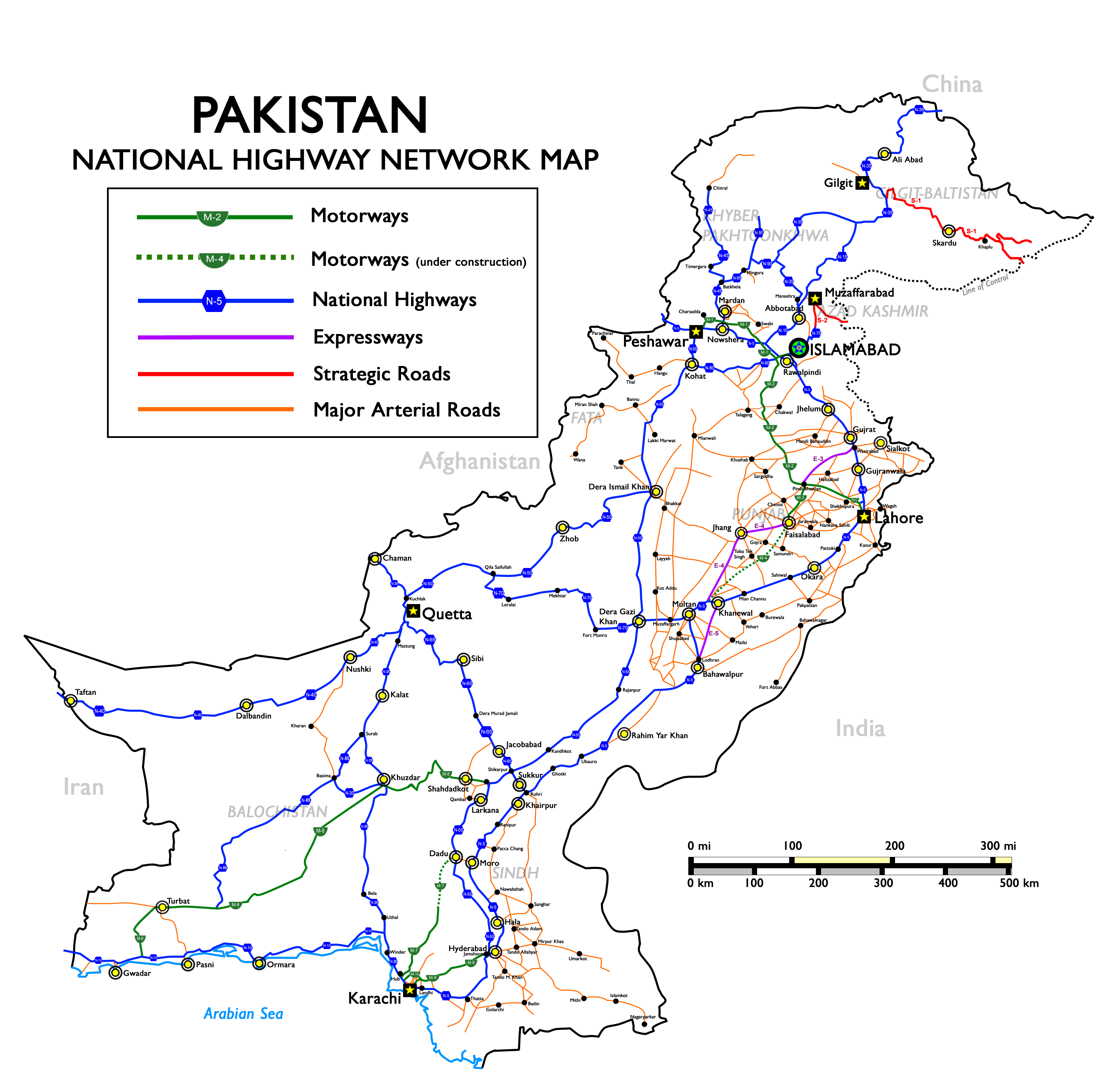
Map of National Highways of Pakistan. N-120 is the arterial road through Umerkot but extends to the border

The National Highway 120 (Urdu: قومی شاہراہ ۱۲۰) or the N-120 is one of Pakistan National Highway running from Hyderabad to the town of Khokhrapar via Mirpur Khas, Umerkot in Sindh province of Pakistan. Its total length is 220 km, the highway is maintained and operated by Pakistan's National Highway Authority.
