= N-455 National Highway =

Road in Pakistan

National Highway 455
- قومی شاہراہ ٤٥٥

Route information
- Maintained by National Highway Authority
- Length: 50 mi (80 km)

Major junctions
- North end: Larkana
- South end: Shahdadkot

Location
- Country: Pakistan

Highway system
- Roads in Pakistan

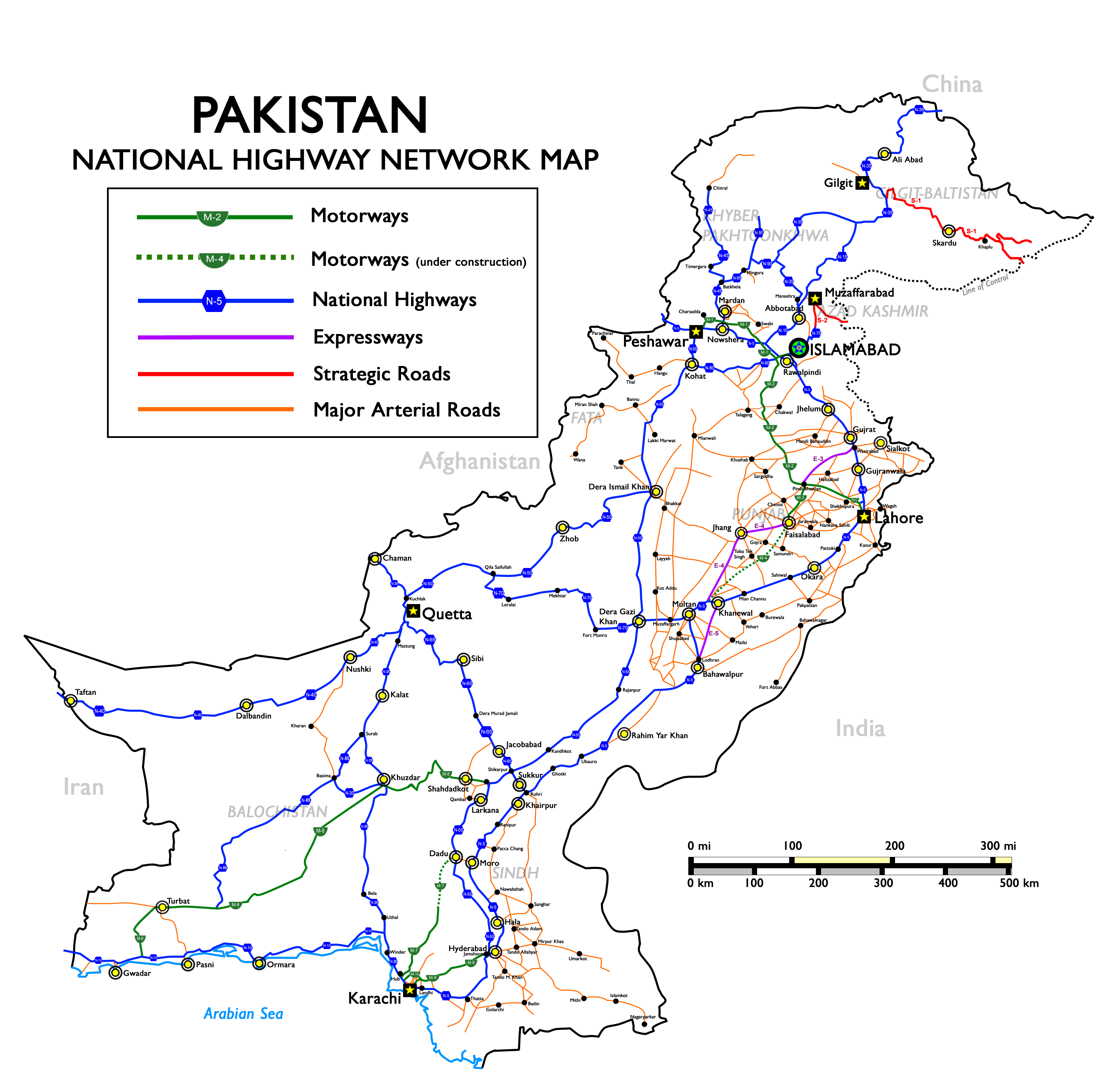
Map of National Highways of Pakistan

The N-455 or National Highway 455 (Urdu: قومی شاہراہ ۴۵۵) is a national highway in Pakistan which extends from Larkana to Shahdadkot in Sindh province. Its total length is 50 km and is maintained by the National Highway Authority.
