= N-125 National Highway =

Road in Pakistan

National Highway 125
- قومی شاہراہ ١٢٥
- Taxila – Haripur Highway

Route information
- Length: 44 km (27 mi)

Major junctions
- North end: Haripur
- South end: Taxila

Location
- Country: Pakistan

Highway system
- Roads in Pakistan

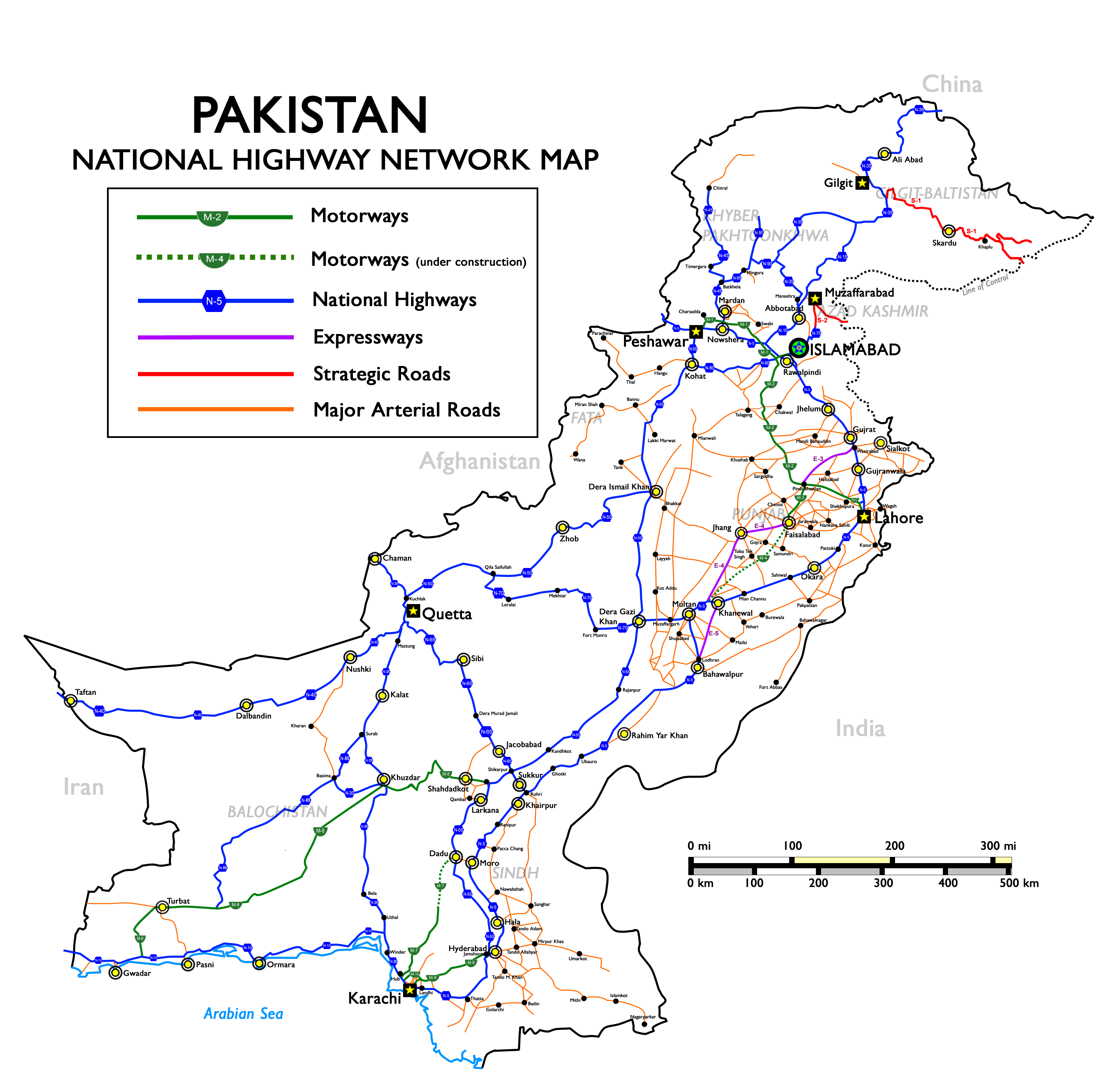
Map of National Highways of Pakistan

The National Highway 125 (Urdu: قومی شاہراہ ۱۲۵) or the N-125 is one of Pakistan National Highway running from Taxila to the town of Haripur via Khanpur in Khyber Pakhtunkhwa province of Pakistan. Its total length is 44 km, the highway is maintained and operated by Pakistan's National Highway Authority.
