= N-155 National Highway =

Road in Pakistan

National Highway 155
- قومی شاہراہ ١٥٥
- Larkana - Moenjo Daro Highway

Route information
- Length: 28 km (17 mi)

Major junctions
- North end: Larkana
- South end: Moenjo Daro

Location
- Country: Pakistan

Highway system
- Roads in Pakistan

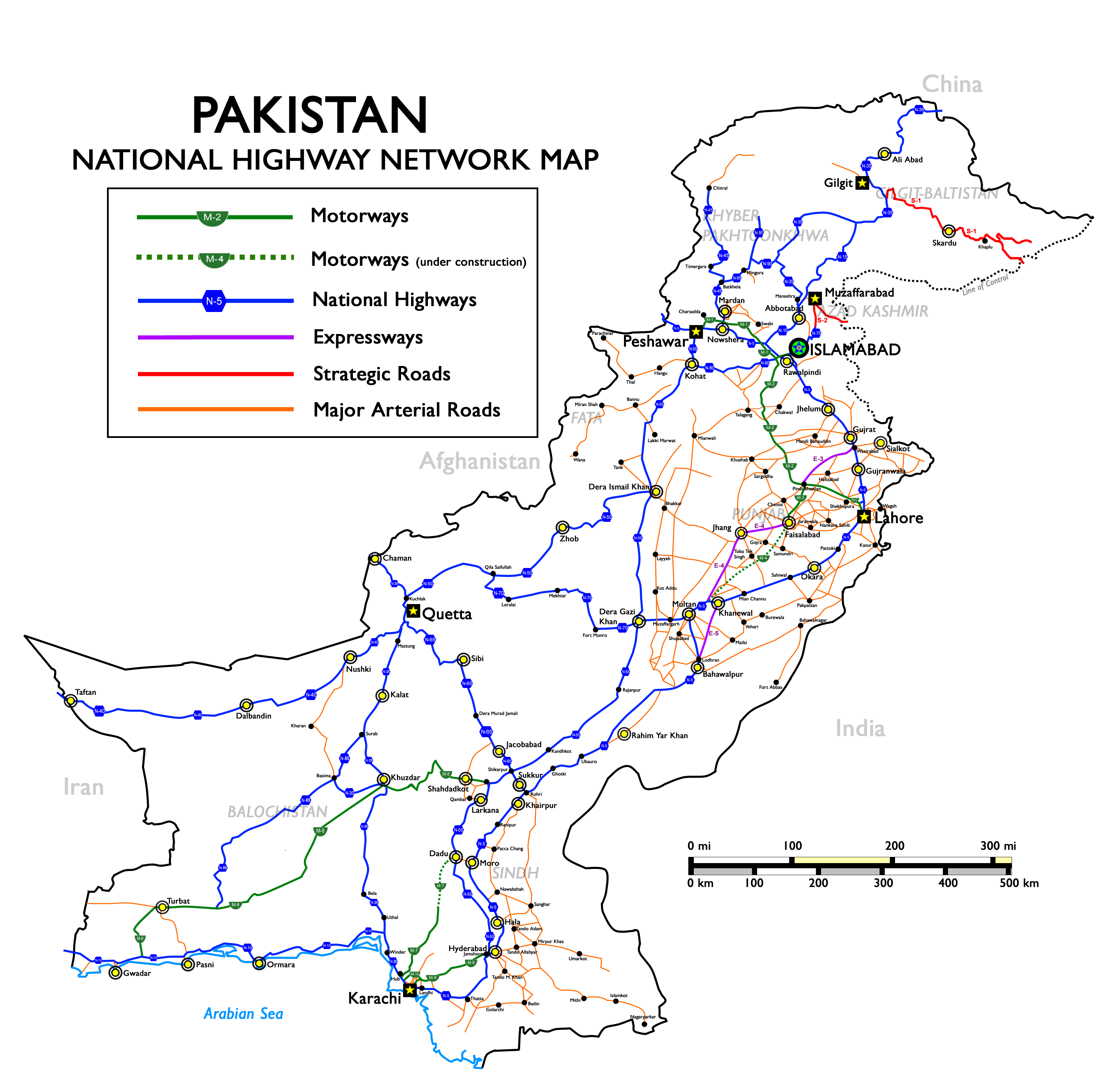
Map of National Highways of Pakistan

The National Highway 155 (Urdu: قومی شاہراہ ۱۵۵) or the N-155 is a part of the Pakistan National Highway running from Larkana to the town of Moenjo Daro in Sindh province of Pakistan. Its total length is 28 km, and is maintained and operated by Pakistan's National Highway Authority.
