= Hajika =

Village in Balochistan, Pakistan

Coordinates: 28°33′N 66°19′E

Hajika is a village situated 190 kilometres (120 mi) south from Quetta in the Surab Tehsil of Surab District in the province of Balochistan, Pakistan. In 2017 the village had 2,793 residents, belonging mainly to the Muhmasani, Mardashahi, Reki mengal and Harooni tribes. Most known personalities: Mohammad Yaqoob mardashai, Abdul Qadir Mengal, Sir Yousuf reki, Taj Mehmood, Shakeel Ahmed and Qameesa Jani.
