= Ghari Qamar Din =

Garhi Qamardin or Garhi Qamar Din, is located in the neighbourhood of Peshawar, Pakistan. This township, previously a village, is located at the juncture of Ring Road, Peshawar and Kohat Road, Peshawar. A flyover was built in 1990s at this juncture, called Garhi Qamardin Flyover, but in Oct,2015 the flyover called Rahman BaBa flyover, today a main part of the major bus routes of Peshawar. The national highway N55 starts at this location downward joining the Indus Highway which go till Karachi, the most southern city of Pakistan.

== Geographical location ==
Garhi Qamardin is located in the south of Peshawar city. It is nearby to the Small Industries Estate (SIE), Peshawar and the Government College of Technology Peshawar. It is located at the juncture of Ring Road, Peshawar and Kohat Road, Peshawar. The Ring Road, Peshawar is one of the important route used for NATO supply, which resulted in increased terror attacks in this area near to this juncture of Ring Road and Kohat Road.
