= N90 =

N90 may refer to:

- N-90 National Highway, in Pakistan
- N90 statistic
- New York TRACON, an air traffic control facility
- Ngandi language
- NGC 602, a star cluster
- Nikon N90, a camera
- Nokia N90, a smartphone
- Toyota Hilux (N90), a pickup truck
- Xiaomi SkyNomad N90, a range-extended electric full-size SUV
