= N-65 National Highway =

Road in Pakistan

National Highway 65
- قومی شاہراہ ٦٥
- Sukkur-Quetta Highway

Route information
- Part of AH2
- Maintained by NHA
- Length: 385 km (239 mi)

Major junctions
- North end: Quetta
- South end: Sukkur

Location
- Country: Pakistan

Highway system
- Roads in Pakistan

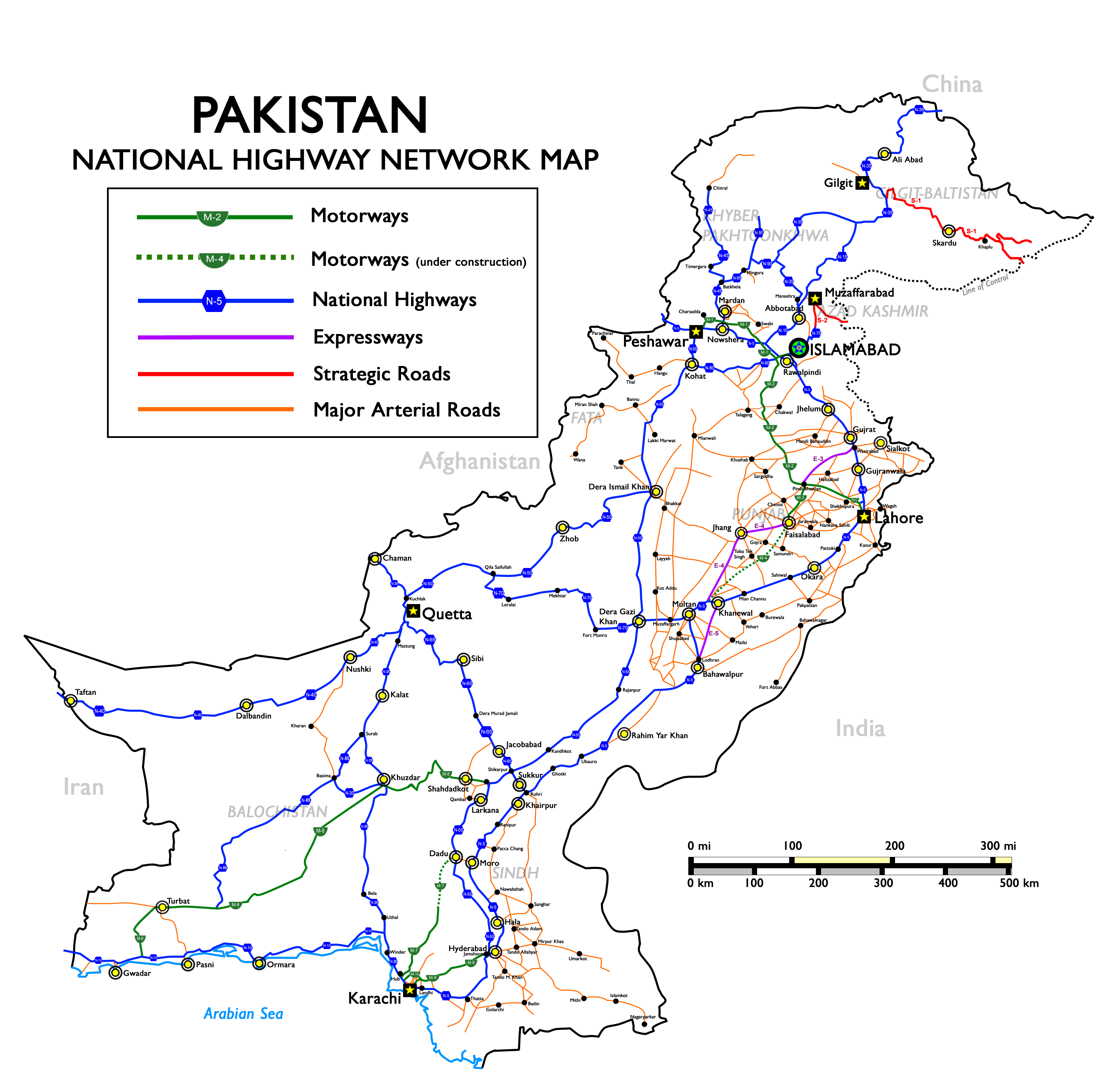
Map of National Highways of Pakistan also indicating N-65

The National Highway 65 (Urdu: قومی شاہراہ ۶۵) or the N-65 is one of Pakistan National Highway running from Sukkur in Sindh to Quetta in Baluchistan, Pakistan via Shikarpur, Jacobabad, Jaffarabad and Nasirabad. It is a two lane highways with total length of 385 km, divided into 295 km in Baluchistan and the remaining 90 km in the Sindh It is maintained and operated by Pakistan's National Highway Authority.

== See also ==
- Motorways of Pakistan
- Transport in Pakistan
