= Speed limits in Pakistan =

Speed limits in Pakistan are set by different levels of government (federal, provincial, and municipal), depending on the jurisdiction under which the road falls, resulting in differences from province to province with the highest speed limit at 120 km/h (75 mph) on motorways. Speed limits are demarcated by regulatory road signs. These consist of white circular signs with a red outline.

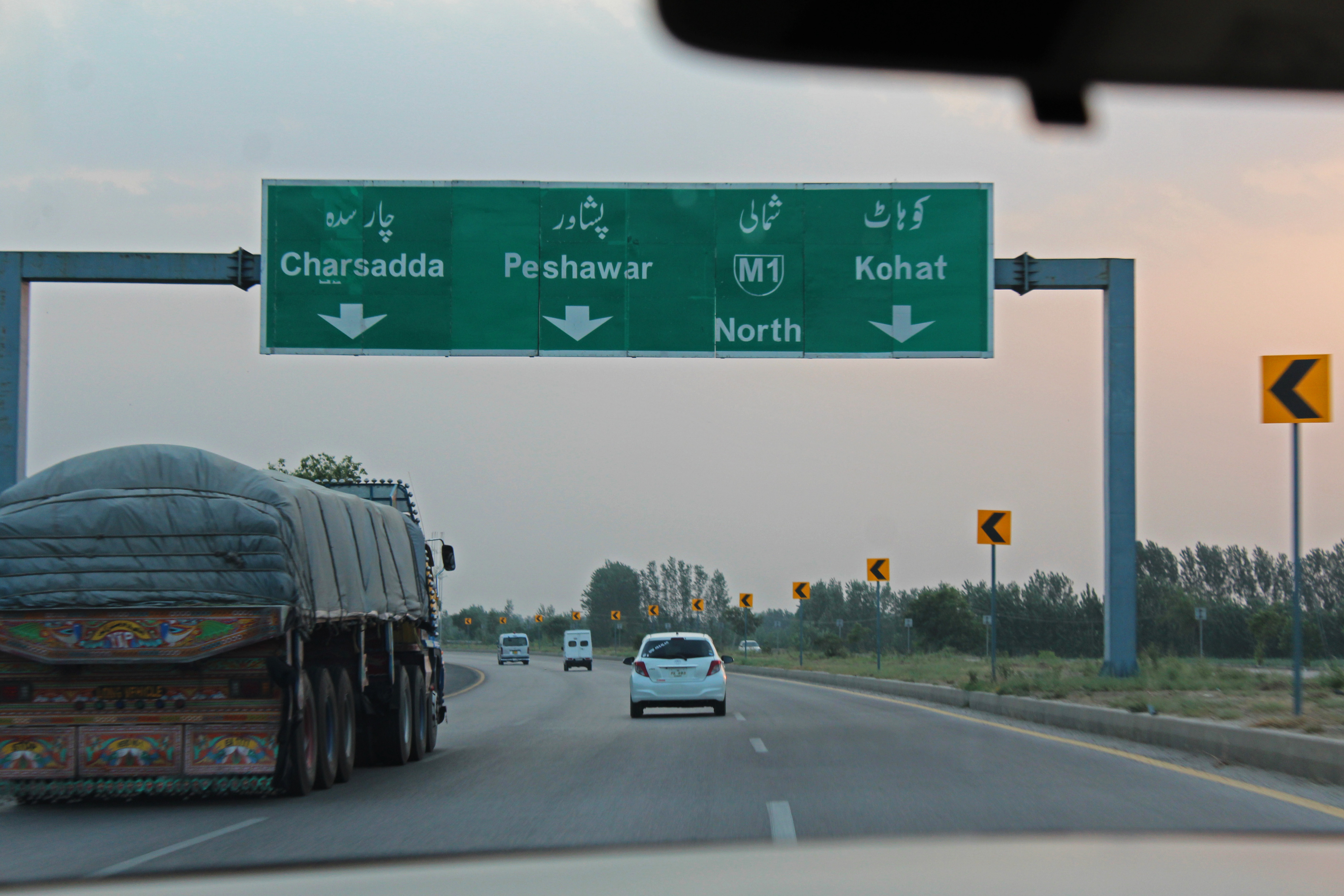
M-1 motorway westbound towards Peshawar.

The general speed limits in Pakistan are as follows:

On motorways, and the motorway M3 (Faisalabad), M-2 and M-1, the speed limit is 120 km/h (75 mph) for light transport vehicles and 110 km/h (68mph) for heavy transport and passenger service vehicles. In most urban residential areas, the speed limit is 40–50 km/h (25–31 mph). The G.T. Road's highest speed limit is 100 kilometres per hour (62 mph). Urban arterial roads generally have an 80 km/h (50 mph) speed limit. However, roads in the western portion of the country, as well as the N-5 in Pakistan has some portions where the enforced speed limit is 130 km/h (81 mph). The road that travels through the Suleiman Range of Balochistan, as well as the roads that are above Kuchlak towards Razmak have no enforced speed limit. The National Highway Authority has set the statutory maximum speed limit on the motorway at 100 km/h.

== See also ==
- Motorways of Pakistan
- Transport in Pakistan
