= N-50 National Highway =

Road in Pakistan

National Highway 50
- قومی شاہراہ ٥٠
- قومی شاہراہ ۵۰

Route information
- Maintained by NHA
- Length: 531 km (330 mi)

Major junctions
- East end: D.I.Khan
- West end: Kuchlak

Location
- Country: Pakistan

Highway system
- Roads in Pakistan

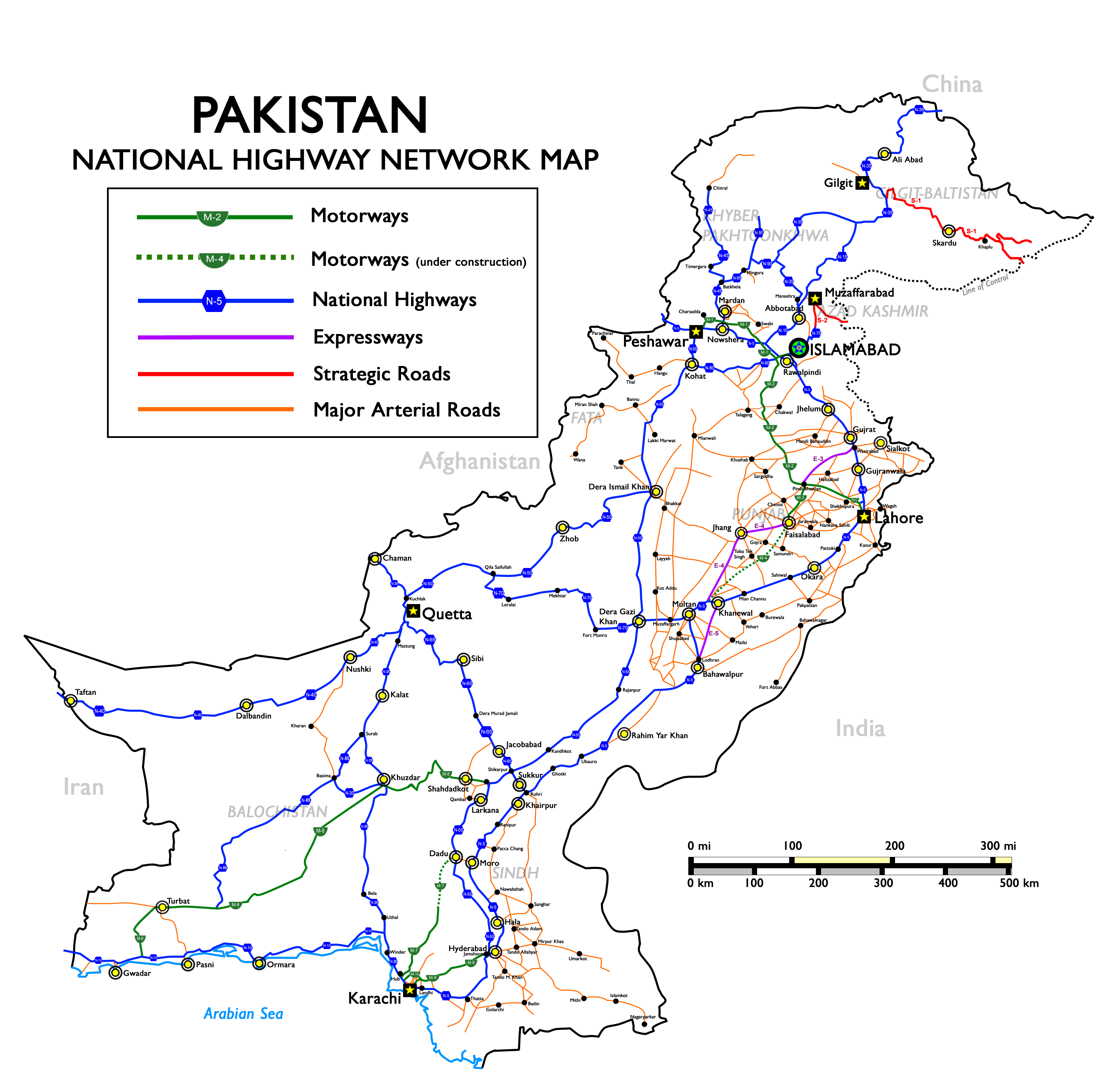
Map of National Highways of Pakistan also indicating N-50

The National Highway 50 (Urdu: قومی شاہراہ ۵۰) or the N-50 is one of Pakistan National Highway running from city of D.I.Khan in Khyber Pakhtunkhwa to the town of Kuchlak near Quetta via Zhob in Baluchistan, Pakistan. Its total length is 531 km divided into 143 km in Khyber Pakhtunkhwa and the remaining 388 km in the Baluchistan, Pakistan. It is maintained and operated by Pakistan's National Highway Authority.

On 30 Jan 2014, Prime Minister of Pakistan Nawaz Sharif inaugurated the Qila Saifullah to Zhob part of the highway.

== See also ==
- Motorways of Pakistan
- Transport in Pakistan
