= Khanote =

Village in Sindh province, Pakistan

Coordinates: 25°44′03″N 68°15′53″E

Khanoth is a village in Jamshoro District, Sindh province, Pakistan. The hamlet, the oldest in the district, is located on the Indus River, and is served by the Indus Highway. It is known for its coal mining industries called "The lakhra coal Mines". Its population is around 10,000. The village has 3 government schools. Khanoth Village has a big market where people from nearby villages come. There is one PPHI hospital in khanoth which serves as the only place for medicine. There is a train station in khanoth. The Budhal shah shrine is a well known shrine in the village where yearly Melo festival is organized.
