= N-85 National Highway =

Road in Pakistan

National Highway 85
- قومی شاہراہ ٨٥
- Surab–Hoshab Highway

Route information
- Maintained by NHA
- Length: 487 km (303 mi)

Major junctions
- North end: Surab
- South end: Hoshab

Location
- Country: Pakistan

Highway system
- Roads in Pakistan

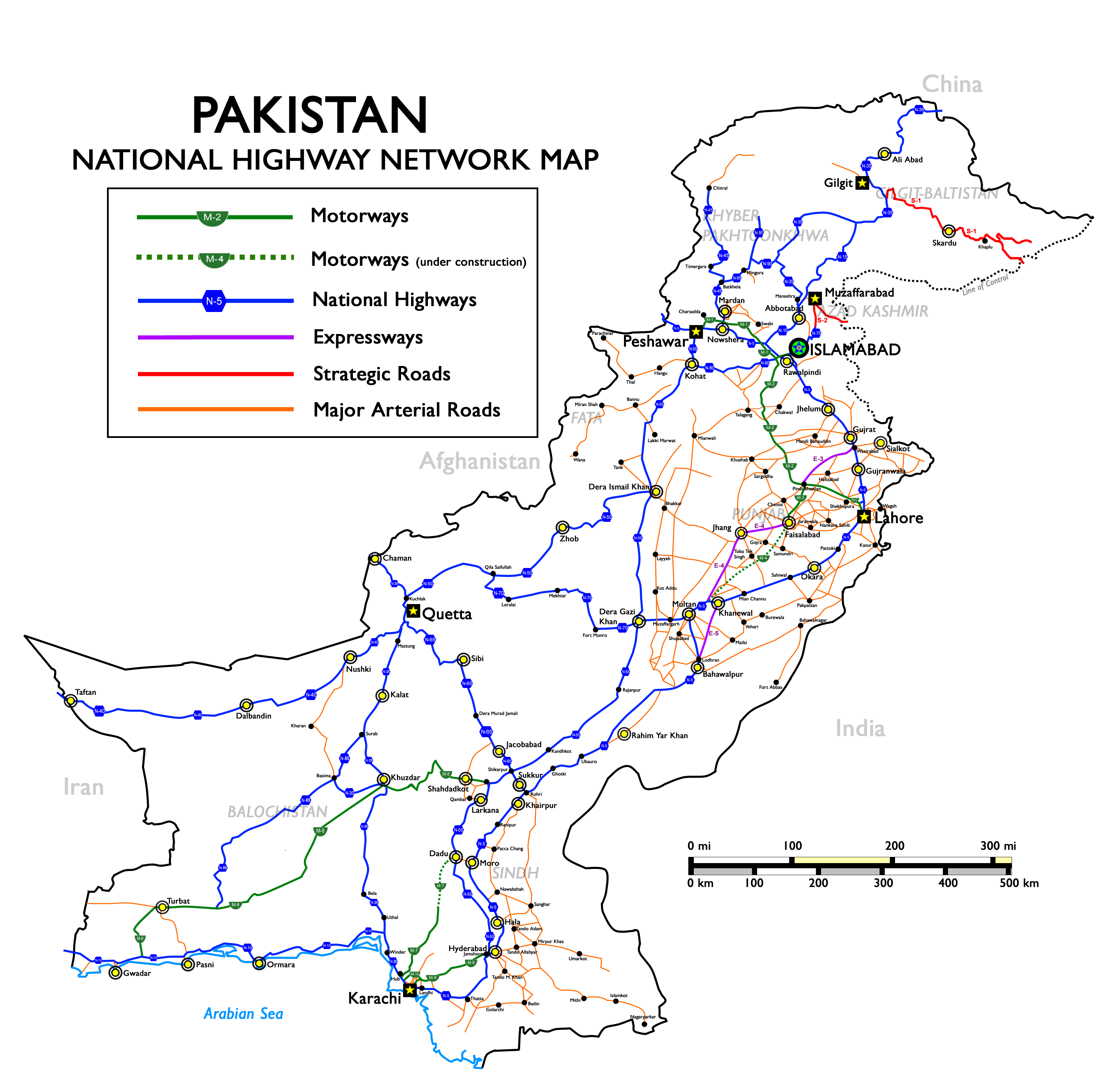
Map of National Highways of Pakistan also indicating N-85

The National Highway 85 (Urdu: قومی شاہراہ ۸۵) or the N-85 is an under-construction Pakistan National Highway and a major road for accessing southern parts of Baluchistan Province. Running from town of Surab in Kalat District to the town of Hoshab via Panjgur, Nag and Basima in Baluchistan Province of Pakistan, it then connects to M8 motorway. Its total length is 487 km the highway is maintained and operated by Pakistan's National Highway Authority.
