= Alexander Road =

Road in Islamabad, Pakistan

Route information
- Length: 7.5 km (4.7 mi)

Major junctions
- To: Kenthla Area

Location
- Country: Pakistan

Highway system
- Roads in Pakistan

Alexander Road is a roadway project in Islamabad, Pakistan that will connect Islamabad with the Haripur District.

== History ==
The road and the freshly built Margalla Avenue were both opened by Prime Minister Shehbaz Sharif on 20 June 2023, as the Capital Development Authority (CDA) was getting ready to start work.

== Route Description ==
The Alexander Well, a notable well located on the border between Islamabad and Haripur, is the name of the road. Although it is frequently called Alexander Road, an official name has not yet been decided. The 7.5 km-long road is intended to extend as far as the Kenthla Area, with potential links to the Haripur Area in the future. An engineer from the CDA claims that the road will be built within the limits of Islamabad and will end at the boundary between Islamabad and Haripur next to Kenthla well.

== See also ==
- Bhara Kahu Bypass
- Sikander-e-Azam Road
