= Kohat Tunnel =

Tunnel in Pakistan

Kohat Tunnel کوہاٹ سرنگ
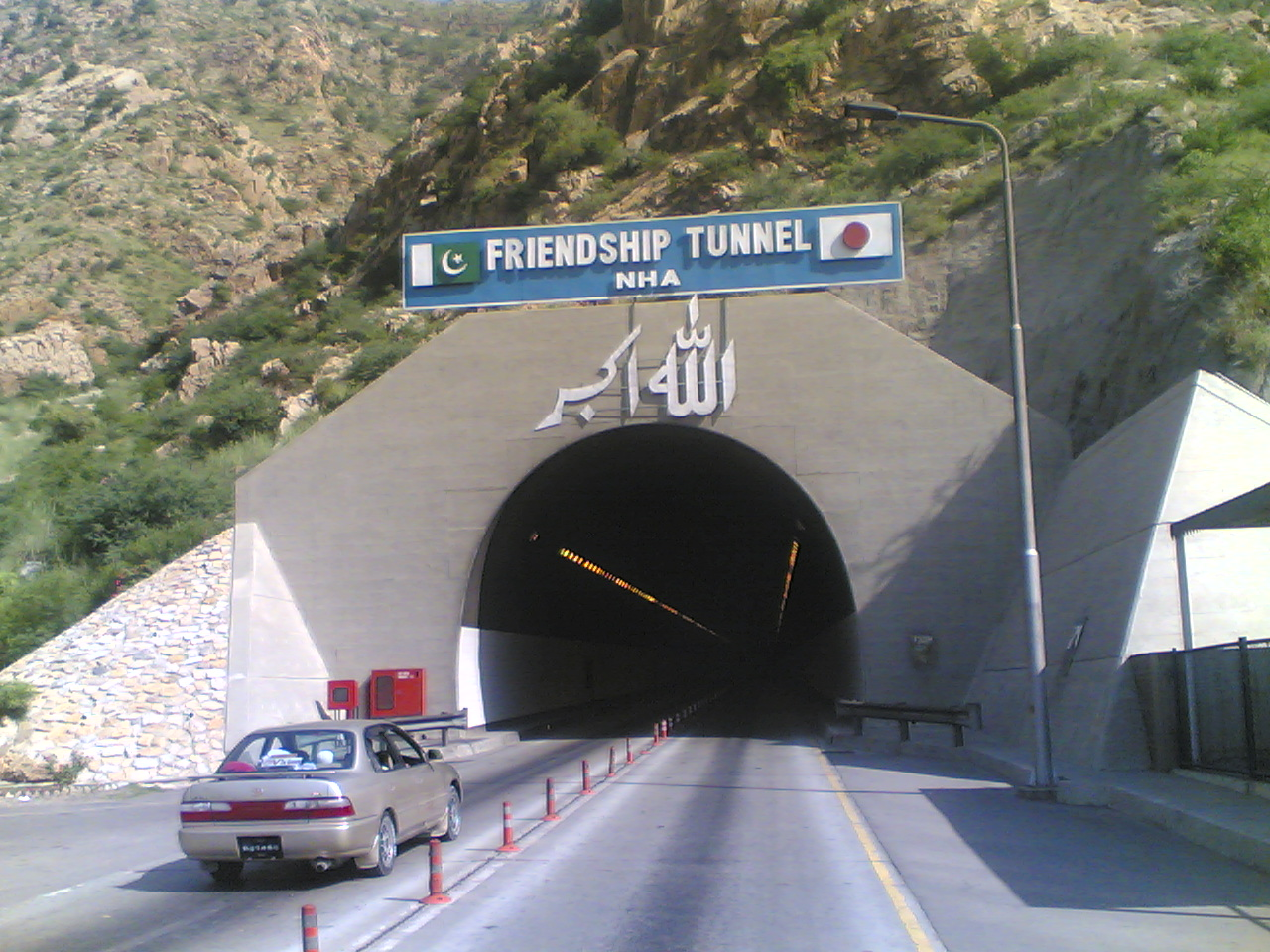
- The tunnel’s southern entrance
- Interactive map of Kohat Tunnel کوہاٹ سرنگ

Overview
- Location: Khyber Pakhtunkhwa, Pakistan
- Coordinates: 33°38′51″N 71°32′18″E
- Route: N55 (Indus Highway)
- Crosses: Khigana Mountains

Operation
- Work began: 1999; 27 years ago
- Opened: June 2003; 23 years ago

Technical
- Design engineer: Sadrul Ola Rizvi (Project Director - Indus Highway NHA)
- Length: 1.89 km (1 1/8 mi)
- Tunnel clearance: 3 m (9 ft 10 in)
- Width: 10.3 m (33 ft 10 in)

The Kohat Tunnel (Urdu: کوہاٹ سرنگ, Kohat Surang) is a 1.9-kilometre-long (1 1/8-mile) highway tunnel under the Khigana Mountains between Kohat District and Dara Adam Khel Tehsil in the Khyber Pakhtunkhwa province of Pakistan. The tunnel carries northbound and southbound traffic along N-55 National Highway (Indus Highway) under the Kohat Pass. The tunnel is also referred to as the Pak-Japan Friendship Tunnel, as it was constructed with assistance from the Economic Cooperation Fund of Japan.

== History ==
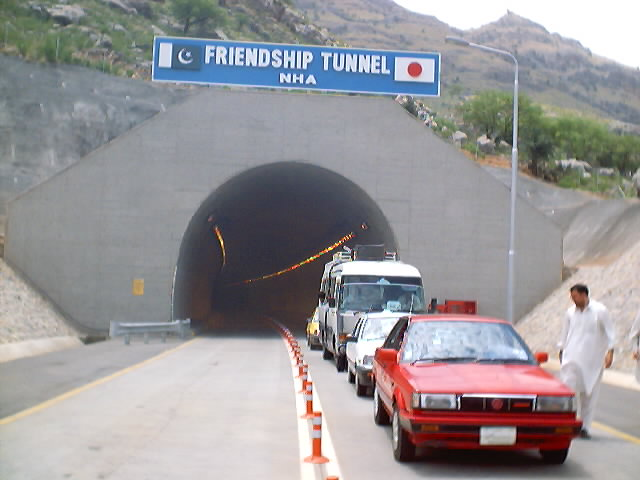
Kohat Tunnel

Construction on the tunnel began in 1999, and it opened to traffic in June 2003. As part of the developing Indus Highway system, the tunnel serves as a shorter, alternative route to the Kohat Pass, situated between the cities of Peshawar and Kohat. The new route decreases the travel time through the Kohat Pass by about 20 minutes. The main advantage of the tunnel is that long bodied vehicles can now use the Indus Highway whereas previously the hairpin bends on the Kohat Pass made it impossible for such vehicles to travel. It also helps alleviate traffic congestion, improve traffic safety and promote economic development.

The tunnel was at the center of a military confrontation between the Pakistan Army and pro-Taliban militants in early 2008. The militants had taken control of the tunnel around 24 January, after hijacking trucks carrying supplies and ammunition for security forces in South Waziristan. On 27 January, the security forces regained control of the tunnel, after "fierce fighting" involving artillery, helicopter gunships and heavy machineguns during which 24 militants were reported killed.

== Features and specifications ==
- Total project cost: Rs. 662.6 million (US$2.4 million)
- Length of north section: 7.7 kilometres
- Length of south section: 22.20 kilometres
- Black topped: 7.3 metres
- Shoulders: 3.0 metres
