= N-70 National Highway =

Road in Pakistan

National Highway 70
- قومی شاہراہ ٧٠
- Multan–Qilla Saifullah Highway

Route information
- Maintained by NHA
- Length: 440 km (270 mi)

Major junctions
- North end: Multan
- South end: Qila Saifullah

Location
- Country: Pakistan

Highway system
- Roads in Pakistan

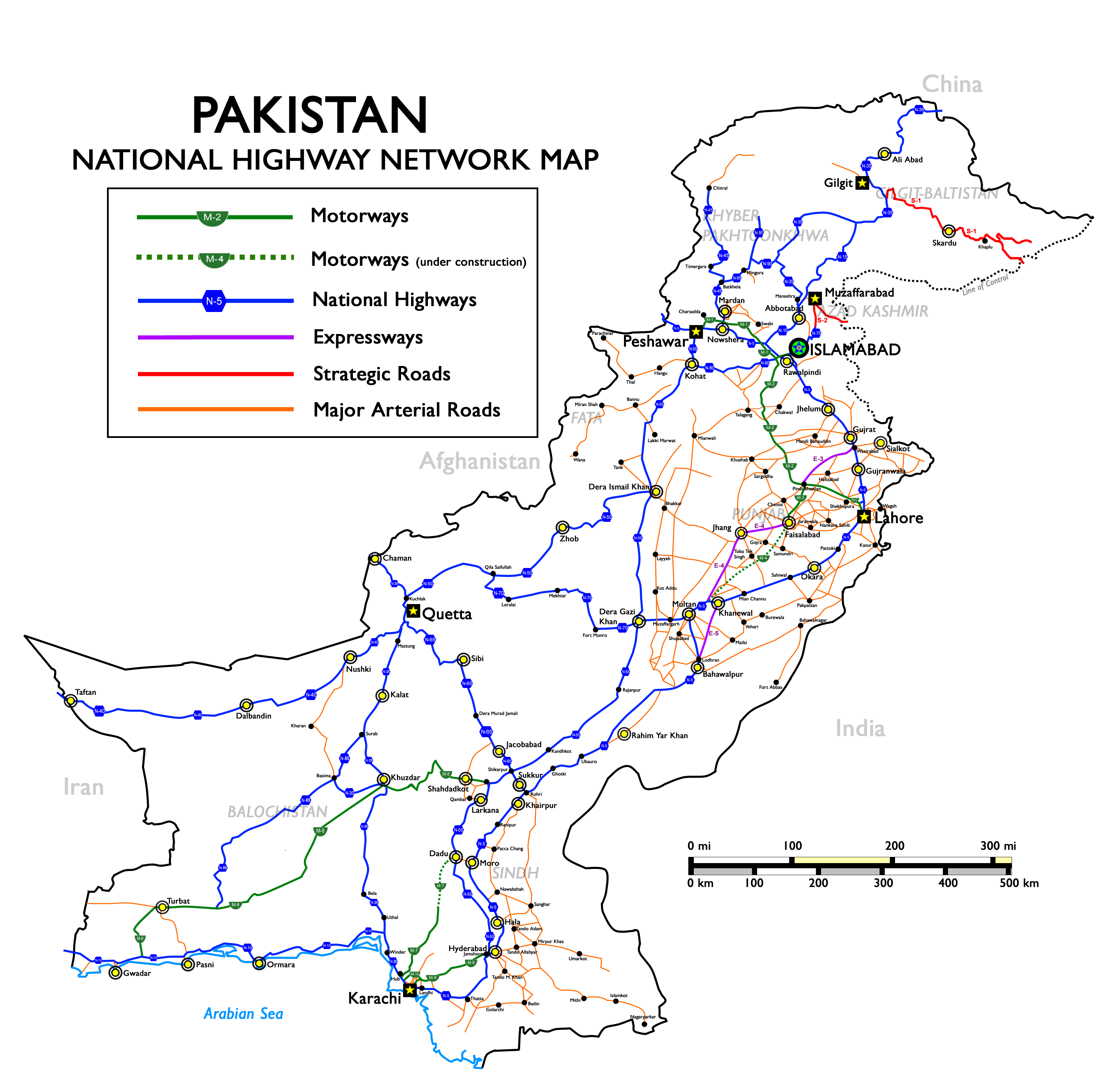
Map of National Highways of Pakistan also indicating N-70

The National Highway 70 (Urdu: قومی شاہراہ ۷۰), or the N-70, is one of the National Highways of Pakistan. It runs from the city of Multan in Punjab to the town of Qilla Saifullah via Dera Ghazi Khan, and Loralai in Balochistan province. Its total length is 440 kilometres (270 mi) divided into 254 kilometres (158 mi) in Balochistan and the remaining 186 km (116 mi) in the Punjab. It is maintained and operated by Pakistan's National Highway Authority.

The N-70 runs in between the Sulaiman Mountains, lush green farmlands of Multan and Dera Ghazi Khan's districts, and one can experience the sceneries of MusaKhel, Makhter region, and areas from Loralai to Qilla Saifullah.

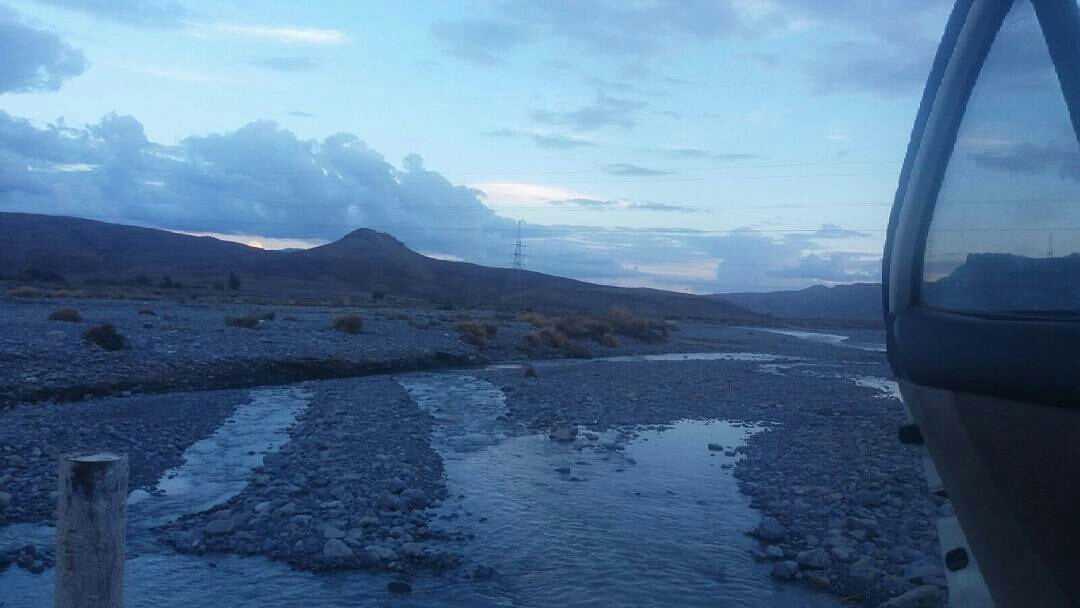
A fresh water fount, near Makhter town on N70

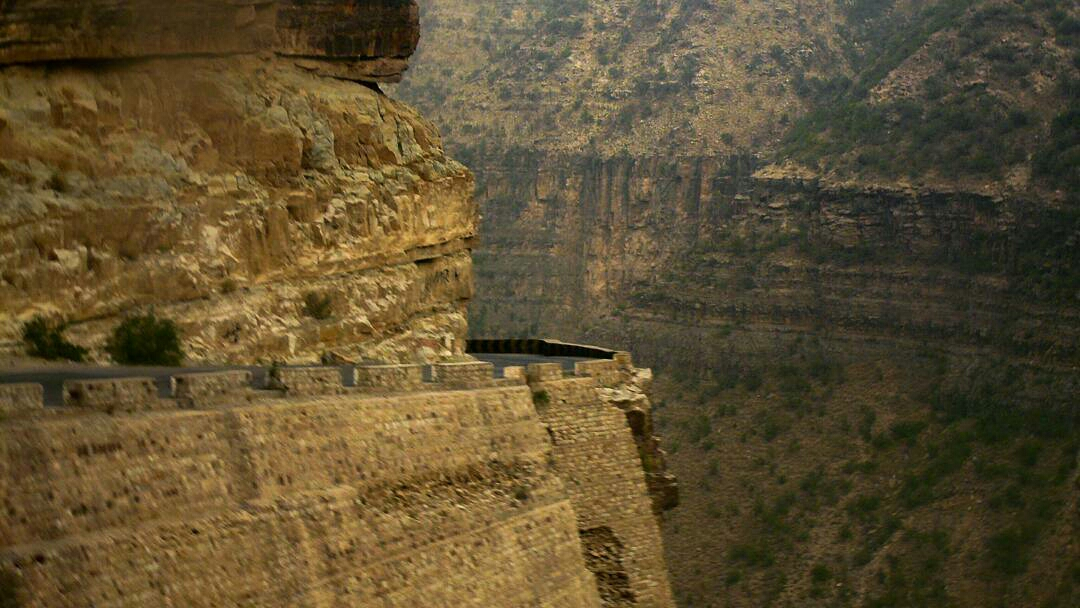
Girdu Pass (the pass in Sulemaan range that connects Punjab province with Balochistan Province) and the N70

== Route ==
The highway starts right after the junction of N-5 in the suburbs of Multan and runs towards Muzaffargarh after crossing river Chenab and then river Indus to enter D.G Khan. After D.G Khan it starts ascending on Sulemaan range and through Girdu Pass and Fort Munro it enters in Balochistan. The first town in Balochistan province is Rakni and then goes to Makhter region after passing long MusaKhel region and then Loralai and finally ends near Qilla Saifullah at the junction of N-50.

== See also ==
- Motorways of Pakistan
- Transport in Pakistan
- Motorway M10 Pakistan (Quetta - Multan Motorway)
