= Dasht e Goran =

Pakistani administrative area

Dasht-e-Goran Brahui: دشت گوران
- Tehsil of Kalat District
- Location within Balochistan, Pakistan Location within Pakistan
- Coordinates: 28°55′14″N 66°25′20″E
- Country: Pakistan
- Province: Balochistan
- District: Kalat District
- Headquarters: Dasht-e-Goran

Population (2023)
  - Total: 25,461

Literacy
- Time zone: UTC+5 (PST)

Dasht-e-Goran (Note: Balochi: دشت گوران,pronounced [d̪əʃt-e ɡoːɾɑːn]), is a tehsil and sub-division of Kalat District in Balochistan, Pakistan.

== History ==
Kalat State formally acceded to Pakistan in early 1948. Dasht-e-Goran has historically formed part of that state and was subsequently a union council of Kalat District. In 2017, Surab District was created from territory formerly part of Kalat District.

== Geography ==
The name Dasht-e-Goran is commonly rendered as "Plain of the Goran", a reference to local tribal groupings, though it has also been translated as "Plain of the Wild Ass". The tehsil is a high-altitude arid plain situated between Kalat and Surab. The landscape consists of wide valleys used for seasonal grazing and rain-fed agriculture.

== Demographics ==
According to the 2023 census, the population of Dasht-e-Goran sub-division is 25,461. The inhabitants are predominantly Brahui, with major tribes including the Zehri, Mengal, and Kambrani. The principal language is Brahui; Balochi is also widely spoken.

== Administration ==
Dasht-e-Goran is administered as a sub-division of Kalat District. It comprises several mouzas (villages), including Surmassang, Dat, Muhammadzai, and Baincha (partial).

== Economy ==
The local economy is based primarily on livestock rearing and dry-land farming, with sheep and goats as the principal animals kept. The installation of tube wells has enabled limited cultivation of fruits, including apples and peaches, though the area remains predominantly rural and dependent on seasonal rainfall.
