= N-90 National Highway =

Road in Pakistan

National Highway 90
- قومی شاہراہ ٩٠
- Kwazakhela–Besham Highway

Route information
- Maintained by NHA
- Length: 64 km (40 mi)

Major junctions
- North end: Khwazakhela
- South end: Besham

Location
- Country: Pakistan

Highway system
- Roads in Pakistan

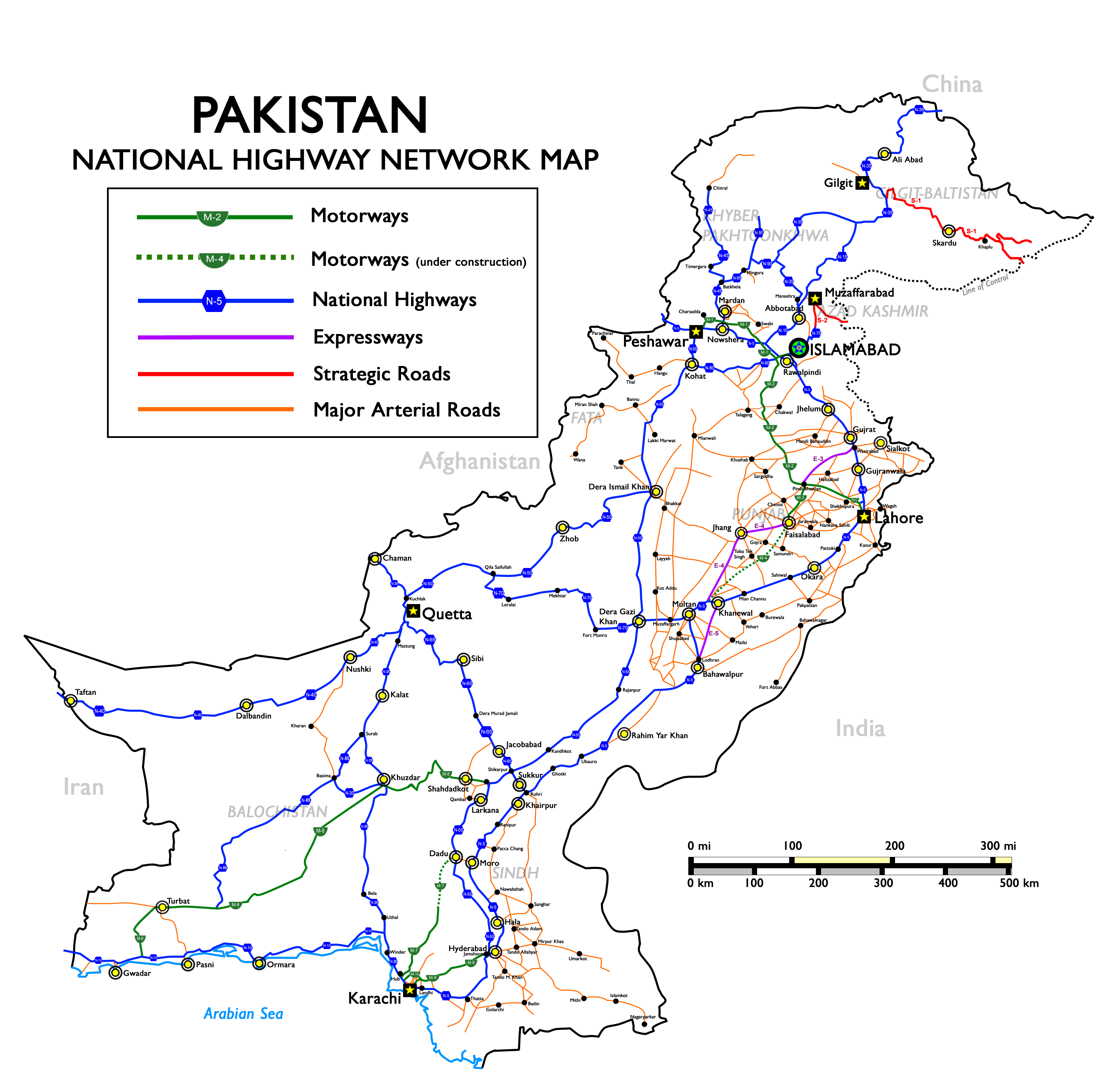
Map of National Highways of Pakistan also indicating N-90

The National Highway 90 (Urdu: قومی شاہراہ ۹۰) or the N-90 is one of Pakistan National Highway running from town of Khwazakhela in Swat District to the town of Besham in Shangla District in the Khyber Pakhtunkhwa province of Pakistan. The highway connects Malakand Division with the Karakoram Highway at Besham. Its total length is 64 km, the highway is maintained and operated by Pakistan's National Highway Authority.
