= Bhara Kahu Bypass =

Road in Islamabad, Pakistan

Barakahu Bypass

Route information
- Length: 5.4 km (3.4 mi)

Major junctions
- West end: Quaid-e-Azam University entry point
- East end: Jugi Bus Stop

Location
- Country: Pakistan

Highway system
- Roads in Pakistan

Barakahu Bypass is a 5.4km roadway project in Islamabad, Pakistan. The objective of the project was to create an alternate route leading to Murree, Kashmir, and Galiyat.

== History ==
The Barakahu Bypass project was assigned as a significant task to the Capital Development Authority (CDA) by Prime Minister Shehbaz Sharif. This project served as the first major development initiative launched by the current government. In September 2022, Prime Minister Shehbaz Sharif instructed the CDA to expedite the operationalization of the Barakahu bypass within a four-month timeline. The government entrusted the National Logistics Cell (NLC) with the responsibility of completing the project.

== Route Description ==
The construction contractor has been assigned the task of building a three-lane roadway spanning over 5 kilometers, connecting the Quaid-e-Azam University entry point to Jugi Bus Stop. The project is expected to be accomplished within a budget of Rs. 6.5 billion.

== Incident ==
on 25 February 2023, an incident took place on the Barakahu Bypass. During the construction of a flyover, one of its pillars gave way, leading to the loss of two laborers' lives, while three others suffered from various injuries.

== See also ==
- Alexander Road
- Sikander-e-Azam Road
