= Ratodero Tehsil =

Ratodero Tehsil تعلقہ رتو ڈیرو رتوديرو تعلقو
- Tehsil
- Interactive map of Ratodero Tehsil
- Coordinates: 27°48′1.048″N 68°17′31.893″E
- Country: Pakistan
- Province: Sindh
- District: Larkana

Area
  - Total: 138,002 km^{2} (53,283 sq mi)

Population (2015)
  - Total: 535,873 (estimated)
- Time zone: UTC+5 (PST)
- Calling code: 074
- Number of towns: 60
- Number of Union councils: 9

Ratodero Tehsil (Sindhi: رتوديرو) is a tehsil, located in the Larkana District in the Sindh province of Pakistan. It is about 28 km from the district capital Larkana. Before the partition of India, the city had a special reputation for its sweet products.

The principal trade of the town is paddy and rice, and there are many rice mills.

== History ==
In 710 AD, Muhammad bin Qasim conquered the Sindh and Balochistan. Later the Delhi Sultanate and later Mughal Empire ruled the region. Sindh became predominantly Muslim due to missionary Sufi saints whose dargahs dot the landscape of Sindh.

Ratodero is considered about 350 years old. During British rule Ratodero became a Taluka of Larkana District and for a period part of the Bombay Presidency. The population according to the 1891 census of India was 61,268, which rose to 72,312 at the next census in 1901.

The Imperial Gazetteer of India, compiled in the first decade of the twentieth century, described the Taluka of Ratodero as follows: "The tāluka contains one town, RATO-DERO (population, 4,281), the headquarters; and 80 villages. Excepting Larkana, this is the most thickly populated tāluka in the District, with a density of 222 persons per square mile. The land revenue and cesses in 1903-4 amounted to more than 2-9 lakhs.The great Sukkur Wah (the Canal leading from the Indus) once flown near the Saint Nadar Shah, was a main source of irrigation and trade port. Merchants used to trade with Sukkur and other adjacent towns through the boats via this canal. It contains about 104 square miles (270 km2) of `reserved' forest". Dhaak Talaa was another source of beauty of Ratodero. Which was a main picnic point in the mid of the town. Now it is remained in the name only.

Bashir Khan Qureshi famous JSQM leader was born in Ratodero and also is buried in the tehsil.

== Geography ==
Ratodero town is the headquarters of the Taluka of the same name. It is situated in 27∘080’4514” latitude in north and 68∘029’2209” longitude in east. It is located on the way from Larkana to Shikarpur. Besides, many roads, both main and link, lead from this town to surrounding towns and villages. There are roads leading to Jacobabad, Sijawal Junejo, Shahdad Kot, Kamber, MiroKhan, Naudero and Larkana.

== Administration ==
Ratodero Taluka is administratively subdivided into 9 Union Councils. These are:

- Lashari
- Mushtaque Korkani
- Behman
- Bunguldero
- Jumo Agham
- Naudero
- Pir Bakhsh Bhutto
- Rarodero-I
- Ratodero-Ii
- Maso Dero
- Waris Dino Machi
