= Pir Bakhsh Bhutto =

Coordinates: 27°45′0″N 68°20′0″E

Pir Bakhsh
- Village and union council
- Interactive map of Pir Bakhsh
- Country: Pakistan
- Region: Sindh
- Time zone: UTC+5 (PST)

Pir Bakhsh is a village and union council, an administrative subdivision, of Ratodero Taluka in the Sindh province of Pakistan. It is located at 27°45'0N 68°19'60E and lies to the south-east of Ratodero
