= Surab Tehsil =

Pakistani administrative area

Surab Tehsil Brahui: تحصیل سوراب Soorab, Sorab
- Tehsil of Surab District
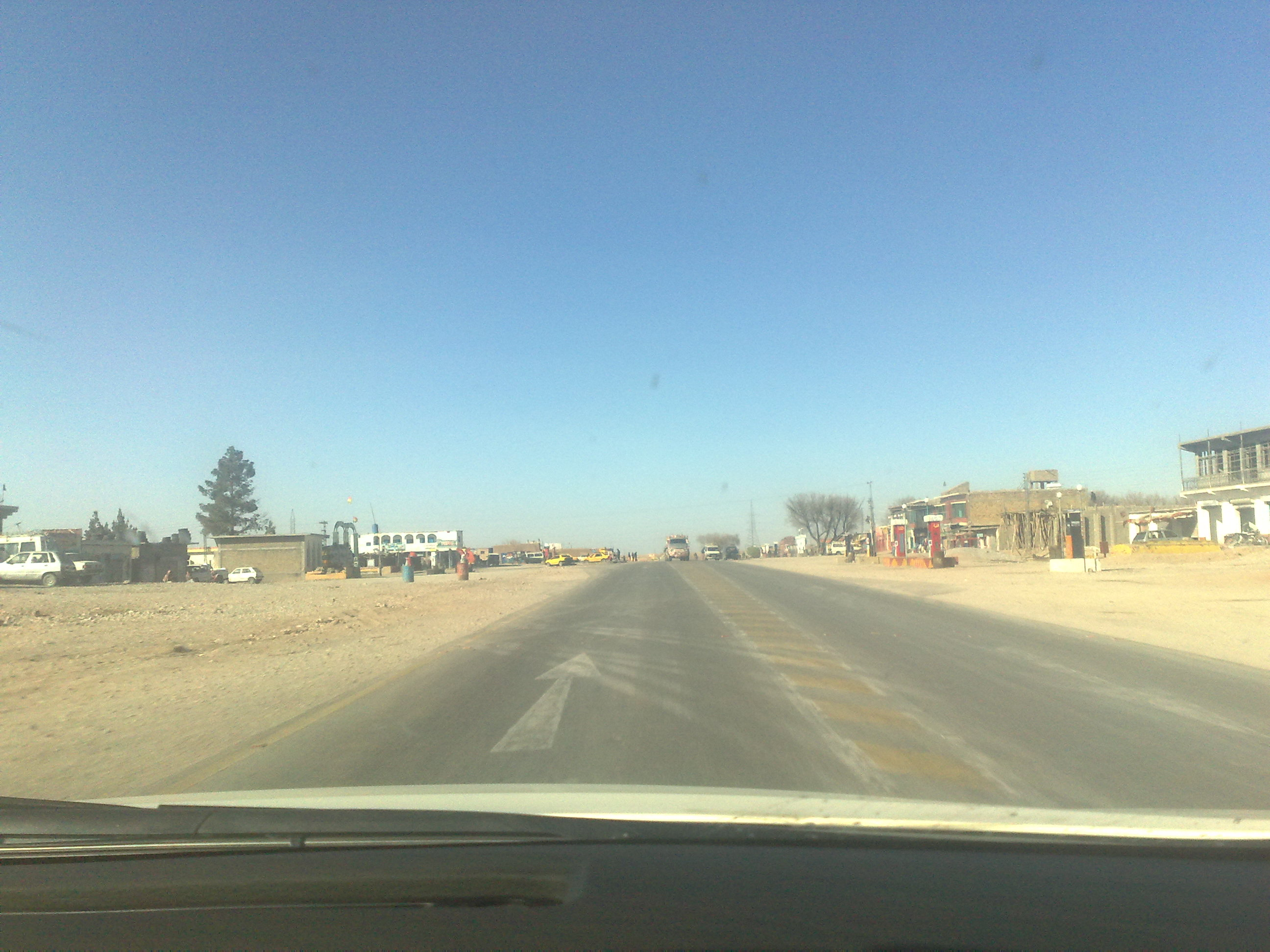
- On the N-25 National Highway in Surab Tehsil

- Location within Balochistan, Pakistan Location within Pakistan
- Coordinates: 28°30′00″N 66°15′0″E
- Country: Pakistan
- Province: Balochistan
- District: Surab District
- Tehsil: Surab

Area
  - Tehsil of Surab District: 233 km^{2} (90 sq mi)
- Elevation: 1,762 m (5,781 ft)

Population (2023)
  - Tehsil of Surab District: 95,469
  - Density: 409.74/km^{2} (1,061.2/sq mi)
  - Urban: 36,468 (38.2%)
  - Rural: 59,001 (61.8%)

Literacy
  - Literacy rate: Total: (34.34%); Male: (43.21%); Female: (25.99%)
- Time zone: UTC+5 (PST)
- Main languages: 91,107 Brahui, 3,964 Balochi, 126 Pashto

Surab Tehsil, (Note: Brahui: تحصیل سوراب, pronounced [t̪əhsˈiːl suːˈɾaːb], Balochi: تحصیل سوراب, pronounced [t̪ahˈsiːl soːˈɾaːb]) is an administrative sub-subdivision (tehsil) of Surab District, in central Balochistan, Pakistan. It lies about 82 kilometres (51 mi) northwest of Khuzdar, and 111 kilometres (69 mi) south from Kalat, forming the northern part of the district.

According to the 2023 national census, the tehsil has a population of 95,469. Agriculture, particularly the cultivation of temperate fruit and winter vegetables, forms the basis of the local economy, though yields are constrained by chronic by chronic water scarcity. [oultry farming is also present, including a government-run facility in Surab.

== Geography ==
Covering an area of approximately 233 square kilometres (90 sq mi), equivalent to 30.6% of the district's total area, Surab Tehsil is largely arid and mountainous. Elevations generally exceed 900 metres (3,000 ft), with some peaks rising above 1,700 metres (5,600 ft).

Vegetation is sparse and drought-adapted, including species such as Capparis aphylla (karir), Periploca aphylla (milk broom), and Caralluma tuberculata (pipa). The tehsil is prone to earthquakes, floods, and droughts, and includes sections of the Central Brahui Range of the Sulaiman Mountains.

== Climate ==
Situated at an elevation of 1,762 metres (5,781 ft) above sea level, Surab has a cold desert climate (Köppen climate classification). The average annual temperature is 26.7 °C (80.1 °F), over 5% higher than Pakistan's averages. Surab typically receives about 13.6 millimetres (0.54 in) of precipitation and has 26.75 rainfall per year.

== Population ==
The 2023 census recorded 95,469 residents in 15,389 households. The population density is relative is about 409 persons per square kilometre. The literacy rate is 34.34%, with significant gender disparities: 43.21% for males and just 25.99% for females, reflecting limited educational access, particularly for women and girls.

=== Language ===
Brahui is spoken by about 95.4% of the population (91,107 people), followed by Balochi, (4.2%, 3,964 people), Pashto (0.13% 126 people), and other languages (0.3% of the population).

== Insurgency ==
Since early 2000s, the province has been affected by unrest associated with the Insurgency in Balochistan.

Armed groups, including the Balochistan Liberation Army, have sought greater political autonomy and control over local natural resources, though such resources are not a major factor in the tehsil or district. Security concerns compounded by persistent socio-economic challenges, including widespread poverty, inadequate healthcare and education, and underdeveloped infrastructure.
