= 2019 Sindh HIV outbreak =

In the Ratodero area in Sindh, Pakistan

- Disease: HIV
- Location: Ratodero area, Larkana District, Sindh, Pakistan
- First reported: April 2019
- Confirmed cases: 895

The 2019 Sindh HIV outbreak refers to a Grade II Emergency as declared by the World Health Organization in the Ratodero area of Larkana District, Sindh, Pakistan. It was the first of many outbreaks of HIV in Pakistan in which the majority of those infected were children.

By 13 June 2019, at least 798 people including more than 650 children had tested positive for HIV out of the 27,000 people who volunteered for screening. By October 2019, approximately 1,100 people including almost 900 children under 12 had tested positive although the majority of the population still had not been screened at the many temporary testing centers that had been established. By 19 November 2019, there were 895 confirmed cases with 754 being children out of the 37,272 people to have been screened for the virus.

The causes of the outbreak were identified by health officials as "unhygienic practices" including re-use without sterilization of medical syringes and needles in doctors' clinics and blood banks, barbers' razors, tattoo needles, nose- and ear-piercing tools, circumcision blades, and dental instruments. Transmission from mother to child was also cited as a possible cause.

== Background ==
Between 2010 and 2017 Pakistan registered a 45% increase in overall HIV cases. National AIDS Control Programme assumed there were ~165 000 people in Pakistan who had contracted HIV, with only 15% of the number being aware of their condition, and only 17,149 patients receiving antiretroviral (ARV) therapy.

In April 2019, 15 children with persistent fevers were sent for HIV testing at a government facility. Blood tests returned positive results, while perinatal transmission in these children was ruled out. HIV screening of 4,100 of the area's residents revealed 157 additional HIV positive patients, 30 of the positive cases were adults and 127 were children. An inquiry by MoNHSRC found the cause of the outbreak could be traced back to contaminated disposable syringes, which were likely used by someone posing as a doctor.

== Response ==
The Sindh AIDS Control Programme carried out a massive testing campaign which encompassed more than 26,000 people. By June 2019, more than 750 people were diagnosed with HIV, with children making up 80% of the number. In order to ensure an immediate access to antiretroviral (ARV) therapy, a specialized clinic was established in Larkana. In cooperation with the United Nations, Pakistan began implementing the "Sindh HIV Outbreak Response Plan, May 2019-Apr 2020”, which included both short-term and long-term steps to identify the causes of the outbreak, to address them, and prevent further infections.
