= Surab District =

District in Balochistan, Pakistan

Surab District ضلع سوراب
- District of Balochistan
- Map of Balochistan with Surab District highlighted in maroon
- Country: Pakistan
- Province: Balochistan
- Division: Kalat
- Established: 2017
- Headquarters: Surab

Government
  - Type: District Administration
  - Deputy Commissioner: N/A
  - District Police Officer: N/A
  - District Health Officer: N/A

Area
  - Total: 762 km^{2} (294 sq mi)

Population (2023)
  - Total: 279,038
  - Density: 366/km^{2} (948/sq mi)
  - Urban: 36,468 (13.07%)
  - Rural: 242,570 (86.93%)

Literacy
  - Literacy rate: Total: (37.44%); Male: (45.16%); Female: (29.58%)

Surab District formerly (Shaheed Sikandarabad District) (Balochi: سۏراپ) (Brahui and Urdu: سوراب) is a district located in Kalat Division of Balochistan province, Pakistan. Prior to its creation as a separate district in 2017, Surab was part of Kalat District.

== Administration ==
The town of Surab serves as the headquarters of the district. It has following tehsils:

Tehsil	Area (km^{2})	Population (2023)	Density (ppl/km^{2}) (2023)	Literacy rate (2023)	Union Councils
Dasht e Goran	215	27,503	127.92	38.85%	...
Zehri Tehsil	215	27,503	127.92	38.85%	...
Gidder	205	89,631	437.22	36.31%	...
Shaheed meharabad zehri	109	66,435	609.50	42.85%	...
Surab Tehsil	233	95,469	409.74	34.34%	...

== Demographics ==
=== Population ===
Historical population
Year	Pop.	±% p.a.
1951	...	—
1961	8,636	—
1972	21,738	+8.75%
1981	94,720	+17.77%
1998	93,401	−0.08%
2017	200,857	+4.11%
2023	279,038	+5.63%

As of the 2023 census, Surab district has 51,227 households and a population of 279,038. The district has a sex ratio of 103.11 males to 100 females and a literacy rate of 37.44%: 45.16% for males and 29.58% for females. 114,615 (41.08% of the surveyed population) are under 10 years of age. 36,468 (13.07%) live in urban areas.

Surab is largely based on a tribal society and one of the main tribes would be the Muhammad Hassani tribe.

=== Religion ===
In the 2023 census, 822 (0.29%) people in the district were from religious minorities, mainly Christians.

=== Language ===
Languages of Surab district (2023)
1. Brahui (96.8%)
2. Balochi (2.90%)
3. Others (0.35%)

At the time of the 2023 census, 96.75% of the population spoke Brahui and 2.90% Balochi as their first language.

== See also ==
- Districts of Pakistan
  - Districts of Balochistan, Pakistan
- Tehsils of Pakistan
  - Tehsils of Balochistan, Pakistan
- Divisions of Pakistan
  - Divisions of Balochistan, Pakistan
