= Togh Bala =

Coordinates: 33°33′N 71°30′E

- Union Council
- Interactive map of Togh Bala
- Country: Pakistan
- Province: Khyber Pakhtunkhwa
- District: Kohat
- Time zone: UTC+5 (PST)

Togh Bala is an administrative unit (known as union council) of Kohat District in the Khyber Pakhtunkhwa province of Pakistan.

District Kohat has 2 Tehsils i.e. Kohat and Lachi. Each Tehsil comprises a certain number of union councils. There are 32 union councils in district Kohat.

== See also ==
- Kohat District
