= Ratodero =

Ratodero رتّو ڈیرو
- City
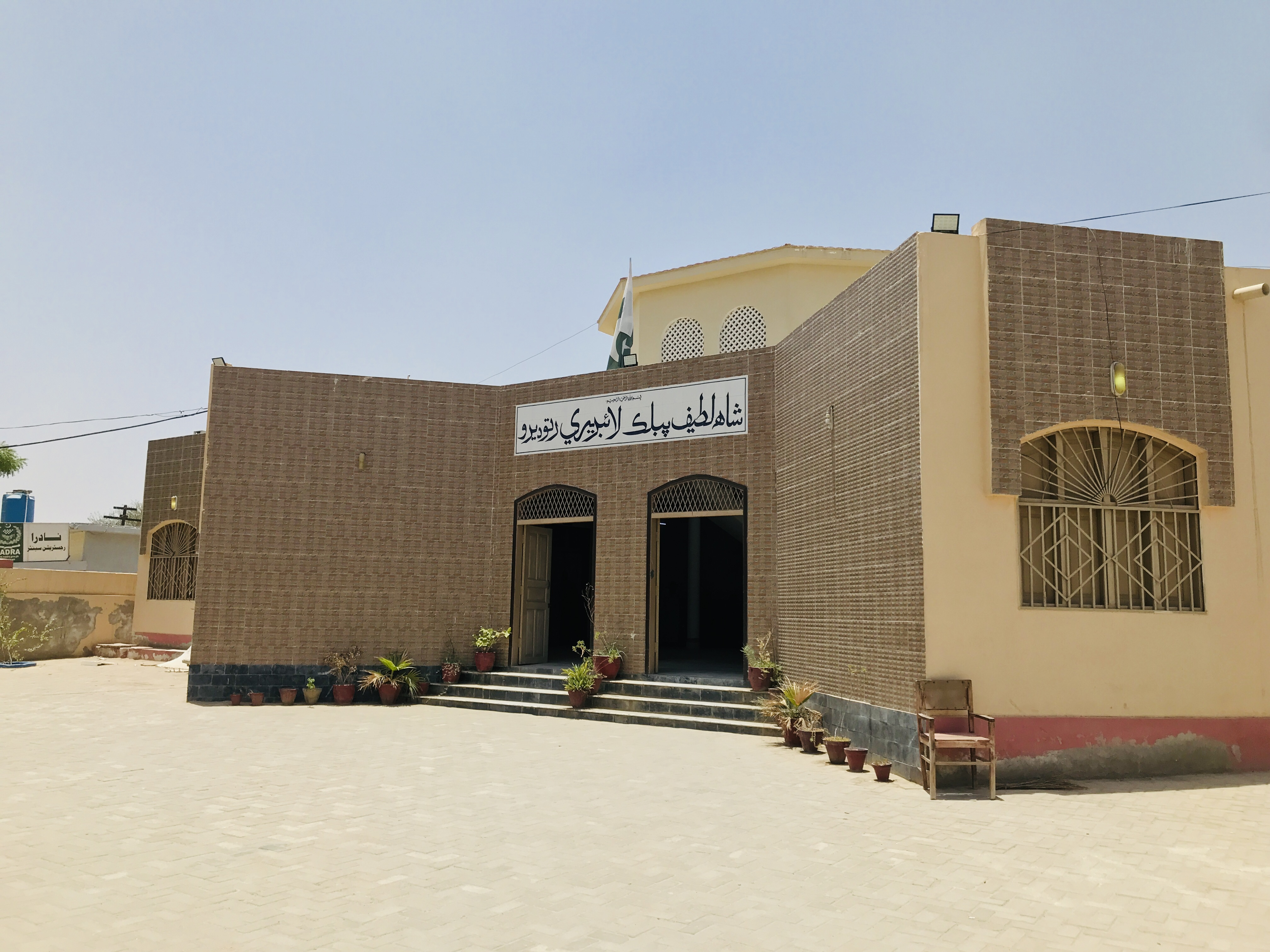
- Shah Latif Public Library Ratodero

- Location within Sindh Location within Pakistan
- Coordinates: 27°48′N 68°17′E
- Country: Pakistan
- Province: Sindh
- District: Larkana District

Government
  - Type: Municipal Committee
  - Chairman: Muneer Ahmed
  - Vice-Chairman: Nadeem Akhtar

Area
  - City: 138,002 km^{2} (53,283 sq mi)

Population (2023 census)
  - City: 81,935
  - Rank: 153rd in Pakistan
- Time zone: UTC+5 (PST)
- Calling code: 074
- Number of towns: 60
- Number of Union councils: 9

Ratodero (Urdu: رتّو ڈيرو) also known as Ratta Dera (Urdu: رَتّا ڈیرہ) is a city and the capital of Ratodero Taluka, a sub-division of Larkana District in the Sindh province of Pakistan. Situated some 28 km from the district capital Larkana. Since the independence of Pakistan, the city is known for its sweet products and handmade caps known as Sindhi topi. At present the principal trade of the town is that of paddy and rice, with many rice mills located here.

== Geography ==
Ratodero is the administrative headquarters of the Taluka of the same name, and located on the way from Larkana to Shikarpur. As a regional transportation hub, many roads lead from Ratodero to surrounding towns and villages, such as Gharrhi Khairo, Jacobabad, Shahdadkot, Kamber, MiroKhan, and Naudero.

== Demographics ==
Historical population
Year	Pop.	±% p.a.
1972	13,292	—
1981	19,704	+4.47%
1998	40,217	+4.29%
2017	67,502	+2.76%
2023	81,935	+3.28%

According to the 2023 census, Ratodero had a population of 81,935, compared to 67,502 recorded in the 2017 census, showing significant population growth over the six-year period.

Languages

First Languages of Ratodero city in (2023 Pakistani census)
1. Sindhi (95.7%)
2. Brahvi (3.50%)
3. Balochi (0.30%)
4. Urdu (0.20%)
5. Others (0.30%)

== Administration ==
Ratodero Taluka is administratively subdivided into 9 Union Councils:

- Behman
- Bunguldero
- Jumo Agham
- Naudero
- Wada Bosan
- Pir Bakhsh Bhutto
- Rarodero-I
- Ratodero-II
- maso Dero
- Waris Dino Machi
- Ahmed Khan Lashari
- Ahmed Khan Jalbani
- Wazir Khan Jalbani

== Government departments ==
There are many government offices in the town including

- Mukhtiarkar office
- Taluka Education Offices (Male & Female)
- Sub court
- Taluka Police headquarters
- Executive Engineer WAPDA
- Sui southern gas office
- Sub rural health centre
- Sixty-bed hospital
- Post office
- Government high school
- Degree college
- SARCO (NGO)
- Government Monotechnique College
- Government Technical Training Center
- Kashaf Foundation (NGO)
- SRSO-Sindh Rural Support Organization (NGO)

== Political hub ==
Ratodero is considered to be political centre of Pakistan Peoples Party. Former prime minister Zulfiqar Ali Bhutto and first female prime minister Benazir Bhutto are buried in this Taluka but the Ratodero city has been badly neglected since long, and lacks any prominent educational institution, water supply system, or hospital to deal with emergency situations. The government has neglected the city as cadet colleges, Rice Research Institute, airport and industrial estates have been established in other Talukas of the district whereas Ratodero city lacks all of that.

== See also ==
- Your Government
- Ratodero Home page
- 2019 Sindh HIV outbreak
