= Kuchlak =

Kuchlak کچلاک Kuchlagh
- City
- Location in Pakistan Location in Balochistan
- Coordinates: 31°5′0″N 67°6′20″E
- Country: Pakistan
- Province: Balochistan
- Town: Chiltan Town

Population
  - Total: 184,818
- Area code: 87000

Kuchlak (Pashto: کچلاک), also Kuchlagh (Pashto: کچلاغ), sometimes referred to as Kachlak, is a town in Kuchlak Tehsil near Quetta, in the province of Balochistan, Pakistan. It is governed by a union council in Chiltan Town, Quetta. Kuchlak is home to Halaqa Number 61, one of the largest halaqas in Quetta. Kuchlak is well known for summer fruits such as apples and peaches; however, soil aridity is a problem. Vegetables grown in the valley include tomatoes, potatoes, onions and turnips.

== Climate ==
Kuchlak has a continental arid climate with great variation between summer and winter temperatures. Summer highs can reach 40 °C (104 °F), while winter temperatures can drop to −19 °C (−2 °F). Summer begins in late May and continues until early September, with average temperatures ranging from 24–26 °C (75–79 °F). Autumn runs from late September to mid-November, with average temperatures in the 12–18 °C (54–64 °F) range. Winter starts in late November and ends in late March, with average temperatures near 4–5 °C (39–41 °F) and snow during the months of January and February. Spring starts in early April and ends in late May, with average temperatures close to 15 °C (59 °F). Unlike most of Pakistan, Kuchlak does not have a monsoon with sustained, heavy rainfall; snowfall during the winter months is the principal mode of precipitation.

== Education ==
Arbab Ghulam Ali Kasi Government Inter College is the only institute of higher learning in Kuchlak. There are three boys public high schools, two girls high schools and many primary and middle schools. Several private educational institutions and schools also exist in the town. For higher education, most students are travel over 25 km daily to Quetta (the nearest city) for study in tertiary educational institutions such as:

- University of Balochistan (UoB)
- Balochistan University of Information Technology, Engineering and Management Sciences (BUITEMS)
- Iqra University
- Government Science College, Quetta
- Government Degree College
- Bolan Medical College and Hospital
- Al-Hamd University
- Government Girls Degree College, Quetta
- Government Girls Degree College, Quarry Road, Quetta
- Sardar Bahadur Khan Women's University Brewery Road Western Bypass, Quetta
- Noble Institute of Computer Programming Kuchlak.

== Taliban presence ==
In August 2019, it was reported that the area has served as the Taliban's main meeting place, medical center, and resting place after combat. The town's Khair Ul Madarais mosque, which was bombed in August 2019, was the main meeting place for the Taliban.

== See also ==
- Pishin
- Chaman
- Qilla Abdullah
- Ziarat
- Qilla Saifullah
- Loralai
- Zhob
- Afghanistan
- Kandahar
- Helmand
- Herat
- Kabul
