= Killa Saifullah =

Killa Saifullah قلعہ سيف الله Qilla Saifullah
- City
- Location within Balochistan, Pakistan Location within Pakistan
- Coordinates: 30°42′5″N 68°21′35″E
- Country: Pakistan
- Province: (Balochistan, Pakistan) Balochistan
- District: Killa Saifullah
- Elevation: 1,561 m (5,121 ft)

Population (2023)
  - City: 35,043
- Time zone: UTC+5 (PST)
- Highways: N-50

Killa Saifullah (Pashto: قلعه سيف الله), or Qilla Saifullah, is a city in the Killa Saifullah District of the Balochistan province of Pakistan. A fort (qilla) built in the district by Saifullah Khan, belonging to the Mirdadzai Khoidadza sub-clan of Kakar tribe, has lent its name to the city.

Killa Saifullah is famous for its fertile soil producing fruits and vegetables. Numerous apple and apricot orchards dispatch fruits to other provinces. The export of vegetables like tomatoes, carrots and chillies is done commercially on roads and adding enormous share in the agriculture production of the country. The livestock breeders in Killa Saifullah produce much livestock share for meat and milk purpose for the Balochistan province, especially for the regions of the Quetta and Zhob divisions.

== Historical background ==
Saifullah was born in 1827 in Killa Saifullah (previously known as the Upper Zhob) and was a grandson of religious scholar Faizullah Akhunzada (Zarh Nikka).

Killa Saifullah is a district in northwestern Balochistan. It was established as a district in 1988 comprising two former administrative units of Zhob District: the Upper Zhob sub-division and the sub-tehsil of Badinai, previously named Kashatoo and part of the sub-district of Kakar Khurasan.. The British sent Zhob Expedition in 1884 in order to occupy the Zhob region through Baratkhail. In the meanwhile in a battle, the castles of Saifullah Khan Khoidadzai and Shah Jehan Jogezai (The Badshah of Zhob) were demolished. On 7 October 1884, an assault on the Qalla (castle) of Shah Jehan near Akhterzai resulted the killings of many tribal people including Malik Hamza Daulatzai and Mohammad Ghous who fought bravely. All 500 tribal Sardars admitted their submission before the British forces and also signed an agreement that they will not interfere in the affairs of the British government in the Zhob region. However, Saifullah Khan Khoidadzai and Shah Jehan Jogezai, had a narrow escape from the battle scene and established themselves at Kalat Afghanistan, where they used to operate their insurgency campaign against the British and never subdued before the British occupying forces.

== Demographics ==
=== Population ===
Historical population
Year	Pop.	±% p.a.
1951	...	—
1961	555	—
1972	835	+3.78%
1981	...	—
1998	8,129	—
2017	34,865	+7.96%
2023	35,043	+0.08%

As of the 2023 census, Killa Saifullah has population of 35,043.

== Notable people ==
- Nawab Ayaz Jogezai
- Usman Khan Kakar
- Arman Loni
- Wranga Loni
- Arfa Siddiq
- Maulana Abdul Wasay
- Khan Zaman Kakar
- Khushal khan kakar
- Baikar Nika

== Incidents ==
=== June 2022 ===
On 8th of June, 2022, a bus fell into a ravine while traveling on a narrow road in Qilla Saifullah. All 22 people on board died. The tragedy happened in Akhtarzai, close to Killa Saifullah bazaar.
