= Capital Development Authority =

A Capital Development Authority is a special sort of entity found in various countries that is concerned with the municipal development of the capital city or capital territory of that country. Examples include:

- Capital Development Authority (Islamabad): the Capital Development Authority of Islamabad, capital of Pakistan
- Capital Development Authority (Dodoma): the Capital Development Authority of Dodoma, capital of Tanzania
- Federal Capital Development Authority: the Capital Development Authority of Abuja, capital of Nigeria
- Kampala Capital City Authority: a government agency in Kampala, capital of Uganda
- Metropolitan Manila Development Authority: a government agency in Metro Manila, capital of the Philippines
- National Capital Authority: a government agency in Canberra, capital of Australia
- Nusantara Capital City Authority: a government agency in Nusantara, capital of Indonesia
- Rajdhani Unnayan Kartripakkha: the Capital Development Authority of Dhaka, capital of Bangladesh
