= Surab, Pakistan =

Town in Balochistan, Pakistan

Surab سوراب
- Town
- Location within Balochistan, Pakistan Location within Pakistan
- Coordinates: 28°29′33″N 66°15′35″E
- Country: Pakistan
- Province: Balochistan
- Division: Kalat
- District: Surab
- Elevation: 1,771 m (5,810 ft)

Population (2023)
  - Total: 36,468
- Time zone: UTC+5 (PST)
- Calling code: 0844

Surab (Balochi, and Urdu: سوراب) is a town in central Balochistan, Pakistan with a population of 36,468. It serves as the administrative centre of Surab Tehsil and Surab District, which was established on 1 August 2017 following its separation from Kalat District. The town is located in a valley of the Central Brahui Range at the junction of the N-25 and N-85 national highways.

On 30 May 2025, Surab was attacked by militants of the Balochistan Liberation Army, resulting in the killing of a local government official, the burning of his residence, the looting of a bank, and assaults on other key sites.

== Demographics ==
Historical population
Year	Pop.	±% p.a.
1998	11,148	—
2017	35,594	+6.30%
2023	36,468	+0.41%

As of the 2023 census, Surab has population of 36,468.

== See also ==
- List of cities in Pakistan by population
  - List of cities in Balochistan, Pakistan by population
