= Naudero =

Naudero نَئو ڈیرو - نئون ڊيرو
- City
- Location within Sindh Location within Pakistan
- Coordinates: 27°40′5″N 68°21′40″E
- Country: Pakistan
- Province: Sindh
- District: Larkana

Population (2023 Census)
  - Total: 52,846
- Time zone: UTC+5 (PST)

Naudero, also spelled Naundero, Nodero (Sindhi: نئون ڊيرو, Urdu: نَؤ ڈیرو) is a city and union council of Ratodero Taluka in the Larkana District, Sindh, Pakistan. The union council also includes the village of Garhi Khuda Bakhsh, site of the Bhutto family mausoleum which includes the graves of former prime ministers Zulfiqar Ali Bhutto and his daughter Benazir Bhutto. It lies to the northwest of the district capital Larkana, connected by road. Irrigated by canals, the area is noted for its rice production. A sugar mill has been constructed in the area, funded by the Chinese.

== Demographics ==
Population

Historical population
Year	Pop.	±%
1972	6,987	—
1981	14,554	+108.3%
1998	28,150	+93.4%
2017	48,983	+74.0%
2023	52,846	+7.9%

According to 2023 census Naudero town population was 52,846 inhabitants.

Languages

Languages of Naudero Town (2023 Census)
1. Sindhi (99.9%)
2. Others (0.10%)
