= Roads in Pakistan =

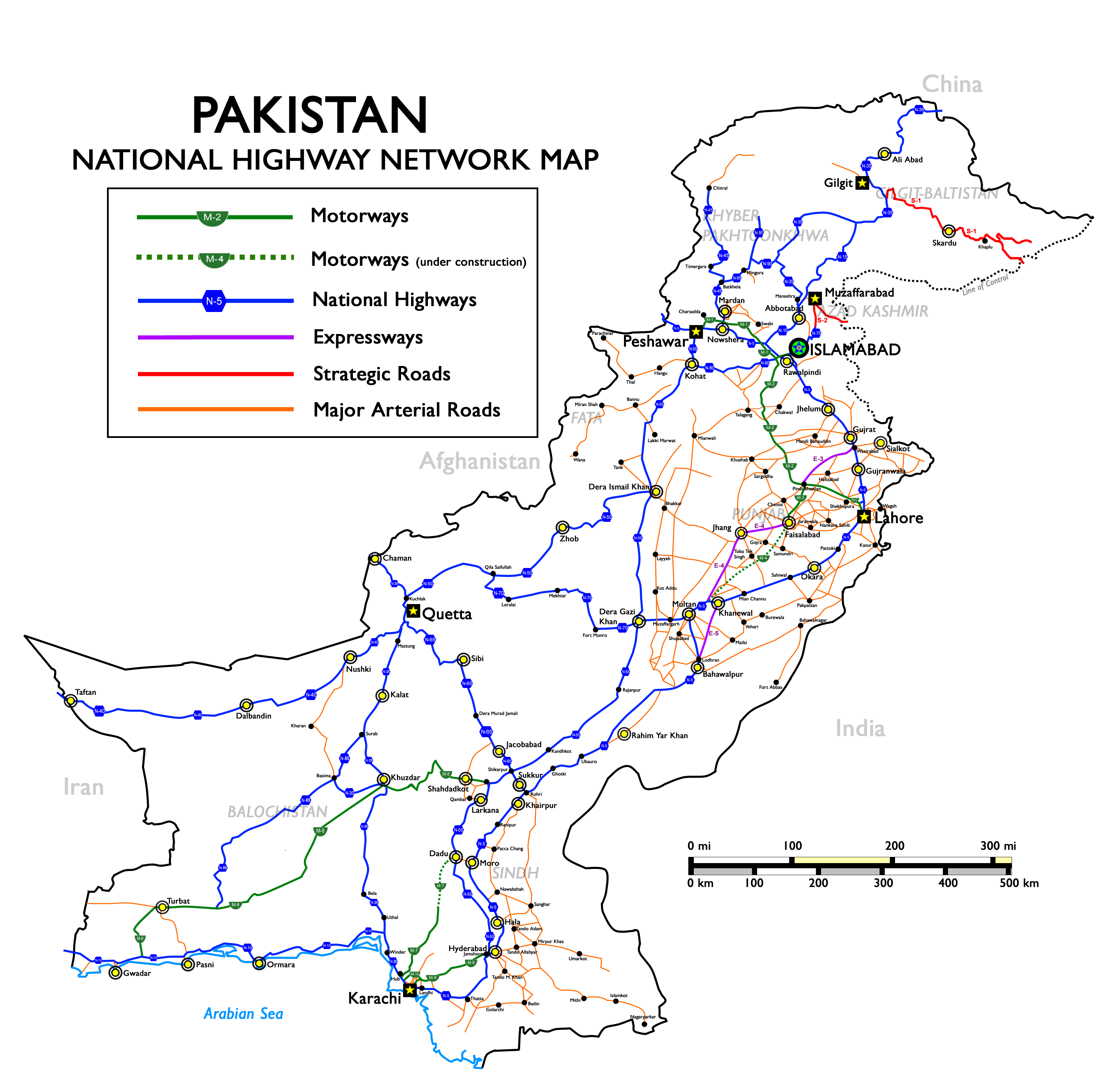
National Highways, Motorways & Strategic Roads of Pakistan.

Roads in Pakistan (Urdu: پاکستان میں سڑکیں, romanized: pākistān mãĩ saṛkẽ) are generally classified as federal, provincial and municipal roads.

== Federal roads ==
Federal roads are controlled by the Government of Pakistan and maintained by the National Highway Authority. They are divided into three classes.

== Provincial and territorial roads ==
Provincial and territorial roads are controlled by the respective provincial and territorial governments of Pakistan and maintained by each province's Highway Authority.

=== Khyber Pakhtunkhwa ===
Provincial Highways of Khyber Pakthunkhwa consists of all public highways maintained by Khyber Pakthunkhwa. The Pakhtunkhwa Highways Authority under the Department of Transportation maintains over 3,089.65 kilometres (1,919.82 mi) of roadways organized into various classifications which criss-cross the province and provides access to major population centers. All provincial highways in Khyber Pakhtunkhwa are pre-fixed with the letter 'S' followed by the unique numerical designation of the specific highway (with a hyphen in the middle), i.e. S-1, S-2, S-3, etc.

=== Gilgit-Baltistan ===
Provincial Highways of Gilgit-Baltistan consists of all public highways maintained by Gilgit-Baltistan. The Gilgit-Baltistan Highway Department under the Planning & Development Department maintains over 1,000 kilometres (620 mi) of roadways organised into various classifications which criss-cross the province and provide access to major population centers.

=== Punjab ===
Provincial Highways of Punjab consists of all public highways maintained by Punjab. The Punjab Highway Department under the Department of Transportation maintains over 38,000 kilometres (24,000 mi) of roadways organized into various classifications which criss-cross the province and provide access to major population centres.

=== Sindh ===
Provincial Highways of Sindh consists of all public highways maintained by Sindh. The Sindh Highways Department under the Works & Services Department maintains over 4,800 kilometres (3,000 mi) of roadways organised into various classifications which criss-cross the province and provide access to major population centers.

== Municipal roads ==
Municipal roads are controlled by the respective district governments or city governments.

=== Azad Kashmir ===
- Roads in Kotli
- Roads in Muzaffarabad
- Roads in Mirpur

=== Balochistan ===
- Roads in Gwadar
- Roads in Quetta
- Roads in Turbat

=== Gilgit-Baltistan ===
- Roads in Gilgit
- Roads in Skardu

=== Khyber Pakhtunkhwa ===
- Roads in Abbottabad
- Roads in Mardan
- Roads in Peshawar

=== Punjab ===
- Roads in Faisalabad
- Roads in Lahore
- Roads in Multan
- Roads in Rawalpindi

=== Sindh ===
- Roads in Hyderabad
- Roads in Karachi
- Roads in Sukkur

== See also ==
- Transport in Pakistan
- National Highways of Pakistan
