= National Highway Authority (Pakistan) =

Federal government agency in Pakistan

National Highway Authority مقتدرہ قومی شاہرات
- Abbreviation: NHA
- Formation: 1991; 35 years ago
- Legal status: Active
- Headquarters: Islamabad, Pakistan
- Coordinates: 33.677066°N 73.030734°E
- Region served: Pakistan
- Official language: Urdu; English
- Chairman: Muhammad Sheheryar Sultan
- Website: nha.gov.pk

The National Highway Authority (NHA; Urdu: مقتدرہ قومی شاہرات) is a statutory body under the Ministry of Communications of Pakistan. It is responsible for the maintenance, construction, and operation of Pakistan's network of national highways and motorways. It is also responsible for formulating policy on developing the road network, and implementing regulations and standards on road construction and safety.

== History ==
In 1978, the Government of Pakistan federalised five important interprovincial roads and named them "National Highways". That same year, the National Highway Board was set up to monitor the development and maintenance of these federalised roads by provincial highway departments. In 1991, the National Highway Authority Act of 1991 was passed, replacing the National Highway Board with the newly-created NHA and tasking it with monitoring the works and administration of national highways, motorways, expressways and strategic roads.

== Function ==
The function of the NHA is to plan, develop, operate, repair and maintain all roads entrusted to the NHA by the Government of Pakistan. The NHA is the custodian of 48 national highways, motorways, expressways and strategic roads, with a total length of 14,480 kilometres (9,000 mi) (4.6% of the national road network). The NHA is committed to providing a safe, modern and efficient transportation system and playing an important role in the development of Pakistan's micro and macro economy by enhancing national integration.

== See also ==
- National highways of Pakistan
- Transport in Pakistan
- Motorways of Pakistan
