= Zardari =

Zardari may refer to:

- Zardari (tribe), a Baloch tribe of Pakistan
- Zardari family, a Pakistani political family
  - Asif Ali Zardari (born 1955), former President of Pakistan and husband of former prime minister Benazir Bhutto
  - Hakim Ali Zardari, (1930–2011), a Pakistani politician and father of Asif Ali Zardari
  - Bilawal Bhutto Zardari (born 1988), chairman of the Pakistan Peoples Party, son of Asif Ali Zardari and Benazir Bhutto
