= Trials of Benazir Bhutto and Asif Ali Zardari =

Corruption scandal in Pakistan

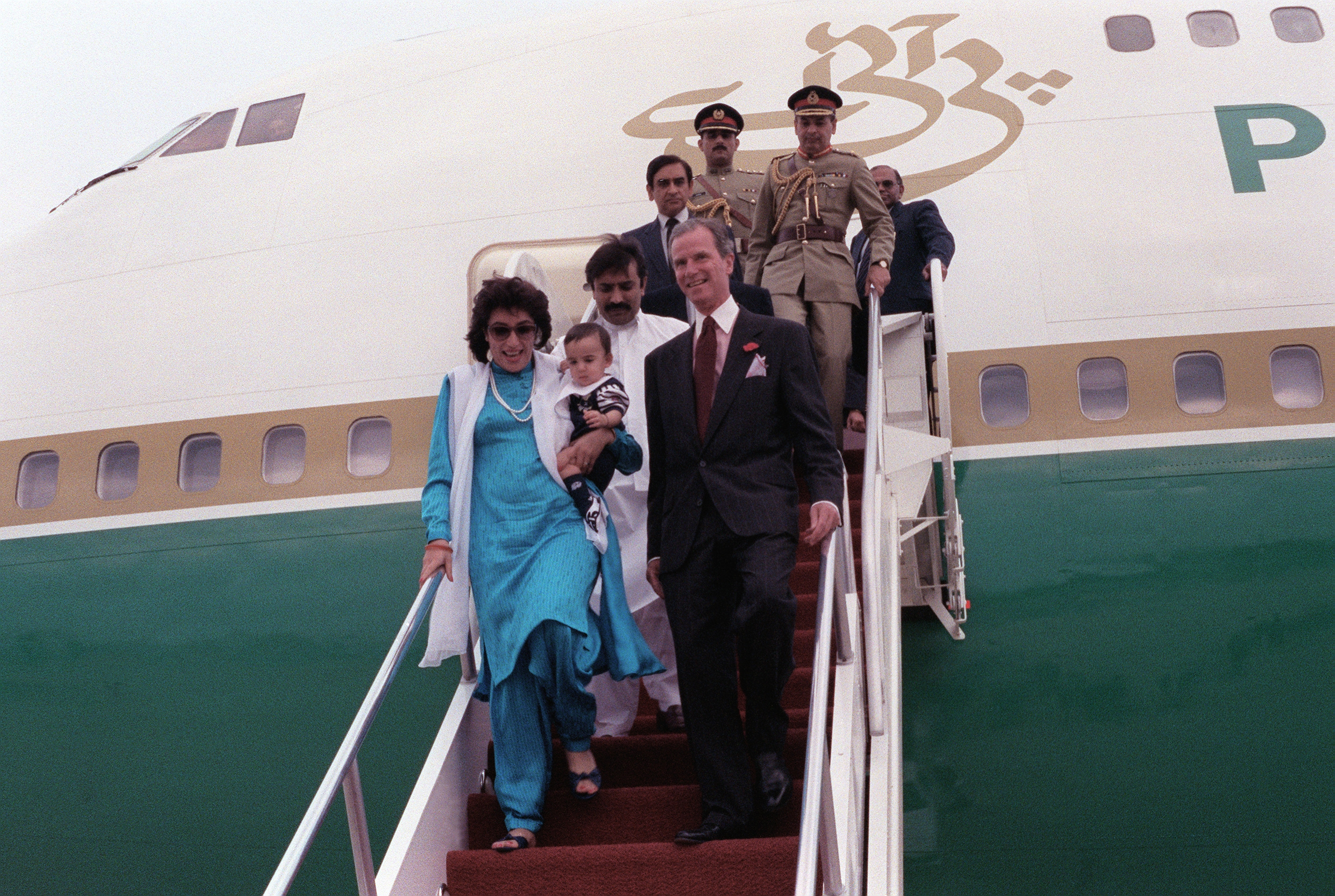
Benazir Bhutto, accompanied by her husband Zardari and son Bilawal, US visit in 1989, during Bhutto's government

After the dismissal of Benazir Bhutto's first government on 6 August 1990 by President Ghulam Ishaq Khan on grounds of corruption, the government of Pakistan issued directives to its intelligence agencies to investigate the allegations. After the fourth national elections, Nawaz Sharif became the Prime Minister and intensified prosecution proceedings against Bhutto. Pakistani embassies through Western Europe—in France, Switzerland, Spain, Poland and Britain—were directed to investigate the matter. Bhutto and her husband faced a number of legal proceedings, including a charge of laundering money through Swiss banks. Though never convicted, her husband, Asif Ali Zardari, spent eight years in prison on similar corruption charges. After being released on bail in 2004, Zardari suggested that his time in prison involved torture.

A 1998 New York Times investigative report claims that Pakistani investigators have documents that uncover a network of bank accounts, all linked to the family's lawyer in Switzerland, with Asif Zardari as the principal shareholder. According to the article, documents released by the French authorities indicated that Zardari offered exclusive rights to Dassault, a French aircraft manufacturer, to replace Pakistan's air force's fighter jets in exchange for a 5% commission to be paid to a Swiss corporation controlled by Zardari. The article also said a Dubai company received an exclusive licence to import gold into Pakistan for which Asif Zardari received payments of more than $10 million into his Dubai-based Citibank accounts. The owner of the company denied that he had made payments to Zardari and claims the documents were forged.

Bhutto maintained that the charges levelled against her and her husband were purely political. In 2006, after 15 long years an Auditor General of Pakistan (AGP) report was brought forward when then-President Pervez Musharraf was trying to gain support from Bhutto. According to this report, Benazir Bhutto was ousted from power in 1990 as a result of a witch hunt approved by then-president Ghulam Ishaq Khan. The AGP report says Khan illegally paid legal advisers 28 million rupees to file 19 corruption cases against Bhutto and her husband in 1990–92.

Yet the assets held by Bhutto and her husband continue to be scrutinised and speculated about. The prosecutors have alleged that their Swiss bank accounts contain £740 million. Zardari also bought a neo-Tudor mansion and estate worth over £4 million in Surrey, England, UK. The Pakistani investigations have tied other overseas properties to Zardari's family. These include a $2.5 million manor in Normandy owned by Zardari's parents, who had modest assets at the time of his marriage. Bhutto denied holding substantive overseas assets.

== Switzerland ==
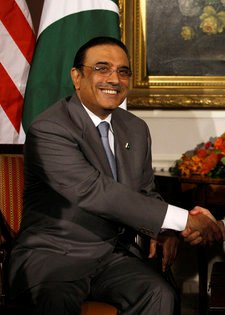
Asif Ali Zardari

On 23 July 1998, the Swiss Government handed over documents to the government of Pakistan which relate to corruption allegations against Benazir Bhutto and her husband. The documents included a formal charge of money laundering by Swiss authorities against Zardari. The Pakistani government had been conducting a wide-ranging inquiry to account for more than $13.7 million frozen by Swiss authorities in 1997 that was allegedly stashed in banks by Bhutto and her husband. The Pakistani government recently filed criminal charges against Bhutto in an effort to track down an estimated $1.5 billion she and her husband are alleged to have received in a variety of criminal enterprises. The documents suggest that the money Zardari was alleged to have laundered was accessible to Benazir Bhutto and had been used to buy a diamond necklace for over $175,000. The PPP has responded by flatly denying the charges, suggesting that Swiss authorities have been misled by false evidence provided by the Government of Pakistan.

On 6 August 2003, Swiss magistrates found Bhutto and her husband guilty of money laundering. They were given six-month suspended jail terms, fined $50,000 each and were ordered to pay $11 million to the Pakistani government. The six-year trial concluded that Bhutto and Zardari deposited in Swiss accounts $10 million given to them by a Swiss company in exchange for a contract in Pakistan. The couple said they would appeal. The Pakistani investigators say Zardari opened a Citibank account in Geneva in 1995 through which they say he passed some $40 million of the $100 million he received in payoffs from foreign companies doing business in Pakistan. In October 2007, Daniel Zappelli, chief prosecutor of the canton of Geneva, said he received the conclusions of a money laundering investigation against former Pakistani Prime Minister Benazir Bhutto on 29 October, but it was unclear whether there would be any further legal action against her in Switzerland.

== Poland ==
The Polish Government has given Pakistan 500 pages of documentation relating to corruption allegations against Benazir Bhutto and her husband. These charges are in regard to the purchase of 8,000 tractors in a 1997 deal. According to Pakistani officials, the Polish papers contain details of illegal commissions paid by the tractor company in return for agreeing to their contract. It was alleged that the arrangement "skimmed" Rs 103 mn rupees ($2 million) in kickbacks. "The documentary evidence received from Poland confirms the scheme of kickbacks laid out by Asif Zardari and Benazir Bhutto in the name of (the) launching of Awami tractor scheme", APP said. Bhutto and Asif Ali Zardari allegedly received a 7.15% commission on the purchase through their front men, Jens Schlegelmilch and Didier Plantin of Dargal S.A., who received about $1.969 million for supplying 5,900 Ursus tractors.

== France ==
=== Defence deals with Dassault and DCNS ===
Potentially the most lucrative deal alleged in the documents involved the effort by Dassault Aviation, a French military contractor. French authorities indicated in 1998 that Bhutto's husband, Zardari, offered exclusive rights to Dassault to replace the air force's fighter jets in exchange for a five percent commission to be paid to a corporation in Switzerland controlled by Zardari.

At the time, French corruption laws forbade bribery of French officials but permitted payoffs to foreign officials, and even made the payoffs tax-deductible in France. However, France changed this law in 2000.

== Pakistan ==
=== Islamabad forest land case ===
During the tenure of Benazir Bhutto in 1990, the government of Pakistan approved a deal for the construction of a luxury hotel and golf course on a 287-acre forested area in Islamabad. The project became the center of controversy, with allegations of corruption and nepotism leveled against the government. These allegations were cited by President Ghulam Ishaq Khan as justification for the dismissal of Bhutto's government.

The land, estimated to be worth between $15 million and $30 million, was allocated to a company for a mere $930,000. The company's address was traced to a residential property in London. The deal faced political scrutiny from the opposition, with a lawsuit filed by opposition leaders alleging the involvement of Bhutto's husband, Asif Ali Zardari, and her father-in-law, Hakim Ali Zardari. The legal action halted the finalization of the deal. In response, Zardari filed a defamation lawsuit, supported by a statement from the London firm denying any involvement of the Zardari family.

=== Cotecna corruption case ===
In 1997, Saifur Rehman, then-chairman of the National Accountability Bureau, filed a case against A.R. Siddiqui, a former chairman of the Federal Board of Revenue, and several others, including Benazir Bhutto, her husband Asif Ali Zardari, and her mother Nusrat Bhutto, for allegedly awarding a corrupt contract to the Swiss company Cotecna. The prosecution presented 14 witnesses but failed to convince the judge of the case's merit. Siddiqui was accused of awarding the contract to Cotecna, which specializes in cargo inspection, at the behest of Bhutto during her second term as prime minister, violating government rules on contracts and procurement.

The case was moved to a court in Rawalpindi in 2001, and seven Cotecna directors, including its chairman, were declared proclaimed offenders for not responding to court summons. Under Swiss law in the 1990s, bribing foreign officials to obtain contracts was legal and tax-deductible. The case was temporarily closed after Bhutto's assassination in 2007, with Siddiqui being the sole accused on trial.

In 2011, Judge Jahandad Khan Banth dismissed the charges against Siddiqui but stated that Zardari would face charges after his presidential immunity expired. Nusrat Bhutto was granted temporary immunity due to poor health. The case revolved around the alleged 6% bribe on the expected revenue stream from the $131 million contract awarded to Cotecna.

=== SGS S.A. corruption case ===
On April 16, 1999, former Pakistani Prime Minister Benazir Bhutto and her husband, Asif Ali Zardari, were convicted by the Lahore High Court for accepting kickbacks from Societe Generale de Surveillance, a Swiss inspection company, during Bhutto's second term. The court sentenced both to five years in prison, barred Bhutto from holding political office, and fined the couple $8.6 million. The conviction was the result of an investigation by Pakistan's Accountability Bureau, an agency established under Prime Minister Nawaz Sharif's Accountability Act of 1997.

The legal case centered around allegations that Societe Generale de Surveillance secured a contract with the Pakistani government by agreeing to pay Zardari a 6% commission, which was then deposited into a Swiss account owned by Zardari's offshore company, Bomer Finance. Prosecutors claimed that the funds were used to purchase luxury items, including a $188,000 diamond necklace.

Bhutto, who was in London at the time of the verdict, denied the charges and accused Sharif of politically motivated attempts to undermine her.

=== Helicopter scandal ===
In 1998–1999, an enquiry was conducted by the Public Accounts Committee (PAC) of the Parliament to investigate the matter regarding the purchase of the helicopter. The case involves defrauding substantive sum of $2.168 million and $1.1 million public money. The record shows that the case was not pursued properly nor diligently. FIR No 1 of 1998 was registered with Federal Investigation Agency State Bank Circle Rawalpindi on the complaint of Cabinet Division. Thorough investigation was conducted by the committee headed by Chaudhry Muhammad Barjees Tahir and two other members, namely Faridullah Jamali and Jamshaid Ali Shah. During this investigation the committee chairman Barjees Tahir summoned both the former President Farooq Leghari and former Prime Minister Benazir Bhutto along with others, and they were investigated. The case received extensive media coverage both inside and outside Pakistan. The recommendations of the committee, obtained from the file, are as follows:

6.1: That FIR be lodged against (1) Malik Allah Yar Khan of Kalabagh, (2) Zia Pervez Hussain, (3) and Dr M.A. Khan, and that criminal proceedings be instituted against them for defrauding the government.

6.2: That the amount of $2.168 million be recovered from Malik Allah Yar Khan, Zia Pervez Hussain and Dr M.A. Khan by attaching their properties etc. in Pakistan or abroad for this purpose. FIA may be directed to take steps to recover this money through Interpol, if necessary. Any banker or foreign national involved in this fraud may also be taken to task by the Federal Investigation Agency.

6.3: That since Benazir Bhutto is clearly responsible for this loss to the exchequer as major decisions in respect of this contract were taken with her approval or direction and passed on to Cabinet Division through former PS PM (Ahmad Sadiq), FIR may be registered against her for causing loss to state by misuse of her authority as PM, and criminal proceedings be initiated.

6.4: That since Farooq Leghari knows that his name has visibly come up in this case, and he has tried to plead innocent; and since it is unimaginable that those operating in this scandal could have easy access to the top bureaucrats like Cabinet Secretary, Principal Secretary to the Prime Minister and even to the Prime Minister herself without the backing and active support of the President, FIR against him must also be registered and criminal proceedings initiated.

6.5: That as for the senior civil servants involved in the case, Ahmad Sadiq former PS PM, Humayun Faiz Rasul, and Sahibzada Imtiaz former Cabinet Secretary, no action can be taken against them at this stage as they already stand retired/superannuated.

The case was further referred to the National Accountability Bureau in 2000–02 but no action was taken.

== Western Asia ==
In the largest single payment investigators have uncovered, a gold bullion dealer in Western Asia was alleged to have deposited at least $10 million into one of Zardari's accounts after the Bhutto government gave him a monopoly on gold imports that sustained Pakistan's jewellery industry. The money was allegedly deposited into Zardari's Citibank account in Dubai. Pakistan's Arabian Sea coast, stretching from Karachi to the border with Iran, has long been a gold smugglers' haven. Until the beginning of Bhutto's second term, the trade, running into hundreds of millions of dollars a year, was unregulated, with slivers of gold called biscuits, and larger weights in bullion, carried on planes and boats that travel between the Persian Gulf and the largely unguarded Pakistani coast.

Shortly after Bhutto returned as prime minister in 1993, a Pakistani bullion trader in Dubai, Abdul Razzak Yaqub, proposed a deal: in return for the exclusive right to import gold, Razzak would help the government regularise the trade. In November 1994, Pakistan's Commerce Ministry wrote to Razzak informing him that he had been granted a license that made him, for at least the next two years, Pakistan's sole authorised gold importer. In an interview in his office in Dubai, Razzak acknowledged that he had used the license to import more than $500 million in gold into Pakistan, and that he had travelled to Islamabad several times to meet with Bhutto and Zardari. But he denied that there had been any corruption or secret deals. "I have not paid a single cent to Zardari," he said. Razzak claims that someone in Pakistan who wished to destroy his reputation had contrived to have his company wrongly identified as the depositor. "Somebody in the bank has cooperated with my enemies to make false documents," he said.

Bhutto's niece and others have publicly accused Bhutto of complicity in the killing of her brother Murtaza Bhutto in 1996 by uniformed police officers while she was Prime Minister.

Despite numerous cases and charges of corruption registered against Bhutto by Nawaz Sharif between 1996 and 1999 and Pervez Musharraf from 1999 until 2008, she was yet to be convicted in any case after a lapse of twelve years since their commencement. The cases were withdrawn by the government of Pakistan after the return to power of Pakistan Peoples Party in 2008.
