= Owais Muzaffar =

Pakistani Politician

Owais Muzaffar Tappi اویس مظفر
- Education: Bachelor of Commerce
- Occupations: Politician, Business
- Political party: PPP

Owais Muzaffar (Urdu: اویس مظفر, Sindhi: اویس مظفر), known as Tappi, is the adopted son of Hakim Ali Zardari and the foster-brother of Pakistan's current President Asif Ali Zardari. Owais Muzaffar's biological father worked for Hakim Ali Zardari as manager of Bambino Cinema in Karachi.

In 1995, he was appointed as Deputy District Officer DDO (Revenue) in PCS, Sindh Public Service Commission.

Muzzaffar was considered de facto Chief Minister of Sindh, during the reign of PPP Chief Minister Qaim Ali Shah.

During the Pakistan General Elections 2013, Muzaffar contested for and won the Sindh assembly elections from constituency PS-88 Thatta. He secured 28,593 votes, while his opponent Haji Muhammad Usman Malkani got 20,997.
