= 2018 Minar-e-Pakistan PTI Jalsa =

Pakistani political rally

The 2018 Minar-e-Pakistan PTI Jalsa was one of the major political rallies held by Pakistan Tehreek-e-Insaf during the lead-up to the general elections in July 2018. It was held at Minar e Pakistan, the site where the All-India Muslim League passed the Lahore Resolution (which was later called the Pakistan Resolution). Imran Khan, now a prominent political figure, used this rally for his campaign to lead the country as Prime Minister.

== Background ==
Imran Khan had already achieved significant success in Pakistani politics by 2018. His party, PTI, had gained considerable support in the 2013 elections and continued to grow in influence especially among younger voters and urban middle-class Pakistanis.

The 2018 general election was seen as a critical moment for Pakistan’s political landscape. PTI's main opponents were the PPP, led by Bilawal Bhutto Zardari, and the PML-N, led by Nawaz Sharif. PTI's platform claimed to focus on anti-corruption measures, economic reforms, and promises of a "New Pakistan."

== The Rally ==
The rally at Minar-e-Pakistan took place in the final stretch of the election campaign. Thousands of PTI supporters gathered at the iconic venue, marking a show of unity for the party. Imran Khan delivered a speech, focusing on themes of justice, accountability, and governance reform. He also promised to tackle corruption, introduce economic reforms, and address poverty and unemployment.

== Impact ==
The 2018 rally was part of a broader nationwide campaign that saw PTI garner significant attention and media coverage and reinforced Imran Khan’s position as the most prominent opposition leader in the country.

The campaign was successful, as PTI went on to win the 2018 general election, securing the most seats in the National Assembly. Imran Khan was elected as the 22nd Prime Minister of Pakistan.

The 2018 campaign at Minar-e-Pakistan also cemented the venue's status as a symbol of political change in Pakistan, associated with PTI's rise to power.
