= Aseefa Bhutto Zardari =

Pakistani activist and politician

- آصفہ بھٹو زرداری
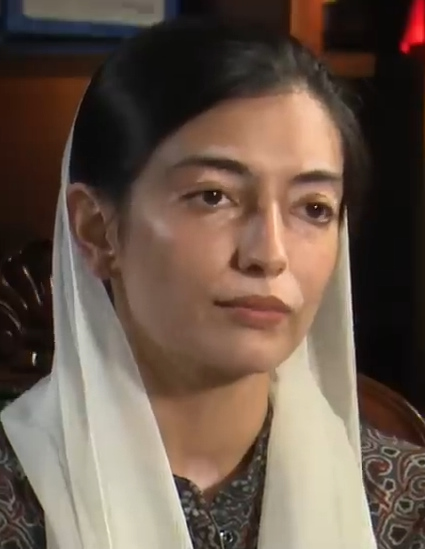
- Aseefa in 2019

First Lady of Pakistan
- Incumbent
- Assumed role 12 March 2024
- President: Asif Ali Zardari
- Preceded by: Samina Alvi

Member of the National Assembly
- Incumbent
- Assumed office 15 April 2024
- Preceded by: Asif Ali Zardari
- Constituency: NA-207 Nawabshah-I

Personal details
- Born: Aseefa Bhutto Zardari; 3 February 1993 (age 33) London, England
- Party: PPP (2020-present)
- Parent(s): Asif Ali Zardari; Benazir Bhutto
- Relatives: Bhutto family; Zardari family
- Education: Oxford Brookes University; University College London; University of Edinburgh

Aseefa Bhutto Zardari (born 3 February 1993) is a Pakistani politician who has served as First Lady of Pakistan since 2024. A member of the National Assembly of Pakistan since 2024, she is the youngest daughter of the current President of Pakistan, Asif Ali Zardari, and former Prime Minister of Pakistan Benazir Bhutto.

== Early life and education ==
Aseefa was born to Asif Ali Zardari, and his wife, Benazir Bhutto, on 3 February 1993 in London. She was the first child in Pakistan to be vaccinated against polio on the country's first National Immunisation Day, after her mother, then Prime Minister Bhutto, launched a major immunization drive in 1994. The Prime Minister personally administered the drops to Aseefa as an endorsement of the campaign.

She is the maternal granddaughter of politicians Zulfiqar Ali Bhutto and Nusrat Ispahani, and the paternal granddaughter of Hakim Ali Zardari. Her maternal uncles were politicians Shahnawaz Bhutto and Murtaza Bhutto, and paternal aunt Azra Fazal Pechuho is a minister in the Sindh Government. She is the first cousin of author Fatima Bhutto and politician Zulfikar Ali Bhutto Jr., and has two older siblings, a brother, politician Bilawal Bhutto Zardari, and a sister, homemaker Bakhtawar Bhutto Zardari.

She earned her bachelor's degree in politics and sociology from Oxford Brookes University and in English literature from the University of Edinburgh, graduating in 2012. She pursued her master's degree in global health and development from University College London in July 2016.

== Political career ==
In October 2009, her father, Asif Ali Zardari who was then the President of Pakistan, appointed Aseefa as a Pakistan's ambassador for the national polio eradication campaign. Her role as polio eradication ambassador in Pakistan has made her a familiar face to the general masses compared to her siblings. During her tenure as an ambassador, Aseefa conducted campaigns to eradicate the disease, engaged with officials, and visited families affected by Polio. In 2013, she was honored with a commemorative plaque by Rotary International for her efforts in the fight against polio.

At the age of 21, she became the youngest Pakistani to address the Oxford Union.

She made her political debut on 30 November 2020, at a rally in Multan. In 2022, during a PPP procession in Khanewal, she suffered minor injuries after being hit by a media drone.

In June 2013, then President Asif Ali Zardari disclosed that his three children, including Aseefa, would lead the PPP once he completed his presidential term on 9 September 2013. Although he mentioned all three of his children, many party leaders believed that Aseefa might take on a more prominent role compared to her elder siblings. There was a perception among them that Zardari considered Aseefa to be more politically astute than Bilawal and Bakhtawar. It was also observed that Aseefa actively engaged in party affairs and was often seen alongside her father, unlike Bilawal, whom Zardari hoped would take on a more active role.

In May 2017, reports emerged indicating that in addition to Bilawal, Aseefa would also enter the electoral race in the 2018 Pakistani general election. Her participation was anticipated due to her active involvement in various social and political debates and issues over time. Ahead of the 2018 election, the PPP suggested Aseefa's name for contesting from either the NA-248 (Karachi West-I) or NA-223 (Matiari) constituency.

During the 2024 Pakistani general election, Aseefa played a pivotal role in the PPP's campaign, leading rallies in support of her brother Bilawal, who was the party's prime ministerial candidate.

On 10 March 2024, following the 2024 Pakistani presidential election, her father Zardari was sworn in as the 14th President of Pakistan. He announced the recognition of Aseefa as the First Lady of Pakistan, marking a significant deviation from his previous presidency (2008–2013), during which the position of the First Lady remained vacant after the assassination of his wife Benazir Bhutto. This decision marked the first time in Pakistan's history that the president's daughter, rather than his spouse, would hold the title of First Lady.

She was sworn in as a member of the National Assembly on 15 April 2024. On 16 April, she was granted the status of the First Lady of Pakistan.

=== Parliamentary career ===
On 17 March 2024, she announced her entry into electoral politics by submitting nomination papers to contest the by-election for the National Assembly seat from constituency NA-207 Nawabshah-I as a candidate of the PPP. This seat became vacant after her father, Asif Ali Zardari, who won the seat in the 2024 election, was elected as President of Pakistan.

A total of eleven candidates submitted nomination papers to contest the by-election in the constituency, with the majority being workers and office bearers of the PPP, who were viewed as covering candidates for Aseefa. On 29 March, she was elected unopposed to the National Assembly from the NA-207 constituency as the nomination papers of other candidates were either withdrawn in her favor or rejected. Pakistan Tehreek-e-Insaf (PTI) claimed that the nomination papers of its candidate, Ghulam Mustafa Rind, were unjustly rejected, followed by his arbitrary arrest by the police. PTI also alleged that Ghulam Mustafa Rind was coerced into withdrawing his nomination.

Subsequently, Ghulam Mustafa Rind lodged a petition with the Sindh High Court (SHC) to contest Aseefa's victory, alleging that despite being a candidate in the election, his nomination papers were unfairly dismissed and that he was unlawfully arrested by the Sakrand police.

In May 2024, her name surfaced in a data leak disclosing her ownership of properties in Dubai. She stated that the asset was legally acquired and already declared to relevant authorities.
