= Contents of the United States diplomatic cables leak (Pakistan) =

Content from the United States diplomatic cables leak has depicted Pakistan and related subjects extensively. The leak, which began on 28 November 2010, occurred when the website of WikiLeaks – an international new media non-profit organisation that publishes submissions of otherwise unavailable documents from anonymous news sources and news leaks – started to publish classified documents of detailed correspondence – diplomatic cables – between the United States Department of State and its diplomatic missions around the world. Since the initial release date, WikiLeaks is releasing further documents every day.

== Security of Pakistan's nuclear weapons programme ==
Grave fears have existed in the U.S. and the U.K. over the security of Pakistan's nuclear weapons programme. Beginning in 2007, the U.S. has mounted a secret effort to remove from a Pakistani research reactor highly enriched uranium that American officials fear could be used as an illicit nuclear device. In the words of U.S. ambassador to Pakistan Anne W. Patterson, Pakistan had refused visits from American nuclear experts, while an official told her "If the local media got word of the fuel removal, they would certainly portray it as the United States taking away Pakistan's nuclear weapons".

In a February 2009 cable from Islamabad, Patterson said "Our major concern is not having an Islamic militant steal an entire weapon but rather the chance someone working in [Pakistani government] facilities could gradually smuggle enough material out to eventually make a weapon." Seven months later, worry was also expressed by British Foreign Office official Mariot Leslie: "The UK has deep concerns about the safety and security of Pakistan's nuclear weapons."

== Pakistan-Arab relations ==
In July 2009, Abu Dhabi Crown Prince Mohammed bin Zayed, Deputy Supreme Commander of the UAE Armed Forces and de facto defence chief, said Zardari was "dirty but not dangerous" and that former prime minister Nawaz Sharif was "dangerous but not dirty -- this is Pakistan".

Saudi King Abdullah called President Asif Ali Zardari of Pakistan the greatest obstacle to the country's progress. "When the head is rotten", he said, "it affects the whole body".

== Government stability ==
The cables reveal that U.S. Vice President Biden told British Prime Minister Gordon Brown in March 2009 that Mr. Zardari had told him he feared an army coup and that the "ISI director and Kayani will take me out".

In a conversation with French Foreign Minister Bernard Kouchner, U.S. Defense Secretary Robert Gates said he found it "astonishing" that President Zardari was still in power in 2010 and that the Pakistani military's operations against militants along the Afghan border had been striking. Kouchner concurred and added that political and military changes in Pakistan were "nothing short of a miracle". Gates and Kouchner also discussed the improving image of the Pakistan Army after its "aggressive campaign against the insurgency".

In February 2010, a Turkish expert on South Asian Affairs, Engin Soysal, told U.S. Undersecretary for Political Affairs William J. Burns that the Pakistani military was unhappy with Zardari, though it was not leaning to intervene. Soysal added that the "senior officers' patience may not be infinite", and that "Zardari needs to increase the democratic legitimacy of parliament".

The Saudi Government is concerned about Pakistan's political fragility, and has worked hard through its embassy in Islamabad, to bring the Pakistani factions together. Saudi relations with Zardari government have been strained because the Saudis do not trust Zardari and see him and other leading Pakistani politicians as corrupt.

Fearing attempts on his life, Zardari told ambassador Anne W. Patterson that in the event he were to be assassinated, he had instructed his son Bilawal Zardari Bhutto (who along with Zardari is the co-Chairman of the ruling Pakistan Peoples Party) to appoint his sister Faryal Talpur as President and he had informed the United Arab Emirates of his intent to allow the family to continue living there.

== Delayed Pakistan-Iran rail link ==
A new rail link between Pakistan and Iran would be delayed for the time being, owing to poor conditions, low freight-carrying capacity and unrest from Baloch insurgents in the Balochistan region of both countries. Likewise, a natural gas pipeline agreement was also not expected to be fruitful because "the Pakistanis don't have the money to pay for either the pipeline, or the gas".

== Pakistan-Israeli relations ==
According to the U.S. embassy in Tel Aviv, Israel was concerned for the well-being of former president Pervez Musharraf and wanted him to stay in power in 2007. The director of Mossad, Meir Dagan, remarked: "...he is facing a serious problem with the militants. Pakistan's nuclear capability could end up in the hands of an Islamic regime".

Israeli Defense Minister Ehud Barak described Pakistan as his "private nightmare". He said that a potential Islamic extremist threat in Pakistan could wake up the world "with everything changed". Barak also dismissed the idea of using force on Iran as backfiring upon moderate Muslims in Pakistan, saying that while the two countries were interconnected, such a causal chain could not be established.

According to a document from October 2009, head of Pakistan's intelligence agency Ahmad Shuja Pasha provided intelligence on potential terrorist attacks in India to Israel. According to the cable, "He had been in direct touch with the Israelis on possible threats against Israeli targets in India".

== Pakistan's allegations of India funding terrorism in Pakistan ==
Pakistani Ambassador to Saudi Arabia Alisherzai blamed India for helping to train and fund extremist groups fighting against the Government of Pakistan. He said that India also helped support the Taliban in Pakistan, explaining "They (India) will never let a chance to harm Pakistan go." Alisherzai summed up his feelings about India by saying, "We are not expecting anything good from them."

== Election ==
In November 2007, Maulana Fazal-ur-Rehman, a politician and leader of Jamiat Ulema-e-Islam, invited Patterson to a dinner in which he sought her support in becoming prime minister and expressed a desire to visit America. According to Rehman's personal aide, "All important parties in Pakistan had to get the approval" of the U.S. Referring to Rehman, Patterson mentioned "He has made it clear that....his still significant number of votes are up for sale". The cables also highlighted the contradictions of other prominent figures. Amin Fahim, a Bhutto follower hoping to run for Prime Minister, led an Islamic religious party "while enjoying an occasional bloody mary".

== Ashfaq Parvez Kayani ==
Kayani is described in American interactions as "direct, frank, and thoughtful" and has "fond memories" of time spent on a military training course in the U.S. He also "smokes heavily and can be difficult to understand as he tends to mumble". ISI chief Ahmad Shuja Pasha was said to be "usually more emotional" than Kayani.

== Prime Minister Gillani ==
In February 2009, Zardari's spokesperson Farahnaz Ispahani said the president was "very unhappy" with the way Prime Minister Gillani had "gone off the reservation" (in relation to Gillani's talks with Shahbaz Sharif that the government would not try to remove the Sharifs from power in Punjab). In 2008, Zardari also commented on Amin Fahim, saying he "had spent most of the election campaign in Dubai (with his latest 22-year-old wife) and was simply too lazy to be prime minister".

== United States combat involvement in Pakistan ==
=== Drone attacks ===
In 2008, Pakistani Prime Minister Yousaf Raza Gillani personally consented American drone strikes in Pakistan's tribal areas along the Afghan border to combat the Taliban. When Interior Minister Rehman Malik recommended the U.S. to hold back "alleged Predator attacks until after the Bajaur operation", Gillani dismissed the remarks and was heard saying: "I don't care if they do it as long as they get the right people. We'll protest in the National Assembly and then ignore it".

=== Special forces ===
There are revelations that small teams of elite U.S. special forces may have been dispatched in the tribal belt to help coordinate the Pakistani military's operations. One record indicates that up to 16 U.S. soldiers had been deployed to help Pakistani troops in 2009. Their role is primarily training-oriented and to provide "intelligence, surveillance and reconnaissance" support – ISR in military jargon – "general operational advice" and set up a live satellite feed from presumably CIA-operated American drones flying overhead.

== Afghanistan-Pakistan affairs ==
Jasmine Zerinini, a French specialist on Afghanistan-Pakistan affairs, said that Pakistan Army Chief General Ashfaq Parvez Kayani had "learnt his lesson from Musharraf" by staying behind the scenes and not interceding in the country's political situation. At the same time, Zerinini claimed that Kayani was manipulating the government into preventing policy change on Pakistan's war-ridden tribal belt and he had a role in provoking controversy surrounding the contentious Kerry-Lugar bill. She also added that the West had not adequately targeted Pakistan's military to take on the Afghan Taliban hiding in Pakistan, saying militant leaders had been allowed to create networks funded by Gulf donors which were difficult to be defeated.
