= Zardari family =

Pakistani political family

Zardari family زرداري خاندان (Sindhi) زرداری خاندان (Urdu)
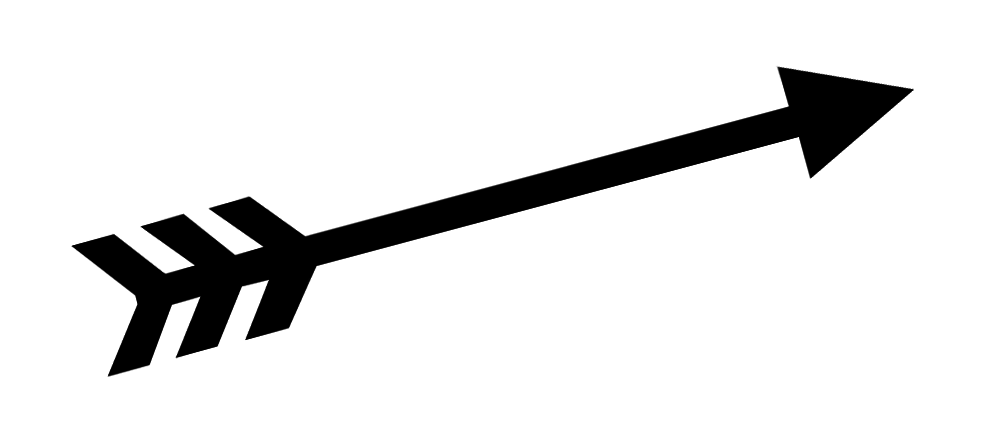
- Electoral symbol of the Zardari–Bhutto-led PPP
- Current region: Karachi, Sindh, Pakistan
- Current head: Asif Ali Zardari
- Members: Hakim Ali Zardari; Bilawal Zardari; Azra Pechuho; Faryal Talpur; Bakhtawar Zardari; Aseefa Zardari
- Connected families: Bhutto family
- Traditions: Shia

The Zardari family (Note: Sindhi: زرداري خاندان; Urdu: زرداری خاندان) is a Pakistani political family of Sindhi–Baloch background which holds chieftaincy of the Zardari tribe. It is connected to the Bhutto family and owns thousands of acres of land in the Sakrand Taluka, Shaheed Benazirabad District, Sindh, especially in the Fatohal Zardari and Balu Ja Quba villages.

== List of family members ==
- Sajwal Khan Zardari, father of Haji Hussain Zardari and grandfather of Hakim Ali Zardari
  - Haji Hussain Zardari, father of Hakim Ali Zardari and son of Sajwal Khan Zardari
    - Hakim Ali Zardari, father of Asif Ali Zardari and son of Haji Hussain Zardari
      - Asif Ali Zardari, the patriarch of Zardari family, son of Hakim Ali Zardari and husband of Benazir Bhutto
        - Bilawal Bhutto Zardari, son of Benazir Bhutto and Asif Ali Zardari
        - Bakhtawar Bhutto Zardari, daughter of Benazir Bhutto and Asif Ali Zardari
        - Aseefa Bhutto Zardari, daughter of Benazir Bhutto and Asif Ali Zardari
      - Azra Pechuho, daughter of Hakim Ali Zardari
        - Muhammad Pechuho, son of Azra Peechoho
      - Faryal Talpur, daughter of Hakim Ali Zardari, and wife of Mir Munawar Ali Talpur

== See also ==
- Bhutto family
- Zardari tribe
- Zardari (disambiguation)
