= NA-207 Nawabshah-I =

Constituency of the National Assembly of Pakistan

- Constituency for the National Assembly of Pakistan
- Region: Nawabshah Tehsil and Daur Tehsil (partly) of Nawabshah District
- Electorate: 496,037

Current constituency
- Party: Pakistan People’s Party Parliamentarians
- Member(s): Aseefa Bhutto Zardari
- Created from: NA-213 Nawabshah-I

NA-207 Nawabshah-I (این اے-207، نوابشاه-۱) is a constituency for the National Assembly of Pakistan.

== Assembly Segments ==
| Constituency number | Constituency | District | Current MPA | Party |
|---|---|---|---|---|
| 36 | PS-36 Shaheed Benazirabad-I | Shaheed Benazirabad District | Azra Fazal Pechuho | PPP |
| 37 | PS-37 Shaheed Benazirabad-II | Shaheed Benazirabad District | Chaudhary Javed Iqbal Arain | PPP |

== Election 2002 ==
General elections were held on 10 October 2002. Dr. Azra Fazal Pechuho of PPP won by 75,237 votes.

General election 2002: NA-213 Nawabshah-I
| Party | Candidate | Votes | % | ±% |
|---|---|---|---|---|
| PPP | Dr. Azra Fazal Pecheho | 75,237 | 58.20 | |
| PML(Q) | Syed Zahid Hussain Shah | 28,824 | 22.30 | |
| MQM | Ghulam Hyder Rahu | 20,877 | 16.15 | |
| Others | Others (nine candidates) | 4,332 | 3.35 | |
| Turnout | | 132,453 | 40.06 | |
| Total valid votes | | 129,270 | 97.60 | |
| Rejected ballots | | 3,183 | 2.40 | |
| Majority | | 46,413 | 35.90 | |
| Registered electors | | 330,639 | | |

== Election 2008 ==
General elections were held on 18 February 2008. Dr. Azra Fazal Pechuho of PPP won by 108,404 votes.

General election 2008: NA-213 Nawabshah-I
| Party | Candidate | Votes | % | ±% |
|---|---|---|---|---|
| PPP | Dr. Azra Fazal Pecheho | 108,404 | 66.84 | |
| PML(F) | Syed Zahid Hussain Shah | 47,127 | 29.06 | |
| Others | Others (eleven candidates) | 6,665 | 4.10 | |
| Turnout | | 167,003 | 47.68 | |
| Total valid votes | | 162,196 | 97.12 | |
| Rejected ballots | | 4,807 | 2.88 | |
| Majority | | 61,277 | 37.78 | |
| Registered electors | | 350,280 | | |
| PPP hold | | | | |

== Election 2013 ==
General elections were held on 11 May 2013. Dr. Azra Fazal Pechuho of PPP won by 113,199 votes and became the member of National Assembly.

General election 2013: NA-213 Nawabshah-I
| Party | Candidate | Votes | % | ±% |
|---|---|---|---|---|
| PPP | Dr. Azra Fazal Pecheho | 113,199 | 56.83 | |
| MQM | Inayat Ali Rind | 33,874 | 17.01 | |
| PML(F) | Syed Zahid Hussain Shah | 25,223 | 12.66 | |
| Independent | Sardar Sher Muhammad Rind | 16,485 | 8.28 | |
| Others | Others (twenty seven candidates) | 10,401 | 5.22 | |
| Turnout | | 205,226 | 54.81 | |
| Total valid votes | | 199,182 | 97.06 | |
| Rejected ballots | | 6,044 | 2.94 | |
| Majority | | 79,325 | 39.82 | |
| Registered electors | | 374,425 | | |
| PPP hold | | | | |

== Election 2018 ==
General elections are scheduled to be held on 25 July 2018.

General election 2018: NA-213 Nawabshah-I
| Party | Candidate | Votes | % | ±% |
|---|---|---|---|---|
| PPP | Asif Ali Zardari | 101,370 | 53.91 | |
| GDA | Sardar Sher Muhammad Rind Baloch | 54,346 | 28.90 | |
| PML(N) | Syed Ghulam Mohyuddin Shah | 7,803 | 4.15 | |
| PTI | Farooq Ahmed Chandio | 5,075 | 2.70 | |
| MMA | Zakir Hussain Jamali | 4,434 | 2.36 | |
| Others | Others (twelve candidates) | 14,996 | 7.98 | |
| Turnout | | 196,261 | 46.87 | |
| Total valid votes | | 188,024 | 95.80 | |
| Rejected ballots | | 8,237 | 4.20 | |
| Majority | | 47,024 | 25.01 | |
| Registered electors | | 418,775 | | |
| PPP hold | | | | |

== Election 2024 ==
General elections were held on 8 February 2024. Asif Ali Zardari won the election, but later vacated the seat to become the President of Pakistan.

General election 2024: NA-207 Nawabshah-I
| Party | Candidate | Votes | % | ±% |
|---|---|---|---|---|
| PPP | Asif Ali Zardari | 147,465 | 68.52 | ▲14.61 |
| PTI | Sardar Sher Muhammad Rind Baloch (Note: Filed nomination papers as PTI candidate but ECP allowed him to run as an Independent) | 51,925 | 24.13 | ▲21.43 |
| TLP | Saeed Ahmed | 7,633 | 3.55 | ▲1.29 |
| Others | Others (ten candidates) | 8,188 | 3.80 | |
| Turnout | | 221,418 | 44.64 | ▼2.23 |
| Total valid votes | | 215,211 | 97.20 | |
| Rejected ballots | | 6,207 | 2.80 | |
| Majority | | 95,540 | 44.39 | ▲19.38 |
| Registered electors | | 496,037 | | |
| PPP hold | | | | |

== By-election 2024 ==
A by-election was to be held on 21 April 2024. However, Aseefa Bhutto Zardari won the election unopposed after all other candidates withdrew their nomination papers.

== See also ==
- NA-206 Naushahro Feroze-II
- NA-208 Nawabshah-II
