= Bambino Cinema =

Cinema in Karachi, Pakistan

- بیمبینو سنیما
- Interactive map of the Bambino Cinema area

General information
- Type: Movie theatre
- Location: Saddar, Karachi, Pakistan
- Coordinates: 24°51′51″N 67°01′31″E
- Opened: 1968
- Owner: Sheikh Kashif Imtiaz

Design and construction
- Architects: Naqvi & Siddiqui Associates

The Bambino Cinema, is located in Saddar area of Karachi.

== History ==
The Bambino Cinema was built in the 1960s as the first cinema in Pakistan with a double balcony seating and 70 mm film screen and projection equipment. It was inaugurated by President Ayub Khan in 1968.

During the 1970s, when the Pakistani film industry was in its boom, a mini-cinema Scala was built on its first floor. The cinema is also famous because it was built by Hakim Ali Zardari, father of Pakistani president Asif Ali Zardari, who sold it later.

== See also ==
- Movie theater
- Cinema of Pakistan
