= Bilawal Bhutto Zardari =

Pakistani politician (born 1988)

Bilawal Bhutto Zardari NI(C)
- بلاول بھٹو زرداری
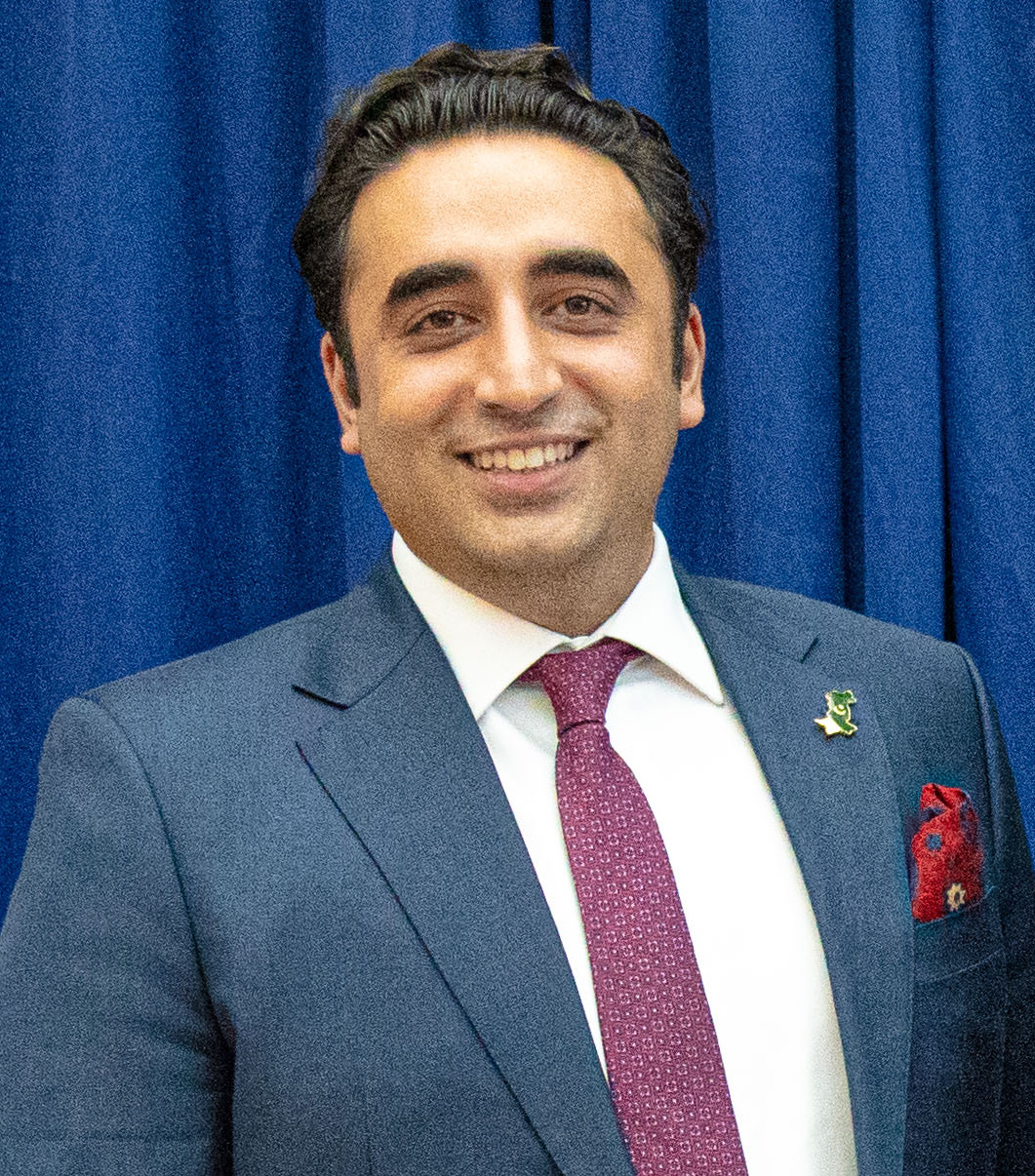
- Bilawal in 2022

Chairman of the Pakistan People's Party
- Incumbent
- Assumed office 30 December 2007
- Deputy: Asif Ali Zardari (co-chairperson)
- Preceded by: Benazir Bhutto

37th Minister of Foreign Affairs
- In office 27 April 2022 – 10 August 2023
- President: Arif Alvi
- Prime Minister: Shahbaz Sharif
- Deputy: Hina Rabbani Khar (as Minister of State)
- Preceded by: Shah Mahmood Qureshi
- Succeeded by: Jalil Abbas Jilani

Member of the National Assembly
- Incumbent
- Assumed office 29 February 2024
- Constituency: NA-194 Larkana-I
- Majority: 135,112 votes
- In office 13 August 2018 – 10 August 2023
- Constituency: NA-200 Larkana
- Majority: 34,226 (22.46%)

Member of Judicial Commission of Pakistan
- Incumbent
- Assumed office 9 October 2026

Personal details
- Born: Bilawal Bhutto Zardari; 21 September 1988 (age 38) Karachi, Sindh, Pakistan
- Party: Pakistan People's Party
- Parent(s): Asif Ali Zardari; Benazir Bhutto
- Relatives: Bhutto family; Zardari family
- Education: Christ Church, Oxford (MA)
- Awards: Nishan-e-Imtiaz

Bilawal Bhutto Zardari (Note: Urdu: بلاول بھٹو زرداری; Sindhi: بلاول ڀٽو زرداري) (born 21 September 1988) is a Pakistani politician who served as the 37th Minister of Foreign Affairs from 2022 to 2023. He became the chairman of the Pakistan People's Party in 2007 following his mother's assassination.

Born in Karachi, Sindh, Bilawal maternally belongs to the Bhutto family and paternally to the Zardari family, he is the son of former Prime Minister Benazir Bhutto and President Asif Ali Zardari, and the grandson of former President Zulfikar Ali Bhutto.

Bhutto Zardari was a member of the National Assembly of Pakistan from 2018 to 2023. He was re-elected as a Member of the National Assembly of Pakistan in the 2024 Pakistani general election from newly formed constituency NA-194 Larkana-I, taking oath in 2024.

Chief Justice of Pakistan Justice Yahya Afridi appointed him as a member of the Judicial Commission of Pakistan on 9 October 2026.

== Early life and education ==
Bilawal Bhutto Zardari was born at the Lady Dufferin Hospital in Karachi, Sindh, on 21 September 1988 to Benazir Bhutto, who served as the Prime Minister of Pakistan on two occasions, and her husband, Asif Ali Zardari, who is the incumbent President of Pakistan. He is the maternal grandson of former President and Prime Minister of Pakistan, Zulfikar Ali Bhutto, and his wife Nusrat Bhutto. His paternal grandfather, Hakim Ali Zardari, was a politician and a member of the National Assembly of Pakistan. From his mother's side, he is the nephew of politicians Murtaza Bhutto and Shahnawaz Bhutto, and from his father's side, his aunts are politicians Azra Peechoho and Faryal Talpur. Politician Ghinwa Bhutto is his aunt by marriage. Author Fatima Bhutto and San Francisco based artist Zulfikar Ali Bhutto Jr are his maternal cousins.

He is of Sindhi and Kurdish descent on his maternal side and Baloch descent on his paternal side.

For early education, Bhutto Zardari attended Karachi Grammar School and Froebel's International School in Islamabad before going into exile to Dubai in 1999 along with his mother. In Dubai, he attended the Rashid School For Boys. For further studies, he followed in the footsteps of both his mother and his grandfather and applied to Oxford University, where he was accepted to study Modern History and Politics at Christ Church, receiving his Bachelor of Arts degree in 2012 (later promoted to a Master of Arts by seniority).

== Early political career (2007–2018) ==
Bhutto Zardari was appointed as the Chairman of the Pakistan Peoples Party (PPP), on 30 December 2007 at the age of 19, following the assassination of his mother in Rawalpindi earlier that month during a political rally. On this occasion, he recalled his martyred mother, "My mother always said that democracy is the best revenge".

In the 2018 Pakistani general election, the PPP, under the leadership of Bhutto Zardari, emerged as the largest party in Sindh and third largest party of Pakistan. The party won 43 seats in the National Assembly, nine more seats than in the 2013 general election. Bhutto Zardari, contested from NA-246 Karachi West-III, Malakand NA-8, as well as NA-200 Larkana. He won from Larkana with 84,426 votes, having lost from two of the other constituencies to candidates for the Imran Khan-founded Pakistan Tehreek-e-Insaf (PTI). Bhutto Zardari claimed that rigging took place before and after the general election, adding that across Pakistan polling agents were expelled from the polling stations and demanding a probe into rigging allegations.

== Member of the National Assembly (2018–2023) ==
On 13 August 2018, Bhutto Zardari became a member of the National Assembly of Pakistan. In his inaugural speech, he asked Prime Minister Imran Khan to fulfill his promise of rooting out corruption, resolving the water crisis, providing 10 million jobs, and providing 5 million houses to the Pakistani people during his tenure. In the speech, Bhutto Zardari coined the term 'PM Select' for Khan. He added that Khan is not only the prime minister for the PTI, but he is also the Prime Minister of the Pakistani people, who Bhutto Zardari claimed that Khan referred to as "donkeys" and "living corpses."

On 5 March 2019, Bhutto Zardari was elected—unopposed—as the chairperson of the National Assembly Standing Committee for Human Rights.

== Foreign Minister (2022–2023) ==
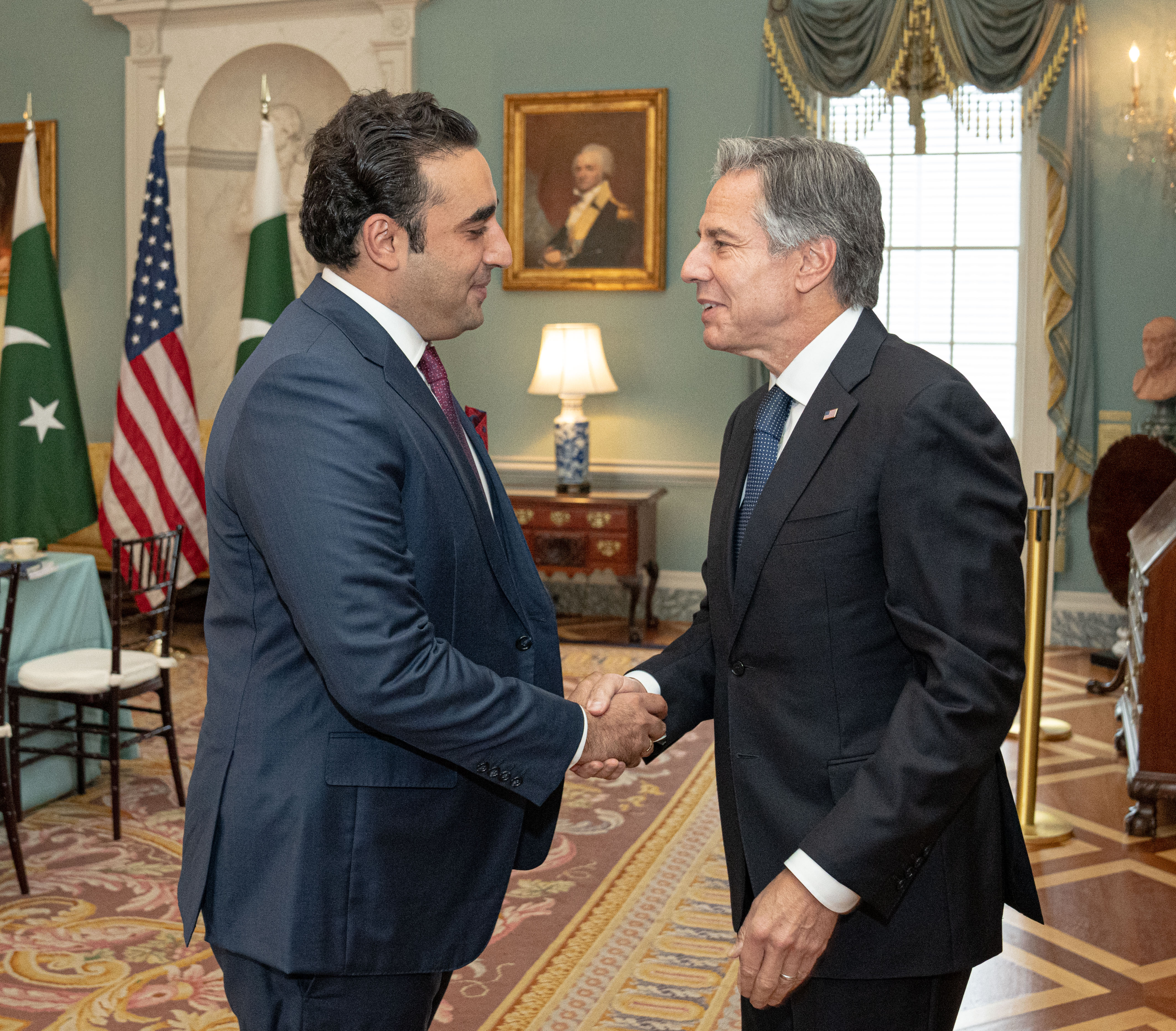
Bhutto Zardari with U.S. Secretary of State Antony Blinken in Washington, D.C., September 2022

On 27 April 2022, Bhutto Zardari was sworn in as Foreign Minister of Pakistan under Prime Minister Shehbaz Sharif following the removal of Imran Khan from the premiership amidst a constitutional crisis. President Arif Alvi administered his oath of office. At 33 years old, he became the youngest foreign minister in Pakistan's history.

Upon assuming office, Bhutto Zardari outlined a foreign policy centred on “peace through dialogue,” economic diplomacy, and the revitalisation of Pakistan’s global image. During his first month in office, he visited China to discuss the advancement China–Pakistan Economic Corridor, and he met with his counterpart, Wang Yi. In September 2022, he visited the United States and met with U.S. Secretary of State Antony Blinken in Washington, D.C. to commemorate the 70th anniversary of Pakistan-U.S. diplomatic relations.

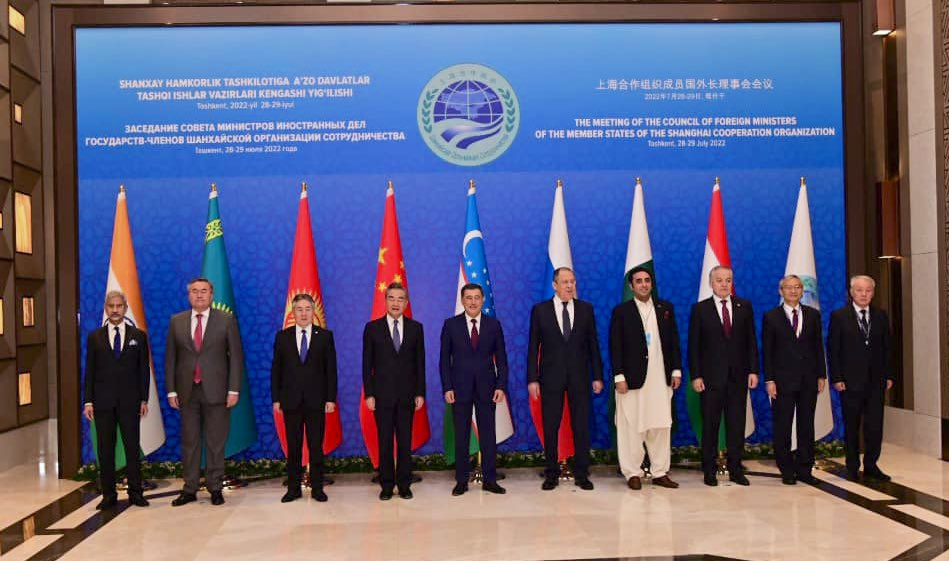
Bhutto Zardari at the Shanghai Cooperation Organisation foreign ministers summit in Goa, July 2022

Bhutto Zardari emerged as a vocal advocate for climate justice after the 2022 floods devastated large parts of Pakistan. He played a key role at the United Nations Climate Change Conference in Egypt in November 2022, serving as chair of the Group of 77 and China delegation during the conference.

In May 2023, Bhutto Zardari visited India to attend the Shanghai Cooperation Organisation Council of Foreign Ministers meeting in Goa—the first official visit by a Pakistani foreign minister to India in over a decade. His participation was seen as a symbolic gesture towards regional dialogue despite tensions over the disputed region of Kashmir and terrorism. He met with his Indian counterpart S. Jaishankar at the beginning of the conference, exchanging a namaste; however, no bilateral meetings between the two occurred.

In August 2023, Bhutto Zardari launched a “Change Management Initiative” within the Ministry of Foreign Affairs, introducing a digital repository to modernise Pakistan’s diplomatic service.

Bhutto Zardari's term ended with the dissolution of the National Assembly in August 2023 ahead of the next general election.

== 2024 premiership campaign ==
Bhutto Zardari during the PPP's 2024 general election campaign

In January 2024, The PPP published its electoral manifesto for the upcoming general elections the following month, with Bhutto Zardari serving as the party's candidate for prime minister. Bhutto Zardari promised to bring a "transformational change" by addressing several issues, including water and food insecurity, and the country's economic woes. His campaign also relied on youth appeal, with Bhutto Zardari championing the fight against climate change to rally Pakistan's youth. Ahead of the general elections, Bhutto Zardari toured all four provinces in January, with his sister, Aseefa Bhutto Zardari, assisting his campaign.

Following the election, which produced a hung parliament, Bhutto Zardari announced his withdrawal from the race and that the PPP would not participate in any post-election federal cabinet. On 13 February, Bhutto Zardari's father, Asif Ali Zardari, who was representing the PPP, announced that a coalition government would be formed, with Shehbaz Sharif as the Prime Minister. Bhutto Zardari added that the PPP would nominate Zardari to become the next president, while it would also field candidates for the Senate chairmanship and the speakership of the National Assembly.

== Member of the National Assembly (2024–present) ==
In the aftermath of the 2024 general elections, Bhutto Zardari resumed his membership of the National Assembly, representing NA-194 Larkana-I. He took his oath on 29 February. In September 2024, he advised the speaker of the house to form a committee to "restore the functionality of the house," advocating for an end to political rivalries, with a greater priority on national interests.

In October 2024, Bhutto Zardari expressed his support for the Twenty-sixth Amendment to the Constitution of Pakistan, which places limitations on the Supreme Court of Pakistan through the removal of the sua sponte prerogative, the reconstitution of the Judicial Commission of Pakistan (JCP) to sit on judicial appointments, and the formation of a separate constitutional bench in the Supreme Court.

In June 2025, Prime Minister Shehbaz Sharif appointed Bhutto Zardari as the head of a Pakistani delegation to tour several countries and provide Pakistan's perspective on its recent conflict with India.

== Political activism ==
=== Support for 18th Amendment ===
Bhutto Zardari has repeatedly criticized the historical One Unit Scheme, and warned against any attempt to bring in a presidential system, explaining that it will not be in the interest of democracy. During a press conference on 27 April 2019, he stated that the "presidential system is neither in the interest of the country nor the federation and all democratic forces will resist any such move."

=== Freedom of expression ===
A devout advocate for democracy, Bhutto Zardari has repeatedly denounced censorship and likened any forms of curbing media freedom to living under a dictatorship. He made a speech at the Karachi Press Club on World Press Freedom Day where he said, "An undeclared censorship is stifling the freedom of expression in Pakistan and journalists are coming under threat from state and non-state actors." He added, "Journalists and media persons as human rights defenders suffer the most when freedom of expression is stifled. After the right to life, the most important right is the right of expression and the freedom of association because all other rights cannot even be articulated without it."

During the speech, he also criticized the Prevention of Electronic Crime Act 2016 and stated that it had been misapplied to stifle dissent.

=== Women's rights ===
Bhutto Zardari is a strong advocate of "peaceful, progressive, prosperous, democratic Pakistan", what he calls his mother's vision. In an interview with the BBC, he said that his 2018 election campaign was to implement these principles. He is a strong supporter of women's empowerment and believes in empowering women and taking them on board in all matters is the sole guarantee of the country's progress.

On the occasion of International Day of the Girl Child, the PPP chairman said that a future based on progress and prosperity could remain a dream without empowering girls and taking them on board in all matters. Bhutto Zardari acknowledged all those women who stepped forward in all sections of life and field while defeating many impediments at every level and social taboos. He specifically named Fatima Jinnah, Benazir Bhutto, Asma Jehangir, and Maryam Mukhtar.

On 17 March 2019, Bhutto Zardari met with a delegation of women's rights activists led by Sheema Kirmani and assured his support for their cause. A statement released by Bhutto Zardari House later said that his party would not tolerate any offence against the struggle for gender equality and women's rights. The statement went further to read, "The PPP chairman extended his enduring support to the members of the Aurat March and its activists who are struggling for their genuine and legitimate rights as enshrined in the unanimous constitution of Pakistan."

Bhutto Zardari has also advocated for the abolishment of child marriages in Pakistan. The Sindh government under PPP abolished child marriages by making the legal marriage age eighteen years in the province under the Sindh Child Marriages Restraint Act, 2013. He as a member of the opposition in the National Assembly has also advocated that the legal marriage age should be made eighteen years across the country. On 4 May 2019 he tweeted, "UAE marriage age is 18, Indonesia is 18, and Turkey is also 18. Are they not Muslim countries? In Sindh where marriage age is 18, we saw how law stopped an adult marrying a 10-year-old! Every 20 minutes a girl dies in Pakistan as a result of underage pregnancy.

=== Civil rights ===
Bhutto Zardari has repeatedly defended the rights of minorities in Pakistan. On 4 December 2012, in a statement responding to reports about the demolition of a Hindu temple in Karachi and a desecration of an Ahmadiyya graveyard in Lahore he said, "Our forefathers did not sacrifice their lives for an intolerant, extremist, sectarian, and authoritarian Pakistan. I appeal to all of you to rise up and defend Jinnah's Pakistan. My party and I will stand by you, shoulder to shoulder."

During a cake cutting ceremony for Christmas in Karachi, on 25 December 2018, Bhutto Zardari said that he PPP is the custodian of social justice, parity, religious, and interfaith harmony in the country and its advocacy for the prevalence of peace and tranquility across the world is heavily established.

At the memorial for the 7th death anniversary of former Federal Minister of Interfaith Harmony, Shahbaz Bhatti on 3 March 2018, Bhutto Zardari said, "May I take this opportunity to say that we share the concerns over the misuse of blasphemy laws. This is the concern of not only the Christian community but of all of us. It is my concern too. These laws have been used as a tool by extremists to settle personal scores. They have been used to grab the properties of Christians and other non-Muslims. The blasphemy laws carry the mandatory death penalty. We must prevent their misuse. We will."

On 29 September 2019, he visited the Hindus in Ghotki and the Sacho Satram Dham temple which was desecrated in the 2019 Ghotki riots and condemned the attack.

=== Climate change ===
Bhutto Zardari has proposed a plan to "completely restructure Pakistan's economic development model, putting the threat of climate change front and centre." His party's election manifesto aims to ensure that funds exceeding $10 billion are directed to fighting climate change, in the wake of the 2022 Pakistan floods that displaced more than 7 million people.

=== Foreign policy ===
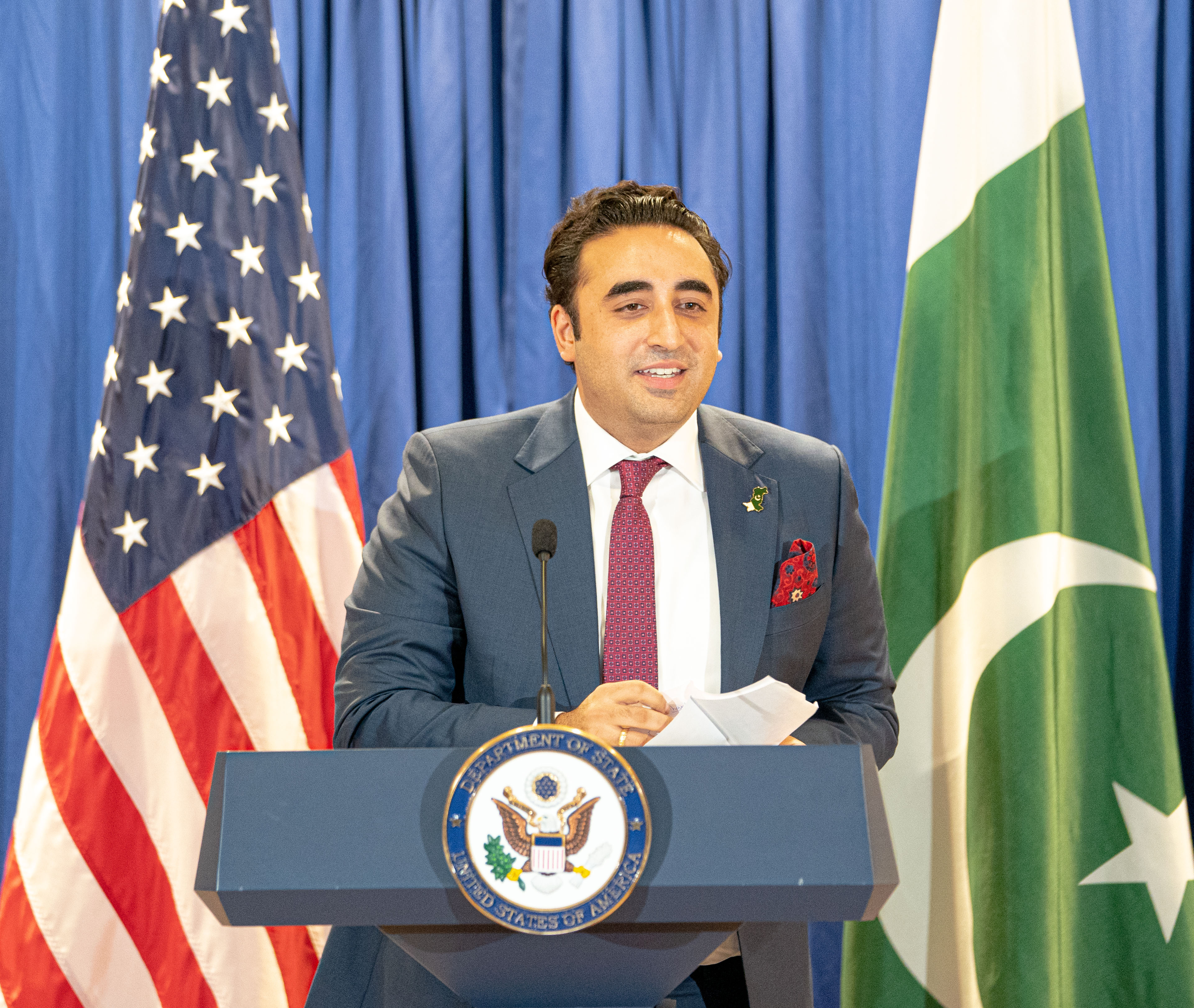
In 2022, Bhutto Zardari told U.S. diplomats that Pakistan did not want to become a "geopolitical football" in the strategic competition between the United States and China.

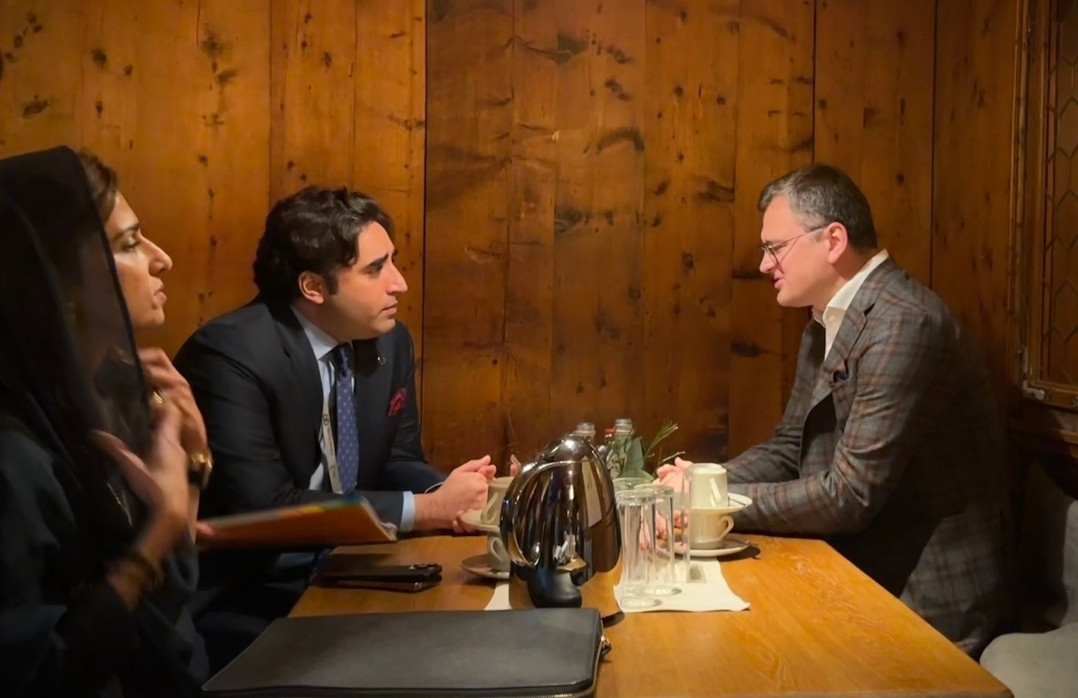
Bhutto Zardari and Dmytro Kuleba at the 59th Munich Security Conference in 2023

On 20 September 2014, while speaking to party workers in Multan, Bhutto Zardari said, "I will take back Kashmir, all of it, and I will not leave behind a single inch of it because, like the other provinces, it belongs to Pakistan." The statement was to be the first marking his stance on the Kashmir issue and remarked upon widely in local and international media.

On 6 February 2019, Bhutto Zardari met with the Kashmir Council in Washington to express solidarity with the people of Kashmir. During the meeting, he assured the delegation that he would continue to raise his voice against the brutalities of Indian forces against innocent and unarmed Kashmiri people at every available forum both nationally and internationally. He said that loyalty to the cause of Kashmir was in his blood and he would stand with the people of Indian-administered Kashmir in their just struggle for the right to self-determination and freedom from illegal and immoral Indian occupation.

On 15 October 2022, after U.S. President Joe Biden referred to Pakistan as "one of the most dangerous nations in the world" and as a carrier of "nuclear weapons without any cohesion" at a Democratic Party fundraiser in California, Bhutto Zardari summoned American diplomat Donald Blome to the Ministry of Foreign Affairs and demanded an explanation as well as called for an official démarche.

In June 2025, two months after India suspended the Indus Water Treaty over Pakistan's alleged "cross border linkages" to the Pahalgam Attack, Bhutto Zardari threatened war with India stating that "either India shares water fairly or we will secure it from ‘all 6 rivers.’" In August, at a function organized by the Culture Department of the Sindh government, Bhutto Zardari once again raised the prospect of war with India, citing escalating tensions over the Treaty. He warned that if India continued actions perceived as "violations of the treaty", Pakistan would be compelled to consider all options, including military action. He stated that the people of Pakistan were "strong enough" to wage war in order to "reclaim all six rivers".

=== Terrorism ===
On 18 February 2018, while addressing a function in Washington, Bhutto Zardari said that there is a growing increase in terrorism in Pakistan and that democracy can win over extremism, but the biggest battle is of ideologies. "The battle is between modernity and extremism."

Bhutto Zardari has also repeatedly criticized the government's resistance to implementing the National Action Plan, which he deems resistance to democracy and peace in the nation. He has also demanded the removal of three federal ministers accusing them of having connections with banned militant outfits. On 7 March 2019, during a provincial council meeting, Bhutto Zardari said, "I demand a joint parliamentary committee for implementation of National Action Plan and removal of all three federal ministers for their connection with extremist organisations. If our demands are not met, we will not support the government anymore."

In a 2025 interview with Al Jazeera, Bhutto Zardari stated that Pakistan had no objection to extraditing individuals such as Hafiz Saeed and Masood Azhar to India as a confidence-building measure, provided New Delhi showed willingness to cooperate. He claimed Pakistan was ready to extradite "individuals of concern" as part of a broader dialogue on terrorism, but simultaneously cited legal and procedural obstacles. Despite both Saeed and Azhar being proscribed under Pakistan’s National Counter Terrorism Authority (NACTA), Bhutto Zardari argued that prosecuting them for cross-border terrorism was difficult. He further dismissed India's firm stance on pursuing terrorists as a “new abnormal,” stating it did not serve the interests of either country. Bhutto Zardari faced strong criticism from the Pakistan Tehreek-e-Insaf (PTI) following his remarks suggesting that Pakistan could extradite “individuals of concern” to India as a confidence-building measure. PTI Central Information Secretary Sheikh Waqas Akram condemned the statement as undermining national security and appeasing a "hostile neighbour", calling him an “immature political child” and accusing him of lacking understanding of regional geopolitics. Akram argued that such proposals compromised Pakistan’s sovereignty and contradicted the legacy of the Pakistan Peoples Party, particularly on the Kashmir issue. He further criticized Bhutto Zardari’s political credibility and called for a leadership change within the party. Talha Saeed, son of Hafiz Saeed, condemned Bhutto Zardari remarks on the possible extradition of Pakistani citizens to India, calling them contrary to state policy and national interest, and defended his father by asserting that none of his actions were against Pakistan.

== Notes ==
Party political offices
Preceded by Benazir Bhutto	Chairman of the Pakistan People's Party; 2007–present Served alongside: Asif Ali Zardari	Incumbent
National Assembly of Pakistan
New constituency	Member of the National Assembly for NA-200 (Larkana-I); 2018–2023	Incumbent
Political offices
Preceded by Shah Mahmood Qureshi	Minister of Foreign Affairs; 2022–2023	Incumbent
