= Zardari (tribe) =

Baloch tribe in Pakistan

Zardari is a Baloch tribe native to the Balochistan and Sindh provinces of Pakistan. One of the several Baloch tribes in Sindh, the family is of Rind origin and owns thousands of acres of land in Shaheed Benazirabad District.

== History ==
The Zardaris have their origin as one of the several Baloch tribes in the Derajat region that migrated to various regions of Sindh during the time of the Kalhora dynasty. The family is said to be named after Sardar Khan, a tribesman of the Rind clan of Balochis, who was renamed 'Zardar Khan' by Mian Nasir Muhammad Kalhoro. Zardar was born in 1640 and died in Khudabad in 1715 and was buried at the Garhi town in Dadu. The town was later destroyed in 1780 by the Mughal army.

Zardar Khan had several sons, including Marko Khan. The latter had a son named Mir Khan whose son Bilawal Faqir was said to be a pious Sunni Muslim who died while fighting against the invading Iranian army of Nadir Shah. Faqir's Sufi shrine is located at Baloo Ja Quba near Nawabshah. After his death, most of the Zardaris migrated to what is now known as Fatohal Zardari. Bilawal Faqir's son Sardar Khan and grandson Dilawar Khan Zardari also died while fighting on the battlefield. Dilawar Khan had a son named Murad Khan Zardari who had a son named Allah Bakhsh Zardari. The latter was the father of Sajawal Khan Zardari, father of Muhammad Hussain Zardari, father of Hakim Ali Zardari, patriarch of the politically influential Zardari family.
