= Hakim Ali Zardari =

Pakistani politician

Member of the National Assembly of Pakistan
- In office 1972–1977
- In office 1988–1990
- In office 1993–1996

Personal details
- Born: 9 December 1930 Nawabshah, Bombay Presidency, British India
- Died: 24 May 2011 (aged 80) Islamabad, Pakistan
- Resting place: Nawabshah, Sindh, Pakistan
- Party: Pakistan Peoples Party
- Other political affiliations: National Democratic Party
- Spouse(s): Bilquis Sultana; Zareen Ara
- Relations: Zulfiqar Ali Bukhari (father-in-law)
- Children: Asif Ali Zardari (son); Faryal Talpur (daughter); Azra Peechoho (daughter); Fauzia Abbasi (daughter)
- Profession: Businessman; Agriculturist; Film distributor Film producer

Hakim Ali Zardari (Note: Urdu: حاکم علی زرداری) (9 December 1930 – 24 May 2011) was a Pakistani politician who served as a member of National Assembly of Pakistan from 1972 to 1977,1988 to 1990 and then again from 1993 to 1996.

He was also a landlord, a businessman and a personality associated with the film industry, both in Sindhi and in Urdu, having been a film distributor as well a film producer.

== Early life and education ==
He was born on 9 December 1930 in the village of Fatohal Zardari to Mohammad Hussain Zardari. His father's family was from the Zardari tribe of Baluchistan and was recruited by the British to be zamindars in Sindh. His mother was originally from Iraq. He received his initial education from mosque school and completed his matriculation from DC High School in Nawabshah.

== Political career ==
Zardari started his political career in 1965 when he was elected member of the Nawabshah District Council and later was elected as the Mayor of District Nawabshah. He supported Fatima Jinnah in the 1965 presidential elections against Ayub Khan.

In 1970, he joined the Pakistan Peoples Party as a founding member. He also got elected head of the Zardari tribe in 1970.

He was elected to the National Assembly of Pakistan in 1970, 1988, and 1993. During the first Benazir Bhutto ministry, he served as the chairman of the Public Accounts Committee, amid criticism of corruption and nepotism from the opposition party. In 1990, he was implicated in a scandal involving a luxury hotel and golf course project on a 287-acre forested area in Islamabad, marred by corruption and nepotism allegations. Valued between $15 million and $30 million, the land was allocated for just $930,000 to a company linked to a London residential address, raising concerns over its significant undervaluation. The controversy, intensified by a lawsuit from opposition leaders against him and Asif Ali Zardari, led to political turmoil and halted the project's completion.

He was imprisoned during the tenures of Nawaz Sharif and Pervaiz Musharraf and was implicated with his son for the murder of Federal Secretary Alam Baloch.

== Business career and wealth ==
He built cinema houses in Hyderabad and Karachi and worked as a film distributor. He also produced a Sindhi film, Soorat.

He had a house in Normandy, France which he was accused of buying for 2.5 million dollars by the National Accountability Bureau, which filed a reference against him for having assets beyond source of income and was sentenced for five years of rigorous imprisonment, a fine of 18.5 million rupees and disqualified him from holding any elected office for 10 years. On health ground his house was declared as sub-jail.

On 24 January 2007, Sindh High Court overturned his conviction made by the accountability bureau.

He was also convicted in similar case in Lahore for making shady transactions with various organisations for establishing a tourist village at Rawalpindi National Park through Zardari Group. He was sentenced to 18 months in jail and asked to pay a fine of 20 million rupees but this was also overturned by Lahore High Court in 2002.

== Personal life ==
He married twice—Bilquis Sultana (died November 2002) and Zareen Ara (died 22 June 2022)—and had four children from Bilquis—Asif Ali Zardari, Fouzia Abbasi, Azra Peechoho and Faryal Talpur. He also had an adopted son Owais Muzaffar Tappi.

He had no children from his second marriage with Zareen Ara Bukhari, who was the first Pakistani woman to earn a PhD in English literature from Cambridge University. She was also known in literary circles, being the daughter of Zulfiqar Ali Bukhari, a writer, music composer and the first director-general of Radio Pakistan, and the niece of Patras Bokhari, one of the best-known writers of the country. Zardari proposed to her while he was producing the movie Dhoop Aur Saye (1968).

== Death ==
Hakim Ali Zardari was admitted to the Pakistan Institute of Medical Sciences (PIMS) in March following multiple organ failure. He died in the hospital on 24 May 2011 at age 80.
