= List of mausolea and shrines in Pakistan =

Pakistan has a number of shrines that have become places of pilgrimage. They include mausolea and shrines of political leaders (of both pre-independence and post-independence Pakistan), shrines of religious leaders and pirs (saints) and shrines of leaders of various Islamic empires and dynasties.

== Founding fathers ==
- The mausoleum of Quaid-e-Azam Muhammad Ali Jinnah ('Father of the Nation' and 'Quaid-e-Azam') in Karachi
- The mausoleum of Allama Muhammad Iqbal ('Poet of the Nation') in Lahore

== Venerated figures in Sufism ==
Shrine of	Affiliation/Sufi Order	Era C.E Era A.H	Tomb	City	Province
Abdullah Shah Ghazi	Descendant of Imam Hasan ibn Ali	720-773	Clifton	Karachi	Sindh
Ali al-Hujwiri	Hanafi	990-1077	Data Darbar	Lahore	Punjab
Bahauddin Zakariya	Suhrawardiyya	1070-1167	Multan City	Multan	Punjab
Ganj e Inayat Sarkar	Naqshbandi	1937_2011	Gulberg 3	Lahore	Punjab
Makhdoom Rukn-ud-din, Shah Rukn-e-Alam	Suhrawardiyya	1151-1235	Multan City	Multan	Punjab
Makhdoom Burhan-ud-din	Suhrawardiyya	1155-1245	Langer Makhdoom	Chiniot	Punjab
Sayyid Muhammad Al-Makki	Descendant of Ali al-Hadi	1145-1246	Arak Fort, Bukkur	Sukkur	Sindh
Fariduddin Ganjshakar	Chishti	1173–1266 or 1188-1280	Pakpattan	Pakpattan	Punjab
Syed Muhammad Usman (Lal Shahbaz Qalandar)		1177-1274	Sehwan Sharif	Jamshoro District	Sindh
Hazrat Syed Rakhyal Shah Sufi Al Qadri (Balochistan)	Qadri	1262-1359	Dargah Fateh Pur Sharif	Taluka Gandawah, District Jhal Magsi	Balochistan
Jalaluddin Surkh-Posh Bukhari	Sohrawardi	1199-1291	Mohalla Bukhari	Uch Sharif	Punjab
Jahaniyan Jahangasht	sohrawardi	1308-1384	Mohalla Bukhari	Uch Sharif	Punjab
Daud Bandagi Kirmani		1513-1575	Shergarh	Okara	Punjab
Hazrat Shah Yousuf		15th Century	Shah Yousuf	Shahpur	Punjab
Syed Musa Pak		martyred in 1592 A.D.		Multan	Punjab
Sultan Bahoo	Sarwari Qadri Order	1630-1691	Garh Maharaja(SHORKOT)	Jhang	Punjab
Abdullah Shah Qadri (Bulleh Shah)	Qadiriyya	1680–1757	Mazar of Bulleh Shah	Kasur	Punjab
Shah Sulaimān Nūri	Qadiriyya Order	1508-1604	Purana Bhalwal	Bhalwal	Punjab, Pakistan
Syed Muhammad Noushah Qadiri	Descendant of Hasan ibn Ali/Founder of Naushahia Qadria Order	1552-1654	Ranmal Sharif	Phalia	Mandi Bahauddin District
Shams Ali Qalandar	Owaisi Qadri Noshahi	1874-1966	Shamsabad	Okara District	Punjab
Abul Faiz Qalander Ali Suharwardi	Soharvardiya			Lahore	Punjab
Qalandar Baba Auliya	Imam Silsila e Azeemia	1898 - Jan 27, 1979	Shadman Town	Karachi	Sindh
Qudrat Ullah Shahab	SILSILA E OWASIA	1917 - July 24, 1986		Islamabad	Punjab
Shaikh ul Quran Allama Ghulam Ali Okarvi	Qaadiri, Ashrafi	1919-2000	Gt Road Okara	Okara	Punjab
Maulana Muhammad Shafee Okarvi	Qaadiri, Naqshbandi	1929-1984	Gulistaan e Okarvi	Karachi	Sindh
Bibi Pak Daman	Daughter of Imam Ali	681	681 (62 AH) her presence in a village of present-day Lahore	Lahore	Punjab
Babasain Shah Hasan Din	silsila Aliya, Awal Qadir Qalander	1898-1968	Baghbanpura	Lahore	Punjab
Babasain Hafiz Muhammad Iqbal	silsila Aliya, Awal Qadir Qalander	1939-2002	Baghbanpura	Lahore	Punjab
Muhammad Qasim Sadiq	Qasimiya Naqshbandiya	1800-1943	Mohra Sharif	Murree	Punjab
Wasif Ali Wasif			Miani Sb Graveyard	Lahore	Punjab
Pir Meher Ali Shah	Qadiriyya, Chishti-Nizami	1859-1937	Golra Sharif	Islamabad	Islamabad Capital Territory
Bayazid Ansari		1525–1582/1585	Kaniguram	South Waziristan	FATA
Pir Syed Muhammad Channan Shah Nuri, Syed Faiz-ul Hassan Shah, Syed Muhammad Jewan Shah Naqvi, Muhammad Amin Shah Sani, Syed Muhammad Hussain Shah, Pir Syed Khalid Hasan Shah	Naqshbandia Mujadadia Aminia	1798-1898	Allo Mahar	Sialkot	Punjab
Abdul Wahab Faruqi (Sachal Sarmast)		1739-1829	Daraza	Khairpur	Sindh
Sultan Sakhi Sarwar		13th Century	Sakhi Sarwar	Dera Ghazi Khan	Punjab
Syed Ali Ahmad shah Gilani Qadri	Qadiriyya	19th Century		Dera Ghazi Khan	Punjab
Khwaja Ghulam Farid	Chishti-Nizami	1845-1901	Mithankot	Rajanpur	Punjab
Shah Yusaf Gardez	Twelver Shia			Multan	Punjab
Shah Qabool Aulia		1101–1181		Peshawar	Khyber Pakhtunkhwa
Ghazi Syed Shah Fateh Muhammad Bukhari		16th Century	Wadpagga Sharif	Peshawar	Khyber Pakhtunkhwa
Imam Ali-ul-Haq		13th Century		Sialkot	Punjab
Pir Pathan	Chishti Nizami	1770-1850	Tonsa	Tonsa	Punjab, Pakistan
Muhammad Shamsuddin Sialvi	Chishti-Nizami	1799-1883	Sial Sharif		Punjab
Pir Sher Muhammad		1865-1928	Sharaqpur	Sheikhupura	Punjab
Shah Abdul Latif Bhittai			Bhit Shah	Matiari	Sindh
Shah Abdul Latif Kazmi		1617–1705	Bari Imam	Islamabad	Punjab
Shah Hussain				Lahore	Punjab
Shah Jamal	Qadiriyyah, Suhrawardiyya	1588-1671	Shrine of Shah Jamal	Lahore	Punjab
Shah Shams-ud-Din Sabzwari				Multan	Punjab
Pir Mangho	A Descendant of Ali ibn Abi Talib	720-773	Gadap Town	Karachi	Sindh
Syed Ali Miran Al Bhakkari (Rizawi, Naqvi)	A Desdendant of Imam Al Hadi	16th Century	Mona Syeddan	M.B Din	Punjab
Sakhi Shah Chan Charagh	Twelver Shia	?	Raja Bazaar	Rawalpindi	Punjab
Khwaja Amoor Ul Hasan	Chishti-Sabri	1925-1986	Pakpatan	Pakpatan	Punjab
Pir Nazir Ahmed, Sarkar Morvi	Silsala Nisbet Rasuli	1878-1960	Mohara Sharif	Murree	Punjab
Pir Abdul-ul-karim Pir Hadi Hassan Bux Shah Jilani	naqsbandi Order Qadr	? 18th century	Eidgah sharif Duthro Sharif	Rawalpindi Sanghar	Punjab Sindh
Hazrat Baba Ghous Muhammad Yousuf Shah Taji	Qadiriyyah, Chishtiyyah, Tajiyyah	1885-1947	Khanqah-e-Aaliya Tajiya, Mewa Shah	Karachi	Sindh
Hazrat Baba Zaheen Shah Taji	Qadiriyyah, Chishtiyyah, Yousufiyyah, Tajiyyah	1902-1978	Khanqah-e-Aaliya Tajiya, Mewa Shah	Karachi	Sindh
Hazrat Baba Albeyle Shah Yousufi	Qadiriyyah, Chishtiyyah, Yousufiyyah, Tajiyyah	1920s-1993	Jama Haqqani Masjid, Pathan Colony	Karachi	Sindh
Hazrat Baba Shah Mehmood Yousufi	Qadiriyyah, Chishtiyyah, Yousufiyyah, Albeyliyyah, Tajiyyah	1944-2024	Jama Haqqani Masjid, Pathan Colony	Karachi	Sindh
Peer Syed Saeedul Hassan, Sarkar Mararvi	Silsala Naqashbandi Qadri Mujadadi	1997-till date	Walton Cantonment	Lahore	Punjab
Syed Shah Sadaruddin Lakyari/ Laki Shah Saddar	Descendant of Imam Musa Kazim		Jamshoro	Jamshoro	Sindh
Pir Syed Said Ali Shah Gardazi, Sohawi	Chishti	19th century	Sohawa Sharif	Dhirkot, Bagh	Azad Kashmir
Pir Syed Lal Shah Bari		17th century	Garhi Khairo	Jacobabad	Sindh

== Gallery ==
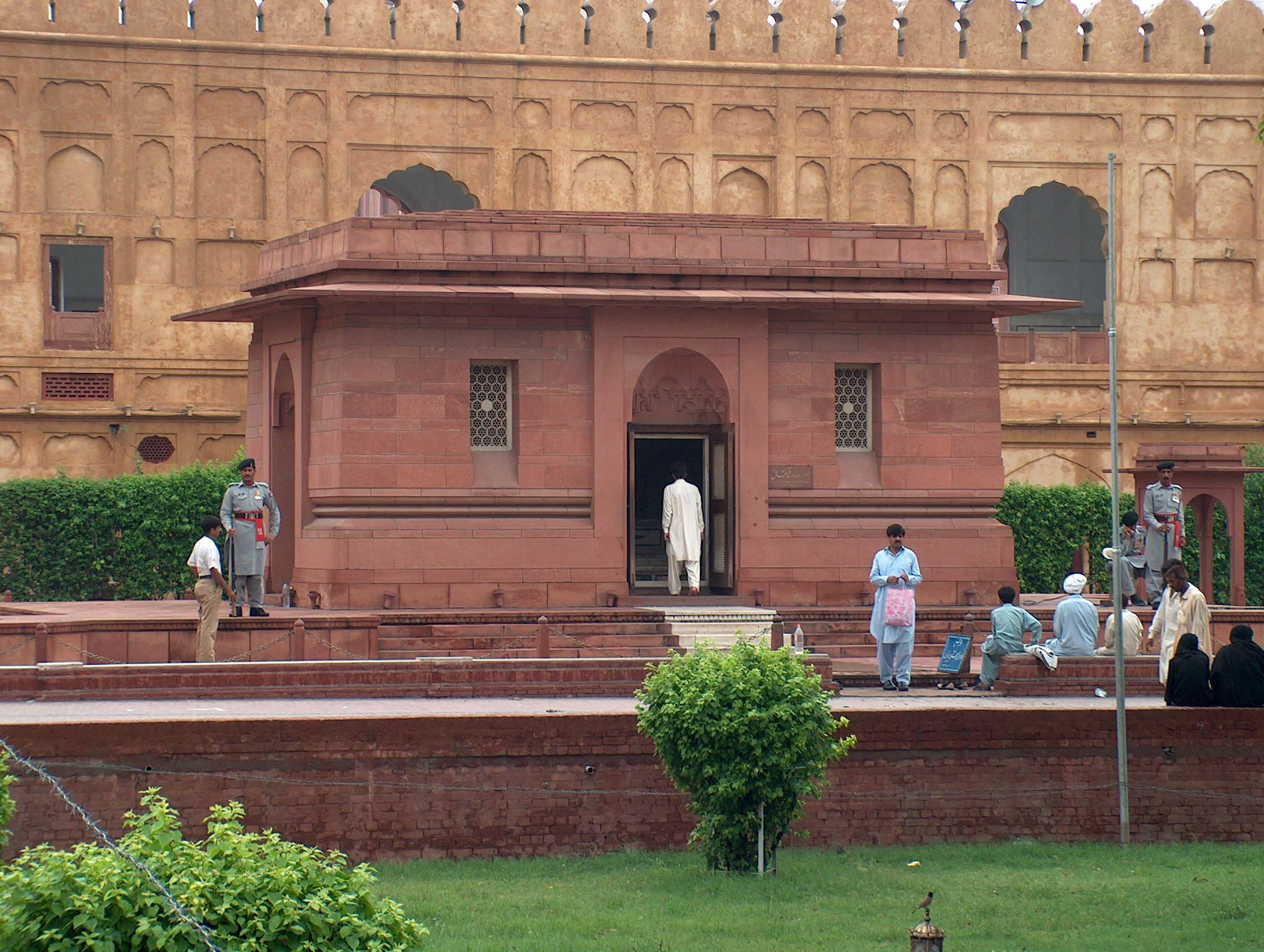
Mausoleum of Muhammad Iqbal, Lahore

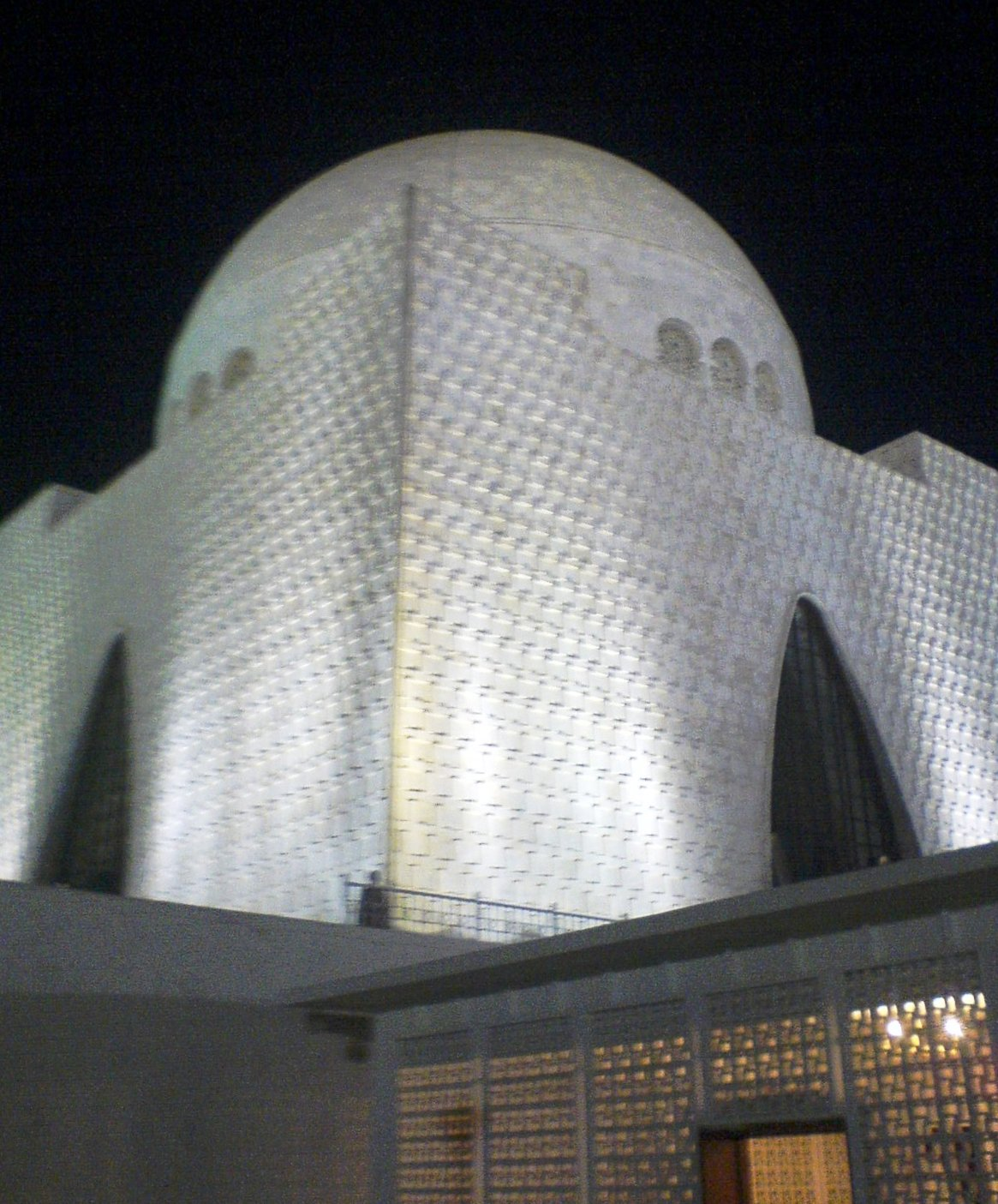
Mausoleum of Muhammad Ali Jinnah also called Mazar-e-Quaid, Karachi.

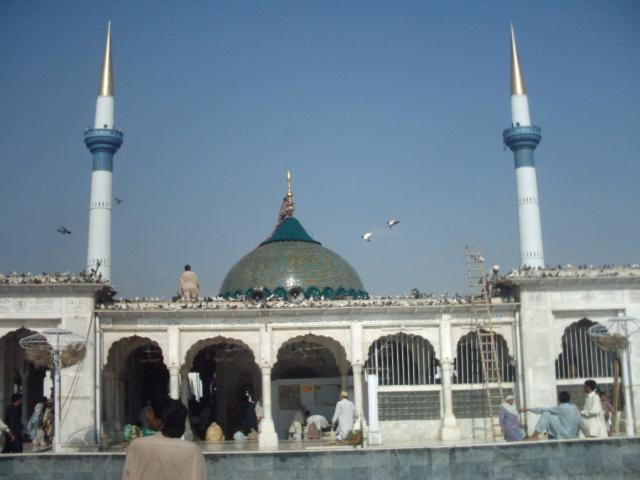
Mausoleum and Mosque of Sufi Saint Abul Hassan Ali Hajweri, Lahore.

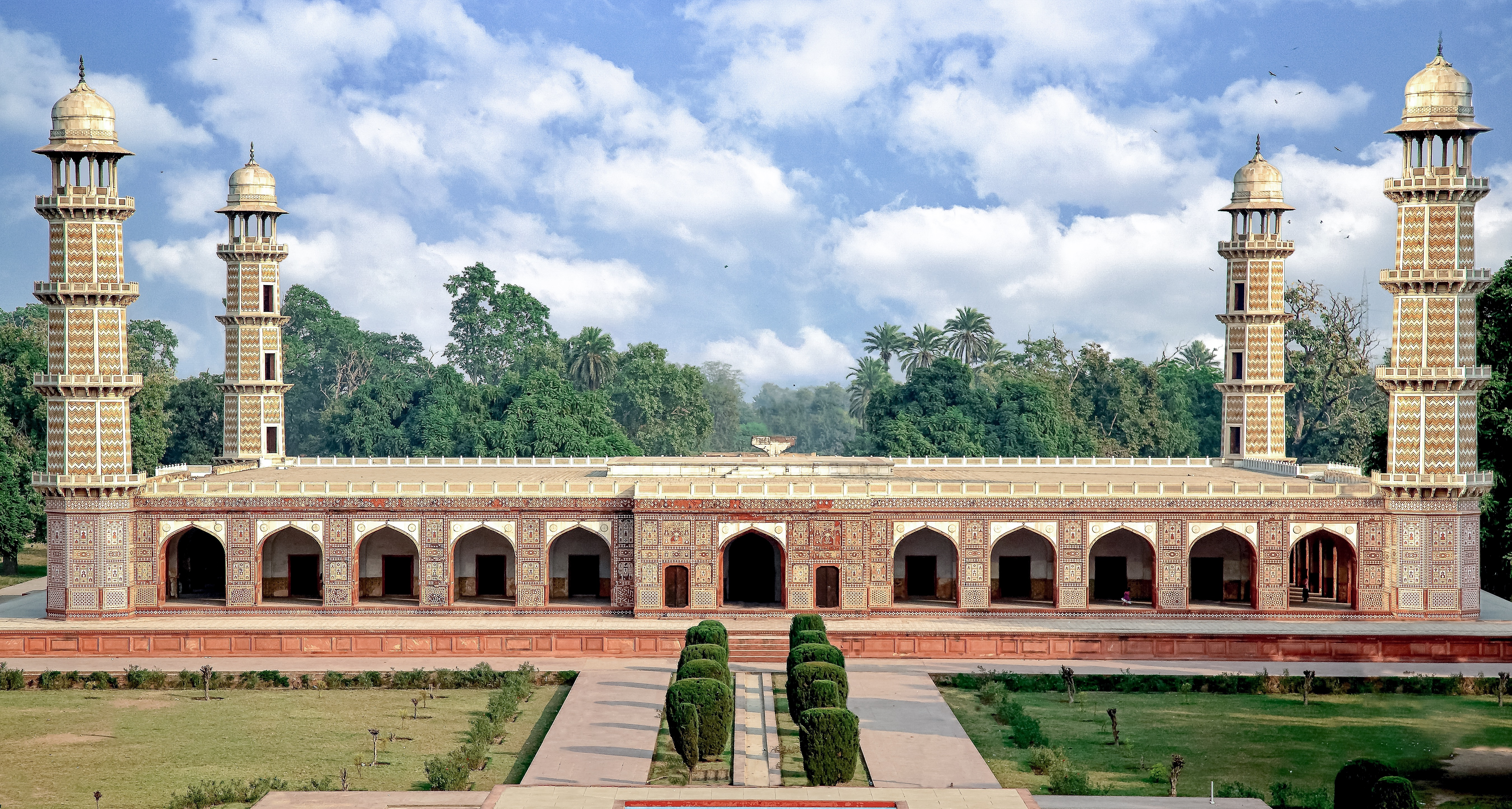
Tomb of Jahangir, Lahore

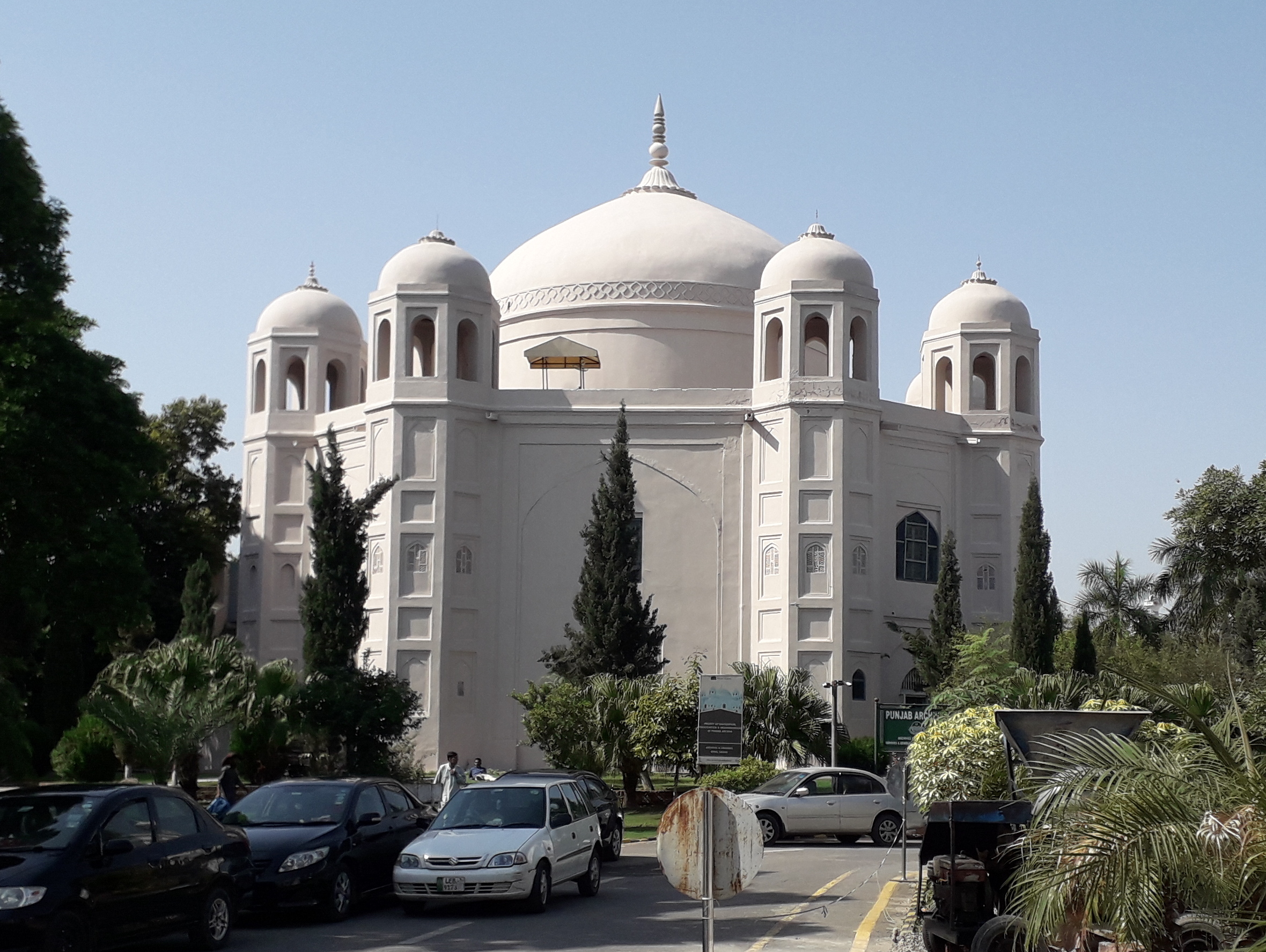
Tomb of Anarkali, Lahore

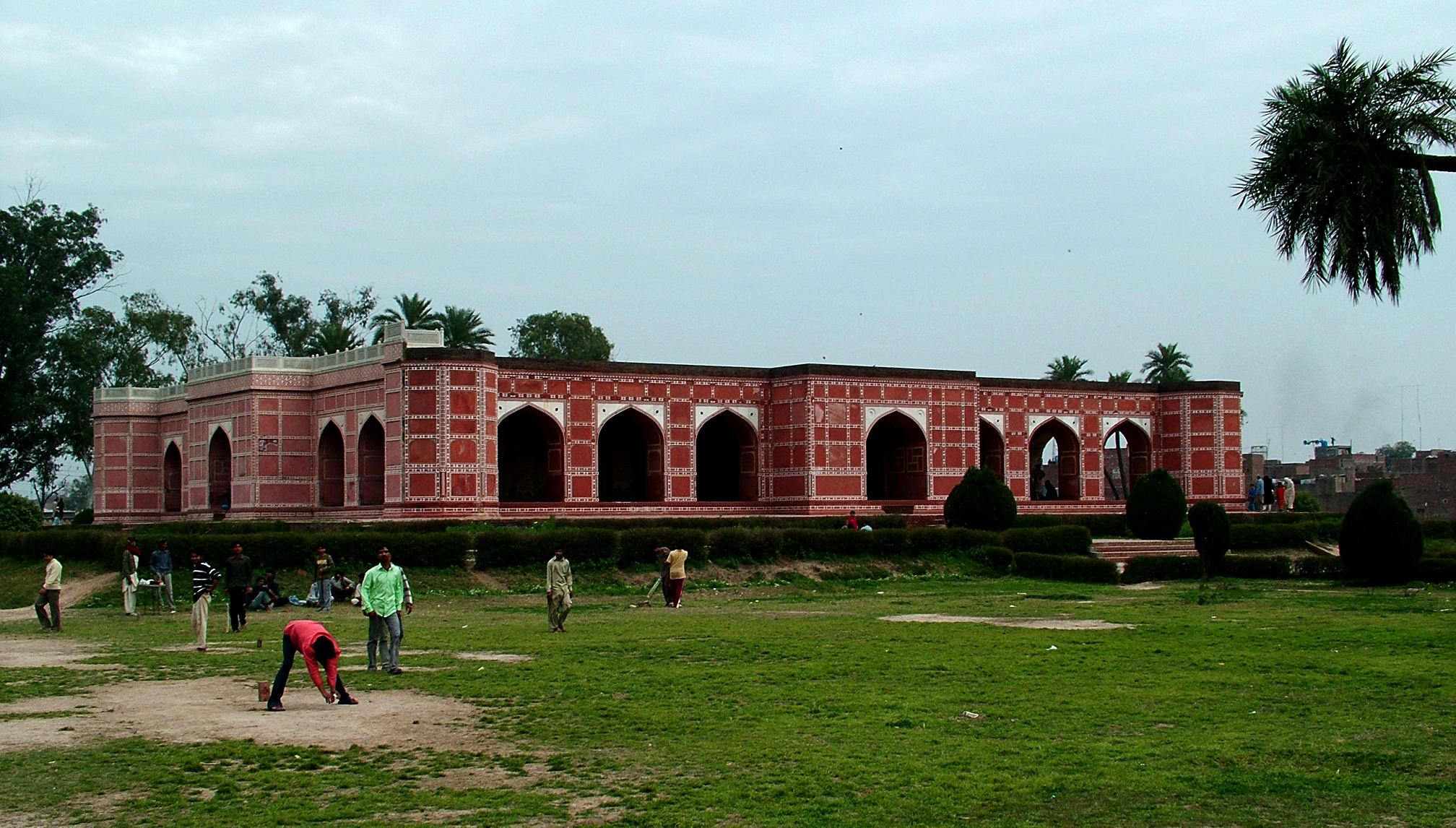
Tomb of Nur Jahan, Lahore

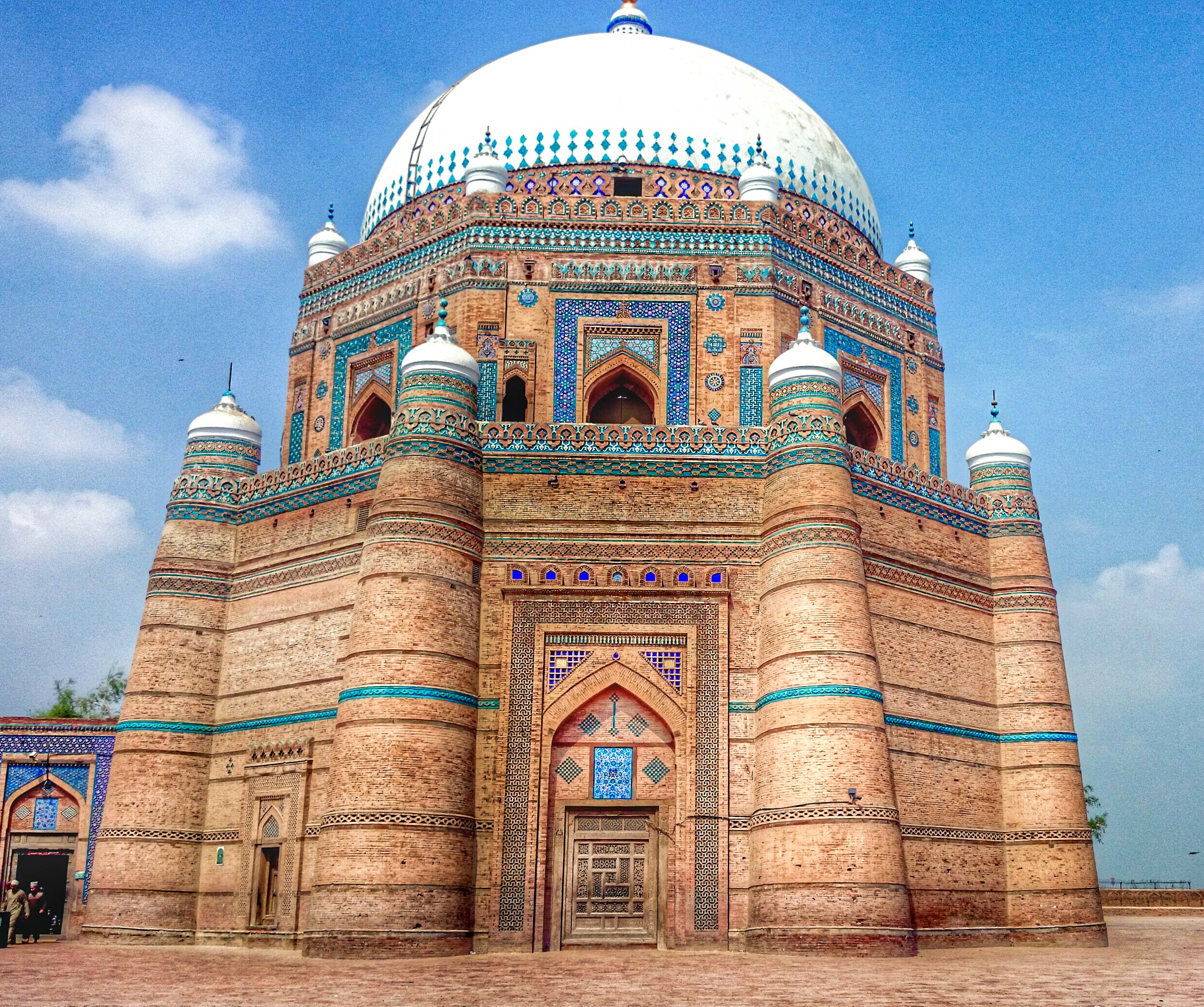
Tomb of Shah Rukn-e-Alam, one of many mausoleums of Multan

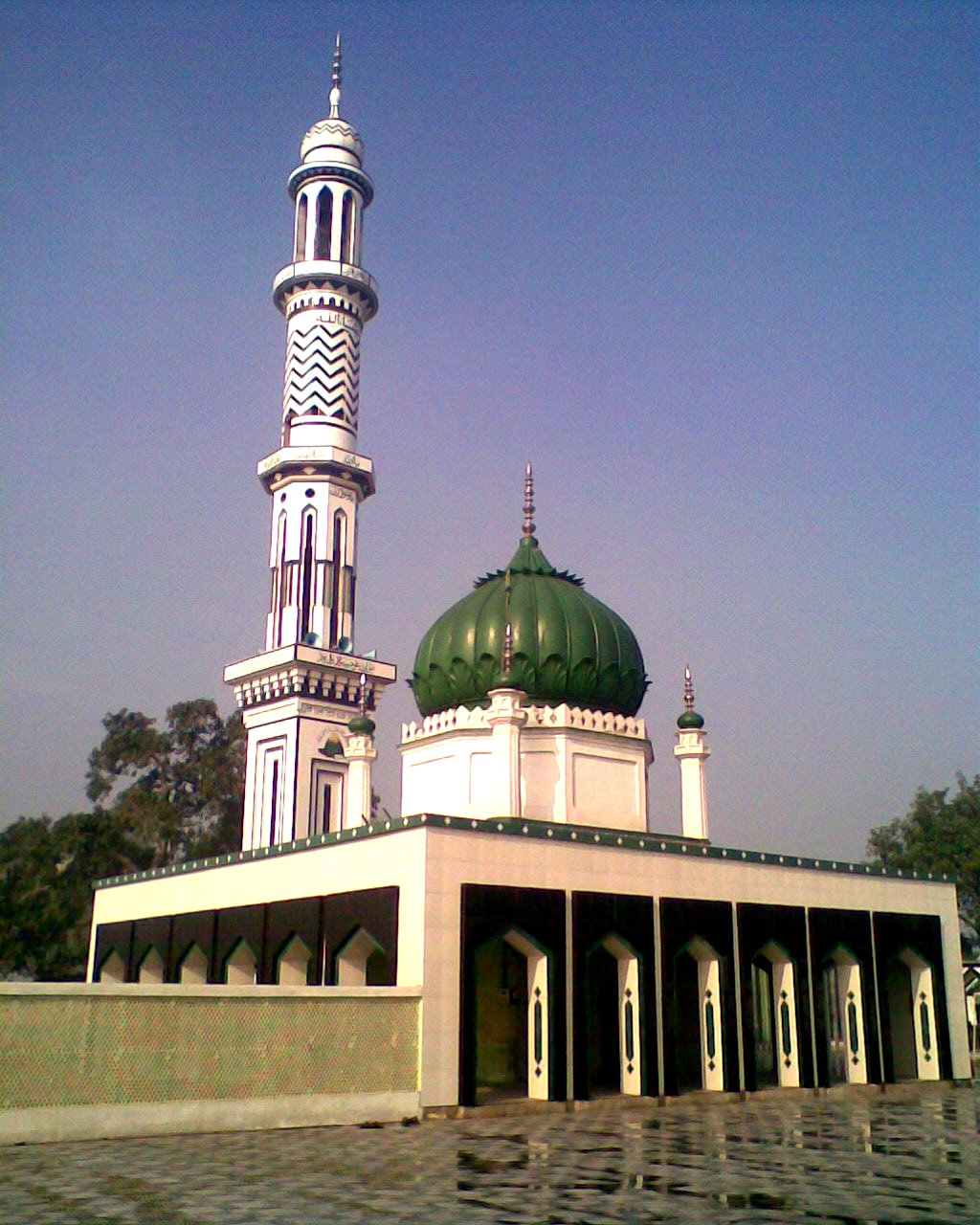
Tomb of Syed Faiz-ul Hassan Shah and Muhammad Amin Shah Sani in Allo Mahar, Sialkot.

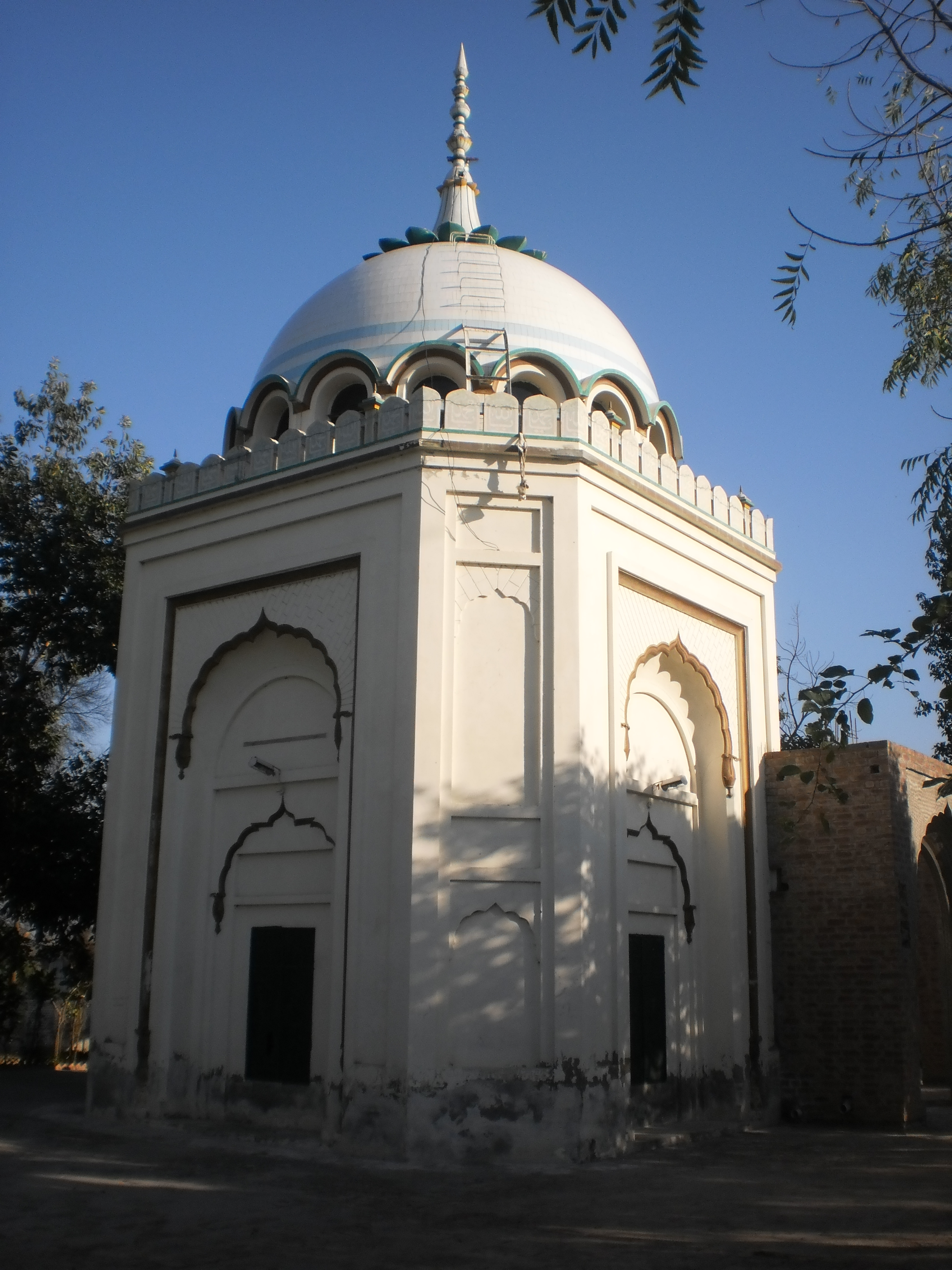
Mausoleum of Shams Ali Qalandar, Shamsabad, Hujra Shah Muqeem

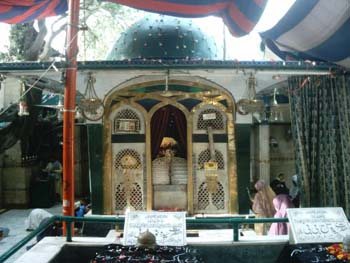
Mausoleum of Bibi Pak Daman, Lahore.

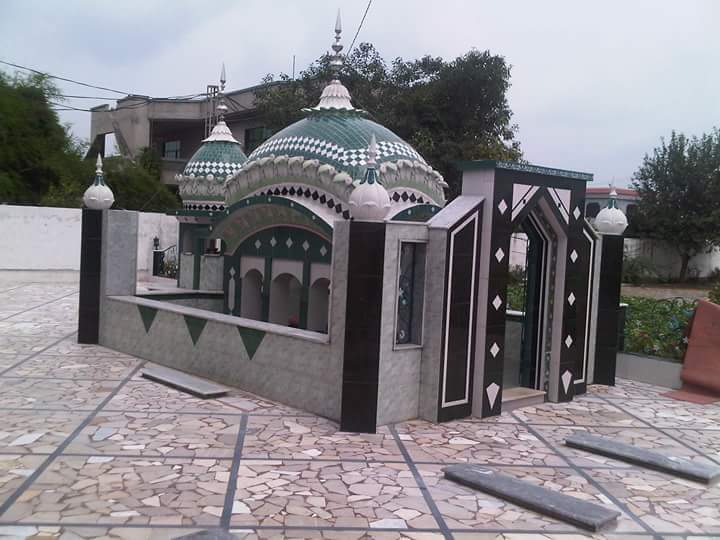
Tomb of Syed Muhammad Jewan Shah Naqvi in Allo Mahar, Sialkot.

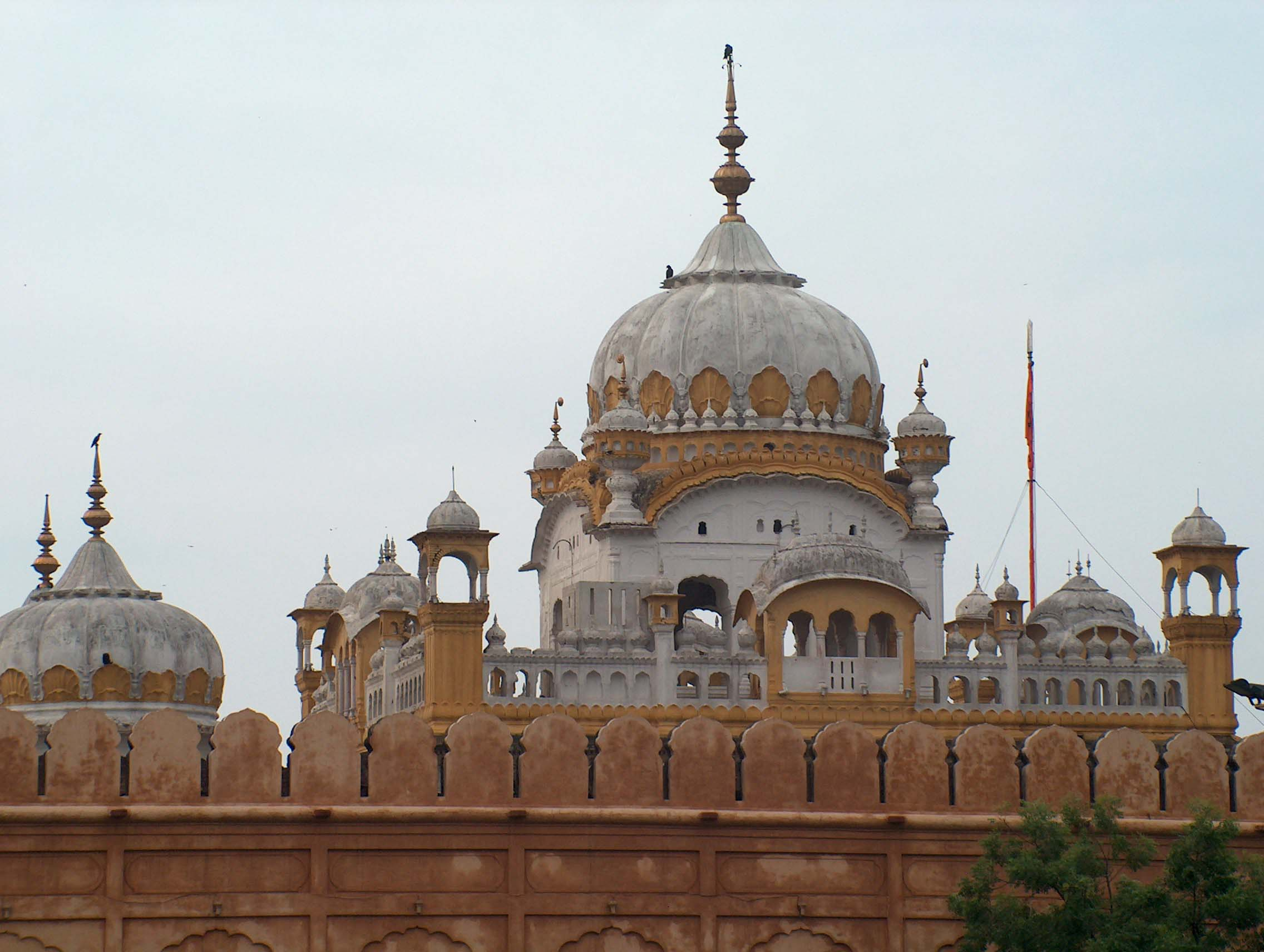
Samadhi of Ranjit Singh, Lahore.

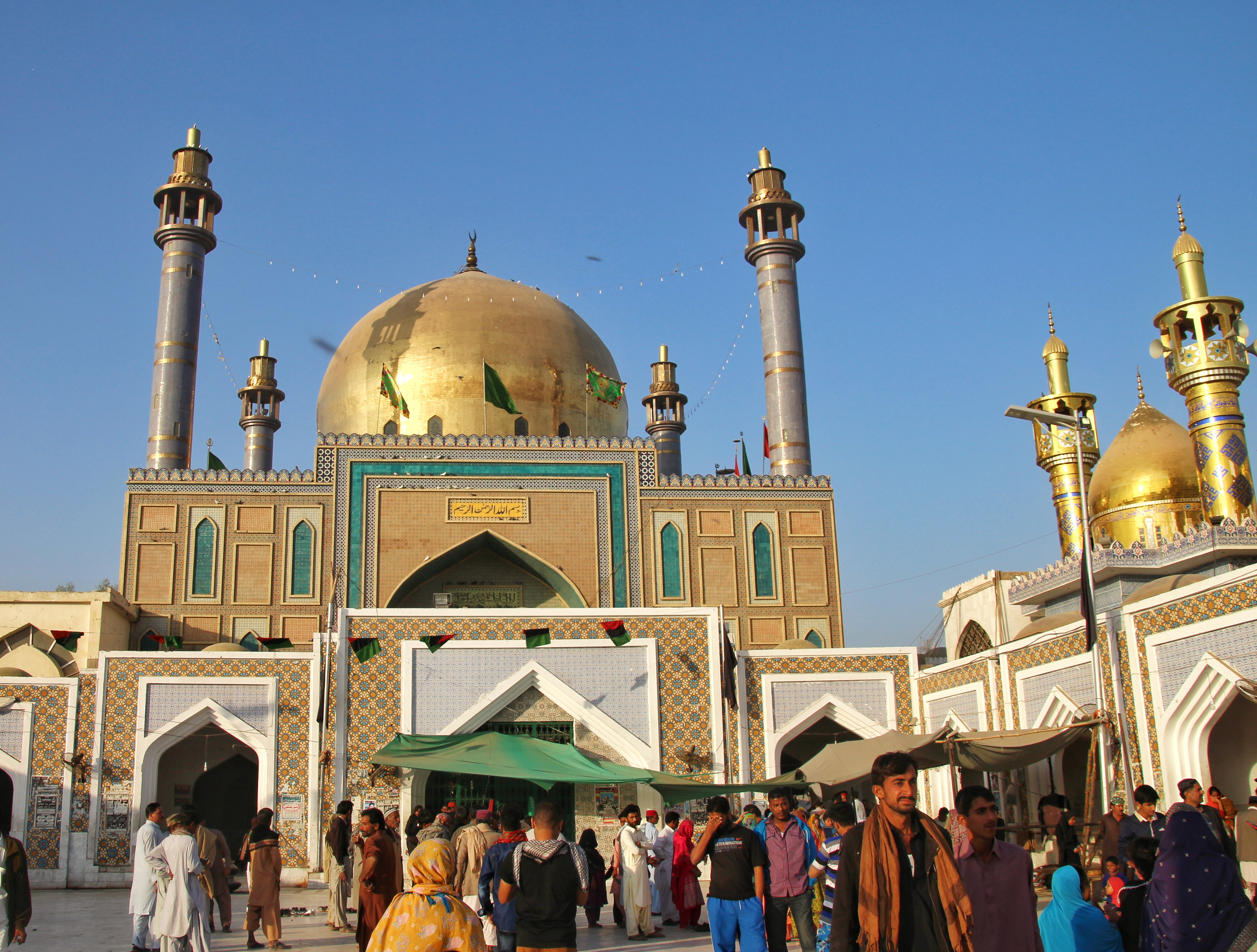
Shrine of Lal Shahbaz Qalandar, Sehwan

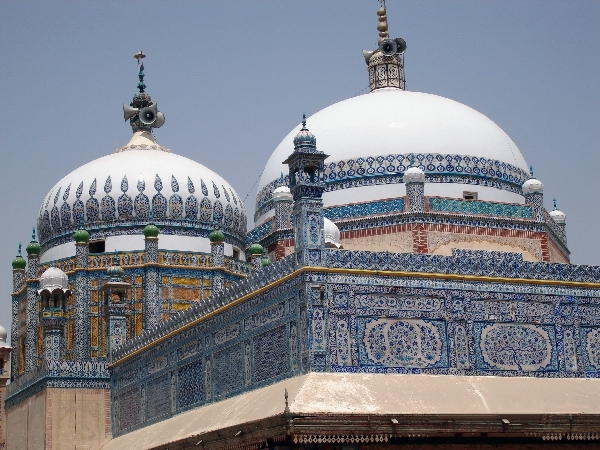
Khwaja Ghulam Farid's Mausoleum at Kot Mithan.

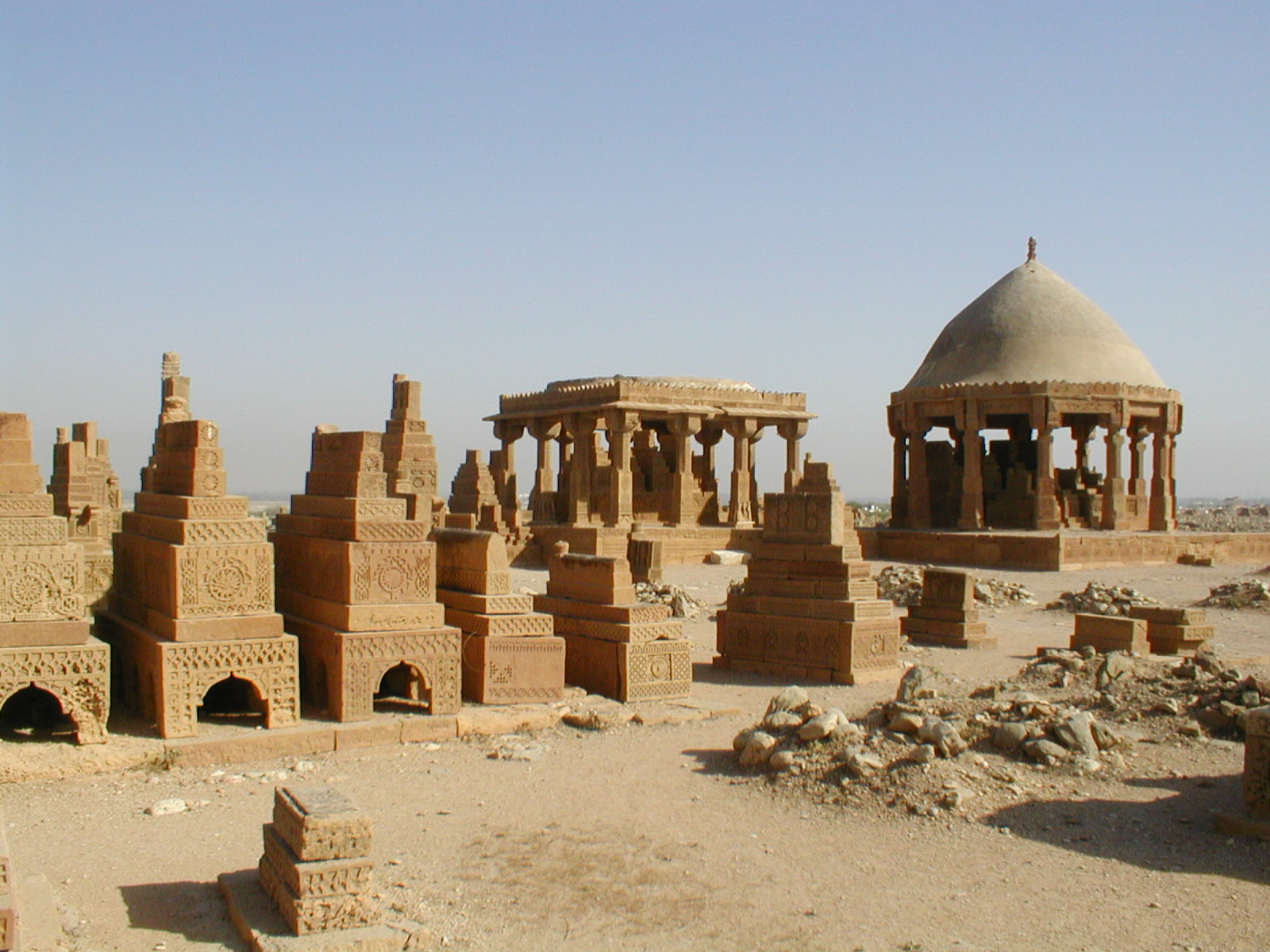
Chaukhandi tombs, 25 km east of Karachi on N-5 National Highway

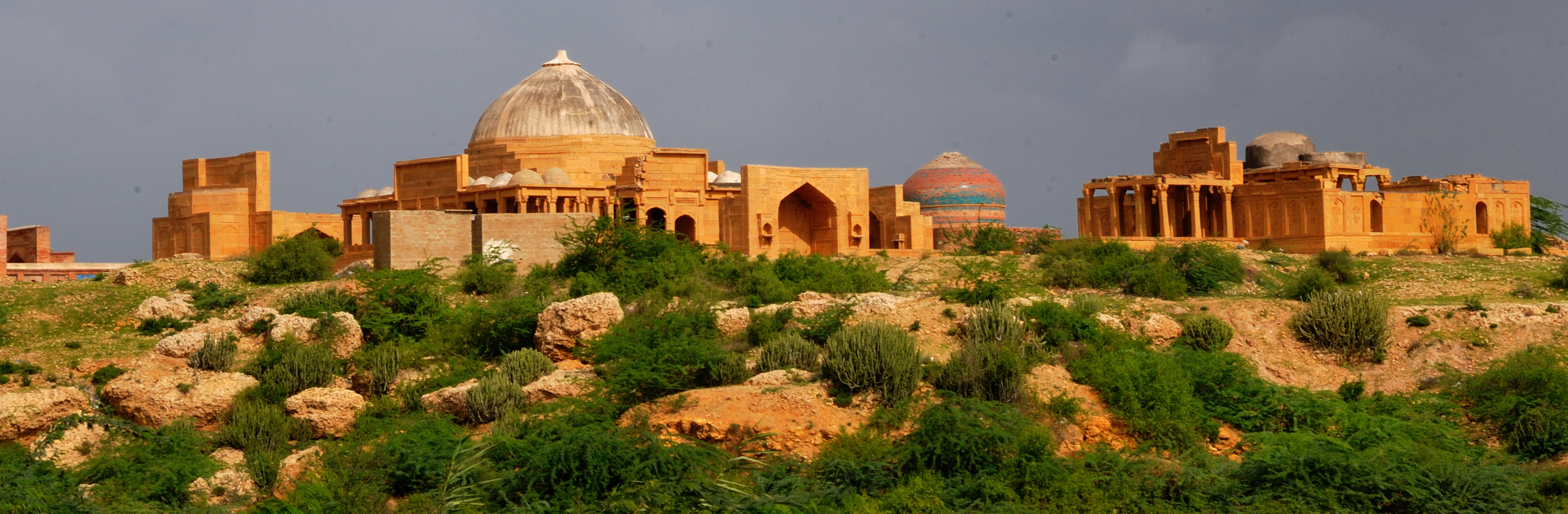
Cluster of tombs at Makli Necropolis

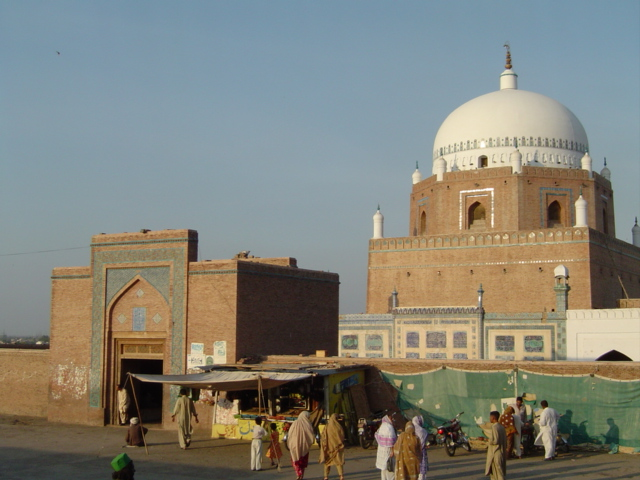
Baha-ud-din Zakariya's Mausoleum in Multan

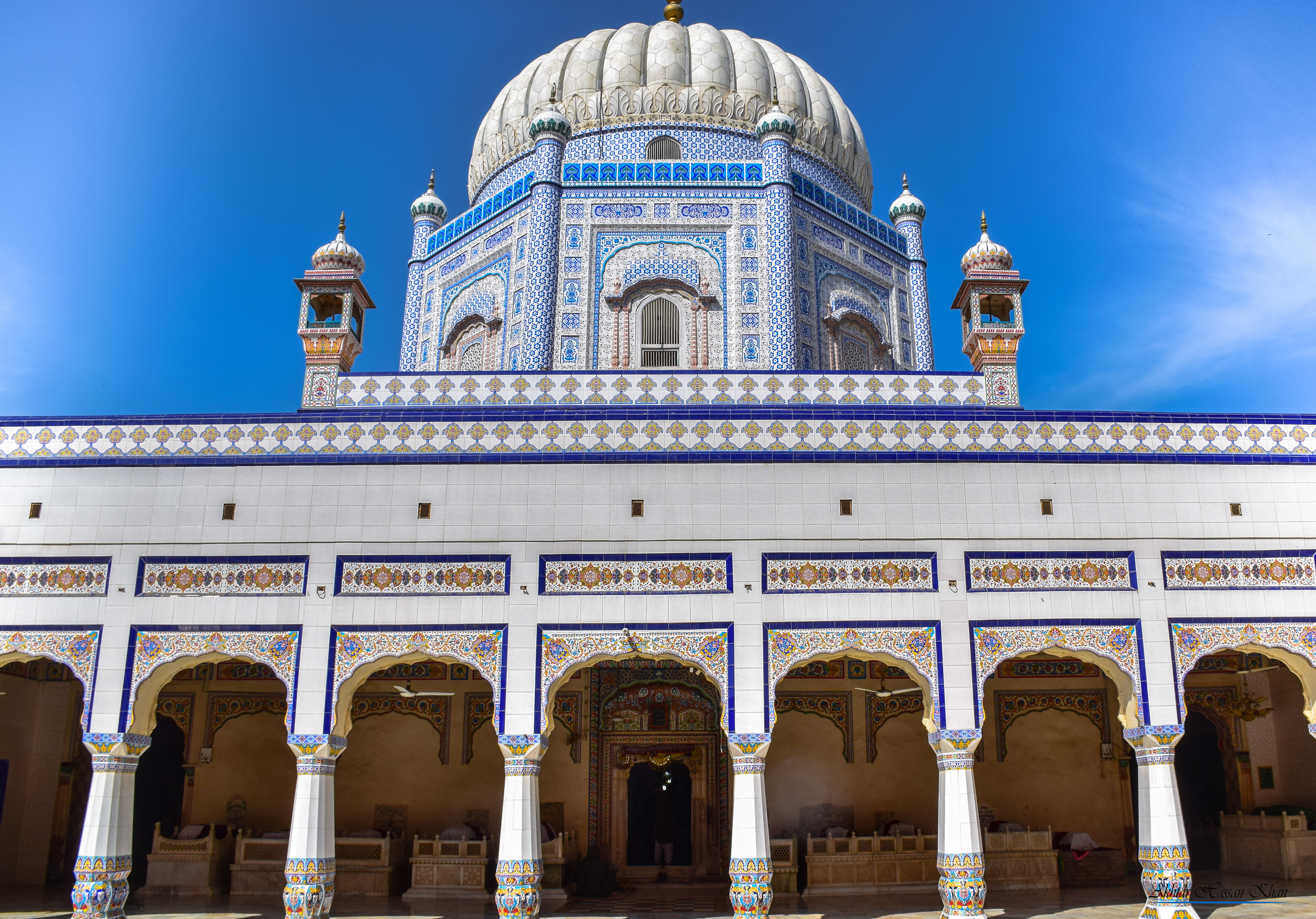
Shrine of Pir Pathan in Tonsa

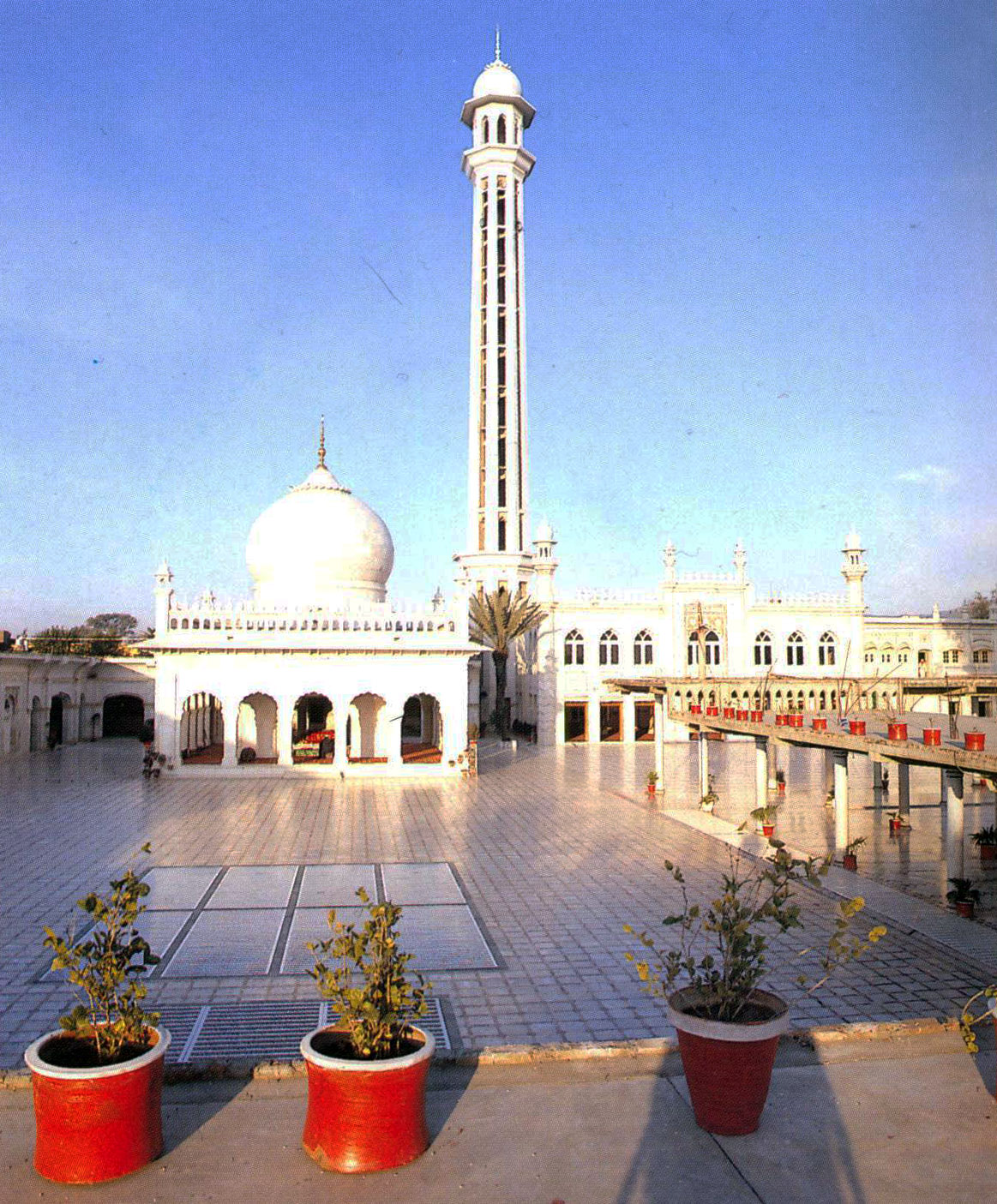
Mausoleum of Pir Meher Ali Shah, Golra Sharif, Islamabad

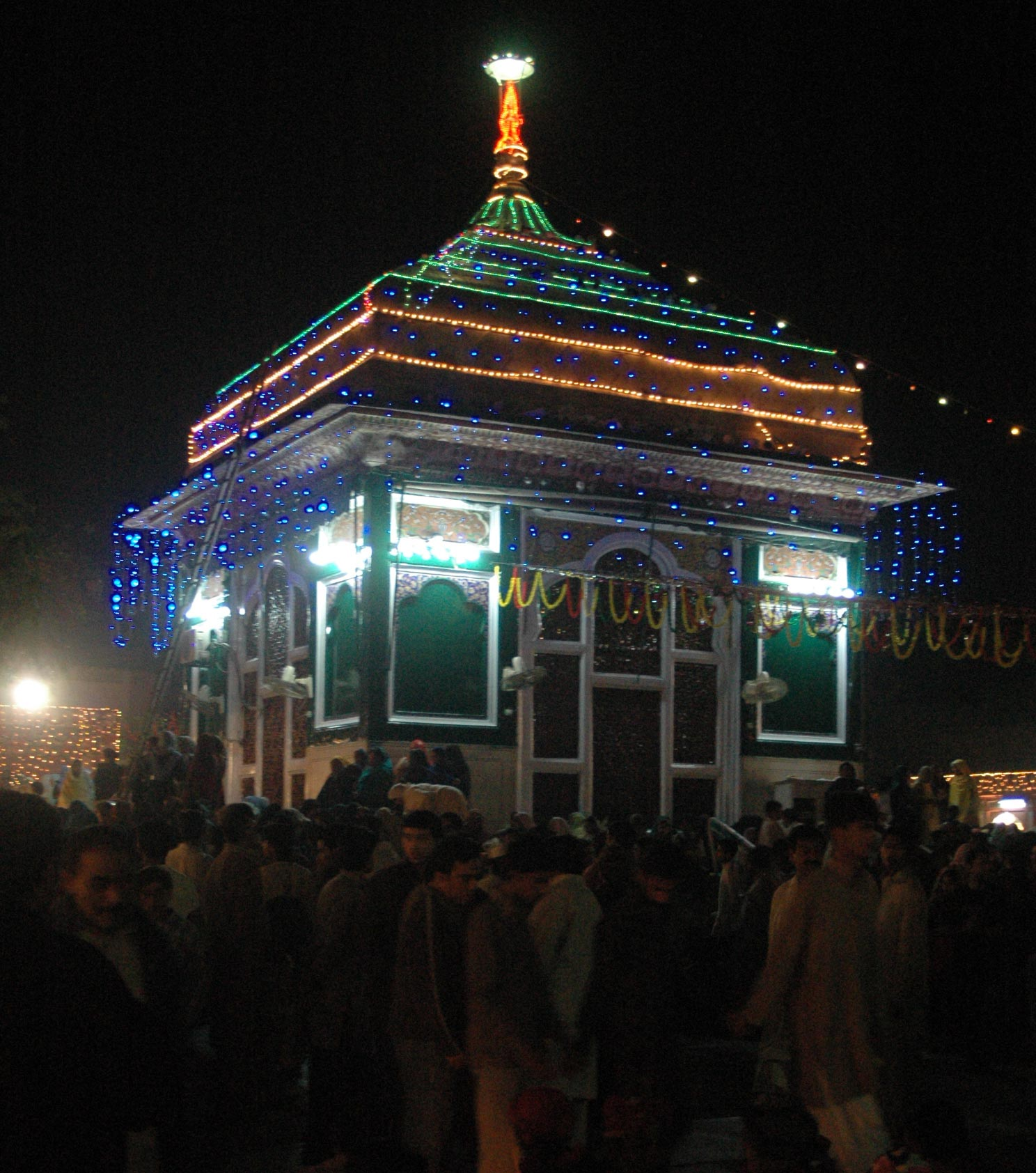
Mausoleum of Mir Muhammad better known as Mian Mir in Lahore; he was the spiritual instructor of Mughal Prince Dara Shikoh.

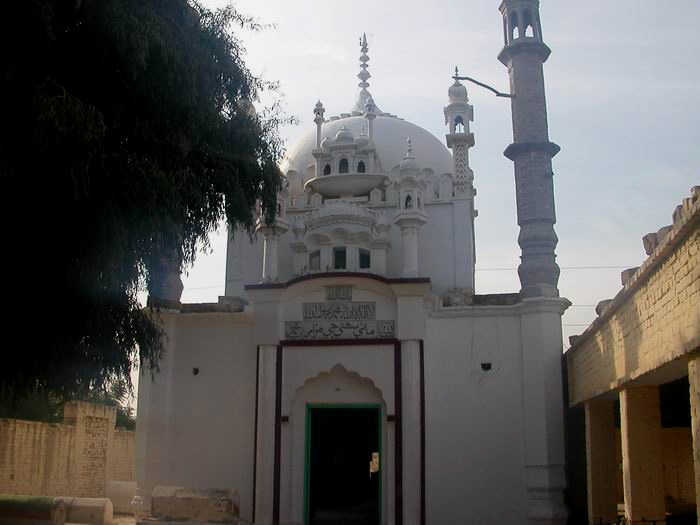
Mausoleum of Sohni Mahiwal in Shahdadpur, Sindh

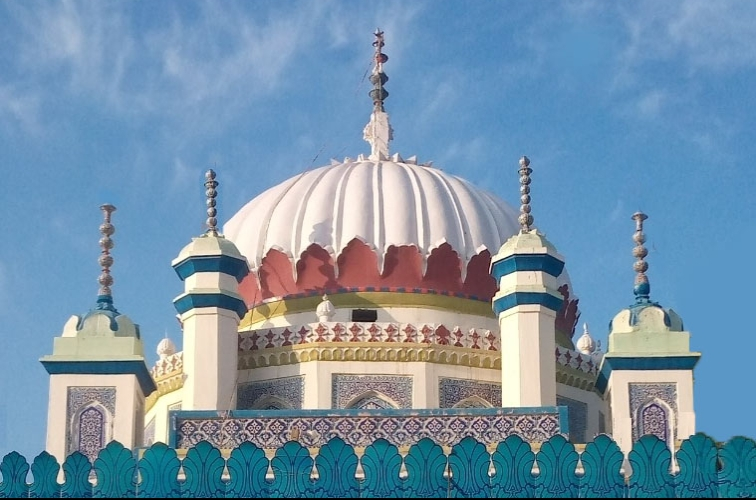
Shrine of Pir Hadi Hassan Bux Shah Jilani, Duthro Sharif, Sanghar, Sindh

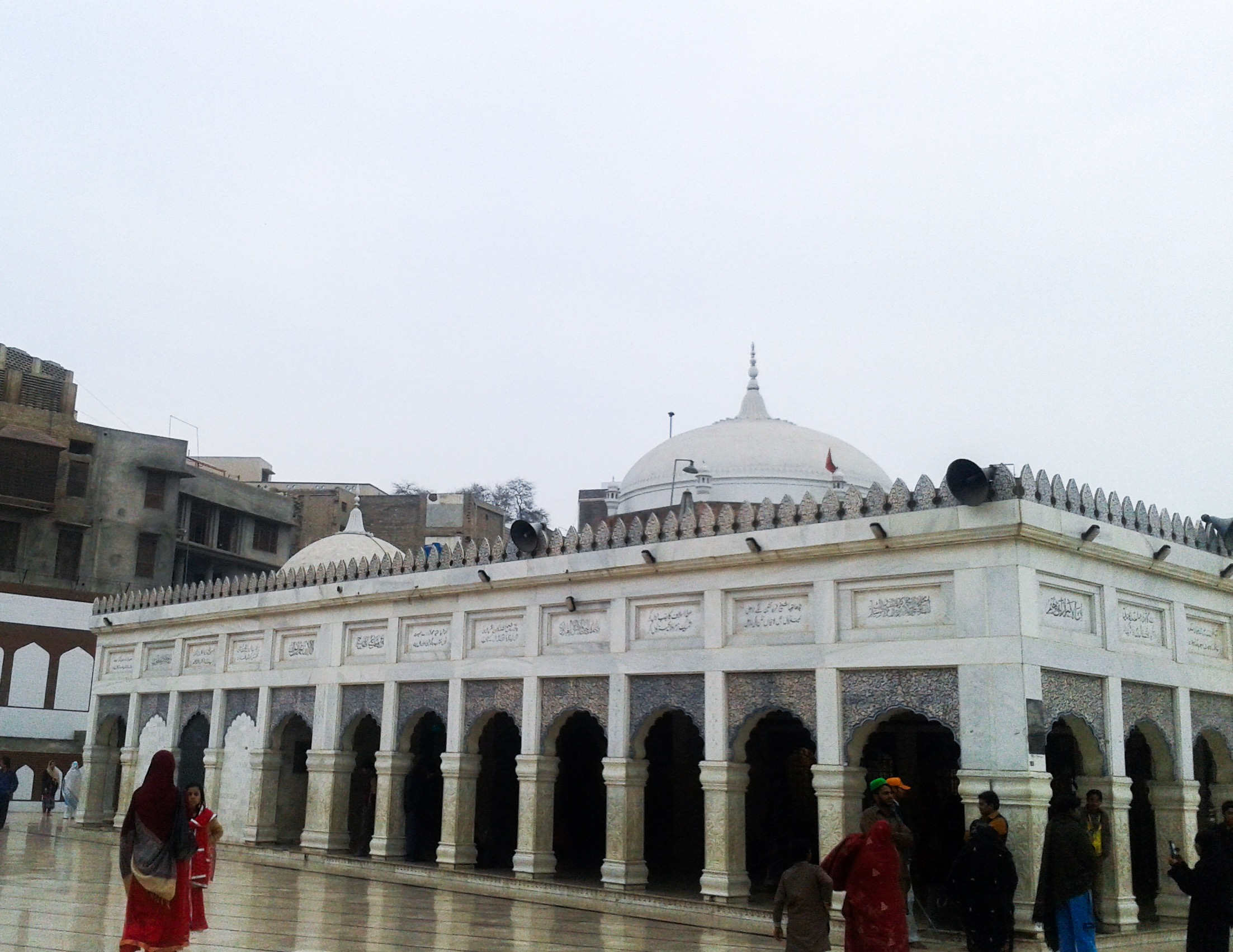
The shrine of Baba Farid

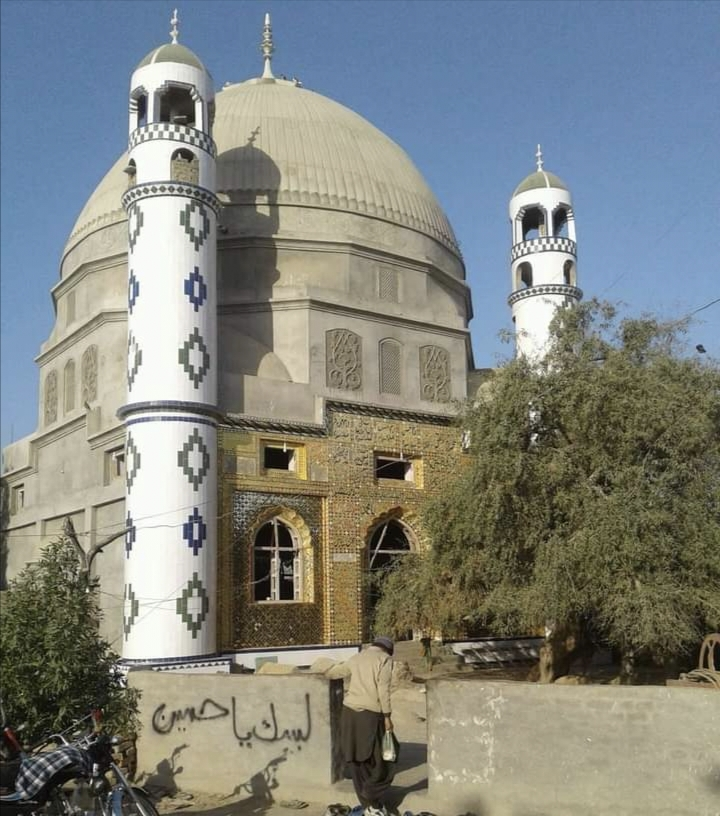
Shrine of Lal Shah Bari in the Tehsil of Garhi Khairo, district Jacobabad, Sindh

== See also ==
- List of mausoleams
- Mausoleums of Multan
