= Doda Pur =

- Union council, Deh and town
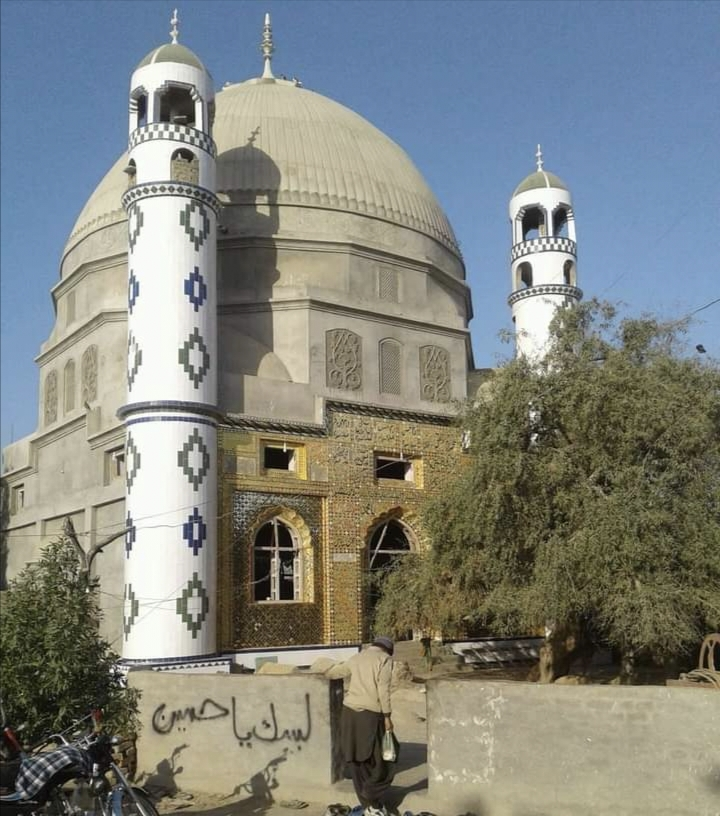
- The Shrine of Lal Shah Bari is a 17th-century Sufi shrine within the Dodapur Union Council.
- Interactive map of Doda Pur
- Coordinates: 28°03′31″N 68°10′13″E
- Country: Pakistan
- Province: Sindh
- Division: Larkana Division
- District: Jacobabad District
- Tehsil: Garhi Khairo Tehsil

Dodapur also spelled Doda Pur is a Town and union council of Garhi Khairo Tehsil in Jacobabad District, Sindh Province, Pakistan. Dodapur is located in the rural agricultural belt of Garhi Khairo Tehsil and is connected by the road leading from Garhi Khairo to Jacobabad.

The Shrine of Lal Shah Bari is located within the boundaries of Dodapur Union Council, which is one of the Sufi religious sites of Garhi Khairo Taluka.

== Geography ==
The Dodapur Union council is situated in northern Sindh, Pakistan, at 28.05866 (28°3'31"N), 68.1704 (68°10'13"E).

== Historic Guest House ==
According to the heritage records of Sindh, there is an old Guest house (Otaq) in Doda Pur associated with the family of Mumtaz Ali Bhutto.

The Otaq (guest house) is situated near the main road leading to Garhi Khairo and was built by the grandfather of Mumtaz Ali Bhutto. A small, old mosque is also attached to the original Guest House.

Later, a new guest house was also constructed by the Bhutto family next to the old building.

The Endowment Fund Trust has included this Otaq (guest house) among the documented heritage sites of Jacobabad district.

== Education ==
Dodapur, Garhi Khairo Taluka, is an important rural educational center. According to current Sindh educational records, Government Boys Higher Secondary School Dodapur has been declared the central school of the Doda Pur Cluster.

== See also ==
- Jacobabad District
- Garhi Khairo Tehsil
- Shrine of Lal Shah Bari
- Dil Sher Brohi
- Allahabad, Jacobabad
