= Umed Ali Junejo =

Village in Sindh Province, Pakistan

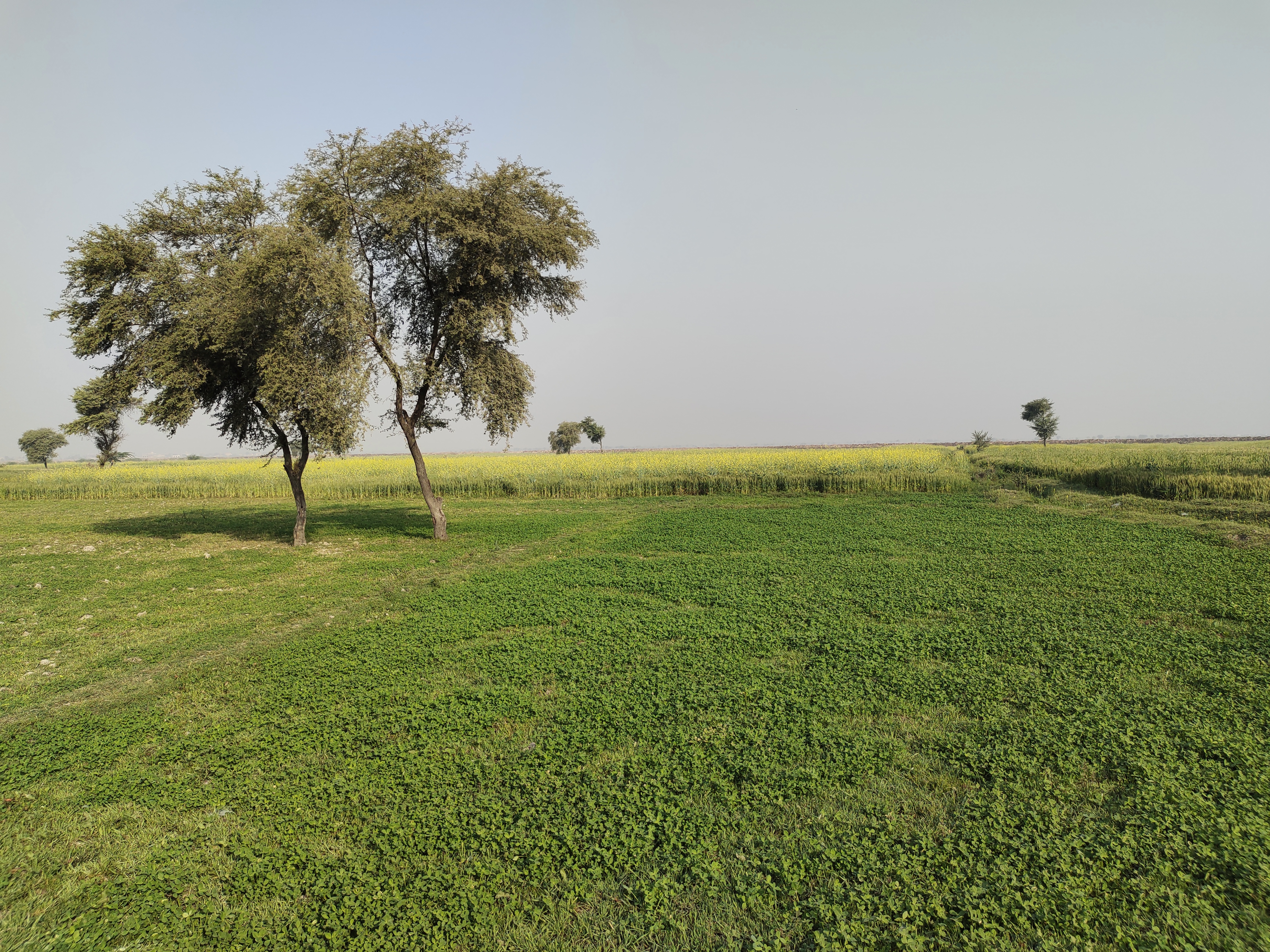
Seasonal growing plants in field of Umeed Ali Junejo Village in 2021 in Qambar Shahdadkot District

Umeed Ali Junejo, sometimes spelled as Umaid or Umed Ali Junejo, is a village in Sindh, Pakistan. It is located 14 kilometers to the north of Shahdadkot.

== Incidents ==
=== 2010 floods ===
All of the villages and nearby areas were destroyed.

=== 2022 floods ===
Likewise 2010 floods, the village is submerged by water.

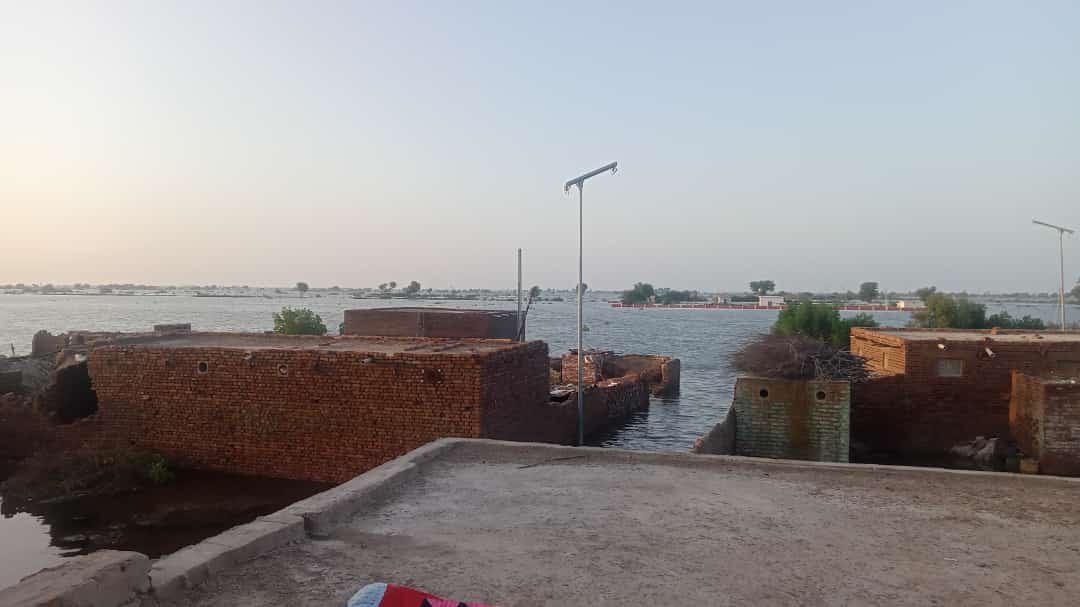
photo of Umed Ali Junejo village surrounded by 2022 Pakistan floods.

== See also ==
- Umid Ali Junejo railway station
- Shahdadkot
- Garhi Khairo
