= Daira Bhattian Wala =

ڈیرہ راجپوت بھٹیاں والہ
- Small town in Eminabad Village
- Daira Rajput Bhattian Wala
- Nickname: Daira Bhattian Da
- Location in Pakistan
- Coordinates: 32°9′N 74°11′E
- Country: Pakistan
- Region: Punjab
- District: Gujranwala District

Population
  - Total: 5,611
- Time zone: UTC+5 (PST)
  - Summer (DST): UTC+6 (PDT)
- Area code: 055

Daira Rajput Bhattian (Urdu: ڈیرہ راجپوت بھٹیاں والہ), is a small village located in Eminabad Village Near Devan Road, Gujranwala District located in Punjab, Pakistan. Village.
