= Shahdadkot =

Pakistani town and administrative area

Shahdadkot شھدادڪوٽ
- City
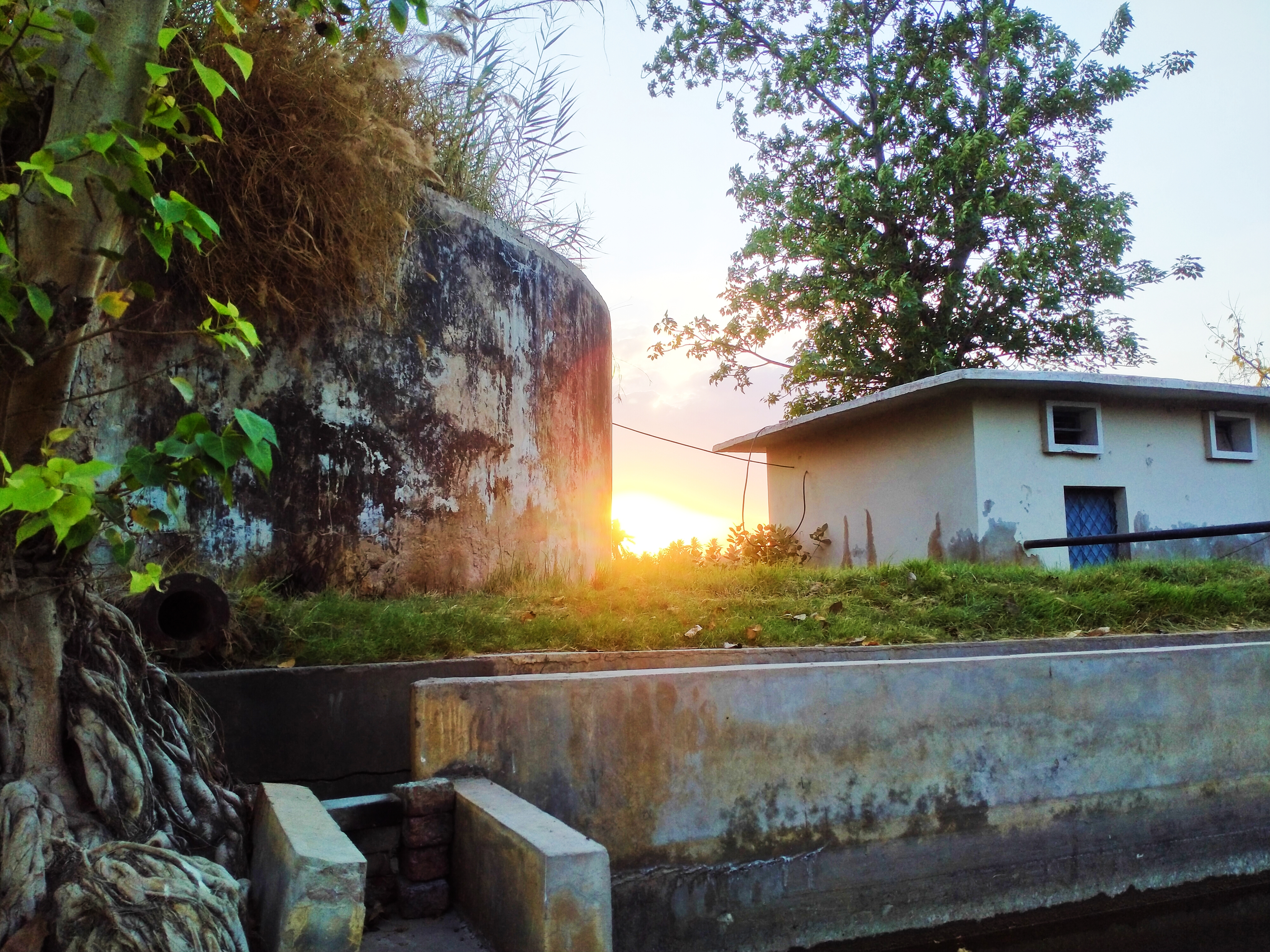
- Water Supply Shahdadkot

- Location of Shahdadkot Shahdadkot (Pakistan)
- Coordinates: 27°50′49″N 67°54′29″E
- Country: Pakistan
- Province: Sindh
- Division: Larkana Division
- District: Qambar Shahdadkot
- Established: Kalhora Dynasty Rule

Government
  - Type: Municipal Committee
  - Chairman: Yar Muhammad
  - Vice Chairman: Chandur Lal

Population (2023)
  - City: 120,687
  - Rank: 101st in Pakistan
- Post Code: 77300
- Area code: 0744
- Local Languages: Sindhi, Siraiki, Balochi, Brohi

Shahdadkot (Sindhi: شھدادڪوٽ; Urdu: شہدادکوٹ) is a populated city in Qambar Shahdadkot District of Sindh, Pakistan. It was named after the town founder Shahdad Khan Khuhawar. It is located around 51 kilometres northwest of Larkana and 34 kilometers north of Qambar. The town is in close proximity to three districts of Balochistan namely Khuzdar, Jhal Magsi and Usta Muhammad in the west and north of the district. It is linked on the M-8 motorway (Pakistan) route between Gwadar and Ratodero.

City is also a political stronghold of Pakistan People's Party since 1970. The town was also the constituency of the former prime minister of Pakistan, Benazir Bhutto. PPP MPA Meer Nadir Khan Magsi has been elected for more than 3 decades now.

== Health challenges ==
=== Contaminated water ===
The underground water in the Shahdadkot was found to be contaminated with harmful chemicals and heavy metals that made it unfit for human consumption. Officials from the Sindh Environmental Protection Agency who have confirmed the contamination. The water supplied from the government water plants is not properly treated, people are left to fend for themselves to either purchase expensive bottled water or to pay local water suppliers to procure drinking water or drink untreated and unhygienic water. The funds provided by the government all go into the pockets of local corrupt politicians and bureaucrats. No long-term measures are in sight to address the very basic water issue.

=== HIV outbreak ===
There was a significant increase in child HIV cases in the Sindh province of Pakistan in recent years. Officials from the Sindh AIDS Control Program identified poverty, malnutrition, and lack of access to healthcare as some of the factors contributing to the rise in cases. The government responded by providing free HIV testing and treatment to affected children.

== Demographics ==
=== Population ===
Historical population
Year	Pop.	±% p.a.
1951	8,994	—
1961	15,043	+5.28%
1972	24,323	+4.47%
1981	32,888	+3.41%
1998	60,436	+3.64%
2017	118,935	+3.63%
2023	120,687	+0.24%

According to 2023 census, Shahdadkot had a population of 120,687.

Languages

Languages of Shahdadkot MC (2023 Census)
1. Sindhi (93.9%)
2. Brahvi (3.50%)
3. Urdu (1.20%)
4. Others (2.00%)

== Flood destruction ==
In August 2022, Heavy monsoon rains caused flooding in several areas of Pakistan, including Shahdadkot and other small cities in Sindh and Punjab. Heavy rains caused the Meeru Khan Canal in Qamber-Shahdadkot district to overflow and breach its embankments, resulting in flooding in several nearby villages. The floods damaged homes, crops, and livestock, and disrupted communications and transportation. An inquiry was launched to determine the cause and prevent similar incidents.

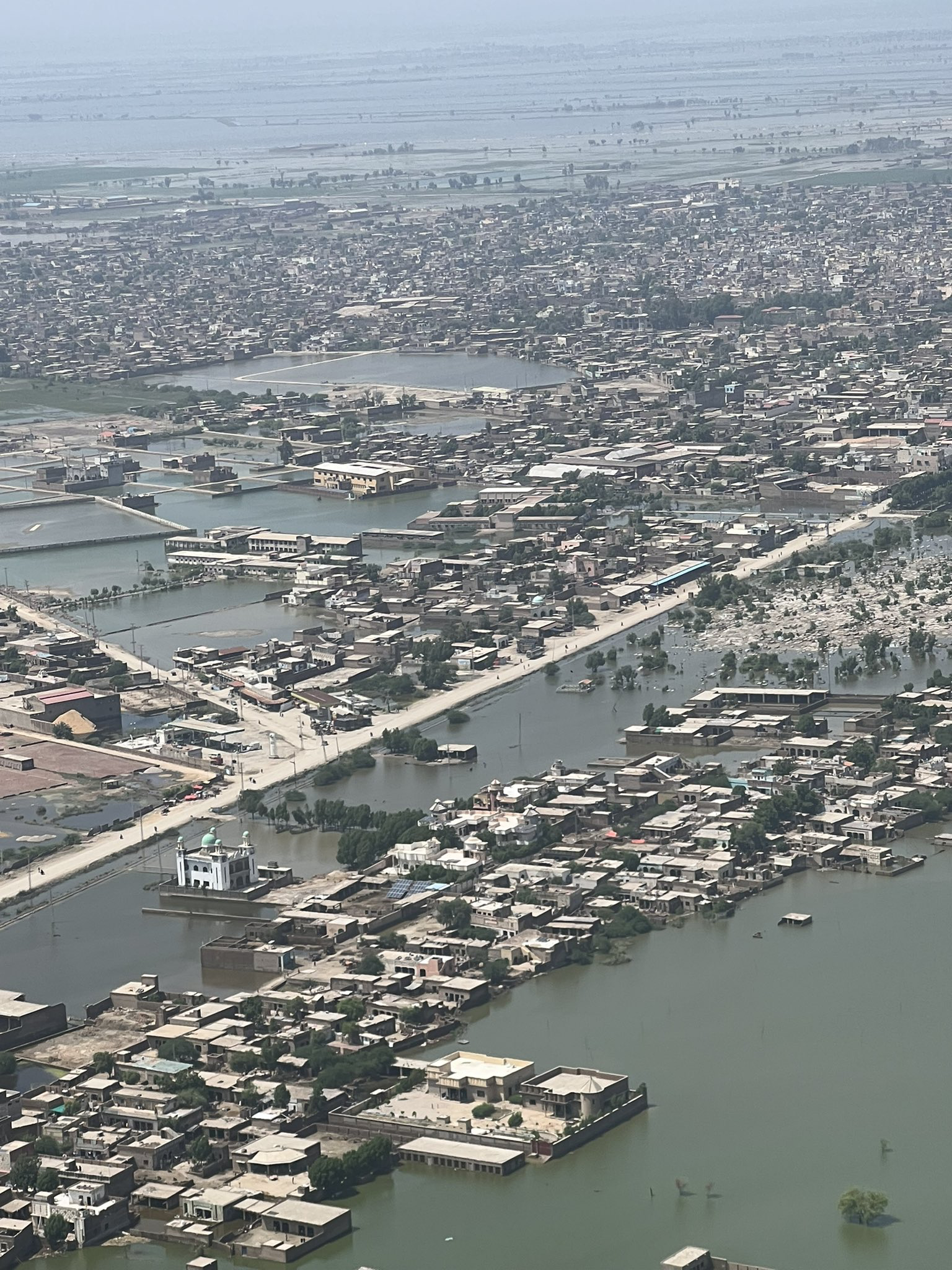
An aerial view of Shahdadkot city covered with floodwater in September 2022.

Local authorities and rescue teams provided relief and evacuated affected communities, but faced challenges due to the scale of the disaster. Deputy Commissioner Javed Nabi Khoso distributed food items among people affected by floods in the Katcha area of Qubo Saeed Khan. The distribution was carried out on behalf of the Provincial Disaster Management Authority.

Floods caused significant damage to property and infrastructure and affected millions of people. The government made efforts to rescue those affected, but many are still waiting for relief.

== Sports ==
Cricket is the main sports played by the majority of the citizens besides that Football is also prevalent when Sindh Balochistan inter provincial tournaments are held.

There is one official Cricket stadium where Cricket tournaments are held over the course of one year and many local clubs compete in such tournaments.

Volleyball can be seen played mostly in country sides in the evenings. Soccer is also played amongst kids in local schools.

== Notable people ==
- Mian Ghulam Siddique Mekan, Sufi saint
- Suman Pawan Bodani, first Hindu woman to become a civil judge

== See also ==
- Qubo Saeed khan Tehsil
- Larkana
- Umed Ali Junejo
- Kachi Pul
- Garhi Khairo
