= Shrine of Lal Shah Bari =

Pakistani sufi shrine

- لعل شاہ بری مزار
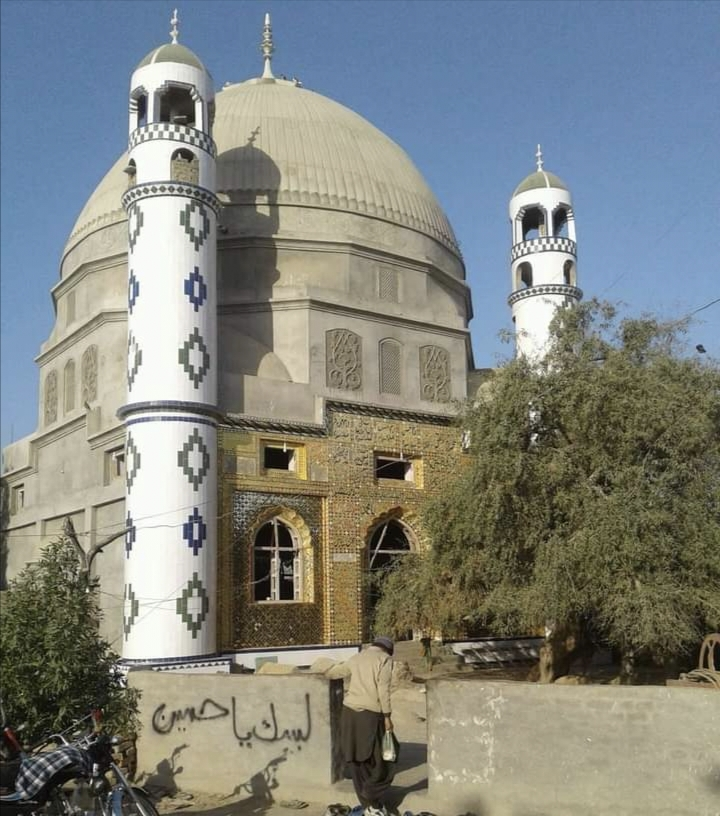
- Shrine of Lal Shah Bari is a Sufi shrine in the Sindh, Pakistan

Religion
- Affiliation: Islam
- District: Jacobabad
- Province: Sindh

Location
- Location: Lal Shah Bari, Dodapur Union council, Garhi Khairo Tehsil, Jacobabad District, Sindh, Pakistan
- Country: Pakistan
- Interactive map of Shrine of Lal Shah Bari
- Coordinates: 28°00′46″N 68°05′59″E

Architecture
- Type: Mosque and Sufi mausoleum
- Style: Indo-Islamic

Shrine of Lal Shah Bari is a 17th-century Sufi dargah shrine located in the settlement of Lal Shah Bari, in Garhi Khairo Tehsil, Jacobabad district of Sindh Province Pakistan.

== Saint Lal Shah Bari ==
Syed Lal Shah Bari was a prominent 17th-century Sufi saint whose spiritual legacy is deeply rooted in Sindh province, Pakistan. He was highly revered as a mystic figure of peace and devotion, drawing followers from across the region who sought spiritual blessings.

== Urs and Fair ==
The annual Urs is observed at the shrine every year with devotion and reverence; pilgrims travel from far and wide to pay their respects, and langar (free food) is distributed.

== Settlement Lal Shah Bari ==
Lal Shah Bari is a rural village in Doda Pur Union Council, Garhi Khairo Tehsil, Jacobabad District, Pakistan. It is located 13.2 km from the small town and UC of Doda Pur and 17.4 km from the town of Garhi Khairo.

The Shrine of Lal Shah Bari is one of the significant religious sites in this village; it is situated within the settlement of Lal Shah Bari.

This shrine is dedicated to the Sufi saint Pir Syed Lal Shah Bari and comprises both a mosque and the Sufi saint's mausoleum.

The Government Boys' Primary School Pir Lal Shah is also located in the Lal Shah Bari settlement, bearing the Sindh EMIS code 412010257.

== Geography ==
The shrine is situated in northern Sindh, Pakistan, at 28.0128 (28°0'46"N), 68.0997 (68°5'59"E).

== See also ==
- Garhi Khairo Tehsil
- Doda Pur
- Dil Sher Brohi
- Allahabad, Jacobabad
- Shrine of Shah Abdul Latif Bhittai
- Shrine of Lal Shahbaz Qalandar
- List of mausolea and shrines in Pakistan
- Sufism in Sindh
