= Umed Ali Junejo railway station =

Railway station in Pakistan

Umid Ali Junejo railway station

General information
- Owner: Ministry of Railways

Other information
- Station code: UAJ

History
- Former names: Great Indian Peninsula Railway

Umid Ali Junejo railway station (Urdu: امید علی جونیجو ریلوے اسٹیشن) is located in Village Umeed Ali Junejo in Qambar Shahdadkot District.

== After 2010 Floods ==
Most of the Railway Stations have been deserted and are occupied by the flood affected poor people who have made them as their shelter due to severe poverty.

== See also ==
- List of railway stations in Pakistan
- Pakistan Railways
