= Mian Ghulam Siddique Mekan =

- Born: 23 March 1844; Kanda, Nasirabad District, Balochistan, Pakistan
- Died: 28 May 1905; Shahdadkot, Pakistan
- Venerated in: Islam

Mian Ghulam Siddique Mekan (23 March 1844, Kanda, Nasirabad District, Balochistan - 28 May 1905, Shahdadkot) was a Muslim Scholar, Sufi saint of Qadri order and Poet of Shahdadkot, District Kamber, Sindh, Pakistan.

His father Allama Mian Noor Muhammad Mekan was chief Qazi in Kalat in the Court of Khan of Kalat Mir Mehrab Khan then Court of Mir Nasir Khan II then resigned in the rule of Mir Mir Khudadad Khan due his cuelity and came to Mian Hamid Huzuri Tunio (1798–1873)of Miro Khan, later on migrated to Shahdadkot in 1857 and established Madarsa. Mian Ghulam Siddique also got education from his father and became member of faculty of the Madarsa. Maulana Taj Muhammad Amroti was also student of said Madarsa.
