= Dil Sher Brohi =

Village in Sindh, Pakistan

Dil Sher Brohi دل شیر بروہی دل شير بروهي
- Village
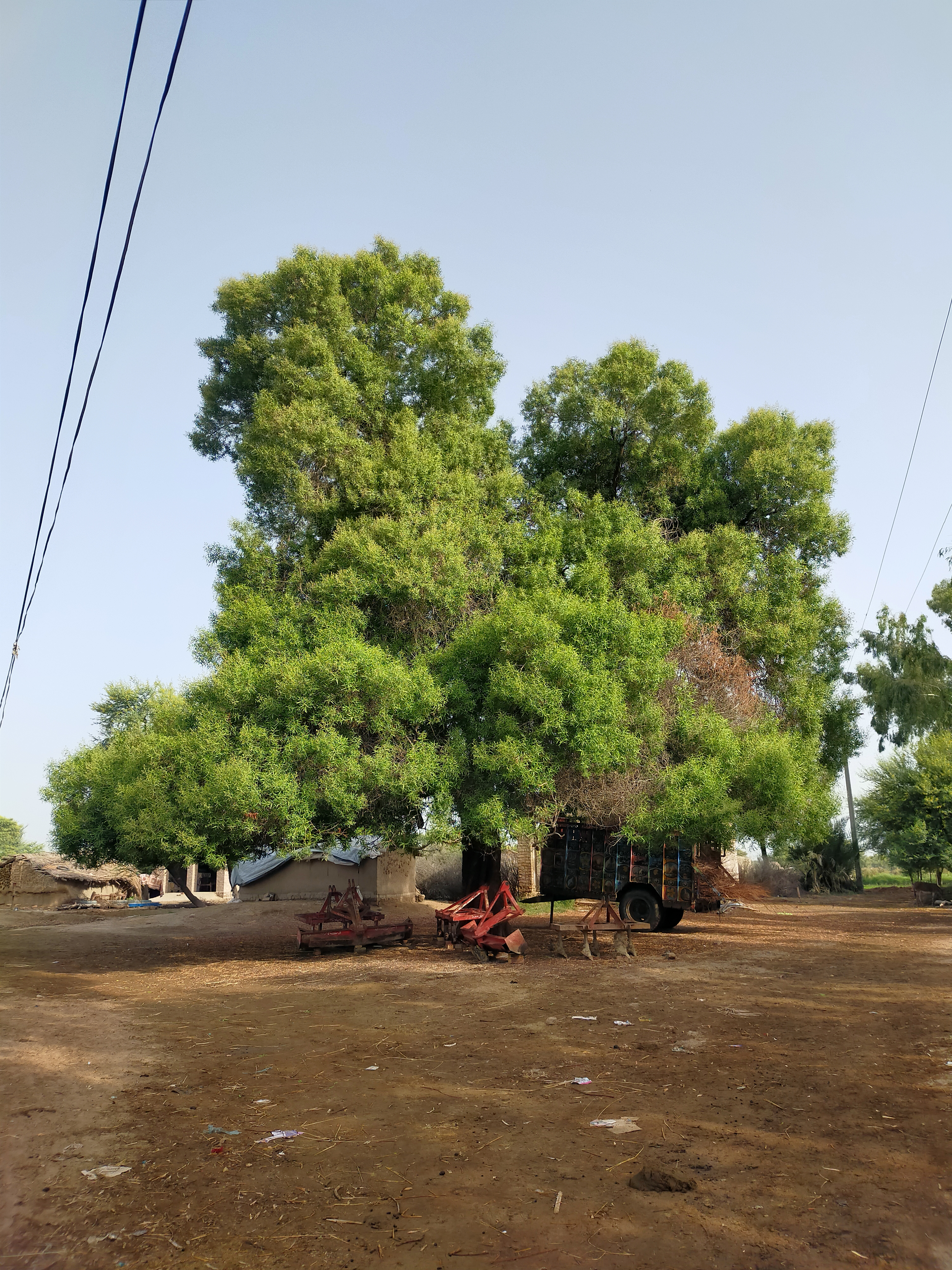
- Large, ancient Tree in the village Dil Sher Brohi.
- Interactive map of Dil Sher Brohi
- Coordinates: 28°02′44″N 68°04′17″E
- Country: Pakistan
- Province: Sindh
- District: Jacobabad District
- Tehsil: Garhi Khairo Tehsil
- Union Council: Allahabad

Population
  - Total: 1,400
- Time zone: UTC+05:00 (PST)

Dil Sher Brohi also spelled Dilsher Brohi (Sindhi: دل شير بروهي, Urdu: دل شیر بروہی) is a rural village in the Jacobabad District of Sindh Province, Pakistan. It is located 5.2 km from the Shrine of Lal Shah Bari and 17.2 km from the town of Garhi Khairo.

== History and Economy ==
The settlement was established in 1974 by Dil Sher Brohi and his family. Prior to settling in the area, the family hailed from Qubo Saeed Khan, where their traditional livelihood centered on pastoralism specifically managing herds of sheep and goats alongside farming.

In 1974, after completing all necessary administrative and land acquisition procedures, the family purchased land within the boundaries of Union Council Allahabad, establishing the modern residential layout of the village.

Over the subsequent decades, the community has developed into a tightly knit agrarian locality defined by the seasonal crop cycles of northern Sindh. The economic foundation of the village rests heavily on agriculture, which follows a dual harvesting framework. During the summer monsoon season, the surrounding fields are dedicated to rice cultivation. As the season transitions into the cooler winter months, agricultural output shifts to wheat, mustard, and various fruit orchards. Furthermore, the locality is characterized by ecological density, featuring a notable abundance of indigenous trees spread extensively both within the residential core and across the perimeter of the village lands.

== Administration and Infrastructure ==
Dil Sher Brohi is administratively located within the Allahabad Union Council (UC) of the Garhi Khairo Tehsil, situated in the Jacobabad District of northern Sindh.

The village houses public educational infrastructure regulated by the provincial state authorities. The Sindh Education and Literacy Department of the Government of Sindh operates the Lund Mugheri @ Dil Sher Brohi Government Boys Primary School (GBPS) within the settlement, cataloged under the official SEMIS institutional tracking registry system.

== Geography ==
The village is situated in northern Sindh, Pakistan, at 28.04558 (28°2'44"N), 68.07152 (68°4'17"E).

== Mosque ==
The village features a Sunni mosque that follows the Hanafi school of thought, named Jamia Masjid Ghousia Dil Sher Brohi. Congregational prayers are offered five times daily, with Friday prayers held at 1:45 PM.

== Education ==
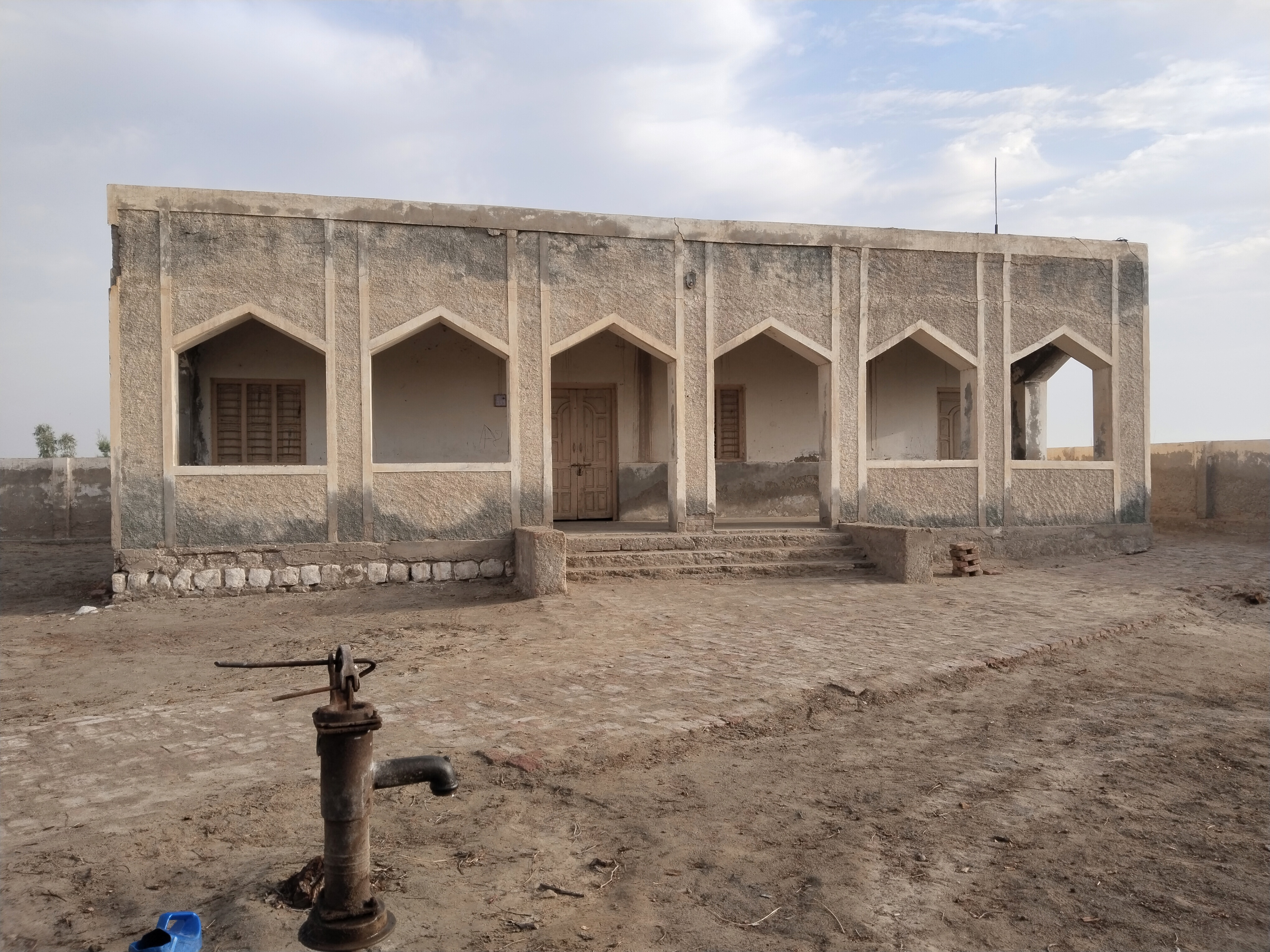
Dil Sher Brohi primary school

The Lund Mugheri @ Dil Sher Brohi Government boys primary school is located in the village. This school is under the jurisdiction of the School Education and Literacy Department of the Government of Sindh.

== Climate ==
The village experiences extreme weather, with summers reaching up to 52 °C and winters dropping to 2 °C.

== See also ==
- Jacobabad District
- Garhi Khairo Tehsil
- Allahabad, Jacobabad
- Shrine of Lal Shah Bari
- Doda Pur
