= Garhi Khairo railway station =

Railway station in Pakistan

Garhi Khairo Railway Station ڳڙهي خيرو ريلوي اسٽيشن

General information
- Coordinates: 28.0694°N 67.9870°E
- Owner: Ministry of Railways

Other information
- Station code: GRK
Location

Garhi Khairo Railway Station (Urdu: گڑھی خیرو ریلوے اسٹیشن, Sindhi: ڳڙھي خيرو ریلوي اسٽیشن) is located in Garhi Khairo Tehsil, Pakistan.

== See also ==
- List of railway stations in Pakistan
- Pakistan Railways
- Garhi Khairo Tehsil
- Jacobabad District
