= Allahabad, Jacobabad =

Allahabad
- Union council, Deh and village
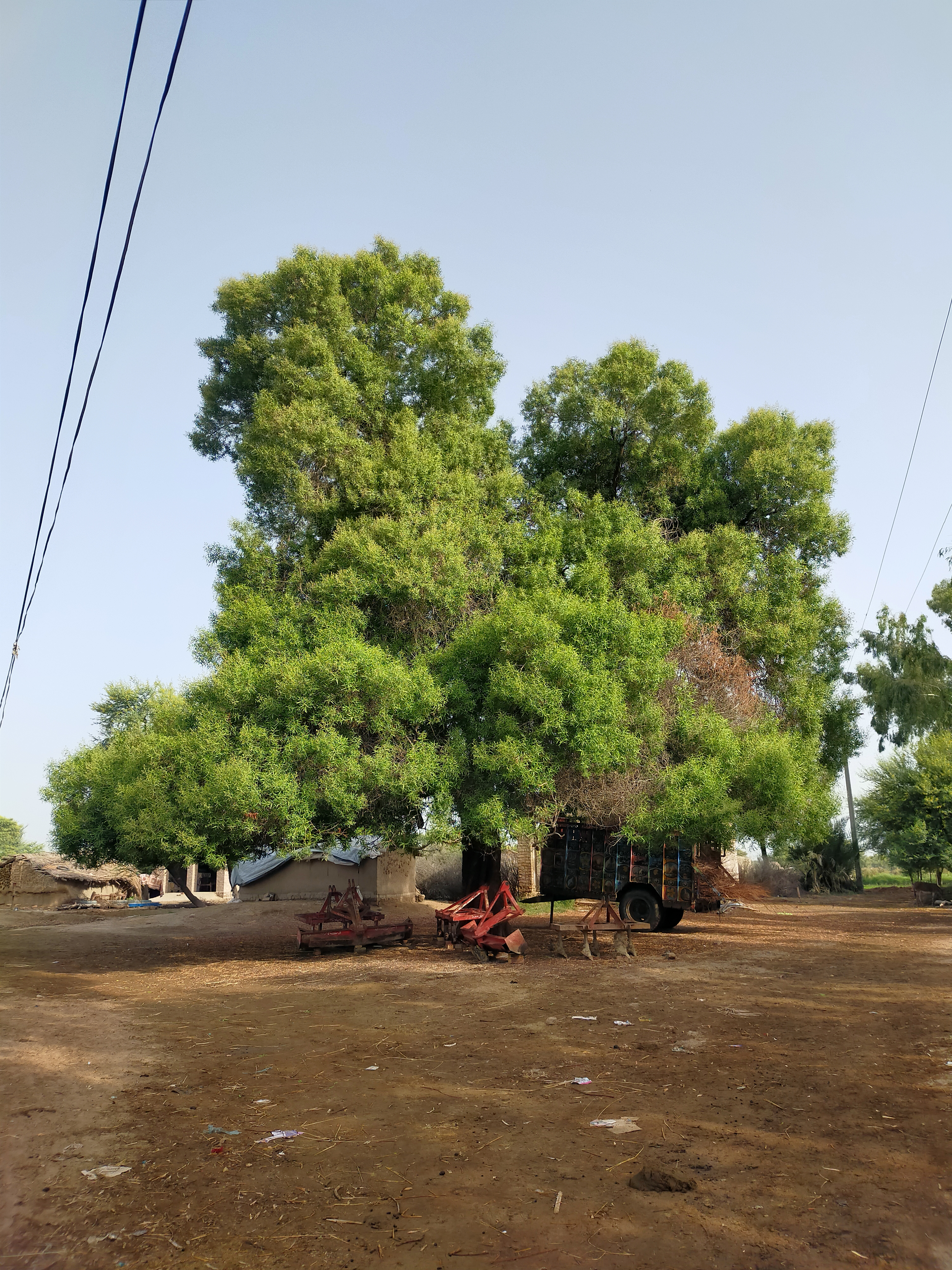
- A large tree in the village of Dil Sher Brohi, within the Allahabad Union Council
- Interactive map of Allahabad
- Coordinates: 28.0502°N 68.0509°E
- Country: Pakistan
- Province: Sindh
- Division: Larkana Division
- District: Jacobabad District
- Tehsil: Garhi Khairo Tehsil

Allahabad is a Union council, Revenue deh, and Rural village in Garhi Khairo Tehsil, Jacobabad District, Sindh Province, Pakistan. In the educational records of the Sindh government, Allahabad is clearly listed as District: Jacobabad, Tehsil: Garhi Khairo, and UC: Allahabad.

== Geography ==
Allahabad is situated in the rural agricultural area of Garhi Khairo Taluka. According to the geographical map, the settlements of Dil Sher Brohi, Qutub Khan Brohi, Sono Khan Umrani, Allah Rakhio Brohi and other smaller localities are found in the vicinity of Allahabad.

The settlement and Shrine of Lal Shah Bari are located to the southeast of the Allahabad area, while Dil Sher Brohi is situated within the Allahabad Union Council (UC).

== Education ==
Allahabad Union Council has a wide network of government primary schools. In the school directory of the Sindh government, many schools of different villages and settlements are clearly listed under Allahabad UC.

in them:

- GBPS Allahabad
- GBPS Umar Babar
- GBPS Mehrab Umrani
- GBPS Jaffarabad
- GBPS Lund Mugheri @ Dil Sher Brohi
- GBPS Haji Mitho Khan Brohi
- GBPS Ghulam Jan Khan Brohi

are included.
