= Mona Syedan =

Village in Pakistan's Punjab Province

Coordinates: 32°27′15″N 73°08′00″E

Mona Syedan (مونہ سیداں) is a village situated in Malakwal Tehsil of Mandi Bahauddin District in Pakistan's Punjab Province. The primary income source of the residents is land cultivation.

There is a government primary school in the village, with four teachers and 132 students.

== Etymology and history ==
It is traditionally believed that Syed Ali Miran Al Naqvi migrated with his family members from Lahore in or around the year 1650 AD. This area of Mona was at the time controlled by Raja Mona, a local Hindu Janjua ruler. The area of Mona was known then by the name of Raja-Nagar which was heavily under the influence of Hindus, the remains of ancient ruins of old temples can still be found in and around the locality. Syed Ali Miran Al Naqvi is said to have influenced Raja Mona, who converted to Islam. Raja Mona gifted a large area of the land he possessed to Ali and requested that he remain there. The area then became known as Mona for the Sadaat; and over time it was referred to as Mona Syedan (The Syed's Mona).

== Remount Mona Depot ==
Remount Depot Mona is the biggest functional Remount Installation in the world. It is a setup with landscaping of lush green fields, trees and charges. This Horsemen Paradise is spread over 10,000 acres. It is a living Museum and an establishment of Pakistan Army. This place has a unique Wildlife, natural Fauna and Flora of extra ordinary species. In 1902, the whole set up was relocated from India to its present location. The name Mona was given due to the village of Mona Syedan which is located north of the depot. This land which the Depot occupies today was gifted by the local Syeds at the end of the 18th century to the government.

== Mona Daphar Plantation Forest ==
Located in Mona Syedan is the second largest man-made forest in Pakistan, the area of the forest is over 7000 acres.

The area was a typical dry tropical forest known as ‘Rakh’ before it was felled from 1882 to 1901. The original vegetation consisted mainly of Van (Salvadora oleoides), Jand (Prosopis cineraria), Karir (Capparis decidua), Mallah (Zizyphus nummularia), Ber (Zizyphus mauritiana), Chamror (Ehretia laevis), Rehru (Acacia leucophloea), Lahura (Tecoma undulata), Frash (Tamarix aphylla), and Kangu (Lycium europaeum). These species occurred in groves and patches with sufficient space in between. The general height of the trees varied from 15 feet to 30 feet (4.5m to 9m). There were mounds and depressions. The mounds were covered with xerophytic species while Dhak (Butea monosperma), Lasura (Cordia dichotoma), Jangli-anar (Punica granatum), and Phagwara (Ficus palmata), were found in depressions. A few trees of kikar and shisham could also be found in relatively favourable sites. Presently Shisham and Mulberry are the principal species growing in mixture over a major portion of the plantation area. Other species growing are Eucalyptus, hybrid-poplar, semal, bakain and kiker. Bamboo are also grown on an experimental basis. Every year about 300 acres are being afforested/regenerated.

== Land ownership to the government ==
In or around 1880 there was an incident in which a local family from the tribe of Panjhuta were accused of stealing a horse from a British government official in the area. The tehsildar arrived and confronted the family that was alleged to have stolen the horse. They denied any knowledge of this, and did not accept this allegation.

To please the British official the tehsildar placed a circle on the map confiscating a large amount of the land of the people in this area. It is estimated that this land was in the region of 10,000 Acres. The owners of this land happened to be families who had no link to the theft. Many families suffered this injustice, including the syeds and local gondal, and jatt families.

== Population ==
The principal clans of Mona Syedan are the Syed's (Sadaat), then Choudary, Gondal, jatt, are various other clans. Most own land and have businesses, while others are farmers. Many have settled abroad in United Kingdom, Europe, USA and around the Middle East. It is estimated that the population is in the region on 15,000 (made up of 3000 syed's, 6000)
