= Kachi Pul =

Kachi Pul کچی پل ڪچي پل
- Town
- Flag

- Location of Kachi Pul
- Coordinates: 27°53′09″N 67°37′46″E
- Country: Pakistan
- Province: Sindh
- District: Qamber-Shahdadkot
- Local Languages: Sindhi, Siraiki, Balochi, Brohi

Kachi Pul is a small town in Qubo Saeed Khan, Qamber Shahdadkot District in Sindh province of Pakistan, situated near the border of Sindh and Balochistan at the distance of 1/2 km from Ratodero Guader Motorway (M-8) and 7 km from Qubo Saeed Khan town.

The town links Balouchistan and Sindh.
