= Pakistani village life =

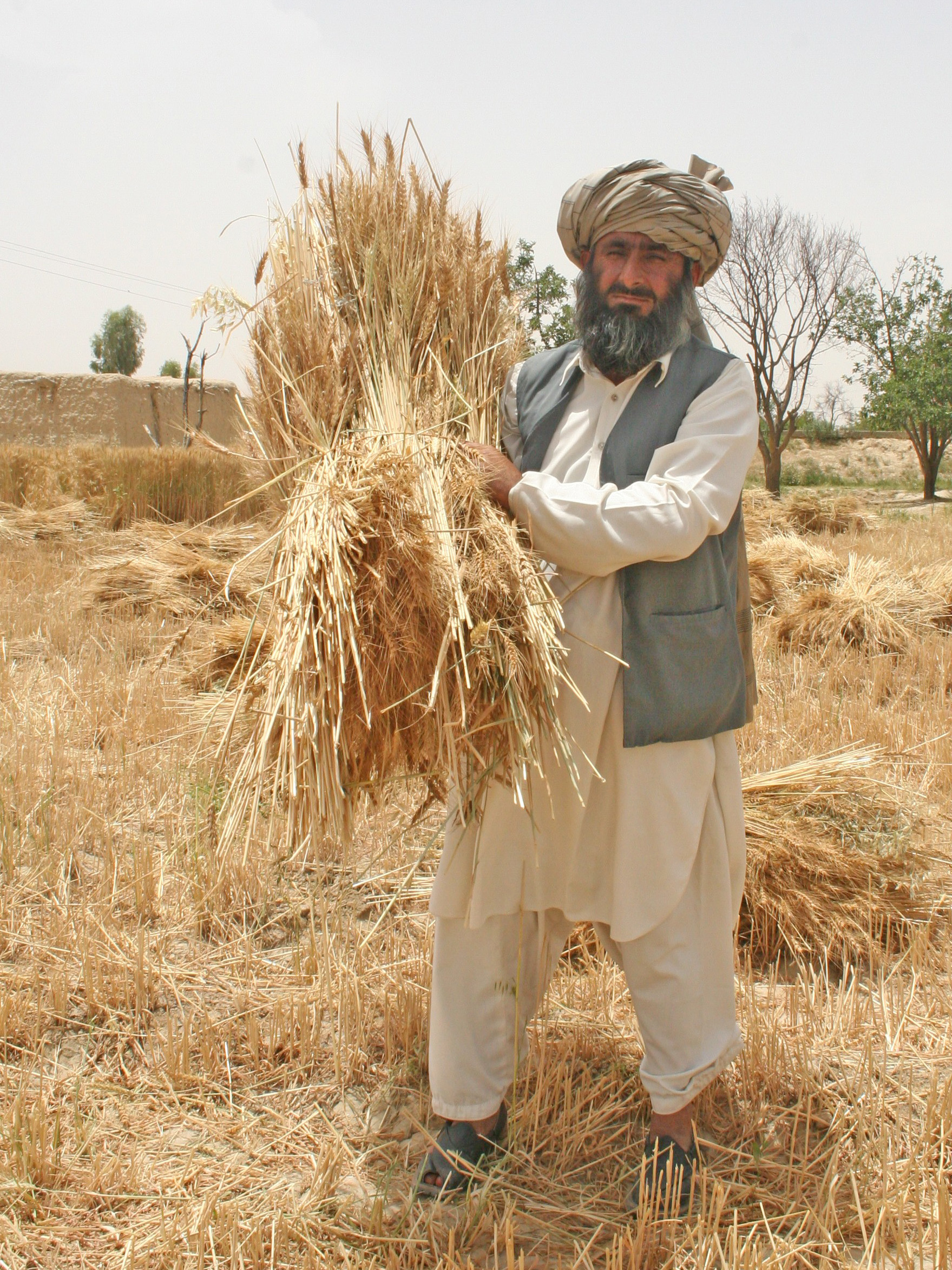
A Pakistani farmer in the village of Mahool Baloch in the Loralai district

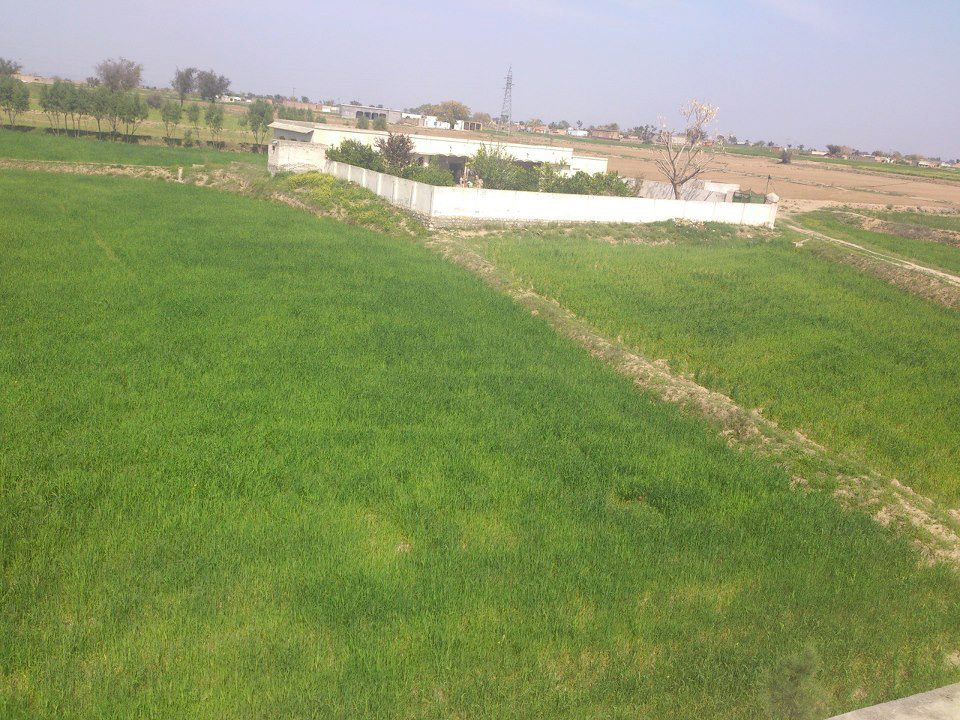
Waqar Ahmed house, Khuian district (کھوئیاں), Chakwal village of Pakistan

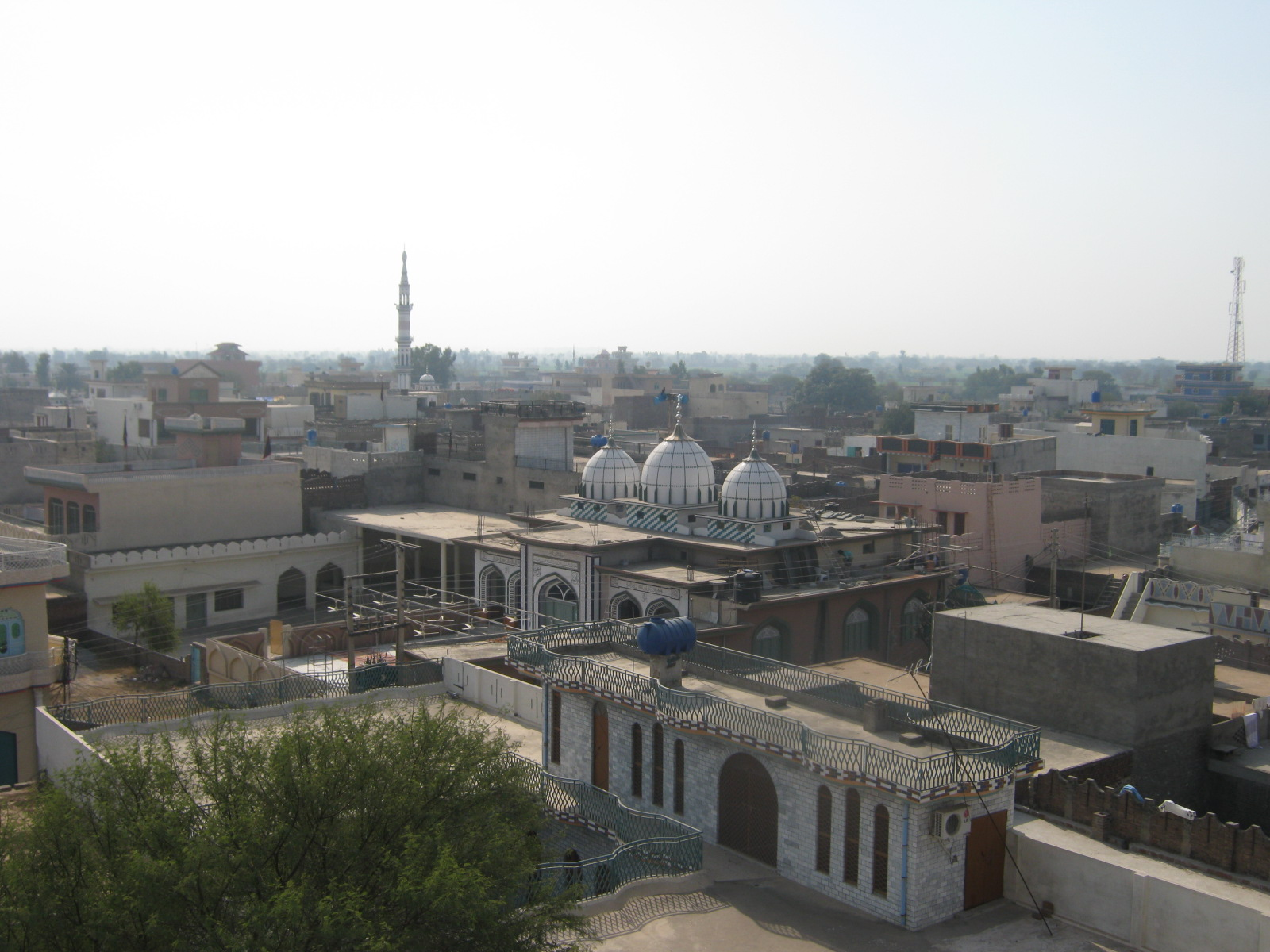
Amra Kalan village in Kharian, Pakistan

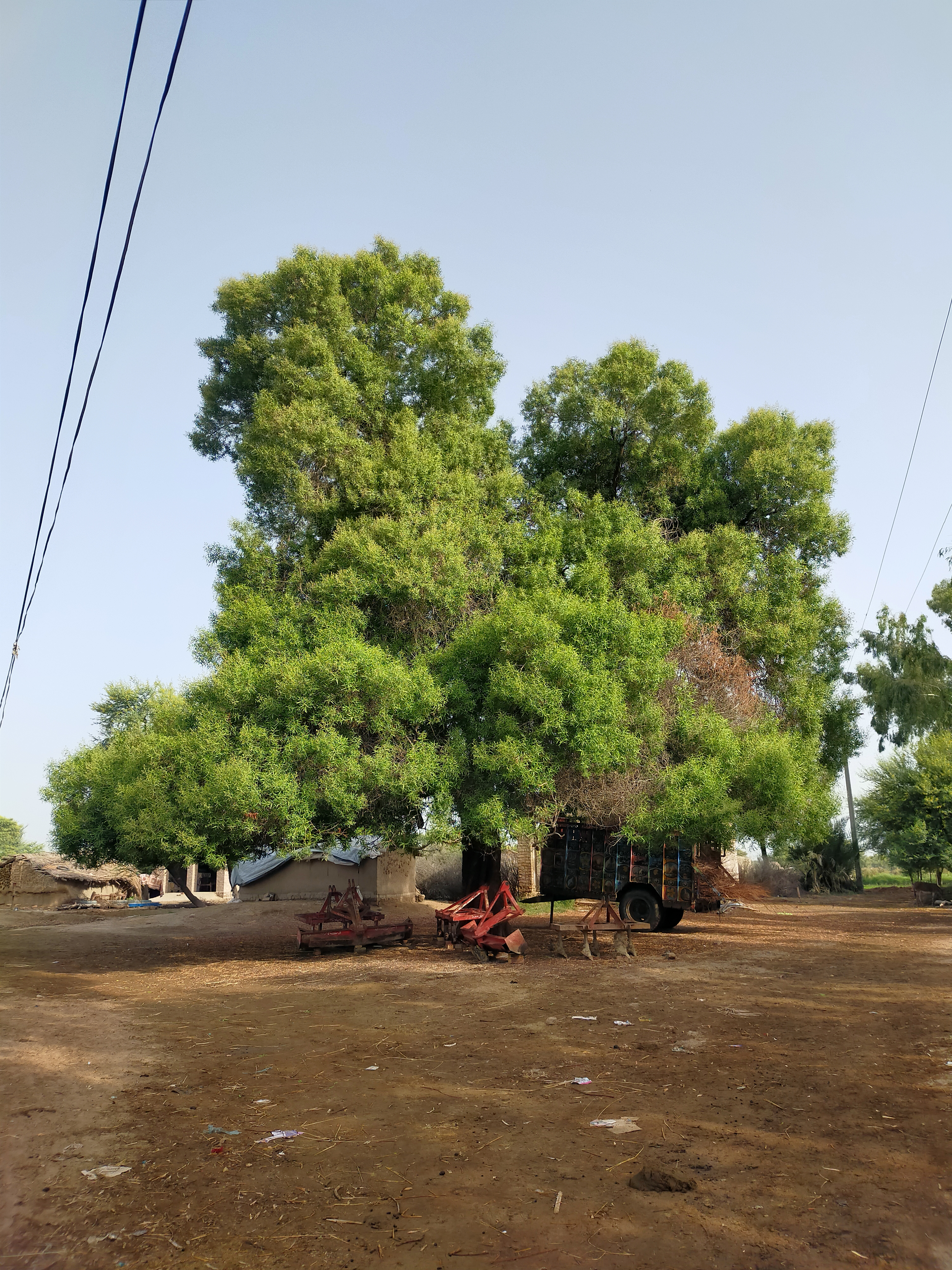
Large, ancient Tree in the village of Dil Sher Brohi in the Jacobabad district

Pakistani village life (Urdu: پاکستانی گاؤں کی زندگی) is the traditional rural life of the people of Pakistan.

People in villages usually live in houses made of bricks, clay, or mud. These typically have two or three rooms that house extended families. Although many village inhabitants now prefer living in separate homes for each family (nuclear units), they live in close proximity to their relatives, extending their villages by building more homes. Due to geographical and other socioeconomic diversity, different regions have slightly different physical and social layouts. For example, in Gongrani, Balochistan, people live in homes built within cliff-side caves that are connected by walkways. Most of the villagers are farmers, but other rural occupations include blacksmiths, hairdressers, and tailorers, shepherds.

Rural social organization in Pakistan is marked by kinship and exchange relations. Socioeconomic status among rural Pakistani villagers is often based upon the ownership of agricultural land, which may also may provide social prestige in village cultures. The majority of rural Pakistani inhabitants livelihoods is based upon the rearing of livestock, which also comprises a significant part of Pakistan's gross domestic product. Some livestock raised by rural Pakistanis include cattle and goats.

The traditional culture of the village is now subject to change due to the effects upon village society due to rural urbanization, and from the introduction of electricity and modern technology, such as pumps and tube wells for irrigation. Resistance to social and cultural changes exists among many Pakistani village inhabitants, and varying methods of managing these changes have been tried.
