= Garhi Khairo Tehsil =

Coordinates: 28°04′N 67°59′E

Garhi Khairo Tehsil تعلقہ گڑھی خیرو ڳڙهي خيرو تعلقو
- Taluka (Tehsil)
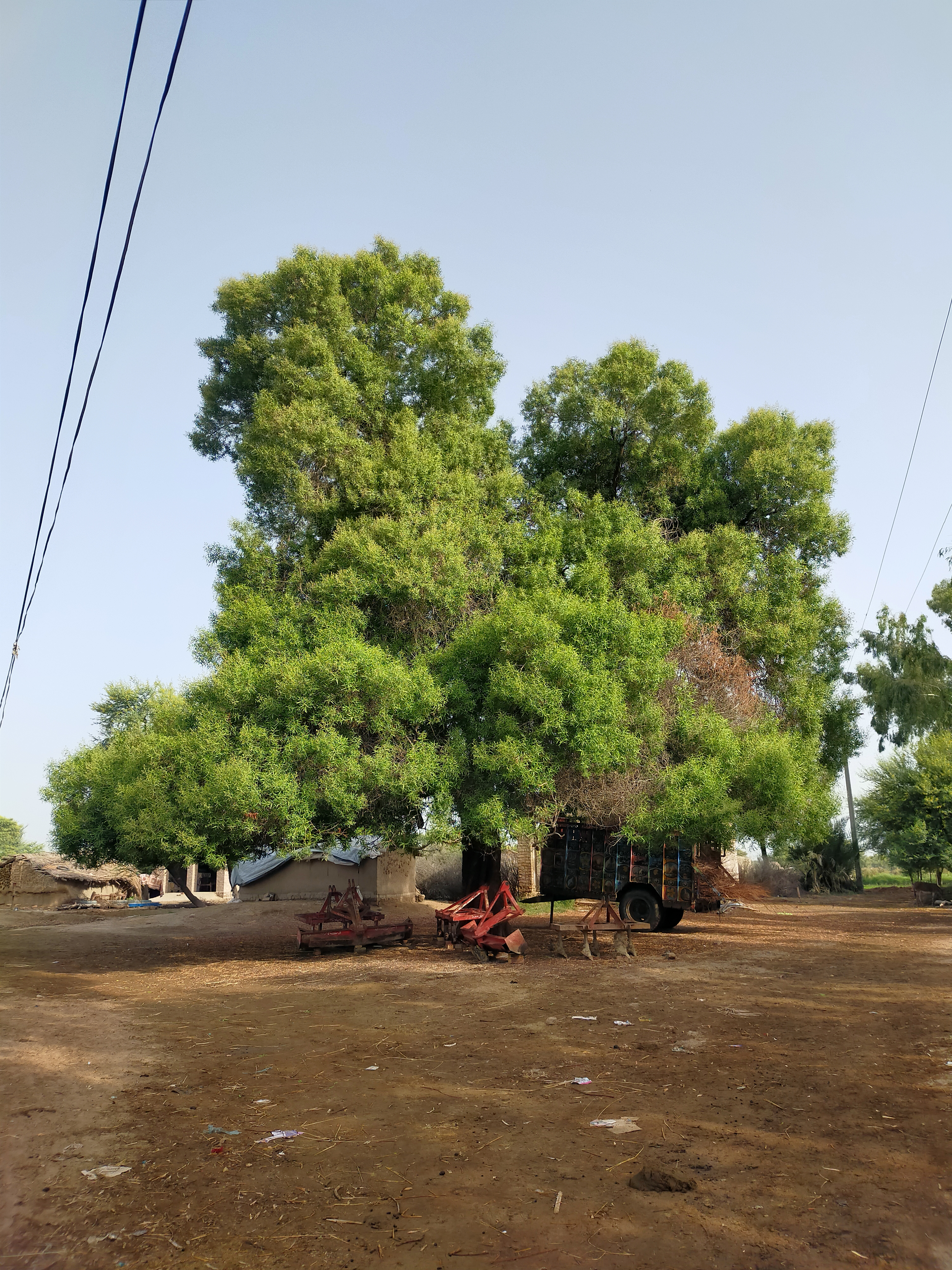
- Large tree in the village of Dil Sher Brohi, Allahabad UC, Garhi Khairo Tehsil.
- Interactive map of Garhi Khairo Tehsil
- Country: Pakistan
- Province: Sindh
- Division: Larkana Division
- District: Jacobabad District

Area
  - Taluka (Tehsil): 733 km^{2} (283 sq mi)

Population (2023)
  - Taluka (Tehsil): 193,297
  - Density: 264/km^{2} (683/sq mi)
  - Urban: 20,007 (10.35%)
  - Rural: 173,290 (89.65%)

Literacy (2023)
  - Literacy rate: 45.58%
- Post Code: 79050

Garhi Khairo (Sindhi: ڳڙهي خيرو) is a town and tehsil in Jacobabad District Sindh. According to 2023 census population of Garhi Khairo Tehsil is 193,297. Garhi Khairo is connected with Jacobabad, Ratodero, Shahdadkot, It also shares Sindh border with Balochistan from Usta Muhammad side.

== Demographics ==
=== Population ===
Historical population
Year	Pop.	±% p.a.
1951	45,934	—
1961	51,048	+1.06%
1972	73,878	+3.42%
1981	102,236	+3.68%
1998	117,207	+0.81%
2017	159,019	+1.62%
2023	193,297	+3.31%

As of the 2023 census, Garhi Khairo Tehsil has population of 193,297.

== See also ==
- Garhi Khairo railway station
- Garhi Khairo
- Dil Sher Brohi
- Shrine of Lal Shah Bari
- Allahabad, Jacobabad
- Jacobabad District
