= List of members of the 14th Provincial Assembly of Sindh =

This is the list of current members of the Provincial Assembly of Sindh elected following the 2013 general election.

Constituency	Name	Party	Reference
PS-62	Sharjeel Memon	Pakistan Peoples Party	
PS-76	Abdul Aziz Junejo	Pakistan Peoples Party	
PS-16	Hazar Khan Bijarani	Pakistan Peoples Party	
PS-92	Abdul Haseeb (politician)	Muttahida Qaumi Movement	
PS-54	Abdul Karim Soomro	Pakistan Peoples Party	
PS-18	Abdul Rauf Khoso	Pakistan Peoples Party	
PS-22	Abdul Sattar Rajper	Pakistan Peoples Party	
PS-12	Abid Hussain Bhayo	Pakistan Peoples Party	
PS-118	Adnan Ahmed (politician)	Muttahida Qaumi Movement	
PS-84	Aijaz Ali Shah Sheerazi	Pakistan Muslim League (N)	
PS-53	Ajiaz Hussain Shah Bukhari	Pakistan Peoples Party	
PS-70	Ali Mardan Shah	Pakistan Peoples Party	
PS-6	Ali Nawaz Khan Mehar	Pakistan Peoples Party	
PS-56	Allah Bux Talpur	Pakistan Peoples Party	
PS-85	Amir Haider Shah Sheerazi	Independent	
reserved seat for minorities	Arif Masih Bhatti	Muttahida Qaumi Movement	
PS-14	Aurangzaib Panhwar	Pakistan Peoples Party	
PS-4	Awais Qadir Shah	Pakistan Peoples Party	
PS-41	Aziz Ahmed Jatoi	Pakistan Peoples Party	
PS-55	Bashir Ahmed Halepoto	Pakistan Peoples Party	
reserved seat for minorities	Diwan Chand Chawla	Muttahida Qaumi Movement	
PS-63	Dost Muhammad Rahimoon	Pakistan Peoples Party	
PS-28	Bahadur Khan Dahri	Pakistan Peoples Party	
PS-31	Muhammad Rafique	Pakistan Muslim League (F)	
PS-71	Sikandar Ali Shoro	Pakistan Peoples Party	
reserved seat for minorities	Engineer Pesu Mal	Pakistan Peoples Party	
PS-115	Faisal Rafiq	Muttahida Qaumi Movement	
PS-72	Faqir Dad Khoso	Pakistan Peoples Party	
PS-82	Faraz Dero	Pakistan Peoples Party	
PS-26	Faseeh Ahmed Shah	Pakistan Peoples Party	
PS-77	Fayaz Ali Butt	Pakistan Peoples Party	
PS-17	Ghulam Abid Khan	Pakistan Peoples Party	
PS-39	Ghulam Mujtaba Isran	Pakistan Peoples Party	
PS-127	Ghulam Murtaza Baloch	Pakistan Peoples Party	
PS-27	Ghulam Qadir Chandio	Pakistan Peoples Party	
PS-19	Ghulam Rasool Khan Jatoi	National Peoples Party	
PS-75	Ghulam Shah Jeelani	Pakistan Peoples Party	
reserved seat for minorities	Giyanoo Mal	Pakistan Peoples Party	
reserved seat for minorities	Hargun Das Ahuja	Muttahida Qaumi Movement	
PS-89	Humayun Muhammad Khan	Pakistan Muslim League (N)	
PS-3	Ikramullah Khan Dharejo	Pakistan Peoples Party	
PS-52	Imdad Ali Pitafi	Pakistan Peoples Party	
PS-11	Imtiaz Ahmed Shaikh	Pakistan Peoples Party	
PS-119	Irtiza Khalil Farooqui	Muttahida Qaumi Movement	
PS-47	Jam Khan	Pakistan Peoples Party	
PS-81	Jam Madad Ali Khan	Pakistan Peoples Party	
PS-101	Jamal Ahmed	Muttahida Qaumi Movement	
PS-91	Kamran Akhter	Muttahida Qaumi Movement	
PS-105	Khalid Bin Vilayat	Muttahida Qaumi Movement	
PS-112	Khurrum Sher Zaman	Pakistan Tehreek-e-Insaf	
PS-38	Khursheed Ahmed Junejo	Pakistan Peoples Party	
reserved seat for minorities	Lal Chand Ukrani	Pakistan Peoples Party	
PS-46	M.Rashid Khilji	Muttahida Qaumi Movement	
PS-106	Mahfooz Yar Khan	Muttahida Qaumi Movement	
PS-62	Makhdoom Khalil-u-Zaman	Pakistan Peoples Party	
PS-44	Makhdoom Rafik Zaman	Pakistan Peoples Party	
PS-96	Mazahir Amir Khan	Muttahida Qaumi Movement	
PS-116	Mehmood Abdul Razzaque	Muttahida Qaumi Movement	
PS-66	Mir Haji Muhammad Hayat Khan Talpur	Pakistan Peoples Party	
PS-40	Mir Nadir Ali Khan Magsi	Pakistan Peoples Party	
PS-103	Muhammad Abdur Rauf Siddiqui	Muttahida Qaumi Movement	
PS-100	Muhammad Adil Siddiqui	Muttahida Qaumi Movement	
PS-37	Muhammad Ali Khan Bhutto	Pakistan Peoples Party	
PS-87	Muhammad Ali Malkani	Pakistan Peoples Party	
PS-107	Muhammad Azeem Farooqui	Muttahida Qaumi Movement	
PS-8	Muhammad Bux Khan Mahar	Pakistan Peoples Party	
PS-110	Muhammad Dilawar	Muttahida Qaumi Movement	
PS-45	Muhammad Dilawar Qureshi	Muttahida Qaumi Movement	
PS-95	Muhammad Hussain Khan	Muttahida Qaumi Movement	
PS-108	Muhammad Jawaid	Pakistan Peoples Party	
PS-111	Muhammad Kamran	Muttahida Qaumi Movement	
PS-125	Muhammad Moin Aamir Pirzada	Muttahida Qaumi Movement	
PS-117	Muhammad Qamar Abbas Rizvi	Muttahida Qaumi Movement	
PS-30	Muhammad Rashid Shah	Pakistan Muslim League (F)	
PS-130	Muhammad Sajid Jokhio	Pakistan Peoples Party	
PS-1	Muhammad Saleem Rajput	Muttahida Qaumi Movement	
PS-10	Muhammad Shaharyar Khan Mahar	Pakistan Muslim League (F)	
PS-90	Muhammad Yousaf Shahwani	Muttahida Qaumi Movement	
PS-13	Mumtaz Hussain Khan	Pakistan Peoples Party	
PS-121	Nadeem Razi	Muttahida Qaumi Movement	
PS-34	Naeem Ahmed Kharal	Pakistan Peoples Party	
reserved seat for minorities	Nand Kumar	Pakistan Muslim League (F)	
PS-2	Nasir Hussain Shah	Pakistan Peoples Party	
PS-42	Nawab Ghaibi Sardar Khan Chandio	Pakistan Peoples Party	
PS-68	Nawab Muhammad Taimur Talpur	Pakistan Peoples Party	
PS-120	Nishat Muhammad Zia Qadri	Muttahida Qaumi Movement	
PS-67	Noor Ahmed Bhurgri	Pakistan Peoples Party	
PS-74	Pir Mujeeb ul Haq	Pakistan Peoples Party	
PS-104	Rehan Zafar	Muttahida Qaumi Movement	
PS-49	Sabir Hussain (politician)	Muttahida Qaumi Movement	
PS-78	Saeed Khan Nizamani	Pakistan Muslim League (F)	
PS-94	Saifuddin Khalid	Muttahida Qaumi Movement	
PS-25	Saleem Raza Jalbani	Pakistan Peoples Party	
PS-113	Samar Ali Khan	Pakistan Tehreek-e-Insaf	
PS-109	Saniya Naz	Pakistan Peoples Party	
PS-124	Sardar Ahmad	Muttahida Qaumi Movement	
PS-129	Shafi Muhammad Jamot	Pakistan Muslim League (N)	
PS-86	Shah Hussain Shah Sheerazi	Pakistan Muslim League (N)	
PS-83	Shahid Abdul Salam Thahim	Pakistan Peoples Party	
PS-123	Sheeraz Waheed	Muttahida Qaumi Movement	
PS-97	Sheikh Abdullah (politician)	Muttahida Qaumi Movement	
PS-15	Sohrab Khan Sarki	Pakistan Peoples Party	
PS-102	Syed Anwar Raza	Muttahida Qaumi Movement	
PS-122	Syed Khalid Ahmed	Muttahida Qaumi Movement	
PS-20	Syed Murad Ali Shah (politician)	Pakistan Peoples Party	
PS-21	Syed Serfraz Hussain Shah	Pakistan Peoples Party	
PS-52	Syed Zai Abbas Shah	Pakistan Peoples Party	
PS-24	Tariq Masood Arain	Pakistan Peoples Party	
PS-128	Waqar Hussain Shah	Muttahida Qaumi Movement	
PS-79	Waryam Faqqeer	Pakistan Muslim League (F)	
PS-98	Waseemuddin Qureshi	Muttahida Qaumi Movement	
PS-64	Zaffar Ahmed Khan Kamali	Muttahida Qaumi Movement	
PS-23	Zia-ul-Hassan	Pakistan Peoples Party	
PS-48	Zubair Ahmed Khan	Muttahida Qaumi Movement	
reserved seat for women	Sumeta Afzal Syed	Muttahida Qaumi Movement	
reserved seat for women	Sorath Thebo	Pakistan Muslim League (N)	
reserved seat for women	Shazia Jawaid	Muttahida Qaumi Movement	
reserved seat for women	Shamim Mumtaz	Pakistan Peoples Party	
reserved seat for women	Shaheena Sher Ali	Pakistan Peoples Party	
reserved seat for women	Shahnaz Ansari	Pakistan Peoples Party	
reserved seat for women	Seema Zia	Pakistan Tehreek-e-Insaf	
reserved seat for women	Sajeela Leghari	Pakistan Peoples Party	
reserved seat for women	Saira Shahliani	Pakistan Peoples Party	
reserved seat for women	Rukhsana Shah	Pakistan Peoples Party	
reserved seat for women	Rehana Leghari	Pakistan Peoples Party	
reserved seat for women	Rana Ansar	Muttahida Qaumi Movement	
reserved seat for women	Nusrat Sultana	Pakistan Peoples Party	
reserved seat for women	Nusrat Seher Abbasi	Pakistan Muslim League (F)	
reserved seat for women	Naila Munir	Muttahida Qaumi Movement	
reserved seat for women	Naheed Begum	Muttahida Qaumi Movement	
reserved seat for women	Mahtab Akbar Rashdi	Mahtab Akbar Rashdi	
reserved seat for women	Kulsoom Akhtar Chandio	Pakistan Peoples Party	
reserved seat for women	Khairunisa Mughal	Pakistan Peoples Party	
reserved seat for women	Irum Azeem Farooque	Muttahida Qaumi Movement	
reserved seat for women	Iram Khalid	Pakistan Peoples Party	
reserved seat for women	Heer Soho	Muttahida Qaumi Movement	
reserved seat for women	Ghazala Siyal	Pakistan Peoples Party	
reserved seat for women	Farhat Seemi	Pakistan Peoples Party	
reserved seat for women	Bilqees Mukhtar	Muttahida Qaumi Movement	
reserved seat for women	Aisha Khatoon	Muttahida Qaumi Movement	
reserved seat for women	Rubina Saadat Qaim Khani	Pakistan Peoples Party	
reserved seat for women	Sharmila Farooqi	Pakistan Peoples Party	
reserved seat for women	Shehla Raza	Pakistan Peoples Party	

== See also ==
- List of members of the 15th Provincial Assembly of Sindh
