= NA-250 Karachi Central-IV =

Constituency of the National Assembly of Pakistan

- Constituency for the National Assembly of Pakistan
- Region: Nazimabad Town (partly) and North Nazimabad Town of Karachi Central District in Karachi
- Electorate: 553,540

Current constituency
- Party: MQM-P
- Member: Farhan Chishti
- Created from: NA-256 Karachi Central-IV

NA-250 Karachi Central-IV (این اے-250، کراچی وسطی-4) is a constituency for the National Assembly of Pakistan that covers North Nazimabad.

== Assembly Segments ==
Constituency number	Constituency	District	Current MPA	Party
129	PS-129 Karachi Central-VIII	Karachi Central	Hafiz Naeem ur Rehman	JI
130	PS-130 Karachi Central-IX	Karachi Central	Jamal Ahmed	MQM-P

== Members of Parliament ==
=== 2018–2023: NA-256 Karachi Central-IV ===
Election	Member	Party
2018	Najeeb Haroon	PTI

=== 2024–present: NA-250 Karachi Central-IV ===
Election	Member	Party
2024	Farhan Chishti	MQM–P

== Election 2002 ==
General elections were held on 10 October 2002. Kanwar Khalid Younus of Muttahida Qaumi Movement won by 51,696 votes.

General election 2002: NA-245 Karachi Central-VII
Party	Candidate	Votes	%	±%
MQM	Kunwar Khalid Yunus	51,696	50.45	
MMA	Syed Munawwar Hassan	41,947	40.93	
PPP	Muhammad Haseen	3,232	3.15	
Others	Others (five candidates)	5,606	5.47	
Turnout		103,587	40.50	
Total valid votes		102,481	98.93	
Rejected ballots		1,106	1.07	
Majority		9,749	9.52	
Registered electors		255,754		
MQM hold				

== Election 2008 ==
General elections were held on 18 February 2008. Farhat Mohammad Khan of Muttahida Qaumi Movement won by 149,157 votes.

General election 2008: NA-245 Karachi Central-VII
Party	Candidate	Votes	%	±%
MQM	Farhat Mohammad Khan	149,157	88.61	
PPP	Qazi Muhammad Bashir	15,392	9.14	
Others	Others (three candidates)	3,779	2.25	
Turnout		169,169	49.18	
Total valid votes		168,328	99.50	
Rejected ballots		841	0.50	
Majority		133,765	79.47	
Registered electors		344,004		
MQM hold				

== Election 2013 ==
General elections were held on 11 May 2013. Muhammad Rehan Hashmi of Muttahida Qaumi Movement won by 115,776 votes and became the member of National Assembly.

General election 2013: NA-245 Karachi Central-VII
Party	Candidate	Votes	%	±%
MQM	Muhammad Rehan Hashmi	115,776	58.91	
PTI	Muhammad Riaz Haider	54,937	27.95	
JI	Mairajul Huda Siddiqui	22,452	11.42	
Others	Others (ten candidates)	3,381	1.72	
Turnout		208,552	54.46	
Total valid votes		196,546	94.24	
Rejected ballots		12,006	5.76	
Majority		60,839	30.96	
Registered electors		382,932		
MQM hold				

== By-Election 2016 ==
By-Election 2016: NA-245 Karachi Central-VII
Party	Candidate	Votes	%	±%
MQM	Muhammad Kamal	39,576	86.15	
PPP	Shahid Hussian	3,111	6.77	
PTI	Amjad Ullah Khan	1,498	3.26	
Others	Others (thirteen candidates)	1,755	3.82	
Turnout		45,940	11.26	
Total valid votes		45,940	100	
Rejected ballots		0	0	
Majority		36,465	79.38	
Registered electors		407,867		
MQM hold				

== Election 2018 ==
General elections were held on 25 July 2018.

General election 2018: NA-256 Karachi Central-IV
Party	Candidate	Votes	%	±%
PTI	Najeeb Haroon	89,850	45.18	
MQM-P	Amir Waliuddin Chishti	45,575	22.92	
MMA	Mairajul Huda Siddiqui	22,364	11.25	
PML(N)	Dost Muhammad Faizi	9,221	4.64	
TLP	Mufti Muhammad Ali Qadri	9,144	4.60	
PSP	Muhammad Adil Siddiqui	9,030	4.54	
PPP	Sajid Hasan	7,587	3.82	
Others	Others (nine candidates)	6,095	3.05	
Turnout		201,984	41.25	
Total valid votes		198,866	98.46	
Rejected ballots		3,118	1.54	
Majority		44,275	22.26	
Registered electors		489,665		
PTI gain from MQM-P				

== Election 2024 ==
General elections were held on 8 February 2024. Farhan Chishti won the election with 79,925 votes.

General election 2024: NA-250 Karachi Central-IV
Party	Candidate	Votes	%	±%
MQM-P	Farhan Chishti	79,925	42.43	▲19.51
JI	Hafiz Naeem ur Rehman	43,659	23.18	N/A
PTI	Muhammad Riaz Haider (Note: Filed nomination papers as PTI candidate but ECP allowed him to run as an Independent)	37,629	19.98	▼25.20
Independent	Jowhar Abid	5,906	3.14	N/A
PPP	Khuwaja Sohail Mansoor	5,720	3.04	▼0.78
Others	Others (twenty candidates)	15,525	8.24	
Turnout		191,042	34.51	▼6.74
Total valid votes		188,364	98.60	
Rejected ballots		2,678	1.40	
Majority		36,266	19.25	
Registered electors		553,540		
MQM-P gain from JI				

== See also ==
- NA-249 Karachi Central-III
- NA-251 Sherani-cum-Zhob-cum-Killa Saifullah
