= Ejaz =

Ejaz may refer to:

== Places ==
- Ejaz, Idlib, a village in Syria

== People ==
=== Surname ===
- Abdullah Ejaz, Pakistani model and actor
- Ali Ejaz (1941–2018), Pakistani actor
- Gohar Ejaz, Pakistani real estate tycoon and philanthropist
- Nayyar Ejaz (born 1969), Pakistani actor
- Sanna Ejaz, Pakistani Pashtun human rights activist
- Shagufta Ejaz (born 1965), Pakistani actress
- Shamim Ejaz (1923–2009), Pakistani newscaster

=== Given name ===
- Sheikh Ejaz Ahmad (1940–1998), Pakistani politician and businessman
- Ijaz Ahmed (disambiguation), several people
- Ejaz Ali, Indian social worker, doctor, journalist, and politician
- Ejaz Ali (footballer) (born 1963), Pakistani footballer
- Ejaz Hussain Bukhari, Pakistani politician
- Ejaz Chaudhary (born 1956), Pakistani politician
- Ejaz Ahmed Chowdhury (1945–2022), Bangladeshi general
- Ejaz Durrani (1935–2021), Pakistani film actor, director and producer
- Ejaz Khan, Pakistani politician
- Ejaz Afzal Khan, Pakistani jurist
- Ejaz Ahmad Khan, Pakistani former Guantanamo Bay detainee
- Ejaz Lakdawala, Indian alleged gangster
- Ejaz Qaiser (1952–2020), Pakistani singer
- Ejaz Yousaf (born 1952), Pakistani jurist

== See also ==
- Aijaz, a given name
- Ajaz, a given name
- I'jaz, an Islamic doctrine
