= List of Gujarat cricketers =

This is a list of cricketers who have played first-class, List A or Twenty20 cricket for Gujarat cricket team. Seasons given are first and last seasons; the player did not necessarily play in all the intervening seasons. Players in bold have played international cricket.

== A ==
- Essof Ashroff, 1953/54

== C ==
- Nilesh Chaudhary, 2007/08

== D ==
- Bharat Desai, 1959/60
- J. Desai, 1971/72
- Chiranjit Dhir, 1988/89
- Walter D'Souza
- Fakir Dungaria, 1991/92

== G ==
- Chintan Gaja, 2016/2023
- Dhiren Gajjar, 1978/79, 1981/82

== K ==
- HA Khan, 1953/54

== M ==
- Hiralal Macchi, 1981/82

== P ==
- Alshaaz Pathan, 2015/16

== T ==
- Abhinav Tandel, 2017/18

== Z ==
- Pankaj Zaveri
- Hasubhai Zinzuwadia
