= Sehgal =

Sehgal, also spelled Segal, Saigol, Sahgal or Saigal, is a Punjabi Khatri surname, originating from Punjab in India and Pakistan.

== Notable people ==
=== Art ===
- Amarnath Sehgal (1922–2007), Indian sculptor
- Deep Sehgal, British filmmaker
- Kabir Sehgal, American composer, navy officer and financial executive
- Kiran Segal (born 1944), Indian classical dancer
- Ikram Sehgal (born 1946), Pakistani Army officer, security expert and defence analyst
- Ramesh Saigal, Indian film director, producer, screenwriter and actor
- Nayantara Sahgal (born 1927), Indian author
- Tino Sehgal (born 1976), British-German artist of Indian origin

=== Business ===
- Azam Saigol (1951–2018), Pakistani businessman and politician
- Rafique Saigol (1933–2003), Pakistani businessman and politician
- Vivek Chaand Sehgal (born 1957), Indian-Australian billionaire businessman

=== Entertainment ===
- Akashdeep Saigal (born 1974), Indian TV actor, BiggBoss contestant
- Amit Saigal (1965–2012), Indian rock musician
- Baba Sehgal (born 1965), rapper and actor
- Dhruv Sehgal (born 1990), Indian actor, writer and director
- K. L. Saigal (1904–1947), Indian actor and singer
- Mohit Sehgal (born 1985), Indian actor
- Monica Sehgal (born 1990), Indian actress
- Parvati Sehgal (born 1990), Indian actress
- Sayyeshaa Saigal (born 1997), Indian actress
- Sharmin Segal, Indian actress
- Shashikala Saigal (1932–2021), Indian actress
- Sonal Sehgal (born 1981), Indian actress
- Sonnalli Seygall (born 1989), Indian actress and model
- Sumeet Saigal (born 1966), Indian actor
- Zohra Sehgal (1912–2014), Indian actress, dancer and choreographer

=== Freedom struggle ===
- Lakshmi Sahgal (1914–2012), Indian Independence revolutionary
- Manmohini Zutshi Sahgal (1909–1994), Indian freedom fighter
- Prem Sahgal (1917–1992), Indian independence activist, served in the Azad Hind Fauj

=== Law and journalism ===
- Gita Sahgal (born 1956), Indian writer and journalist
- Parul Sehgal (born 1981), American literary critic, editor and columnist at The New York Times Book Review
- Rubina Saigol (1955–2016), Pakistani feminist scholar and activist
- Sabina Sehgal Saikia (1963–2008), Indian food journalist
- Sangita Dhingra Sehgal (born 1958), Indian judge

=== Politics ===
- Amar Singh Sahgal (1903–1970), Indian politician

=== Science ===
- Amita Sehgal, American molecular biologist at the University of Pennsylvania
- Bittu Sahgal (born 1947), Indian environmental activist, writer and conservationist
- Narender K. Sehgal (1940–2020), Indian physicist, scientific administrator, and science populariser
- Sunil Saigal, Indian-born American engineer, dean of the Newark College of Engineering
- Surendra Nath Sehgal (1932–2003), Indian-American microbiologist and pharmaceutical scientist
- Suri Sehgal (born 1934), Indian-American crop scientist, seedsman, philanthropist

=== Sports ===
- Ravi Sehgal (born 1971), Indian cricketer

== See also ==
- Sahgalabad, a small town in Chakwal District, Punjab, Pakistan
- Saigol Group (pronounced as Sehgal Group), a group of companies owned by the Saigol family in Pakistan
- Segal (company), human resources consulting firm headquartered in New York
