= Musayev =

Musayev, Musaev, Muzayev or Muzaev (Russian: Мусаев, Музаев) is a Russian-language masculine patronymic surname originating from the masculine given name Musa by the addition of the Slavic patronymic suffix '-ev'. Its feminine counterparts are Musayeva, Musaeva, Muzayeva or Muzaeva. The surname may refer to

- Bakhtiyar Musayev (born 1973), Azerbaijani football midfielder
- Beibulat Musaev (born 1977), Belarusian wrestler
- Fakhraddin Musayev (1957–1992), Azerbaijani military officer
- Fozil Musaev (born 1989), Uzbekistani footballer
- Leon Musayev (born 1999), Russian football player
- Magomed Musaev (born 1989), Russian-Kyrgyzstani freestyle wrestler
- Mardan Musayev (1907–1982), Azerbaijani Red Army officer
- Murad Musayev (born 1983), Russian football coach
- Naila Musayeva (born 1957), Azerbaijani scientist
- Niyameddin Musayev (born 1940), Azerbaijani pop singer
- Olokhan Musayev (born 1979), Azerbaijani Paralympian athlete
- Richard Muzaev (born 1992), Russian tennis player
- Ruslan Musayev (born 1979), Azerbaijani football player
- Salman Musayev (born 1958), Azerbaijani Islamic scholar and mufti
- Samir Musayev (born 1979), Azerbaijani football player
- Sevgil Musayeva, journalist from Crimea
- Shahin Musayev, Deputy Minister of Defense of Azerbaijan
- Tarlan Musayeva (born 1955), Azerbaijani politician
- Vahid Musayev (died 1999), Deputy Minister of Defense of Azerbaijan
- Shahzoda (Zilola Musayeva, born 1979), Uzbek singer and actress

== See also ==
- Moussaieff
