= Muhammad Rehan Hashmi =

Pakistani politician

- محمدریحان ہاشمی

Member of the National Assembly of Pakistan
- In office 2013–2016
- Preceded by: Farhat Mohammad Khan
- Constituency: NA-245 (Karachi-VII)

Personal details
- Born: 16 December 1973 (age 52) Karachi, Sindh, Pakistan

Muhammad Rehan Hashmi (Urdu: محمد ریحان ہاشمی; born 16 December 1973) is a Pakistani politician who was a member of the National Assembly of Pakistan from October 2012 to 2016.

== Early life ==
He was born on 16 December 1973.

== Professional career ==
He has diversified experience spanning management, human resources, strategic policy development & had served in a Foreign Trade Mission as an Advisor & was engaged in Bilateral Trade & Investment facilitation.

He was appointed as Chairman of Pakistan Red Crescent Society Sindh in April 2025 by Governor Sindh. Engaged with educational institutions, Sports Associations & Youth Development.

He is heading different sports to mobilize youth for promoting healthy activities. He is Chairman Sindh Taekwondo, Chairman Karachi Fencing Association, Chairman Sindh Kickboxing & other sports.

== Political career ==
He was elected unopposed to the National Assembly of Pakistan as a candidate of Muttahida Qaumi Movement (MQM) from Constituency NA-245 (Karachi-VII) in by-polls held in October 2012.

He was re-elected to the National Assembly as a candidate of MQM from Constituency NA-245 (Karachi-VII) in the 2013 Pakistani general election. He received 115,776 votes and defeated Muhammad Riaz Haider, a candidate of Pakistan Tehreek-e-Insaf (PTI).

In 2016, he resigned from the seat of the National Assembly to run in the election of the local government in Karachi.
