= Naila (disambiguation) =

Naila is a town in Bavaria, Germany.

Naila may also refer to:

- Naila (name), an Arabic female given name.
- Naila-Janjgir, a city and a municipality in Janjgir-Champa district, Chhattisgarh, India
- Naila (film), a 1965 Pakistani musical romance drama film

== See also ==
- Neyla (disambiguation)
- Nayla, a given name
