= Fakir (name) =

Fakir, Fakeer, or Faker is a masculine given name and surname of Arabic origin. As a surname, it may also take the definite article as Al Fakir. Notable people with the name include:

== Given name ==
=== Fakeer ===
- Fakeer Sher Muhammad Bilalani (born 1958), Pakistani politician

=== Faker ===
- Faker Boussora (born 1964), Tunisian-Canadian terrorist

=== Fakir ===
- Fakir of Ava (1813–1891), British-American stage magician
- Fakir Alamgir (1950–2021), Bangladeshi singer
- Fakir Azizuddin (1780–1845), Indian medical doctor, linguist, diplomat, and foreign minister
- Fakir Baykurt (1929–1999), Turkish author and trade unionist
- Fakir Dungaria (born 1969), Indian cricketer
- Fakir Aftabuddin Khan (1862–1933), Bengali musician, composer, and lyricist
- Fakir Muhammad Lashari (1951–1993), Pakistani journalist, poet, and intellectual
- Fakir Abdul Mannan (1901–1994), Bangladeshi lawyer
- Fakir Musafar (1930–2018), American performance artist
- Fakir Mohan Naik, Indian politician
- Fakir Mohan Senapati (1843–1918), Indian writer
- Fakir Mahbub Anam Swapan (born 1953), Bangladeshi politician and businessman
- Fakir Ram Tamta (born 1963), Indian politician
- Fakir Vaghela (1952–2013), Indian politician

== Surname ==
- Abdul "Duke" Fakir (1935–2024), American singer (Four Tops)
- Azan Fakir, Sufi saint and poet
- Allan Fakir (1932–2000), Pakistani folk singer
- Jamal Fakir (born 1982), French rugby league footballer
- Lalon Fakir (1772–1890), Bengali philosopher and author
- Nassim Al Fakir (born 1977), Swedish musician, presenter, comedian, and host
- Salem Al Fakir (born 1981), Swedish singer and musician

== See also ==
- Al Fakir (disambiguation)
- Fakir (disambiguation)
- Faqir (given name)
