= Khaled Ahmed (disambiguation) =

Khaled Ahmed or variant spellings may refer to:

- Khaled Ahmed (born 1992), Bangladeshi cricketer
- Khaled Ahmed (1943–2024), Pakistani journalist
- Khalid Ahmed, Pakistani TV director, producer and actor
- Khalid Ahmad (1943–2013), Pakistani Urdu poet and journalist
- Kafeel Ahmed (1979–2007), or Khaled Ahmad or Khalid Ahmed, an Indian terrorist
- Syed Khalid Ahmed (born 1965), Pakistani politician
- Khalid Ahmed Kharal (1939–2017), Pakistani politician
- Khaled Ahmed Musa (born 1972), Sudanese athlete
- Khalid Ahmed Mohamed (born 1976), a Bahraini sport shooter
- Khalid Ahmed Khan Lund, a Pakistani politician

== See also ==
- Khalid and variants, a name
