= Nishat (name) =

Nishat or Nishad is a unisex given name of Arabic origin. Notable people and places with this name include:

== Given name ==
=== Nishad ===
- Nishad Kumar (born 1999), Indian para high jumper
- Nishad Vaidya, Indian television actor

=== Nishat ===
- Nishat Afza (1940–2016), Pakistani politician
- Nishat Khan Daha (1948–2021), Pakistani politician
- Nishat Jubaida, Bangladeshi army general
- Nishat Khan (born 1960), Indian sitar player
- Nishat Majumdar (born 1981), Bangladeshi mountaineer
- Nishat Muhammad Zia Qadri (born 1966), Pakistani politician

== Places ==
- Nishat Bagh Nishat Bagh (Urdu: نشات باغ, is a terraced Mughal garden built on the eastern side of the Dal Lake, close to Srinagar in the state of Jammu and Kashmir, India. It is the second largest Mughal garden in the Kashmir Valley. The largest in area is the Shalimar Bagh, which is also located on the bank of the Dal Lake. ‘Nishat Bagh’ is Urdu, which means "Garden of Joy," "Garden of Gladness" and "Garden of Delight.
- Nishatpura railway station Bhopal Nishatpura (Station Code : NST) is a terminal railway station of Bhopal City, the capital of Madhya Pradesh. It is operated by West Central Railway.
- Nishatabad railway station Nishatabad railway station (Urdu: نشاط آباد ریلوے اسٹیشن ) is located in Pakistan.
