= Faqir (given name) =

Faqir is a masculine given name of Arabic origin. Notable people with the name include:

== Given name ==
- Faqir of Ipi (1897–1960), Pakistani tribal chief and adversary to the British Raj
- Faqir Chand Aggarwal (1932–2024), Indian politician
- Faqir Aizazuddin (1935–2017), Pakistani cricketer
- Faqir Hussain (died 2016), Pakistani footballer
- Faqir Chand Khanna, American physicist
- Faqir Dad Khoso (born 1957), Pakistani politician
- Faqir Mohammed (born 1970), Pakistani Taliban leader
- Faqir Nabi (1953–2020), Afghan film actor

== See also ==
- Al Fakir (disambiguation)
- Fakir (name)
