= Zubair Khan =

Zubair Khan may refer to:

- Zubair Khan (Indian politician) (born 1963), Indian National Congress politician
- Zubair Khan (Pakistani politician), member of the Provincial Assembly of Khyber Pakhtunkhwa
- Zubair Khan (cricketer) (born 1989), British cricketer
- Zubair Jahan Khan (born 1972), Pakistani squash player
- Zubair Ahmed Khan, Pakistani politician, member of the Provincial Assembly of Sindh
- Zubair Ahmad Khan, academic

== See also ==
- Mohammad Zubair Khan, economist
