= Naila (name) =

Nailah
- Gender: Female

Origin
- Origin: Arabic
- Meaning: "Gracious"

Other names
- Related names: Naelah, Nailah, Na'ila, Nayla

Naila or Na'ila (ِArabic: نائلة) is a female given name of Arabic origin meaning "gracious".

== Notable people ==
- Naila Al Atrash, Syrian actress and director
- Na'ila bint al-Furafisa, wife of third Rashidun caliph Uthman
- Naila Boss, British rapper
- Naila Faran, Saudi doctor
- Naila Hassan, New Zealand police officer
- Naila Isayeva, Azerbaijani pedagogue
- Naila Kabeer, Indian-Bangladeshi economist
- Naila Munir, Pakistani politician
- Naila Musayeva, Azerbaijani professor
- Naila Nayem, Bangladeshi model and actress
- Naila Nazir (cricketer), Pakistani cricketer
- Naila Nazir (flight attendant), Pakistani flight attendant

== See also ==
- Neyla (disambiguation)
- Nayla
