= Syed Ahmed =

Syed Ahmed may refer to:

- Syed Ahmed (businessman) (born 1974), British entrepreneur, businessman, contestant on The Apprentice
- Syed Ahmed (politician) (1945–2015), Indian politician
- Syed Ahmad Khan (1817–1898), Indian educator, politician, Islamic reformer and modernist
- Syed Ahmad Barelvi or Sayyid Ahmed Raibarelvi (1786–1831), Indian religious Islamic martyr
- Syed Anwar Ahmed (born 1991), Indian television actor and film producer
- Syed Haris Ahmed (born 1984), convicted U.S. conspirator linked to a 2006 Toronto terrorism case
- Syed Imran Ahmed (born 1962), Pakistani politician
- Syed Ishtiaq Ahmed (1932–2003), Bangladeshi lawyer and constitutionalist
- Syed Jamil Ahmed, Bangladeshi scholar and theatre director
- Syed Mobeen Ahmed, Pakistani politician
- Syed Mohammad Ahmed (born 1957), Pakistani screenwriter, lyricist, actor and director
- Syed Khaled Ahmed (born 1992), Bangladeshi cricketer
- Syed Khalid Ahmed (born 1965), Pakistani politician
- Syed Shoaib Ahmed (born 1996), Indian football striker
- Syed Sultan Ahmed (1880–1963), Indian barrister and politician
- Syed Imtiaz Ahmed (1954–2020), Indian cricketer
- Syed Refat Ahmed (born 1958), justice of the Bangladesh Supreme Court
- Syed Samsuddin Ahmed, academic from Bangladesh
