= Farooque (name) =

Farooque is a given name and surname. Notable people with the name include:

- Farooque Ahmed (born 1976), Pakistani American terrorist
- Irum Azeem Farooque (born 1967), Pakistani politician

== See also ==
- Farooque (1948–2023), Bangladeshi actor and politician
