= Mohammad Ali Shah (surgeon) =

Pakistani politician and sportsperson

Muhammad Ali Shah PP TI SI HI
- محمد علی شاہ

Provincial Minister of Sindh for Sports
- In office 3 May 2008 – November 2012
- Governor: Ishratul Ibad
- Chief Minister: Syed Qaim Ali Shah

Member of the Provincial Assembly of Sindh
- In office 2008–2013
- Constituency: PS-103 (Karachi-XV)

Personal details
- Born: 26 October 1946 Bareilly, United Provinces, British India
- Died: 4 February 2013 (aged 66) Houston, Texas, United States
- Resting place: Paposh Nagar Graveyard, Karachi
- Party: Muttahida Qaumi Movement
- Children: 2 including Imran
- Occupation: Politician
- Profession: Orthopedic surgeon
- Awards: see below

Syed Muhammad Ali Shah (Urdu: سید محمد علی شاہ) (26 October 1946 – 4 February 2013) was a Pakistani orthopaedic surgeon and member of the Pakistan Cricket Board governing board. He was the Provincial Sports Minister of Sindh. He was also the Chief de Mission for Pakistani athletes at the Commonwealth Games 2010.

== Early life ==
Shah was born on 26 October 1946 in Bareilly. His father, Syed Asghar Ali Shah, served as a judge for many years.

== Career ==
=== As surgeon ===
Shah returned to Pakistan from England to establish himself as an orthopedic surgeon in Karachi and soon set up his own orthopedic and trauma hospital, the AO Clinic. In his career he is estimated to have performed about 76,000 operations.

=== As politician ===
Shah was a member of the Muttahida Qaumi Movement. In the 2008 general election, he was elected to the Sindh Assembly from PS-103 (North Nazimabad, Karachi). He became Minister of Sports of the province of Sindh in 2008.

=== With cricket ===
Shah was also known for his passion for the sports of cricket. He devoted 10 per cent of the AO Clinic's revenues to supporting cricket in Pakistan, and in 1993 he established Asghar Ali Shah Cricket Stadium in North Nazimabad, Karachi. The stadium hosts the Dr Mohammad Ali Shah Night Twenty20 Cricket Tournament every year in the month of Ramadan.

In October 2012, Shah was credited as having played an instrumental role in reviving international cricket in the country after a period of three and a half years when, in his capacity as Sindh sports minister, he arranged an international world XI team – consisting of former and current players from Sri Lanka, South Africa, West Indies, United States and Afghanistan – to play two T20 matches against a "Pakistan All Stars" consisting mainly of players from the national team. While the matches were unofficial, they were seen as a milestone as this was the first instance when foreign players toured Pakistan to play cricket since the attack on the Sri Lankan team.

== 2010 Commonwealth Games opening ceremony flag controversy ==
The flag bearer for Pakistan at the opening ceremony was scheduled to be weight-lifter Shujauddin Malik but as the teams entered the stadium the chef de mission, Dr. Mohammad Ali Shah insisted on carrying the flag himself. Pakistan weightlifting manager Rashid Mehmood said the team had considered a boycott in protest at the actions of the official but later withdrew their threat after Pakistan Olympic Association chief, Arif Hasan, assured them Shah would be sanctioned for his actions.

== Awards ==
Year	Award	Category	Result	Note	Ref.
1996	Pride of Performance	Medical	Won	Awarded by Farooq Leghari, President of Pakistan	
2003	Tamgha-e-Imtiaz	Sports	Won	Awarded by Pervez Musharraf, President of Pakistan	
2009	Sitara-e-Imtiaz	Public Services	Won	Awarded by Asif Ali Zardari, President of Pakistan	
2013	Hilal-i-Imtiaz	Medicine, Social Welfare & Sports	Won	Awarded by Asif Ali Zardari, President of Pakistan	
