= Yar (name) =

Yar (Persian: یار) is a Persian name meaning "friend". Notable people with the name include:

- Ahmad Yar Khan (1902–1979), final Khan of Kalat
- Asfand Yar Khan Kakar, Pakistani politician
- Ali Ahmad Yar-zada (born 1985), Afghan footballer
- Cara Elizabeth Yar Khan, Anglo-Indian disability rights activist
- Dewan Shah Jahan Yar Chowdhury, Bangladeshi politician
- Khadija Aamir Yar Malik, Pakistani politician
- Mahfooz Yar Khan (born 1950), Pakistani politician
- Muhammad Yar Khan (died 1774), Nawab of Bareilly
- Muhammad Yar Shah (1913–1990), Pakistani Twelver cleric
- Nawab Alam Yar Jung Bahadur (1890–1974), Indian judge
- Pakhtoon Yar Khan, Pakistani politician
- Rahim Yar Khan (1858–1866), Nawab of Bahawalpur
- Saadat Yaar Khan Rangin (1757–1835), Indian Urdu poet
- Waheed Yar Khan (born 1942), Pakistani cricketer
- Yar Ali Khan, Bangladeshi politician
- Yar Mohammad Khan (1920–1981), Bangladeshi politician
- Zain Yar Jung (1889–1961), Indian architect
