= Aijaz =

Aijaz is a given name of Arabic origin. Notable people with the name include:

== Given name ==
- Aijaz Ahmad (1941–2022), Indian Marxist literary theorist and political commentator
- Aijaz Ahmad Mir (born 1986), Indian politician
- Aijaz Ali (born 1968), Pakistani born American cricketer
- Aijaz Ali Shah Sheerazi (died 2020), Pakistani politician
- Aijaz Aslam (born 1972), Pakistani actor
- Aijaz Haroon, Pakistani airline captain and managing director
- Aijaz Hussain Jakhrani (born 1967), Pakistani politician, member of the National Assembly of Pakistan
- Aijaz Siddiqi (1911–1978), Urdu writer and poet
