= Farhan Chishti =

Pakistani politician

- فرحان چشتی
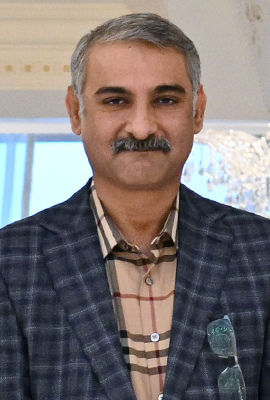

Member of the National Assembly of Pakistan
- Incumbent
- Assumed office 29 February 2024
- Constituency: NA-250 Karachi Central-IV

Personal details
- Born: Karachi, Sindh, Pakistan
- Party: MQM-P (2024-present)

Farhan Chishti is a Pakistani politician who has been a member of the National Assembly of Pakistan since February 2024. He won the 2024 election in the constituency of NA-250 belonging to the political party of MQM-P.

== Career ==
Chishti won the 2024 Pakistani general election from NA-250 Karachi Central-IV as a Muttahida Qaumi Movement – Pakistan candidate. He received 79,925 votes while the runner-up, Hafiz Naeem ur Rehman of Jamaat-e-Islami Pakistan, received 43,659 votes.
