= Neyla =

Neyla may refer to:

- Neyla Pekarek (born 1986), American musician
- "Neyla", a 2012 song by Fady Maalouf
- Constable Neyla, a fictional character in Sly Cooper

== See also ==
- Naila (disambiguation)
- Naila (name)
- Nayla, a given name
