= PS-130 Karachi Central-IX =

Constituency of the Provincial Assembly of Sindh, Pakistan

- Constituency for the Provincial Assembly of Sindh
- Region: North Nazimabad Town and New Karachi Town (partly) of Karachi Central District in Karachi
- Electorate: 269,634

Current constituency
- Member: Vacant
- Created from: PS-101 Karachi-XIII (2002-2018); PS-130 Karachi Central-VIII (2018-2023)

PS-130 Karachi Central-IX (پی ایس-130، کراچی وسطی-9) is a constituency of the Provincial Assembly of Sindh.

== General elections 2024 ==
Provincial election 2024: PS-130 Karachi Central-IX
Party	Candidate	Votes	%	±%
MQM-P	Jamal Ahmed	38,884	43.25	
JI	Haris Ali Khan	19,366	21.54	
PTI	Syed Faisal Ali (Note: Filed nomination papers as PTI candidate but ECP allowed him to run as an independent)	19,089	21.23	
Independent	Ayaz Ahmed Ghori	3,079	3.43	
PPP	Muhammd Rizwan	1,964	2.18	
TLP	Shahrukh Zafar	1,707	1.90	
Independent	Naseem Akhtar	1,497	1.67	
Others	Others (twenty six candidates)	4,324	4.80	
Turnout		90,858	40.41	
Total valid votes		89,910	98.96	
Rejected ballots		948	1.04	
Majority		19,518	21.71	
Registered electors		224,825		
MQM-P gain from PTI				

== General elections 2018 ==
Provincial election 2018: PS-130 Karachi Central-VIII
Party	Candidate	Votes	%	±%
PTI	Muhammad Riaz Haider	38,356	36.80	
MQM-P	Jamal Ahmed	33,984	32.60	
MMA	Muhammad Nasim Siddiqui	10,768	10.33	
PSP	Khurram Fayaz	9,178	8.80	
TLP	Qazi Muhammad Abbas	5,047	4.84	
PPP	Atif Mushtaq	2,625	2.52	
PML(N)	Muhammad Jahan Zaib Alam	2,524	2.42	
APML	Muhammad Tahir	496	0.48	
ANP	Niamat Khalil	491	0.47	
NP	Ghulam Nabi Brohi	281	0.27	
Independent	Syed Tehzeeb Akmal Shah	208	0.2	
PP	Asif Bux	124	0.12	
Independent	Nawab Uddin	49	0.05	
Independent	Maaz Muqaddam	31	0.03	
Pakistan Falah Party	Nasir Ahmed	30	0.03	
Independent	Syed Naveed Aziz	21	0.02	
Independent	Jawwad Iqbal Sherazi	12	0.01	
Independent	Najam Idris Khan	9	0.01	
Independent	Masroor Ahmed Khan	5	0.01	
Majority		4,372	4.20	
Valid ballots		104,239		
Rejected ballots		1,401		
Turnout		105,640		
Registered electors		257,503		
hold				

== General elections 2013 ==
Contesting candidates	Party affiliation	Votes polled

== General elections 2008 ==
Contesting candidates	Party affiliation	Votes polled

== See also ==
- PS-129 Karachi Central-VIII
- PS-1 Jacobabad-I
