= Imran Ali Shah =

Pakistani politician

Syed Imran Ali Shah

Member of the Provincial Assembly of Sindh
- In office 13 August 2018 – 11 August 2023
- Constituency: PS-129 (Karachi Central-VII)

Personal details
- Born: Karachi, Sindh, Pakistan
- Parent: Mohammad Ali Shah (father)

Syed Imran Ali Shah is a Pakistani politician who had been a member of the Provincial Assembly of Sindh from August 2018 to August 2023.

== Political career ==
He was elected to the Provincial Assembly of Sindh as a candidate of the Pakistan Tehreek-e-Insaf (PTI) from PS-129 Karachi Central-VII in the 2018 Sindh provincial election.

On 20 May 2023, he left the PTI due to the 2023 Pakistani protests.

== Physical assault controversy ==
On 14 August 2018, he made national news when he physically assaulted a citizen near National Stadium, Karachi. A video of Shah assaulting a citizen quickly went viral and sparked outrage. Following the incident, PTI issued show cause notice to Shah. The next day, his step-mother claimed that Shah tortures her and she feels unsafe because Shah has become a member of the Sindh Assembly. She also accused Shah of property theft. On 16 August, PTI suspended the party membership of Shah.

On 18 August 2018, Chief Justice of Pakistan Mian Saqib Nisar took notice of Shah's physical assault incident. On 20 August 2018, Shah submitted apology to the Supreme Court for assaulting the citizen and claimed that he assaulted the citizen in self-defence. On 25 August 2018, PTI Karachi's Disciplinary Committee imposed a fine of Rs. 0.5 million on Shah and directed him to pay the fine to the Edhi Homes Orphanage Centres and also provide free medical treatment to 20 orthopaedic patients recommended by Edhi Trust. On 1 September, Chief Justice Mian Saqib Nisar ordered Shah to deposit Rs 3 million in the Supreme Court dams fund as punishment.
