= Moussaieff =

Moussaieff is a Bukharian Jewish surname, a French-language spelling of the patronymic surname Musayev derived from the Arabic name Musa. Notable people with the surname include:

- Dorrit Moussaieff (born 1950), Israeli jewellery designer, First Lady of Iceland
- Jeffrey Moussaieff Masson (born 1941), American author
- Shlomo Moussaieff (businessman) (1925–2015), Israeli-born millionaire in London
- Shlomo Moussaieff (rabbi) (1852–1922), rabbi and gemstone trader from Uzbekistan, and founder of the Bukharim neighborhood of Jerusalem

== See also ==
- Moussaieff Red Diamond, a 5.11-carat fancy red diamond
