= Heer Soho =

Pakistani politician

Member of the Provincial Assembly of Sindh
- In office 13 August 2018 – 11 August 2023
- Constituency: Reserved seat for women
- In office 2002 – 28 May 2018

Personal details
- Born: 26 September 1975 (age 50) Mirpur Bathoro Tehsil, Sindh, Pakistan
- Party: PPP (2018–present)
- Other political affiliations: MQM-L (2002–2018)

Heer Soho is a Pakistani politician who had been a Member of the Provincial Assembly of Sindh, from August 2018 to August 2023 and from 2002 to May 2018. She is the present chief of the Soho tribe.

== Early life and education ==
She was born on 26 September 1975 in Mirpur Bathoro.

She has done Master of Science in Agriculture and Master of Arts in Economics.

== Political career ==
She was elected to the Provincial Assembly of Sindh as a candidate of Muttahida Qaumi Movement (MQM) on a reserved seat for women in the 2002 Pakistani general election.

She ran for the seat of the National Assembly of Pakistan as a candidate of MQM from Constituency NA-238 (Thatta-II) in the 2008 Pakistani general election, but was unsuccessful and lost the seat to Syed Ayaz Ali Shah Sheerazi. In the same election, she also ran for the seat of the Provincial Assembly of Sindh from Constituency PS-85 (Thatta-II) as an independent candidate and from Constituency PS-86 (Thatta-III) as a candidate of MQM, but was unsuccessful and lost both seats to Sassui Palijo and Shah Hussain Shah Sheerazi, respectively. In the same election, she was re-elected to the Provincial Assembly of Sindh as a candidate of MQM on a reserved seat for women.

She ran for the seat of the Provincial Assembly of Sindh as a candidate of MQM from Constituency PS-85 (Thatta-II) in the 2013 Pakistani general election, but was unsuccessful and lost the seat to Amir Haider Shah Sheerazi. In the same election, she was re-elected to the Provincial Assembly of Sindh as a candidate of MQM on a reserved seat for women.

In March 2018, she quit MQM and joined Pakistan Peoples Party (PPP).

She was re-elected to the Provincial Assembly of Sindh as a candidate of PPP on a reserved seat for women in the 2018 Pakistani general election.
