= Najeeb Haroon =

Pakistani politician

Member of the National Assembly of Pakistan
- In office 13 August 2018 – 19 April 2020
- Constituency: NA-256 (Karachi Central-IV)

Personal details
- Born: Karachi, Sindh, Pakistan

Najeeb Haroon (Urdu: نجیب ہارون) is a Pakistani politician who had been a member of the National Assembly of Pakistan from August 2018 till April 2020. He is also the Chairman of Pakistan Engineering Council.

== Early life and education ==
He has done Masters in Civil Engineering from the Oregon State University and is an engineer by profession.

In 1987, he returned to Pakistan from the United States and started his construction business.

== Political career ==
He began his political journey during his days at the NED University of Engineering and Technology when he became the President of the Student Union.

He was one of the members who founded Pakistan Tehreek-e-Insaf (PTI) in mid-1990s.

He ran for the seat of the Provincial Assembly of Sindh as a candidate of PTI from Constituency PS-114 (Karachi-XXVI) in by-polls held in July 2017. He received 5,098 votes and lost the seat to Saeed Ghani.

He was elected to the National Assembly of Pakistan from Constituency NA-256 (Karachi Central-IV) as a candidate of PTI in the 2018 Pakistani general election. He received 89,850 votes and defeated Amir Wali Uddin Chishti, a candidate of Muttahida Qaumi Movement (MQM).

He was noted as Pakistan’s highest tax paid politician.

In April 2020, he announced to resign as a member of the National Assembly citing reasons that a lack of funds provided to him for development projects in his constituency.

== More Reading ==
- List of members of the 15th National Assembly of Pakistan
- List of Pakistan Tehreek-e-Insaf elected members (2013–2018)
- No-confidence motion against Imran Khan
