= Bilqees Mukhtar =

Pakistani politician

Member of the Provincial Assembly of Sindh
- Constituency: Reserved seat for women
- In office 2002 – 28 May 2018
- Incumbent
- Assumed office 24 Feb 2024

Personal details
- Born: 23 May 1969 (age 57) Karachi, Sindh, Pakistan
- Party: MQM-P (2023-present)
- Other party: PSP (2016-2023); MQM-L (2013-2016)

Bilqees Mukhtar is a Pakistani politician who is currently a Member of the Provincial Assembly of Sindh, from 2024, previously she was on this post from 2002 to 2018.

== Early life and education ==
She was born on 23 May 1969 in Karachi.

She earned the degree of Bachelor of Arts from Abdullah Government College for Women.

== Political career ==
She was elected to the Provincial Assembly of Sindh as a candidate of Muttahida Qaumi Movement (MQM) from Constituency PS-101 (Karachi-XIII) in the 2002 Pakistani general election. She received 21,480 votes and defeated a candidate of Muttahida Majlis-e-Amal.

She was re-elected to the Provincial Assembly of Sindh as a candidate of MQM on a reserved seat for women in the 2008 Pakistani general election.

She was re-elected to the Provincial Assembly of Sindh as a candidate of MQM on a reserved seat for women in the 2013 Pakistani general election.
