= Tarlan Musayeva =

Azerbaijani soldier

Tarlan Musayeva Member of the National Assembly of Azerbaijan
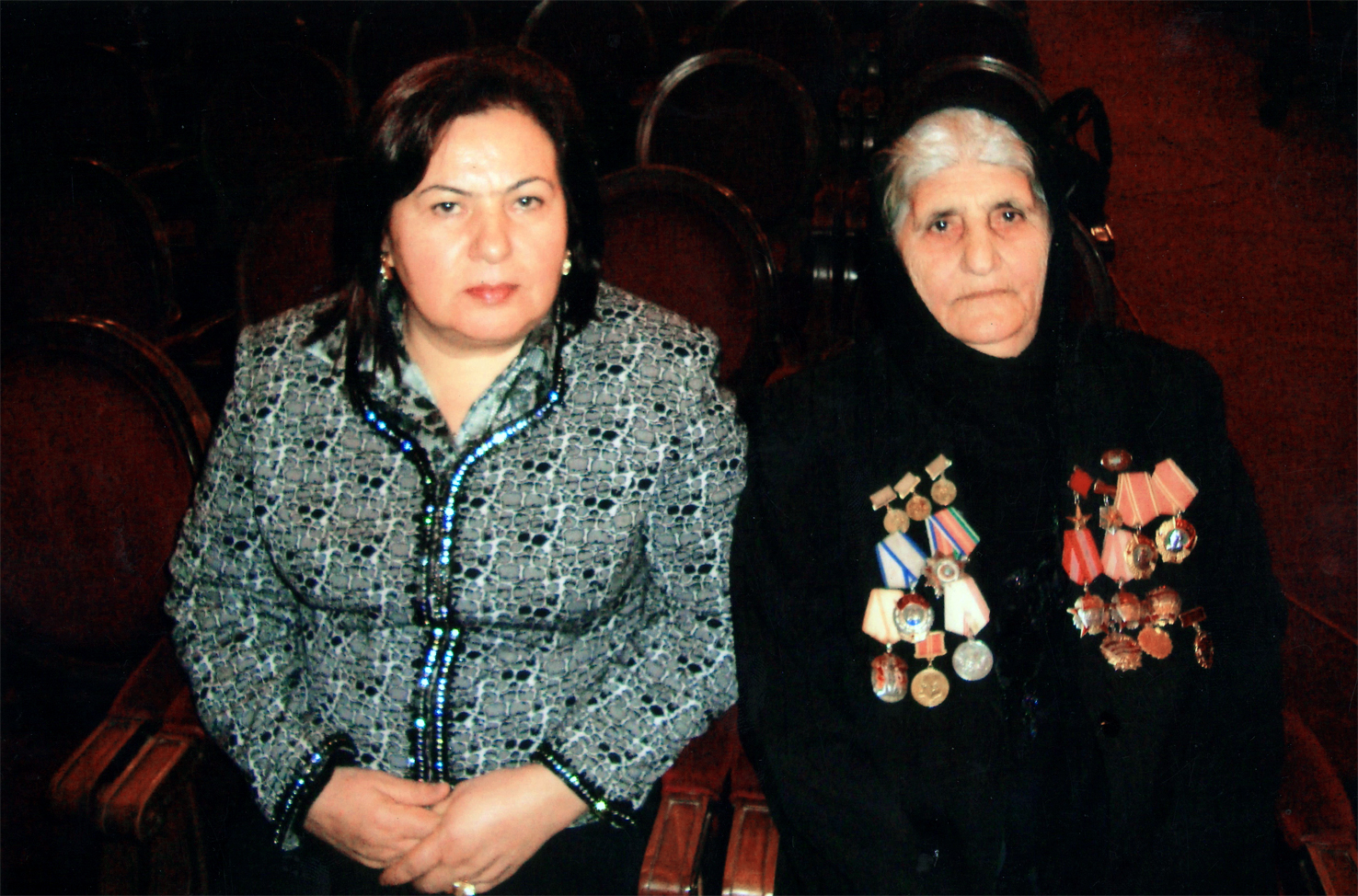

Member of the Azerbaijan Parliament for Barda
- In office 1995–2000
- Preceded by: new constituency

Personal details
- Born: 22 January 1955 (age 71) Kələntərli, Barda District, Azerbaijan SSR, Soviet Union
- Profession: Politician

Tarlan Musayeva (Azerbaijani: Tərlan Musayeva; 22 January 1955) is the former Member of the National Assembly of Azerbaijan (I convocation), and the Member of the State Committee for Family, Women and Children Affairs.

== Early life and education ==
Tarlan Musayeva was born in the Kələntərli village of Barda District, Azerbaijan. In 1972, she graduated from Secondary School No. 1 in Tartar and in the same year, was admitted to the technical vocational school No. 105. In 1973 she graduated from Vocational School of Mechanical Engineering, and began her career as a mechanization expert in the "Communism" kolkhoz of Barda District.

=== Personal life ===
Musayeva is married and has 3 children and 2 grandchildren.

== Political career ==
Tarlan Musayeva was the youngest member of the Supreme Soviet of the Soviet Union (X-XI convocations) at the age of 23.

In 1995 she was elected the member of the National Assembly of the Republic of Azerbaijan from the Barda District Election Constituency No. 56. The proposals made by Musayeva as a member of the Agrarian Reform Commission were highly appreciated by the MPs. She was a great contributor to the discussions of about 30 laws in the National Assembly of Azerbaijan.

Tarlan Musayeva was a deputy chairman of the kolkhoz board in 1981–1991.

In 1991–1992 she served as a chairman of kolkhoz board named after Samad Aga Aghamalioglu and a chairman of the Barda District People's Deputies Council. She continued her distance education while she was working, and graduated from Agdam Agricultural College, Ganja Agricultural Academy and the Academy of Public Administration under the President of the Republic of Azerbaijan.

Since 1993 she is a member of the New Azerbaijan Party. In 2002–2003 she worked at the State Labour İnspectorate Service and is currently a member of the State Committee for Family, Women and Children Affairs.

=== Awards ===
Musayeva received the Order of the Red Banner of Labour, the Order of Friendship of Peoples, and was awarded with the Lenin Komsomol Prize of the Azerbaijan SSR and USSR for her distinguished labor activity. At the same time, she received gold, silver and bronze medals at the Exhibition of Achievements of the People. Also, Musayeva won the awards and some honorary orders by Pasha Angelina, Tursnoy Akhundova and Sevil Gaziyeva.

In 1980, a documentary about Tarlan Musayeva was filmed by Elchin Efendiyev.

== See also ==
- National Assembly (Azerbaijan)
