= Ajaz =

Ajaz is a nasculine given name of Arabic origin. Notable people with the name include:

== Given name ==
- Ajaz Khowaj Quoram Ahmed (born 1973), British entrepreneur
- Ajaz Akhtar (born 1968), Pakistani cricketer
- Ajaz Anwar (born 1946), Pakistani painter
- Ajaz Ahmed Jan, Indian politician
- Ajaz Ahmad Khan (born 1968), Indian politician
- Ajaz Khan (born 1981), Indian actor
- Ajaz Patel (born 1988), New Zealand cricketer
- Ajaz Khan Swati, Pakistani politician
