= Pankaj Zaveri =

Indian cricketer (1945–2020)

Personal information
- Full name: Pankaj Navinchandra Jhaveri
- Born: 14 January 1945; Ahmedabad, India
- Died: 1 May 2020 (aged 75)
- Source: Cricinfo, 25 April 2021

Pankaj Zaveri (14 January 1945 – 1 May 2020) was an Indian cricketer. He played in 58 first-class matches for Gujarat from 1965/66 to 1981/82.

== See also ==
- List of Gujarat cricketers
