= Soho (tribe) =

Sindhi tribe

سوھو

Regions with significant populations
- Pakistan

Languages
- Sindhi

Religion
- Islam

Related ethnic groups
- Sindhi people

Soho (Sindhi: سوھو) is a Sindhi tribe found in Sindh, Pakistan. The present chief of the tribe is Heer Soho. She is a former member of the Provincial Assembly of Sindh.
