= Fakir (disambiguation) =

A fakir or faqir (Arabic: فقیر, lit. 'poor') is a Sufi who performs feats of endurance or apparent magic.

It may also refer to:

== People ==
- Fakir (name), including a list of people with that name
- Faqir (clan), an ethnic community found in North India
- Faqir (given name), including a list of people with that name

== Places ==
- Fakir Mohan University, state university in Balasore, India
- Faqir Mosque, 15th-century mosque in Chittagong, Bangladesh
- Faqir Turko Mangrio railway station, railway station in Sindh, Pakistan
- Faqirwali, town in Punjab, Pakistan

== See also ==
- Fakira, 1976 Indian Hindi-language film by C. P. Dixit
