= Hasubhai Zinzuwadia =

Indian cricketer (born 1942)

Hasubhai Zinzuwadia (born 6 October 1942) is an Indian cricketer. He was a right-handed batsman and right-arm offbreak bowler who played for Gujarat. He was born in Ahmedabad.

Zinzuwadia made a single first-class appearance for the side, during the 1958–59 season, against Maharashtra. From the lower order, he scored four runs in the first innings in which he batted, and a duck in the second.

He married Purnimaben Zinzuwadia of Panchvati Ahmedabad, daughter of Shethjee Chaturbhujdas Chimanlal Zaverchand Laxminchand Parikh of Ahmedabad on 3 March 1967 (source Sandesh Samachar Newspaper ) Sandesh Gujarati language founded in 1923 in Gujarat. Purnima Hasubhai Zinzuwadia was given away in marriage by her Godfather Acharya J B Kripalani J. B. Kripalani File:Acharya Kripalani 1989 stamp of India.jpg, closest confidante of Mahatma Gandhi. Purnimaben Zinzuwadia was a descendant of the famed Zaverchand Gaekwaad Pvt Ltd of Baroda Gujarat . His wife was noble lady who helped everyone with compassion.

Jivatram Bhagwandas Kripalani (11 November 1888 – 19 March 1982), popularly known as Acharya Kripalani, was an Indian politician, noted particularly for holding the presidency of the Indian National Congress during the transfer of power in 1947 and the husband of Sucheta Kriplani. Kripalani was a Gandhian socialist, environmentalist, mystic and independence activist. Indian independence movement

He grew close to Gandhi and at one point, he was one of Gandhi's most ardent disciples. J.B. Kripalani was a familiar figure to generations of dissenters, from the Non-Cooperation Movements of the 1920s to the Emergency of the 1970s Indira Gandhi. The Emergency (India) State of Emergency in India Constitution of India Constituent Assembly of India His esteemed wife was Sucheta Kriplani first Woman Chief Minister of Uttar Pradesh India List of presidents of the Indian National Congress President of India

Hasubhai Zinzuwadia acquired master's degree in Civil Engineering from NYU New York University New York University. He did his schooling from Diwan Ballubhai School in Kankaria Lake Kankaria Lake in Ahmedabad Ahmedabad Maninagar. He also attended Gujarat University Gujarat University. He never played Cricket again. He did his bachelor's degree from University of Missouri at Rola. His fathers was famed Industrialist Shethjee Ranchodd Raijee Zinzuwadia (aka Babubhai Zinzuwadia who built Gujarat Assembly Gujarat Legislative Assembly in Gandhinagar Gandhi Nagar India. His father-in-law Shethjee Chaturbhujdas Chimanlal Zaverchand Laxminchand Parikh of Panchwati Ahmedabad (originally from Vadodara Gujarat) was famed Business Magnate and India's Top Industrialist with domination in both the textile and diamond industries in the 1950s and 1960s at the turn of India's freedom movement. His ancestors owned India's first textile mill called Yamuna Mills in Maharashtra Mumbai originally Bombay British India. He was confidante along with Acharya Kripalani and close friends with other freedom fighters in Quit India movement Quit India Movement with Jawaharlal Nehru and Sardar Vallabhbhai Patel and Mahatama Gandhi whose freedom movement he funded along with other famed names of Ahmedabad with likes Sarabhai family, Mashruwala Family, and other major business families such as Birla family Birla Family, Kotak Family, Tata who all attended Hasubhais Wedding to Purnimaben Parikh and the media of the time termed it as "wedding of the Century" The happy couple went on a year-long honeymoon to Switzerland and Candy in Ceylon. Their wedding reception was attended by Prime Minister of India, President of India and major Indian politicians, actors, media moguls and industry leaders, especially Lalchand Hirachand owners of Steam Ship Company. Purnimabens father and father-in-law were in unique position of being close confidant of Royal families of Gujarat namely Gaekwaads of Baroda. Her father was ardent follower of Gandhian philosophy of life and wore cotton khadi that he used to custom weave for himself at his textile mill named Bharat Sarvodaya Mills located in the heart of Ahmedabad. Hasubhai witnessed and participated in phenomenal things in his youth such as creation of Cricket Leagues of India along with his friends family the Royal Family of Jamnagar in Gujarat and creation of International Society for Krishna Consciousness ISKONS first Trip to United States of America on Scindia Steamship Company. Scindia Steam Navigation Company Ltd.
