= Nayla =

Nayla may refer to:

- Na'ila bint al-Furafisa, wife of third Rashidun caliph Uthman
- Nayla Al Khaja (born 1978), Emirati film writer and director
- Nayla Chidiac (born 1966), French-Lebanese author, essayist, and poet
- Nayla D. Purnama (born 2007), Indonesian actress
- Nayla Hayek (born 1951), Swiss businesswoman
- Nayla Moawad (born 1940), Lebanese politician
- Nayla Tamraz, Lebanese writer and academic
- Nayla Tueni (born 1982), Lebanese journalist and politician
- Nayla (Dune), fictional character from Frank Herbert's novel God Emperor of Dune
- Buku Harian Nayla, Indonesian christian drama television series

== See also ==
- Neyla (disambiguation)
- Naila (name)
