= Muhammad Dilawar Qureshi =

Pakistani politician

Member of the Provincial Assembly of Sindh
- In office 29 May 2013 – 28 May 2018

Personal details
- Born: 16 June 1979 (age 46) Hyderabad, Sindh, Pakistan
- Other political affiliations: MQM-P (2023-present)

Muhammad Dilawar Qureshi is a Pakistani politician who had been a Member of the Provincial Assembly of Sindh, from May 2013 to May 2018.

== Early life and education ==
He was born on 16 June 1979 in Hyderabad, Pakistan.

He has a degree of Master of Arts in English, a degree of Master of Arts in Political Science, and a degree of Bachelor of Laws.

He also has a degree of Master of Laws and Doctor of Philosophy in Law.

== Political career ==
He was elected to the Provincial Assembly of Sindh as a candidate of Mutahida Quami Movement from Constituency PS-45 HYDERABAD-I in the 2013 Pakistani general election.
