= Khairunisa Mughal =

Pakistani politician

Member of the Provincial Assembly of Sindh
- In office June 2013 – 28 May 2018
- Constituency: Reserved seat for women

Personal details
- Born: 14 June 1968 (age 58) Mirpur Khas, Sindh, Pakistan
- Party: PPP (2013-present)

Khairunisa Mughal is a Pakistani politician who had been a Member of the Provincial Assembly of Sindh, from June 2013 to May 2018.

== Early life and education ==
She was born on 14 June 1968 in Mirpur Khas.

She earned the degree of Bachelor of Arts and the degree of Master of Public Administration, both from the University of Sindh.

== Political career ==
She was elected to the Provincial Assembly of Sindh as a candidate of Pakistan Peoples Party on a reserved seat for women in the 2013 Pakistani general election.
