= Dhiren Gajjar =

Indian cricketer

Dhiren Gajjar (born 25 May 1959) was an Indian cricketer. He was a right-handed batsman and left-arm slow bowler who played for Gujarat. He was born in Kalol.

Gajjar, who made his cricketing debut for Gujarat Schools during the 1975–76 season, and who played for Gujarat Under-22s between 1978–79 and 1980–81, made a single first-class appearance for the side, during the 1981–82 season, against Maharashtra. From the lower-middle order, he scored 14 runs in the only innings in which he batted.

He bowled 14 overs in the match, conceding 41 runs.
