= Hafiz Naeem ur Rehman =

Pakistani politician

- حافظ نعیم الرحمن
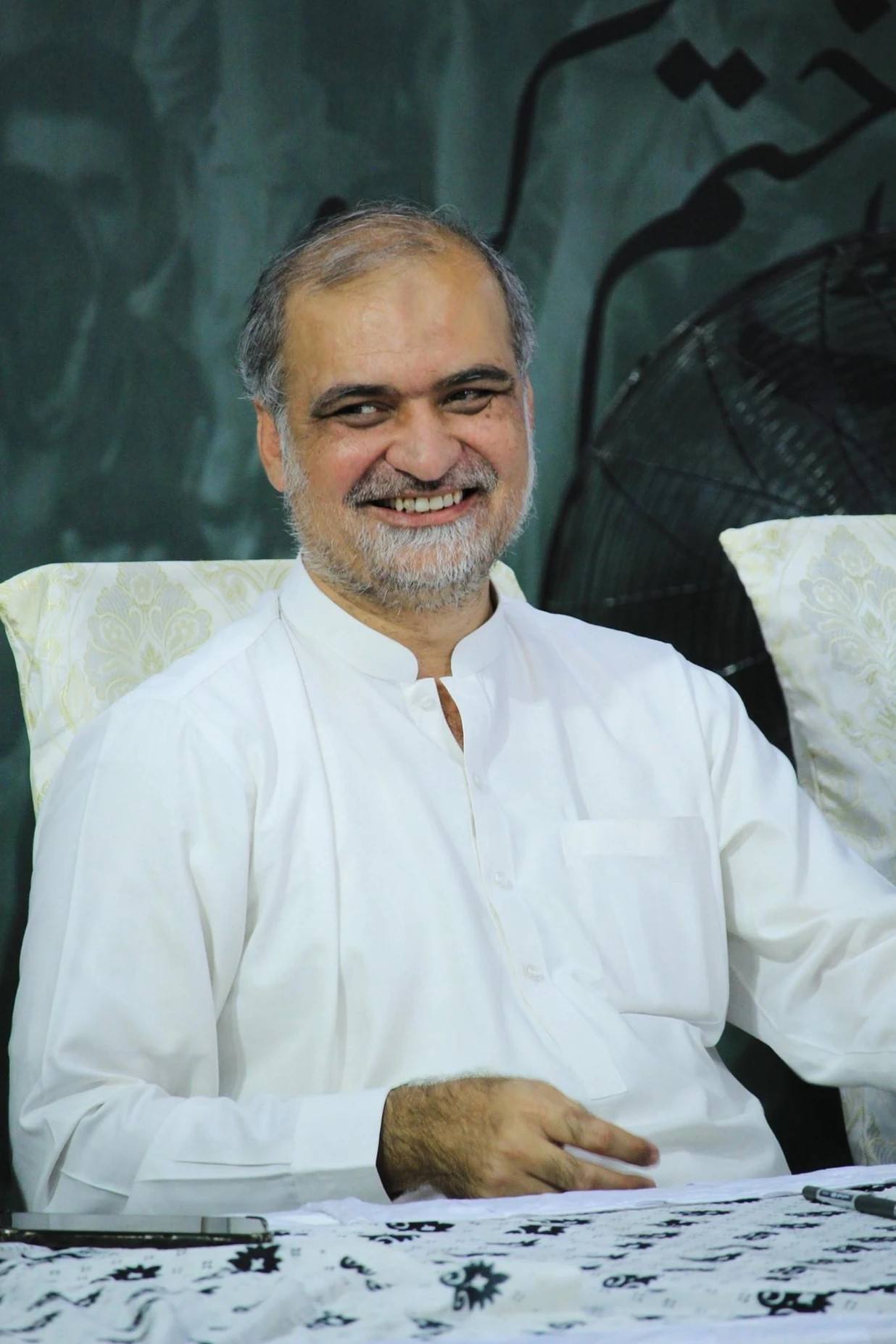
- Rehman in 2023

6th Emir of Jamaat-e-Islami Pakistan
- Incumbent
- Assumed office 4 April 2024
- Preceded by: Siraj-ul-Haq

Emir of Jamaat-e-Islami Karachi
- In office 2013–2024
- Preceded by: Muhammad Hussain Mehanti
- Succeeded by: Munam Zafar Khan

Personal details
- Born: 1 December 1972 (age 53) Hyderabad, Sindh, Pakistan
- Citizenship: Pakistan
- Party: Jamaat-e-Islami Pakistan (2013–present)
- Children: 4
- Education: NED University of Engineering and Technology Karachi University
- Occupation: Engineer; Politician; Activist; Hafiz-e-Quran
- Website: www.hafiznaeem.com

Hafiz Naeem ur Rehman (Urdu: حافظ نعیم الرحمن; born 1 December 1972) is a Pakistani social activist, engineer, politician and Ameer of Jamaat-e-Islami Pakistan (JIP) for the session 2024–2029. Previously he served as the President of Karachi Chapter from 2013 to 2024.

== Early life, education and family ==
Naeem was born on 1 December 1972 in Hyderabad to middle-class Urdu-speaking Muhajir parents who had migrated from Aligarh, India during the 1947 Partition of India.

In his youth, Naeem memorized the Qur'an at the Jamia Masjid Darul Uloom in Latifabad, a town located in Hyderabad, Sindh. Later, he got his Bachelor's degree in Civil Engineering from NED followed by a Master's degree in Islamic History from Karachi University.

His wife is a doctor while his children, three sons and a daughter, are all involved in politics.

== Professional career ==
Naeem is an engineer with 20 years of expertise as a water treatment engineer in industrial and large-scale residential projects.

== Political career ==
=== 1990s ===
Naeem joined Islami Jamiat-e-Talaba (IJT) in the early 90s and eventually served as its Central President (Nazim-e-Aala) twice.

Hafiz Naeem joined the IJT at the age of 16. By the age of 20 "he had been booked and arrested in numerous cases due to his activism", and due to his perceived leadership qualities and sacrifices he'd eventually represent IJT at the national level, becoming its Nazim-e-Aala in 1998.

=== 2000s ===
In 2000, he became a member of JI. He also served as General Secretary and Deputy Ameer of Jamaat-e-Islami Karachi.

=== 2010s ===
He became the Ameer of Jamaat-e-Islami's Karachi chapter in 2013.

He ran for the seat in Sindh Provincial Assembly as a candidate of JI from Constituency PS-103 (Karachi-XV) in the 2013 Pakistani general election but was unsuccessful. He received 16,441 votes and lost the seat to MQM's Sajid Qureshi.

=== 2020s ===
==== 2020 protest against K-Electric ====
Naeem has led many protests against Karachi's electric utility company K-Electric, due to government's alleged favoritism to the utility company, and its dis-service to the people of Karachi in terms of not returning its consumers their money under a claw-back clause applicable to the company. Naeem claimed the company's Rs 9 billion profits in 2020, were at a cost of large subsidies received from the government, which costed tax payers money to benefit the owners of the utility company. Naeem also demanded a forensic audit of K-Electric, claiming that the utility company has been in close relations with all ruling political parties, and alleged that the company enjoyed benefits from the ruling parties.

==== 2022 Karachi rights campaign ====
Naeem has led multiple protests in Karachi to fight for the rights of his city and pledged to address water supply and drainage issues of Karachi if his party is voted into power in 2022 local body elections.

==== Protest against Election Commission of Pakistan ====
During the 2022 local body elections, the Election Commission of Pakistan (ECP) delayed the agreed upon date of elections from 24 July 2022 to 28 August 2022 citing bad weather as the reason. ECP claimed that it delayed elections on the request of JI's local leadership, i.e. Naeem. Naeem challenged the ECP against this allegation and sent a legal notice to ECP, and threatened a sit-in against the ECP against this allegation.

==== 2023 Karachi Local Government elections ====
Naeem led JIP emerged as the second largest political party behind Pakistan People's Party in 2023 Karachi local elections. JIP secured more than 30% of popular votes as well as 85 Union Council seats and emerged as the second largest party according to the final results.

==== 2023 Karachi mayoral election ====
In the 2023 election, Murtaza Wahab and Naeem competed to become the mayor of Karachi. Murtaza Wahab, from the Pakistan People's Party (PPP), won the election with 173 votes, while Naeem from Jamaat-e-Islami Pakistan received 160 votes. After the results were announced, there were clashes between PPP and JIP supporters outside the Arts Council of Pakistan. JIP accused the Sindh government of kidnapping 29 members of the Pakistan Tehreek-e-Insaf (PTI) party who were supposed to vote for Naeem as PTI had announced to support JIP officially.

==== 2024 Sindh provincial elections ====
Following the 2024 Sindh provincial election, Naeem relinquished his seat as a protest over alleged mass rigging in Karachi. He claimed that Jamaat-e-Islami Pakistan candidates had won on majority seats as per Form 45 however Pakistan Peoples Party and Mutahidda Qaumi Movement candidates originally on 3rd or 4th position were declared winner as per Form 47 through alleged rigging.

In April 2024, weeks after the provincial election, the ECP notified the victory of Naeem from PS-129 (Karachi Central-VIII). He secured the highest votes i.e. 26,296.

==== Emir of Jamaat-e-Islami Pakistan ====
In April 2024, Naeem was elected as the sixth Ameer of the Jamaat-i-Islami Pakistan (JIP) for a five-year term (2024-2029).

== Writings ==
Naeem writes regularly as a commentator through opinion columns and essays, in Urdu for Daily Jang and in English for The News International.
