= Kamran Akhter =

Pakistani politician

Member of the Provincial Assembly of Sindh
- In office 29 May 2013 – 28 May 2018

Personal details
- Born: 10 April 1977 (age 49) Karachi, Sindh, Pakistan

Kamran Akhter is a Pakistani politician who had been a Member of the Provincial Assembly of Sindh, from May 2013 to May 2018.

== Early life and education ==
He was born on 10 April 1977 in Karachi.

He has a degree of Bachelors of Arts from Karachi University.

== Political career ==
He was elected to the Provincial Assembly of Sindh as a candidate of Mutahida Quami Movement from Constituency PS-91 KARACHI-III in the 2013 Pakistani general election.
