= Ajaz Anwar =

Pakistani painter

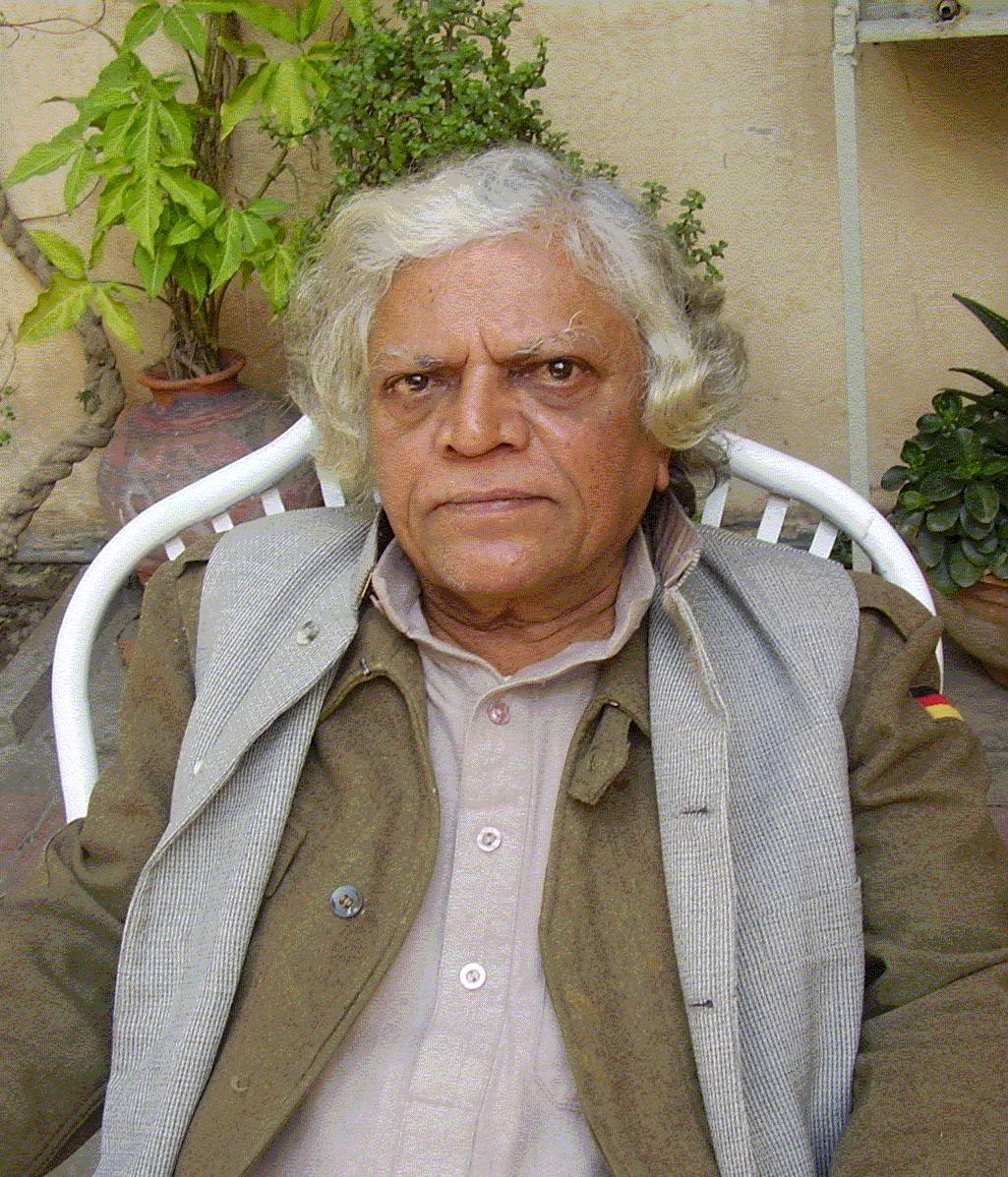
- Ajaz Anwar
- Born: 1946 (age 79–80); Ludhiana, Punjab Province, British India
- Known for: Painting
- Website: ajazart.com

Ajaz Anwar (Urdu: اعجاز انور; born 1946) is a Pakistani painter. He went on to teach at National College of Arts Lahore. His watercolour paintings show the grandeur of the old buildings and the cultural life in Lahore.

== Life ==
Born in Ludhiana in 1946, his father was a cartoonist who apparently had stirred his passion from childhood and from whom he drew his inspiration. After obtaining his M.A. in Fine Arts and a Gold medal in 1967 from Punjab University (PUCAD) Lahore, he completed his Ph.D. in Muslim architecture, in Turkey in 1978 and proceeded to do a course on conservation of cultural property at UNESCO, Rome, in 1977. From 1972 he has been lecturing until he became professor and director of Art Gallery NCA, Lahore to date.

Anwar was the recipient of the President's "Pride of Performance in Painting" in 1997.

== Exhibitions ==
Anwar has had exhibitions in Lahore, Ankara, Rawalpindi, Istanbul, Rome, Kampala, Chandigarh, Delhi, and London.
