= Mehmood Abdul Razzaque =

Pakistani politician

Member of the Provincial Assembly of Sindh
- In office 29 May 2013 – 28 May 2018

Personal details
- Born: 9 March 1976 (age 50) Karachi, Sindh, Pakistan
- Party: MQM-P (2023-present)
- Other political affiliations: PSP (2017-2023); MQM-L (2013-2017)

Mehmood Abdul Razzaque is a Pakistani politician who had been a Member of the Provincial Assembly of Sindh, from May 2013 to May 2018.

== Early life and education ==
He was born on 9 March 1976 in Karachi.

He has a degree of Bachelors of Commerce from Karachi University.

== Political career ==
He was elected to the Provincial Assembly of Sindh as a candidate of Mutahida Quami Movement from Constituency PS-116 KARACHI-XXVIII in the 2013 Pakistani general election.

In April 2017, he announced to quit MQM and joined the Pak Sarzameen Party.
