= Rafique Saigol =

Pakistani businessman

Mian Muhammad Rafique Saigol (1 September 1933 – 10 December 2003) was a Pakistani businessman and politician who served as a member of the National Assembly of Pakistan in 1965. He also served as a chairman of the Pakistan International Airlines.

== Biography ==
Rafique Saigol was born on 1 September 1933 in Kolkata, British India to Mian Yousuf Saigol, who founded Saigol Group. He received his early education at The Doon School and Aitchison College. Later, he attended Clemson University, where he studied economics and textile management, graduating in 1953.

After completing his education, Saigol became the managing director of Kohinoor Textile Mills in Lyallpur (now Faisalabad). Later, he also served as the chairman of the All-Pakistan Textile Mills Association and as the president of the Lahore Chamber of Commerce.

In 1965, Saigol entered politics and was elected to the National Assembly of Pakistan, representing Lyallpur. During his time in the National Assembly, he served as the parliamentary secretary to the Ministry of Communications. He also acted as an adviser to Zulfikar Ali Bhutto. During the nationalization period in Pakistan, Saigol was appointed as a chairman of Pakistan International Airlines in 1972.

Saigol was also one of the founders of the Lahore Stock Exchange and United Bank Limited. One of his younger brother was Azam Saigol. His sister Naz Saigol is married with Mian Mansha.
