= Rehan Zafar =

Pakistani politician

Member of the Provincial Assembly of Sindh
- In office 29 May 2013 – 28 May 2018

Personal details
- Born: 13 March 1973 (age 53) Karachi, Sindh, Pakistan

Rehan Zafar is a Pakistani politician who had been a Member of the Provincial Assembly of Sindh, from May 2013 to May 2018.

== Early life ==
He was born on 13 March 1973 in Karachi.

== Political career ==
He was elected to the Provincial Assembly of Sindh as a candidate of Mutahida Quami Movement from Constituency PS-104 KARACHI-XVI in the 2013 Pakistani general election.
