= Saniya Naz =

Pakistani politician

Member of the Provincial Assembly of Sindh
- In office June 2013 – 28 May 2018

Personal details
- Born: 19 April 1988 (age 37) Karachi
- Party: Pakistan Peoples Party

Saniya Naz (Urdu: ثانیہ ناز; born 19 April 1988) is a Pakistani politician who had been a Member of the Provincial Assembly of Sindh, from June 2013 to May 2018.

== Early life and education ==
Naz was born on 19 April 1988 in Karachi.

Naz received her early education from Mir Ayub Khan Secondary School and her intermediate level education from Karachi College.

== Political career ==
Naz was elected to the Provincial Assembly of Sindh as a candidate of Pakistan Peoples Party from Constituency PS-109 Karachi-XXI in the 2013 Pakistani general election.
