= Irtiza Khalil Farooqui =

Pakistani politician

Member of the Provincial Assembly of Sindh
- In office 29 May 2013 – 28 May 2018

Personal details
- Born: 22 February 1973 (age 53) Karachi, Sindh, Pakistan
- Party: MQM-P (2023-present)
- Other political affiliations: PSP (2017-2023); MQM-L (2013-2017)

Irtiza Khalil Farooqui is a Pakistani politician who had been a Member of the Provincial Assembly of Sindh, from May 2013 to May 2018.

== Early life and education ==
He was born on 22 February 1973 in Karachi.

He has a degree of Bachelors of Arts.

== Political career ==
He was elected to the Provincial Assembly of Sindh as a candidate of Mutahida Quami Movement from Constituency PS-119 KARACHI-XXXI in the 2013 Pakistani general election. In April 2017, he quit MQM and joined Pak Sarzameen Party.
