= Zaffar Ahmed Khan Kamali =

Pakistani politician

Member of the Provincial Assembly of Sindh
- In office August 2013 – 28 May 2018

Personal details
- Born: 16 October 1962 (age 63) Mirpur Khas, Sindh, Pakistan

Zaffar Ahmed Khan Kamali (born 16 October 1962) is a Pakistani politician who had been a Member of the Provincial Assembly of Sindh from August 2013 to May 2018.

== Early life and education ==
He was born on 16 October 1962 in Mirpur Khas.

He has a degree of Bachelor of Medicine, Bachelor of Surgery from Jinnah Sindh Medical University.

== Political career ==
He was elected to the Provincial Assembly of Sindh as a candidate of Mutahida Quami Movement from Constituency PS-64 MIRPUR KHAS-I in by-polls held in August 2013.
