= Fakir Muhammad Lashari =

- فقير محمد لاشاري
- Born: 4 September 1951; Gaji Khuhawar, Larkana Sindh, Pakistan
- Died: 17 July 1993 (aged 41); Islamabad, Pakistan
- Education: University of Sindh (M.A.)
- Occupation: Journalist
- Writing career
- Subjects: Journalism and Literature
- Notable awards: Presidential Civil Award, Govt. of Pakistan
- Movement: Progressive

Fakir Muhammad Lashari (Sindhi:فقير محمد لاشاري, Urdu:فقير محمد لاشاری) (b. 4 September 1951, d. 17 July 1993) was a Pakistani journalist, poet and intellectual from Sindh, Pakistan.

== Education ==
Lashari received an early education from his native village Gaji Khuhawar. He obtained a B.A degree from College Larkana and M.A. in Economics from the University of Sindh Jamshoro in 1974.

== Contribution ==
Lashari was a journalist, writer, critic, humanist and editorialist. He introduced new trends in journalism and politics during the MRD movement in Pakistan in 1983. He was aware of rights of Sindh province and journalists. Thus he fought for rights boldly. The intellectuals and civil society pays tribute to Fakir Muhammad Lashari regarding his multidimensional contributions. He remained active in the field of politics, Sindhi literature and journalism. He was rewarded with civil award by the government of Pakistan in the field of literature (Journalism) in 1995.

== Death ==
Lashari died on 17 July 1993 near Islamabad, as the result of a road accident.
