= Sheikh Ejaz Ahmad =

Pakistani politician and businessman

Senator Sheikh Ejaz Ahmad

Member of the Senate of Pakistan
- In office 1985–1988

Personal details
- Born: 1940
- Died: 1998 (aged 57–58)
- Children: Gohar Ejaz
- Occupation: Politician; Businessman

Sheikh Ejaz Ahmad (1940–1998) was a Pakistani politician and businessman who was the founder of Ejaz Group.

== Early life and education ==
Born to a Chinioti business family in 1940, Ejaz relocated to Karachi in 1947 at the age of seven. Later, he attended the Institute of Business Administration (IBA) and graduated with an MBA in 1962.

== Career ==
Ejaz founded Ejaz Group in 1950 which was initially focused on trading commodities such as edible oils, metals, petroleum, and industrial raw materials. In 1980, he expanded the group's operations into manufacturing with the establishment of Mian Nazir Sons Industries.

From 1985 to 1988, Ejaz served as a member of the Senate of Pakistan.

In the 1990s, Ejaz expanded his group's business operations in the textile industry. Ejaz Textile Mills Limited was established in Bhai Pheru in 1990, followed by Ejaz Spinning Mills Limited in Sheikhupura in 1992. The latter was equipped with modern machinery and had its own power generation facilities.

In 1995, Ejaz led the group's entry into the energy sector with the establishment of Ejaz Power Limited, which comprised three power plants with a combined capacity of 30 MW.
