= Iram Khalid =

Pakistani politician

Member of the Provincial Assembly of Sindh
- In office June 2013 – 28 May 2018
- Constituency: Reserved seat for women

Personal details
- Party: Pakistan Peoples Party

Iram Khalid is a Pakistani politician who had been a Member of the Provincial Assembly of Sindh, from June 2013 to May 2018.

== Education ==
She earned the degree of Bachelor of Arts from Saint Joseph's College for Women, Karachi.

== Political career ==
She was elected to the Provincial Assembly of Sindh as a candidate of Pakistan Peoples Party on a reserved seat for women in the 2013 Pakistani general election.

In July 2016, she was inducted into the provincial Sindh cabinet of Chief Minister Syed Murad Ali Shah and was appointed as special assistant on women development.
