= Nadeem Razi =

Pakistani politician

Member of the Provincial Assembly of Sindh
- In office 29 May 2013 – 28 May 2018

Personal details
- Born: 3 June 1966 (age 59) Karachi, Sindh, Pakistan
- Party: MQM-P (2023-present)
- Other political affiliations: PSP (2017-2023); MQM-L (2013-2017)

Nadeem Razi is a Pakistani politician who was a Member of the Provincial Assembly of Sindh from May 2013 to May 2018.

== Early life and education ==
He was born on 3 June 1966 in Karachi.

He has a degree of Bachelor of Commerce from Karachi University.

== Political career ==
He was elected to the Provincial Assembly of Sindh as a candidate of MQM-L from Constituency PS-121 KARACHI-XXXIII in the 2013 Pakistani general election. In September 2017, he quit MQM-P and joined PSP.
