= Ejaz, Idlib =

Ejaz, Idlib اعجاز
- Village
- Location in Syria
- Coordinates: 35°45′41″N 37°2′25″E
- Country: Syria
- Governorate: Idlib
- District: Maarrat al-Nu'man District
- Subdistrict: Sinjar Nahiyah

Population (2004)
  - Total: 1,341
- Time zone: UTC+2 (EET)
  - Summer (DST): UTC+3 (EEST)
- City Qrya Pcode: C4007

Ejaz, Idlib (Arabic: اعجاز) is a Syrian village located in Sinjar Nahiyah in Maarrat al-Nu'man District, Idlib. According to the Syria Central Bureau of Statistics (CBS), Ejaz, Idlib had a population of 1341 in the 2004 census.
