= Rukhsana Shah =

Pakistani politician

Member of the Provincial Assembly of Sindh
- In office 2008 – 28 May 2018
- Constituency: Reserved seat for women

Personal details
- Born: 1 June 1959 (age 67) Thatta, Sindh, Pakistan
- Party: Pakistan Peoples Party

Rukhsana Shah is a Pakistani politician who had been a Member of the Provincial Assembly of Sindh, from 2008 to May 2018.

== Early life and education ==
Rukhsana Shah was born on 1 June 1959 in Thatta.

She has earned the degree of Bachelor of Education, Master of Arts in Economics, and Master of Arts in Islamic Culture, all from the University of Sindh.

== Political career ==
She was elected to the Provincial Assembly of Sindh as a candidate of Pakistan Peoples Party (PPP) on a reserved seat for women in the 2008 Pakistani general election.

She was re-elected to the Provincial Assembly of Sindh as a candidate of PPP on a reserved seat for women in the 2013 Pakistani general election.
