= Kələntərli =

- Municipality
- Location within Azerbaijan Location within Karabakh Economic Region
- Coordinates: 40°20′26″N 47°05′33″E
- Country: Azerbaijan
- Rayon: Lankaran

Population
  - Total: 89,300
- Time zone: UTC+4 (AZT)
  - Summer (DST): UTC+5 (AZT)

Kələntərli (also, Kalantarli, Kalantarly, and Kalentarly) is a village and municipality in the Lankaran of Azerbaijan.

== Population ==
It has a population of 89,300.
