= Sorath Thebo =

Pakistani politician

Member of the Provincial Assembly of Sindh
- In office June 2013 – 28 May 2018
- Constituency: Reserved seat for women

Personal details
- Born: 15 December 1958 (age 67) Dadu
- Party: Pakistan Muslim League (N)

Sorath Thebo is a Pakistani politician who had been a Member of the Provincial Assembly of Sindh, from June 2013 to May 2018.

== Early life ==
She was born on 15 December 1958 in Dadu.

== Political career ==
She was elected to the Provincial Assembly of Sindh as a candidate of Pakistan Muslim League (N) on a reserved seat for women in the 2013 Pakistani general election.
