= Syed Anwar Raza =

Pakistani politician

Member of the Provincial Assembly of Sindh
- In office 29 May 2013 – 28 May 2018

Personal details
- Born: 10 November 1961 (age 64) Karachi, Sindh, Pakistan
- Party: MQM-P (2023-present)
- Other political affiliations: PSP (2018-2023); MQM-L (2013-2018)

Syed Anwar Raza is a Pakistani politician who had been a Member of the Provincial Assembly of Sindh, from May 2013 to May 2018.

== Early life and education ==
He was born on 10 November 1961 in Karachi.

He has a degree of Bachelor of Arts and a degree of Master of Arts.

== Political career ==
He was elected to the Provincial Assembly of Sindh as a candidate of Mutahida Quami Movement (MQM) from Constituency PS-102 KARACHI-XIV in the 2013 Pakistani general election.

In April 2018, he quit MQM and joined Pak Sarzameen Party.
