= Aijaz Haroon =

Pakistani businessman

- Occupations: Pilot, business executive
- Title: Managing Director of Pakistan International Airlines
- Term: May 2008 to February 2011
- Predecessor: Azam Saigol
- Spouse: Uzma Aijaz Haroon

Aijaz Haroon is a Pakistani businessman and airline captain. He was the Managing Director of Pakistan International Airlines, until his resignation in February 2011 over strikes by employees against the airline's management structure and decision-making board.

== Career ==
He started his career as a pilot, and became PIA managing director in May 2008. During a national airline staff strike in February 2011, the Pakistan Airline Pilots’ Association (PALPA) demanded Haroon be removed, and he stepped down with the strike ending immediately afterwards. The strike was in response to a proposed sale where PIA would potentially relinquish lucrative routes to Europe and the United States.

In May 2022 the Islamabad High Court granted him permission to travel abroad for a family matter in London, as Haroon was a suspect after a National Accountability Bureau corruption reference in early 2021 involving the Kidney Hill case, or an alleged illegal allotment of plots, with Haroon as secretary of the Overseas Coopeative Housing Society Limited (OCHSL) group overseeing the matter. Saleem Mandviwala was named as his partner in the matter, along with other businesspeople and politicians. The inquiry had been closed by a Sindh High Court in April 2022.

== Personal life ==
He is married to Uzma Aijaz Haroon.
