= Shafi Muhammad Jamot =

Pakistani politician

Member of the Provincial Assembly of Sindh
- In office 29 May 2013 – 28 May 2018

Personal details
- Born: 10 May 1940 Karachi
- Died: 7 July 2019 (aged 79)
- Party: Pakistan Muslim League (N)
- Relations: Abdul Qadir Patel (father-in-law)

Shafi Muhammad Jamot (10 May 1940 – 7 July 2019) was a Pakistani politician who was a Member of the Provincial Assembly of Sindh from May 2013 to May 2018.

== Personal life ==
He was born on 10 May 1940 in Karachi, and died on 7 July 2019 also in Karachi.

== Political career ==
He was elected to the Provincial Assembly of Sindh as a candidate of Pakistan Muslim League (N) from Constituency PS-129 KARACHI-XLI in the 2013 Pakistani general election.
