= Saeed Khan Nizamani =

Pakistani politician

Member of the Provincial Assembly of Sindh
- In office 29 May 2013 – 28 May 2018

Personal details
- Born: 6 January 1962 (age 64) Sanghar
- Party: Pakistan Muslim League (F)

Saeed Khan Nizamani is a Pakistani politician who had been a Member of the Provincial Assembly of Sindh, from May 2013 to May 2018.

== Early life and education ==
He was born on 6 January 1962 in Sanghar.

He has a degree of Bachelor of Science, a degree of Bachelor of Laws and a degree of Master of Arts.

== Political career ==
He was elected to the Provincial Assembly of Sindh as a candidate of Pakistan Muslim League (F) from Constituency PS-78 SANGHAR-I in the 2013 Pakistani general election.
