= Farhat Mohammad Khan =

Pakistani politician

Member of the National Assembly of Pakistan
- In office 2008 – July 2012

Personal details
- Born: Karachi, Sindh, Pakistan

Farhat Mohammad Khan is a Pakistani politician who has been a member of the National Assembly of Pakistan from 2008 to July 2012.

== Political career ==
He was elected to the National Assembly of Pakistan as a candidate of Muttahida Qaumi Movement from NA-245 (Karachi-VII) in the 2008 Pakistani general election. In July 2012, the Supreme Court of Pakistan suspended his National Assembly membership for having US citizenship.
