= Syed Zai Abbas Shah =

Pakistani politician

Member of the Provincial Assembly of Sindh
- In office 29 May 2013 – 28 May 2018

Personal details
- Born: 12 August 1975 (age 50) Tando Allahyar
- Party: Pakistan Peoples Party

Syed Zai Abbas Shah is a Pakistani politician who had been a Member of the Provincial Assembly of Sindh, from May 2013 to May 2018.

== Early life and education ==
He was born on 12 August 1975 in Tando Allahyar.

He has a degree of Master of Arts from Sindh University.

== Political career ==
He was elected to the Provincial Assembly of Sindh as a candidate of Pakistan Peoples Party from Constituency PS-51 TANDO ALLAYAR-I in the 2013 Pakistani general election.
