= Sheeraz Waheed =

Pakistani politician

Member of the Provincial Assembly of Sindh
- In office 29 May 2013 – 28 May 2018

Personal details
- Born: 10 April 1974 (age 52) Karachi, Sindh, Pakistan
- Other political affiliations: Pakistan Peoples Party

Sheeraz Waheed (born 10 April 1974) is a Pakistani politician who was a Member of the Provincial Assembly of Sindh from May 2013 to May 2018.

== Early life and education ==
He was born on 10 April 1974 in Karachi.

He has a degree of Bachelor of Arts from Islamia Science College.

== Political career ==
He was elected to the Provincial Assembly of Sindh as a candidate of Mutahida Quami Movement from Constituency PS-123 KARACHI-XXXV in the 2013 Pakistani general election.
