= Aisha Khatoon =

Pakistani politician

Member of the Provincial Assembly of Sindh
- In office June 2013 – 28 May 2018
- Constituency: Reserved seat for women

Personal details
- Born: 1 January 1950 (age 76) Banaras, India

Aisha Khatoon is a Pakistani politician who had been a Member of the Provincial Assembly of Sindh, from June 2013 to May 2018.

== Early life and education ==
She was born on 1 January 1950 in Banaras, India.

She earned the degree of the Bachelor of Arts from the University of Karachi.

== Political career ==
She was elected to the Provincial Assembly of Sindh as a candidate of Muttahida Qaumi Movement on a reserved seat for women in the 2013 Pakistani general election.
