= Faseeh Ahmed Shah =

Pakistani politician

Member of the Provincial Assembly of Sindh
- In office 29 May 2013 – 28 May 2018

Personal details
- Born: 4 July 1974 (age 51) Nawab Shah
- Party: Pakistan Peoples Party

Faseeh Ahmed Shah is a Pakistani politician who had been a Member of the Provincial Assembly of Sindh, from May 2013 to May 2018.

== Early life and education ==
He was born on 4 July 1974 in Nawab Shah.

He has a Master of Arts degree in Political Science and a degree of Bachelors of Arts, both from Sindh University.

== Political career ==
He was elected to the Provincial Assembly of Sindh as a candidate of Pakistan Peoples Party from Constituency PS-26 SHAHEED BANAZIR ABAD-III in the 2013 Pakistani general election.
