= Sajid Qureshi =

Pakistani politician (1960–2013)

Muhammad Sajid Qureshi

Member of Provincial Assembly of Sindh
- In office May 2013 – 21 June 2013
- Constituency: PS-103 (Karachi-XV)

Personal details
- Born: 28 December 1960 Karachi, Pakistan
- Died: 13 June 2013 (aged 52) Karachi, Pakistan
- Manner of death: Assassination by gunshots
- Party: Muttahida Qaumi Movement

Muhammad Sajid Qureshi (born 28 December 1960–21 June 2013) was a Pakistani politician. He was Sindh Assembly's MPA from Karachi. He was assassinated in 2013.

== Political career ==
He was elected as the member of Provincial Assembly of Sindh as a candidate of Muttahida Qaumi Movement from constituency PS-103 (Karachi-XV) in the 2013 Pakistani general elections.

== Death ==
On 21 June 2013, Qureshi, 53, and his son were assassinated in a drive-by shooting in North Nazimabad, Karachi.

According to initial details, unidentified armed men opened fire at Qureshi’s car when he was returning home after Friday prayers along with his son.
