= Muhammad Yousaf Shahwani =

Pakistani politician

Member of the Provincial Assembly of Sindh
- In office 29 May 2013 – 28 May 2018

Personal details
- Born: 12 January 1971 (age 55) Quetta, Balochistan, Pakistan

Muhammad Yousaf Shahwani (born 12 January 1971) is a Pakistani politician who was a Member of the Provincial Assembly of Sindh from May 2013 to May 2018.

== Early life and education ==
He was born on 12 January 1971 in Quetta, and has a degree of Bachelor of Arts.

== Political career ==
He was elected to the Provincial Assembly of Sindh as a candidate for the Mutahida Quami Movement from Constituency PS-90 KARACHI-II in the 2013 Pakistani general election.
