= Naheed Begum =

Pakistani politician

Member of the Provincial Assembly of Sindh
- In office 2008 – 28 May 2018
- Constituency: Reserved seat for women

Personal details
- Born: 15 November 1975 (age 50) Sukkur, Sindh, Pakistan
- Party: MQM-P (2023-present)
- Other party: PSP (2018-2023); MQM-L (2008-2018)

Naheed Begum is a Pakistani politician who had been a Member of the Provincial Assembly of Sindh, from 2008 to May 2018.

== Early life and education ==
She was born on 15 November 1975 in Sukkur. According to another report, she was born on 15 December 1975.

She earned the degree of the Bachelor of Education, Bachelor of Science and Master of Arts, all from Shah Abdul Latif University.

== Political career ==
She was elected to the Provincial Assembly of Sindh as a candidate of Muttahida Qaumi Movement (MQM) on a reserved seat for women in the 2008 Pakistani general election.

She was re-elected to the Provincial Assembly of Sindh as a candidate of MQM on a reserved seat for women in the 2013 Pakistani general election.

In March 2018, she quit MQM and joined Pak Sarzameen Party (PSP).
