= Shazia Jawaid =

Pakistani politician

Member of the Provincial Assembly of Sindh
- In office June 2013 – 28 May 2018
- Constituency: Reserved seat for women

Personal details
- Born: 30 November 1979 (age 46) Karachi, Sindh, Pakistan

Shazia Jawaid is a Pakistani politician who had been a Member of the Provincial Assembly of Sindh, from June 2013 to May 2018.

== Early life ==
Jawaid was born on 30 November 1979.

== Political career ==
Jawaid was elected to the Provincial Assembly of Sindh as a candidate of Muttahida Qaumi Movement on a reserved seat for women in the 2013 Pakistani general election.
