= Kunwar Khalid Yunus =

Pakistani politician (born 1944)

Kunwar Khalid Younus is a Pakistani politician, and member of the Muttahida Qaumi Movement political party.

Yunus was born in the town of Sambhal, Uttar Pradesh, India on 30 September 1944 (his brother being the actor Tariq Yunus). Kunwar Khalid Yunus graduated from the University of Sindh, followed by a B.Sc. degree from Minnesota State University in the U.S. in 1986. He has been a Member of the National Assembly four times. He has served as MNA for the terms of 1988-1990, 1990–1992, 1997–1999 and 2002-2008. He is also a columnist, writing in both the Dawn and The Friday Times newspapers.
