= Muhammad Saleem Rajput =

Pakistani politician

Member of the Provincial Assembly of Sindh
- In office 29 May 2013 – 28 May 2018

Personal details
- Born: 28 March 1968 (age 58) Sukkur, Sindh, Pakistan

Muhammad Saleem Rajput is a Pakistani politician who had been a Member of the Provincial Assembly of Sindh, from May 2013 to May 2018.

== Early life and education ==
He was born on 28 March 1968 in Sukkur.

He has a degree of Bachelor of Commerce from Shah Abdul Latif University.

== Political career ==
He was elected to the Provincial Assembly of Sindh as a candidate of Mutahida Quami Movement from Constituency PS-1 SUKKUR-I in the 2013 Pakistani general election.
