= Muhammad Azeem Farooqui =

Pakistani politician

Member of the Provincial Assembly of Sindh
- In office 29 May 2013 – 28 May 2018

Personal details
- Born: 4 March 1962 (age 64) Karachi, Sindh, Pakistan

Muhammad Azeem Farooqui is a Pakistani politician who had been a Member of the Provincial Assembly of Sindh, from May 2013 to May 2018.

== Early life and education ==
He was born on 4 March 1962 in Karachi.

He has a degree of Bachelor of Arts from Karachi University.

== Political career ==
He was elected to the Provincial Assembly of Sindh as a candidate of Mutahida Quami Movement from Constituency PS-107 Karachi-XIX in the 2013 Pakistani general election.
