= Adnan Ahmed (politician) =

Pakistani politician

Member of the Provincial Assembly of Sindh
- In office 29 May 2013 – 28 May 2018

Personal details
- Born: 9 October 1980 (age 45) Karachi, Sindh, Pakistan

Adnan Ahmed is a Pakistani politician who was a Member of the Provincial Assembly of Sindh, from May 2013 to May 2018.

== Early life and education ==
He was born on 9 October 1980 in Karachi.

He has a Bachelor of Engineering degree from NED University Karachi.

== Political career ==
He was elected to the Provincial Assembly of Sindh as a candidate of Mutahida Quami Movement from Constituency PS-118 Karachi-XXX in the 2013 Pakistani general election.
