= Nusrat Sultana =

Pakistani politician

Member of the Provincial Assembly of Sindh
- In office June 2013 – 28 May 2018
- Constituency: Reserved seat for women

Personal details
- Born: 13 June 1952 (age 74) Mirpur Khas
- Party: Pakistan Peoples Party

Nusrat Sultana is a Pakistani politician who had been a Member of the Provincial Assembly of Sindh, from June 2013 to May 2018.

== Early life and education ==
She was born on 13 June 1952 in Mirpur Khas.

She has earned the degree of Master of Arts in Sindhi from the University of Sindh.

== Political career ==
She was elected to the Provincial Assembly of Sindh as a candidate of Pakistan Peoples Party on a reserved seat for women in the 2013 Pakistani general election.
