= Saleem Raza Jalbani =

Pakistani politician

Member of the Provincial Assembly of Sindh
- In office 29 May 2013 – 28 May 2018

Personal details
- Born: 21 June 1964 (age 61) Karachi
- Party: Pakistan Peoples Party

Saleem Raza Jalbani is a Pakistani politician who had been a Member of the Provincial Assembly of Sindh, from May 2013 to May 2018.

== Early life and education ==
He was born on 21 June 1964 in Karachi.

He has a degree of Bachelor of Arts from Sindh University.

== Political career ==
He was elected to the Provincial Assembly of Sindh as a candidate of Pakistan Peoples Party from Constituency PS-25 SHAHEED BANAZIR ABAD-II in the 2013 Pakistani general election.
