= Azam Saigol =

Pakistani businessman and politician

- Born: November 17, 1951
- Died: January 24, 2018 (aged 66); Boston, United States
- Resting place: Lahore, Pakistan
- Education: Aitchison College, Lahore, Government College University, Lahore, University of Oxford
- Occupations: Businessman, politician
- Organization: Pakistan International Airlines
- Term: 2016
- Predecessor: Ahmad Mukhtar
- Successor: Aijaz Haroon
- Board member of: Pakistan International Airlines
- Spouse: Amber Haroon Saigol
- Children: 4

Azam Saigol (17 November 1951 – 24 January 2018) was a Pakistani businessperson and politician. He held executive positions at Kohinoor Industries, Saritow Spinning Mills, Pak Elektron, and Azam Textile Mills. He was on the Pakistan International Airlines board from 2013 to 2016, and was its chairman in 2016.

== Early life and education ==
Saigol was born on 17 November 1951 to Mian Yousuf Saigol, who founded Saigol Group. He was educated at the Aitchison College, Lahore and Government College University, Lahore. For further education, he went to England and studied at the University of Oxford and earned a bachelor's degree in economics.

== Career ==
He held executive positions at Kohinoor Industries, Saritow Spinning Mills, Pak Elektron, and Azam Textile Mills. He was on the Pakistan International Airlines (PIA) board from 2013 to 2016, before being chairman in 2016. He resigned in December 2016 citing personal reasons. Press noted that a week prior, a PIA plane had crashed with 47 fatalities, with The News stating that Saigol had been pressured to resign afterwards. The airline went without a chairman until December 21, 2016, when Prime Minister Nawaz Sharif announced that the chairmanship had gone to Irfan Elahi, Aviation Secretary.

== Personal life ==
He was married to Amber Haroon Saigol, a scion of Haroon family, who heads Dawn. His eldest brother was Rafique Saigol (1933-2003). Azam's daughter, Nazafreen Saigol Lakhani, married into the Lakhani family. Saigol died on 24 January 2018. Mian Muhammad Mansha (Nishat Group, MCB) is married to the sister of Azam Sehgal.
