= Mahtab Rashdi =

Pakistani television host and government official

Mahtab Akbar Rashdi

Member of the Provincial Assembly of Sindh
- In office June 2013 – 28 May 2018
- Constituency: Reserved seat for women

Personal details
- Born: Mahtab Channa; 3 March 1947 (age 79) Naudero, Sindh, British India
- Spouse: Akbar Rashdi (m. 1981)
- Children: 2
- Education: University of Massachusetts
- Occupation: Politician; Host; Human Rights Activist; Actress; Anchor
- Awards: Pride of Performance (2004)

Mahtab Akbar Rashdi (Urdu: ماہتاب اکبر راشدی، née Channa) is a Pakistani television host and anchor, actress, government official, politician, and campaigner for human rights. She was a Member of the Provincial Assembly of Sindh, from June 2013 to May 2018.

== Early life and education ==
She was born on 3 March 1947 in Naudero. She earned a Bachelor of Arts degree from Government Girls College Hyderabad. She received the Bachelor of Education and the degree of Master of Arts in Political Science, both from the University of Sindh. She also did Master of Arts in Political Science from University of Massachusetts on the Fulbright Scholarship.

== Career ==
Mahtab started working at Radio Pakistan as a child actress and then she worked in PTV dramas. Later she started hosting children shows and then she co-hosted Roshan Tara and Feroza with her friend Khushbakht Shujaat.

In 2004, President of Pakistan awarded her the Pride of Performance for her contributions towards the television industry.

== Political career ==
She was elected to the Provincial Assembly of Sindh as a candidate of Pakistan Muslim League (F) on a reserved seat for women in the 2013 Pakistani general election.

== Personal life ==
In 1981, she married Akbar Rashdi, a Bureaucrat. Later, she herself joined bureaucracy and started heading several departments including education, information and culture. She has two children.

== Awards and recognition ==
Year	Award	Category	Result	Title	Ref.
2004	Pride of Performance	Award by the President of Pakistan	Won	Arts	
