= Gohar Ejaz =

Pakistani real estate tycoon

Federal Minister for Interior, Commerce, Industries, and Production
- In office 20 December 2023 – 11 March 2024
- Preceded by: Sarfraz Bugti (Interior); Naveed Qamar (Commerce); Makhdoom Syed Murtaza Mehmood (Industries and Production)
- Succeeded by: Mohsin Naqvi (Interior); Jam Kamal Khan (Commerce); Rana Tanveer Hussain (Industries and Production)

Personal details
- Parent: Sheikh Ejaz Ahmad (father)
- Education: University of Punjab
- Profession: Entrepreneur, Philanthropist, Industrialist
- Awards: Sitara-e-Imtiaz
- Website: goharejaz.pk

Gohar Ejaz is a Pakistani real estate tycoon and philanthropist. He is the chairman of Ejaz Group which mainly owns Lake City in Lahore and 24 Digital.

Ejaz was the caretaker Federal Minister for Interior, Commerce and Minister for Trade, Industry and Production from 17 August 2023 to March 2024.

== Early life ==
Gohar Ejaz was born to a Chinioti business family. His father, Sheikh Ejaz Ahmad, served as a member of the Senate of Pakistan.

== Career ==
After completing his education, Ejaz joined the family business. In 1995, he established Ejaz Power Limited, a captive power plant for the group's textile operations.

Ejaz became actively involved with the All Pakistan Textile Mills Association (APTMA), an organization that manages industry relations with the government. In 2003, he played a key role in the leadership change within APTMA, leading over 100 members to demand the resignation of the then-chairman, Waqar Monnoo.

In 2004, Ejaz launched Lake City in Lahore, a real estate project covering more than 2,000 acres, with investors including Shahid Iqbal of Mayfair and the Sapphire Group. However, by 2006, Ejaz Textile Mills faced financial difficulties, leading to defaults and challenges in the Lake City project.

In 2011, Ejaz publicly acknowledged President Asif Ali Zardari's implementation of policies favoring the textile industry, including measures aligned with the All Pakistan Textile Mills Association (APTMA) agenda. Following his one-year term as APTMA chairman, Ejaz retained influence despite heading a relatively small textile operation. During this period, he built alliances with smaller textile firms, challenging larger, established players. After his term ended, Ejaz assumed a newly created "patron-in-chief" role at APTMA—a position with greater authority than that of chairman—which he held until 2023.

Ejaz held positions such as Chairman of the APTMA Punjab Region (2009–10) and national Chairman (2010–11). Later, Ejaz also served on the boards of various institutions, including National Textile University, Government College University, Lahore, King Edward Medical University, Care Foundation Lahore, Punjab Institute of Cardiology, Punjab Social Security Health Company, and Lahore General Hospital.

Ejaz continued to maintain relations with Zardari, hosting a 2014 dinner for him and Pakistan Peoples Party (PPP) co-chairman. He also developed close relations with the military establishment and was at times referred to by observers as a "PR King".

In January 2024, Ejaz was appointed the Caretaker Federal Interior Minister. He assumed this role in addition to his current responsibilities as Federal Minister for Commerce, Industry and Production. This appointment has been implemented after the resignation of former Caretaker Home Minister Sarfraz Bugti.

== Lake City ==
Ejaz founded Lake City Lahore in 2004, a real estate development covering 2,000 acres and designed by the firm Meinhardt. In 2005, Lake City saw the construction of a mosque, the opening of the main office, and its international launch, alongside developments in the Bella Vista area. Initially, Lake City faced challenges, leading several backers from the textile industrialists to withdraw their support. Ejaz subsequently purchased their stakes and adopted measures to promote the development, such as allocating land for events such as the Coca-Cola Food and Music Festival (Coke Fest) and providing rent-free commercial spaces to businesses. This helped increase the value of its commercial areas.

By 2014, Lake City Housing Society was facing issues such as land disputes, incomplete developments, and insufficient infrastructure, which led to delays in transferring land ownership to plot owners. Affected residents appealed to then Chief Minister Shehbaz Sharif for intervention regarding the management of the housing society.

The inauguration of the Lahore Ring Road in 2018, a six-lane highway encircling Lahore with entry and exit points near Lake City, improved the area's accessibility. In the same year, Lake City hosted another Coca-Cola Food and Music Festival at the Lake City Golf and Country Club. Additionally, the golf course within Lake City is reported to be exclusively available to Ejaz and his associates, including politicians and businessmen, making it the only private golf course in Pakistan.

== Philanthropy ==
Ejaz has funded the Sheikh Ejaz Ahmed Dialysis Centre at Jinnah Hospital, Lahore, and the Indus Hospital in Lahore.

== Wealth ==
As of 2023, Ejaz's wealth included stock market shares worth over Rs 1.50 billion, jewellery worth Rs 40.36 million and cash in banks worth Rs 10.60 million. His younger children owned more than 1.57 billion rupees.

== Awards and honors ==
Gohar Ejaz was awarded the Hilal-e-Imtiaz (Crescent of Excellence) Award in 2012 by the President of Pakistan.

He was also awarded an honorary doctorate in management from Punjab University, Lahore.
