= Naila Munir =

Pakistani politician

Member of the Provincial Assembly of Sindh
- In office June 2013 – 28 May 2018
- Constituency: Reserved seat for women

Personal details
- Born: 11 April 1962 (age 64) Karachi, Sindh, Pakistan
- Party: MQM-P (2023-present)
- Other party: PSP (2018-2023); MQM-L (2013-2018)

Naila Munir is a Pakistani politician who had been a Member of the Provincial Assembly of Sindh, from June 2013 to May 2018.

== Early life ==
She was born on 11 April 1962 in Karachi.

== Political career ==
She was elected to the Provincial Assembly of Sindh as a candidate of Muttahida Qaumi Movement on a reserved seat for women in the 2013 Pakistani general election.

In March 2018, she quit MQM and joined Pak Sarzameen Party (PSP).
