= Naila Musayeva =

Naila Musaeva Nailə Musayeva
- Born: September 7, 1957 (age 68); Baku
- Scientific career
- Workplaces: Institute of Control Systems of ANAS

Naila Musaeva (Azerbaijani: Nailə Fuad qızı Musayeva) is a professor at the Department of Information Technologies and Systems at the Azerbaijan University of Architecture and Construction. She is also Doctor of Engineering, Professor, and Head of Laboratory at the Institute of Control Systems of ANAS.

== National grants ==
- 2012–2015, Science Fund at the State Oil Company of Azerbaijan Republic (SOCAR),

== Membership ==
- 2002–present, Member of the Dissertation Council at the Institute of Control Systems conferring academic degrees of Doctor of Science and PhD in the following specialties: Computer sciences; Information measurement systems and control systems; System analysis, control and information processing;
- 2002–present, Member of the Science Council at the Institute of Control Systems;
- 2017 – Member of the Educational-methodical board at the Azerbaijan University of Architecture and Construction.

== Publications ==
About 160 proceedings were published in this area. The notable ones include:

- Aliev T.A., Musaeva N.F., Suleymanova M.T., Gazizade B.I. Density Function of Noise Distribution as an Indicator for Identifying the Degree of Fault Growth in Sucker Rod Pumping Unit (SRPU)// Journal of Automation and Information Sciences, Vol.49, Issue 4, 2017, p. 1-11, by Begell House, New-York, Springer
- Aliev T.A., Musaeva N.F., Suleymanova M.T., Gazizade B.I. Technology for calculating the parameters of the density function of normal distribution of the useful component in a noisy process // Journal of Automation and Information Sciences, Vol.48, No2, 2016, p. 35-55, by Begell House, New-York, Springer
- Aliev T.A., Musaeva N.F., Suleymanova M.T., Gazizade B.I. Analytic representation of the density function of normal distribution of noise // Journal of Automation and Information Sciences, 47(8), 2015, by Begell House, New-York, Springer, p. 24-40
- T.A. Aliev, N.F. Musaeva and Sattarova U.E. Noise Technologies for Operating the System for Monitoring of the Beginning of Violation of Seismic Stability of Construction Objects// Editors: Lotfi A. Zadeh, Ali M. Abbasov, Ronald R. Yager, Shahnaz N. Shahbazova, Marek Z. // Recent Developments and New Directions in Soft Computing. Studies in Fuzziness and Soft Computing, Volume 317, 2014, pp. 211–232, Springer
- T.A. Aliev, N.F. Musaeva and Sattarova U.E. The technology of forming the normalized correlation matrices of the matrix equations of multidimensional stochastic objects. Journal of Automation and Information Sciences, 45(1), 2013 by Begell House, New-York, Springer, p. 1-15
- T.A. Aliev, N.F. Musaeva and Sattarova U.E. Robust technologies for calculating normalized correlation functions, Cybernetics and Systems Analysis, New-York, Springer, Vol. 46, No. 1, 2010, pp. 153–166
- Musaeva N.F. Robust correlation coefficients as initial data for solving a problem of confluent analysis. Automatic Control and Computer Sciences. Allerton Press. Inc., New York, No 2, 2007, pp. 76–87
- T.A. Aliev and N.F. Musaeva. Technology of experimental research of the stochastic processes, Automatic Control and Computer Sciences. Allerton Press. Inc., New York, No 4, 2005, pp. 15–26
- N.F.Musaeva. Technology for determining the magnitude of robustness as an estimate of statistical characteristic of noisy signal, Automatic Control and Computer Sciences. Allerton Press. Inc., New York, No 5, 2005, pp. 64–74

== Textbooks ==
1. Мусаева Н.Ф. Построение математических моделей. Методы и современные компьютерные технологии. Учебник, 2014, 310 pp. Lambert, Germany
2. Мусаева Н.Ф. Информационные технологии обработки экспериментальных данных. Учебник, Баку, 2007, 260 с. (Azərbaycan Respublikası Təhsil Nazirliyinin 26/04/2007-ci il tarixli 368 nömrəli əmri ilə təsdiq edilmişdir)
3. Musayeva N.F. Təcrübi verilənlərin işlənməsinin informasiya texnologiyaları. Dərslik, Bakı, 2007, 245 s. (Azərbaycan Respublikası Təhsil Nazirliyinin 26/04/2007-ci il tarixli 367 nömrəli əmri ilə təsdiq edilmişdir)

== Monographs ==
1. Musayeva N.F. Riyazi modellərin qurulması. Üsullar və müasir kompüter texnologiyaları. Bakı, 2014. 386 s.
2. Мусаева Н.Ф. Алгоритмы улучшения обусловленности корреляционных матриц. Baku, Elm, 2000, p. 95
