= PS-129 Karachi Central-VIII =

Constituency of the Provincial Assembly of Sindh, Pakistan

- Constituency for the Provincial Assembly of Sindh
- District: Karachi Central District
- Region: Liaquatabad Town (partly) and North Nazimabad Town (partly)
- Electorate: 283,906

Current constituency
- Member: Vacant
- Created from: PS-103 Karachi-XV (2002-2018); PS-129 Karachi Central-VII (2018-2023)
- City: Karachi

PS-129 Karachi Central-VIII (پی ایس-129، کراچی وسطی-8) is a constituency of the Provincial Assembly of Sindh.

== General elections 2024 ==
General elections will be held on 8 February 2024.

Provincial election 2024: PS-129 Karachi Central-VIII
| Party | Candidate | Votes | % | ±% |
|---|---|---|---|---|
| JI | Hafiz Naeem ur Rehman | 26,296 | 31.48 | |
| MQM-P | Maaz Mukaddam | 20,608 | 24.67 | |
| PPP | Muhammad Asad Hanif | 15,014 | 17.98 | |
| PTI | Saif Bari (Note: Filed nomination papers as PTI candidate but ECP allowed him to run as an Independent) | 11,357 | 13.60 | |
| Independent | Farah Farooqui | 2,361 | 2.83 | |
| PML(N) | Muhammad Aslam Khan | 2,106 | 2.52 | |
| TLP | Muhammad Ahmed Hassan Raza | 1,427 | 1.71 | |
| Others | Others (thirty one candidates) | 4,352 | 5.21 | |
| Turnout | | 83,606 | 31.73 | |
| Total valid votes | | 83,521 | 99.90 | |
| Rejected ballots | | 85 | 0.10 | |
| Majority | | 5,688 | 6.81 | |
| Registered electors | | 263,532 | | |
| JI gain from PTI | | | | |

== General elections 2018 ==
General election 2018: PS-129 (Karachi Central-VII)

Provincial election 2018: PS-129 Karachi Central-VII
| Party | Candidate | Votes | % | ±% |
|---|---|---|---|---|
| PTI | Imran Ali Shah | 39,101 | 41.30 | |
| MQM-P | Maaz Muqaddam | 17,697 | 18.69 | |
| MMA | Naeem Ur Rehman | 14,246 | 15.05 | |
| PSP | Faisal Moiz Khan | 6,771 | 7.15 | |
| PPP | Dil Muhammad | 6,344 | 6.70 | |
| PML(N) | Muhammad Touqeer Randhawa | 3,973 | 4.20 | |
| TLP | Hanif Shah | 2,705 | 2.86 | |
| ANP | Niaz Muhammad Khan | 1,845 | 1.95 | |
| AAT | Muhammad Suleman | 1,012 | 1.07 | |
| APML | Syed Sarfaraz Ali | 367 | 0.39 | |
| GDA | Owais Zahid Rana | 159 | 0.17 | |
| Independent | Mahammad Ali Tak Chhipa | 153 | 0.16 | |
| Independent | Umair Ul Ebad Khan | 73 | 0.08 | |
| Independent | Farhan Chishti | 65 | 0.07 | |
| PP | Muhammad Sadiq | 52 | 0.05 | |
| PML(Q) | Pirzada Muhammad Anwar Shah | 49 | 0.05 | |
| Independent | Nusra Kamran | 20 | 0.02 | |
| Independent | Rehan Mansoor | 17 | 0.02 | |
| Independent | Syeda Rabia Khaliq | 14 | 0.01 | |
| Independent | Asif Ali Khan | 10 | 0.01 | |
| Majority | | 21,404 | 22.61 | |
| Valid ballots | | 94,673 | | |
| Rejected ballots | | 1,610 | | |
| Turnout | | 96,283 | | |
| Registered electors | | 232,162 | | |
| hold | | | | |

== General elections 2013 ==
General election 2013: PS-103 (Karachi-XV)
| Party | Candidate | Votes | % | ±% |
|---|---|---|---|---|
| MQM | Sajid Qureshi | 40,613 | | |
| PTI | Zareena Sarwar | 17781 | | |
| JI | Hafiz Naeem ur Rehman | 6441 | | |
| MDM | Abdur Rauf | 5149 | | |
| PML(N) | Syed Zahid Ali Shah | 2366 | | |
| PPP | Dilbar Wali Doghani | 1147 | | |
| Independent | Qayyum Khan | 779 | | |
| Independent | Moulana Zareen Shah | 208 | | |
| Independent | Syed Minhajuddin | 25 | | |
| Independent | Jawaid Shoukat | 19 | | |
| Independent | Saleem Khan | 12 | | |
| Independent | Suleman Khan | 9 | | |
| PFP | Syed Asif Ali | 8 | | |
| Independent | Faisal Tasleem | 7 | | |
| Independent | Najam Idrees Khan | 5 | | |
| Independent | Habibullah | 4 | | |
| Independent | Dr. Qari Sadaqat Ali Khan | 3 | | |
| Independent | Haji Aziz Ur Rehman Gujjar | 3 | | |
| Total valid votes | | 74585 | 51.63 | |
| Rejected ballots | | 3489 | | |
| Registered electors | | 150,258 | | |

== See also ==
- PS-128 Karachi Central-VII
- PS-130 Karachi Central-IX
