= Irum Azeem Farooque =

Pakistani politician

Provincial Assembly of Sindh
- In office June 2013 – 28 May 2018
- Constituency: Reserved seat for women

Personal details
- Born: 5 February 1967 (age 59) Karachi, Sindh, Pakistan

Irum Azeem Farooque is a Pakistani politician who was a member of the Provincial Assembly of Sindh, from June 2013 to May 2018.

== Early life and education ==
She was born on 5 February 1967 in Karachi. She has earned the Bachelor of Arts from Bamm PECHS Government College for Women.

== Political career ==
She was elected to the Provincial Assembly of Sindh as a candidate of Muttahida Qaumi Movement (MQM) on a reserved seat for women in the 2013 Pakistani general election.

In September 2014, she quit MQM and announced to resign from her Sindh Assembly seat however in October 2014, she re-joined MQM.

In August 2017, she quit MQM.
