= Aijaz Ali Shah Sheerazi =

Pakistani politician

Aijaz Ali Shah Sherazi

Member of Provincial Assembly of Sindh
- In office May 2013 – June 2018
- Constituency: Thatta-I

Advisor to Chief Minister of Sindh
- In office 2018–2020

Personal details
- Died: 10 December 2020
- Party: Pakistan Peoples Party; Pakistan Muslim League N(until 2018)

Aijaz Ali Shah Sheerazi was a Pakistani politician who had been a Member of the Provincial Assembly of Sindh, from May 2013 to May 2018.

== Political career ==
He was elected to the Provincial Assembly of Sindh as an independent candidate from Constituency PS-84 Thatta-I in the 2013 Pakistani general election.

In 2018, He was appointed as Advisor to Chief Minister of Sindh on Social Welfare department.

== Death ==
He died from COVID-19 on 10 December 2020.
