= Zubair Ahmed Khan =

Pakistani politician

- Constituency: PP 29

Personal details
- Born: 20 December 1970 (age 55) Tanda, Gujrat, Pakistan

Zubair Ahmed Khan is a Pakistani politician who had been a candidate for Member of the Provincial Assembly of Punjab.

== Early life and education ==
He was born on 27 July 1970 in Gujrat, Pakistan.

He has a degree of Bachelor of Commerce, a degree of Master of Arts in Economics, and a degree of Master of Business Administration.

== Political career ==
He was elected to the Provincial Assembly of Sindh as a candidate of Mutahida Quami Movement from Constituency PS-48 HYDERABAD-IV in the 2013 Pakistani general election.
