= Nishat Muhammad Zia Qadri =

Pakistani politician

Member of the Provincial Assembly of Sindh
- In office 29 May 2013 – 28 May 2018

Personal details
- Born: 2 April 1966 (age 60) Karachi, Sindh, Pakistan

Nishat Muhammad Zia Qadri is a Pakistani politician who had been a Member of the Provincial Assembly of Sindh, from May 2013 to May 2018.

== Early life and education ==
He was born on 2 April 1966 in Karachi.

He has a degree of Bachelor of Commerce from Karachi University.

== Political career ==
He was elected to the Provincial Assembly of Sindh as a candidate of Mutahida Quami Movement from Constituency PS-120 KARACHI-XXXII in the 2013 Pakistani general election.
