= Amir Haider Shah Sheerazi =

Pakistani politician

Member of the Provincial Assembly of Sindh
- In office 29 May 2013 – 28 May 2018

Personal details
- Born: 4 September 1981 (age 44) Thatta, Sindh, Pakistan

Amir Haider Shah Sheerazi is a Pakistani politician who had been a Member of the Provincial Assembly of Sindh from May 2013 to May 2018.

== Early life ==
He was born on 4 September 1981 in Thatta.

== Political career ==
He was elected to the Provincial Assembly of Sindh as an independent candidate from Constituency PS-85 THATTA-II in the 2013 Pakistani general election.
