= Faqir Dad Khoso =

Pakistani politician

Member of the Provincial Assembly of Sindh
- In office 29 May 2013 – 28 May 2018

Personal details
- Born: 8 August 1957 (age 68) Jamshoro
- Party: Pakistan Peoples Party

Faqir Dad Khoso is a Pakistani politician who had been a Member of the Provincial Assembly of Sindh, from May 2013 to May 2018.

== Early life and education ==
He was born on 8 August 1957 in Jamshoro.

He has a Bachelors of Arts degree from Sindh University.

== Political career ==
He was elected to the Provincial Assembly of Sindh as a candidate of Pakistan Peoples Party from Constituency PS-72 Jamshoro-II in the 2013 Pakistani general election.
