= Fakir Dungaria =

Indian cricketer

Fakir Dungaria (born 6 October 1969) is a ex first class Indian cricketer who played for Gujarat. He made a single first-class appearance for the side, during the 1991–92 season, against Baroda. From the lower-middle order, he scored 21 runs in the first innings in which he batted, and 9 runs in the second. Fakir also played Cooch Bihar trophy for Gujarat Under-19 team from 1989 to 1992.

Dungaria is from a small town called Daman in India. In 1985 he started playing cricket for local clubs called Jawan Tandel cricket club (Nani Daman) and Vadilal CC (Vapi). He was spotted by Maheshbhai Pithawalla from Bhimpore, Surat. In 1987, Pithawalla offered him an open invitation to play for his own club called Pithawalla Sports Club. Dungaria accepted and delivered strong performances at the level of club and for the Surat district cricket association. By 1992 he played Cooch Bihar trophy for Gujarat Under-19 and made a first class cricket debut in Ranji trophy for Gujarat state, Same year 1992 Fakir Dungaria left India to settle down in the UK.

Between 1993 and 2008, Dungaria played for Broadstairs cricket club in Kent Cricket League. In 2009, Dungaria joined to played for Radlett in the Home Counties Premier League. In between he also played for Uxbridge Middlesex League, Syston Leicestershire league, and Hertfordshire cricket league for Broxbourne cricket club as well as different cricket clubs in various leagues in the UK. In 2016 Dungaria went back to his old club Radlett CC playing 1st team premier league cricket in Saracens Hertfordshire Premier Cricket League.

In 2020 he played for Hertfordshire Over50's and same year he made into the England Over50's (International) to play against Wales Over50's.

In 2021 Fakir Dungaria joined Middlesex to play Over50's County cricket.

In 2022 Fakir Dungaria decided to play for his own birth country India and successfully switched from England veterans to veteran cricket India.

In 2023 Fakir Dungaria made to the Indian squad and played Over50's IMC cricket World Cup for India which was held in March 2023 in Cape Town. (South Africa)

2024 Fakir Dungaria again appears to play for India but this time it was for Over40's IMC cricket World Cup which was held from feb/mar 2024 in Cape Town (South Africa)

2025 Fakir Dungaria again successfully made it to the final squad of India to play IMC cricket World Cup which was held in Colombo (Sri Lanka) February 2025. Fakir had a stand out performance with bat and ball scoring 304 runs including becoming a first ever batsman to score a ton in the Over50's World Cup's history for India. Opposition were Canada (124 not out in 117 balls) Fakir even took 10 wickets in the tournament with his left arm spin bowling for India which earned him a 5th place in the most valuable player list in the World Cup ranking.

https://www.espncricinfo.com/player/fakir-dungaria-28295

https://www.youtube.com/live/huXwlzZ07TA?feature=share

https://masterscricket.org/over-50/50swc25/

https://cricheroes.com/tournament/1317218/imc-over-50s-world-cup-2025-/matches/live-matches
