= Mahfooz Yar Khan =

Pakistani politician

Member of the Provincial Assembly of Sindh
- In office June 2016 – 28 May 2018

Personal details
- Born: 19 January 1950 (age 76) Uttar Pradesh, India
- Other political affiliations: Mutahida Quami Movement

Mahfooz Yar Khan (born 19 January 1950) is a Pakistani politician who was a Member of the Provincial Assembly of Sindh, from June 2016 to May 2018.

== Early life and education ==
He was born on 19 January 1950 in Uttar Pradesh, India.

He has a degree of Bachelors of Arts, a degree of Master of Arts and a degree of Bachelor of Laws, all from Karachi University.

He also has a degree of Master of Laws and a degree of Doctor of Philosophy.

== Political career ==
He was elected to the Provincial Assembly of Sindh as a candidate of Mutahida Quami Movement from Constituency PS-106 KARACHI-XVIII in by-polls held in June 2016.
