= Jamal Ahmed =

Pakistani politician

Member of the Provincial Assembly of Sindh
- In office 29 May 2013 – 28 May 2018

Personal details
- Born: 23 December 1965 (age 60) Karachi, Sindh, Pakistan
- Party: MQM-P (2018-present)
- Other political affiliations: MQM-L (2013-2016)

Jamal Ahmed (born 23 December 1965) is a Pakistani politician who had been a Member of the Provincial Assembly of Sindh from May 2013 to May 2018.

== Early life ==
He was born in Karachi.

== Political career ==
He was elected to the Provincial Assembly of Sindh as a candidate of Mutahida Quami Movement from Constituency PS-101 KARACHI-XIII in the 2013 Pakistani general election.
