= NA-226 Jamshoro =

Constituency of the National Assembly of Pakistan

- Constituency for the National Assembly of Pakistan
- Region: Jamshoro District
- Electorate: 477,062

Current constituency
- Party: Pakistan People's Party
- Member: Asad Sikandar
- Created from: NA-231 Dadu-I

NA-226 Jamshoro (این اے-226، جامشورو) is a constituency for the National Assembly of Pakistan.

== Assembly Segments ==
Constituency number	Constituency	District	Current MPA	Party
77	PS-77 Jamshoro-I	Jamshoro District	Murad Ali Shah	PPP
78	PS-78 Jamshoro-II	Jamshoro District	Sikandar Ali Shoro	PPP
79	PS-79 Jamshoro-III	Jamshoro District	Malik Sikandar Khan	PPP

== Members of Parliament ==
=== 2018–2023: NA-233 Jamshoro ===
Election	Member	Party
2018	Sikander Ali Rahupoto	PPPP

=== 2018–2023: NA-233 Jamshoro ===
Election	Member	Party
2024	Asad Sikandar	PPPP

== Election 2002 ==
General elections were held on 10 October 2002. Nawab Abdul Ghani Talpur of PPP won by 76,568 votes.

General election 2002: NA-231 Dadu-I
Party	Candidate	Votes	%	±%
PPP	Nawab Abdul Ghani Talpur	76,568	63.41	
Independent	Syed Jalal Mehmood	39,320	32.56	
MQM	Ali Nawaz Shoro	4,035	3.34	
Others	Others (four candidates)	823	0.69	
Turnout		123,168	36.14	
Total valid votes		120,746	98.03	
Rejected ballots		2,422	1.97	
Majority		37,248	30.85	
Registered electors		340,793		

== Election 2008 ==
General elections were held on 18 February 2008. Nawab Abdul Ghani Talpur of PPP won by 138,380 votes.

General election 2008: NA-231 Dadu-I
Party	Candidate	Votes	%	±%
PPP	Nawab Abdul Ghani Talpur	138,320	76.35	
SUP	Syed Jalal Mehmood	33,362	18.42	
Others	Others (nine candidates)	9,475	5.23	
Turnout		186,271	37.25	
Total valid votes		181,157	97.25	
Rejected ballots		5,114	2.75	
Majority		104,958	57.93	
Registered electors		500,064		
PPP hold				

== Election 2013 ==
General elections were held on 11 May 2013. Malik Asad Sikandar of PPP won by 129,500 votes and became the member of National Assembly.

General election 2013: NA-231 Dadu-I
Party	Candidate	Votes	%	±%
PPP	Malik Asad Sikandar	129,500	64.00	
SUP	Syed Jalal Mehmood	58,528	28.93	
Others	Others (fourteen candidates)	14,303	7.07	
Turnout		210,025	56.85	
Total valid votes		202,331	96.34	
Rejected ballots		7,694	3.66	
Majority		70,972	35.07	
Registered electors		369,425		
PPP hold				

== Election 2018 ==
General elections were held on 25 July 2018.

General election 2018: NA-233 Jamshoro
Party	Candidate	Votes	%	±%
PPP	Sikander Ali Rahupoto	133,492	58.19	
SUP	Syed Jalal Mehmood	81,289	35.43	
Others	Others (eight candidates)	14,625	6.38	
Turnout		240,323	56.35	
Total valid votes		229,406	95.46	
Rejected ballots		10,917	4.54	
Majority		52,203	22.76	
Registered electors		426,469		
PPP hold		Swing	N/A	

== Election 2024 ==
Elections were held on 8 February 2024. Asad Sikandar won the election with 165,044 votes.

General election 2024: NA-226 Jamshoro
Party	Candidate	Votes	%	±%
PPP	Malik Asad Sikandar	165,044	74.23	▲16.04
GDA	Syed Munir Hyder Shah	30,876	13.89	▼21.54^{†}
Others	Others (nine candidates)	26,419	11.88	
Turnout		231,017	48.42	▼7.93
Total valid votes		222,339	96.24	
Rejected ballots		8,678	3.76	
Majority		134,168	60.34	▲37.58
Registered electors		477,062		
PPP hold				

^{†} SUP contested as part of the GDA

== See also ==
- NA-225 Thatta
- NA-227 Dadu-I
