= NA-225 Thatta =

Constituency of the National Assembly of Pakistan

- Constituency for the National Assembly of Pakistan
- Region: Thatta District
- Electorate: 522,386

Current constituency
- Party: Pakistan People's Party
- Member: Sadiq Ali Memon
- Created from: NA-237 Thatta-I

NA-225 Thatta (این اے-225، ٹهٹهہ) is a constituency for the National Assembly of Pakistan.

== Assembly Segments ==
Constituency number	Constituency	District	Current MPA	Party
75	PS-75 Thatta-I	Thatta District	Riaz Hussain Shah Sheerazi	PPP
76	PS-76 Thatta-II	Thatta District	Ali Hassan Zardari	PPP

== Members of Parliament ==
=== 2018–2023: NA-232 Thatta ===
Election	Member	Party
2018	Shamsunnisa Memon	PPPP

=== 2024–present: NA-225 Thatta ===
Election	Member	Party
2024	Sadiq Ali Memon	PPPP

== Election 2002 ==
General elections were held on 10 October 2002. Syed Ayaz Ali Shah Sheerazi of PML-Q won by 57,195 votes.

General election 2002: NA-237 Thatta-I
Party	Candidate	Votes	%	±%
PML(Q)	Syed Ayaz Ali Shah Sheerazi	57,195	48.76	
PPP	Abdul Wahid Soomro	53,616	45.71	
MQM	Syed Mehar Ali Shah	3,606	3.07	
MMA	Ahmed Alias Abu Al-Ashraf Soomro	2,874	2.46	
Turnout		121,507	36.86	
Total valid votes		117,291	96.53	
Rejected ballots		4,216	3.47	
Majority		3,579	3.05	
Registered electors		329,639		

== Election 2008 ==
General elections were held on 18 February 2008. Dr. Abdul Wahid Soomro of PPP won by votes.

General election 2008: NA-237 Thatta-I
Party	Candidate	Votes	%	±%
PPP	Abdul Wahid Soomro	85,138	60.11	
PML(Q)	Syed Riaz Hussain Shah Sheerazi	56,052	39.58	
Others	Others (two candidates)	443	0.31	
Turnout		147,549	34.41	
Total valid votes		141,633	95.99	
Rejected ballots		5,916	4.01	
Majority		29,086	20.53	
Registered electors		428,846		
PPP hold				

== Election 2013 ==
General elections were held on 11 May 2013. Sadiq Ali Memon of PPP won and became the member of National Assembly.

General election 2013: NA-237 Thatta-I
Party	Candidate	Votes	%	±%
PPP	Sadiq Ali Memon	86,746	43.40	
Independent	Syed Riaz Hussain Shah Sheerazi	83,055	41.55	
PML(N)	Marvi Memon	23,598	11.81	
Others	Others (thirteen candidates)	6,487	3.24	
Turnout		210,795	58.11	
Total valid votes		199,886	94.82	
Rejected ballots		10,909	5.18	
Majority		3,691	1.85	
Registered electors		362,768		
PPP hold				

== By-election 2013 ==
A by-election was held due to the disqualification of Sadiq Ali Memon. Shamsunnisa Memon of PPP won the election with 84,819 votes.

By-election 2013: NA-237 Thatta-I
Party	Candidate	Votes	%	±%
PPP	Shamsunnisa Memon	84,819	54.91	
PML(N)	Syed Riaz Hussain Shah Sheerazi	64,570	41.80	
Others	Others (sixteen candidates)	5,068	3.29	
Turnout		159,944	44.69	
Total valid votes		154,457	96.57	
Rejected ballots		5,847	3.43	
Majority		20,249	13.11	
Registered electors		357,930		
PPP hold				

== Election 2018 ==
General elections were held on 25 July 2018.

General election 2018: NA-232 Thatta
Party	Candidate	Votes	%	±%
PPP	Shamsunnisa Memon	152,691	83.67	
PTI	Arslan Bakhsh Brohi	18,900	10.36	
Others	Others (five candidates)	10,893	5.97	
Turnout		191,166	43.41	
Total valid votes		182,484	95.46	
Rejected ballots		8,682	4.54	
Majority		133,791	73.31	
Registered electors		440,329		
PPP hold		Swing	N/A	

== Election 2024 ==
Elections were held on 8 February 2024. Sadiq Ali Memon won the election with 140,773 votes.

General election 2024: NA-225 Thatta
Party	Candidate	Votes	%	±%
PPP	Sadiq Ali Memon	140,773	75.40	▼8.27
PML(N)	Rasool Bux Jakhro	28,899	15.48	▲13.99
Others	Others (nine candidates)	17,069	9.14	
Turnout		194,991	37.33	▼6.08
Total valid votes		186,701	95.75	
Rejected ballots		8,290	4.25	
Majority		111,874	59.92	▼13.31
Registered electors		522,386		
PPP hold				

== See also ==
- NA-224 Sujawal
- NA-226 Jamshoro
