= List of members of the 10th Provincial Assembly of Sindh =

Elections for the 10th Provincial assembly of Sindh were held on 6 October 1993, along with general election for National Assembly of Pakistan & provincial elections in Punjab, Balochistan & N.W.F.P.

== List of members of the 10th Provincial Assembly of Sindh ==
The tenure of the 10th Provincial assembly of Sindh was from 18 October 1993, till 7 November 1996.

Serial	Name	Constituency	District
1	Jam Mumtaz Hussain Dahar	PS-1	Ghotki
2	Sardar Ahmed Ali Khan Pitafi	PS-2	Ghotki
3	Sardar Ali Gohar Khan Mahar	PS-3	Ghotki
4	Ghulam Mustafa Bozdar	PS-4	Sukkur
5	Taj Mohammad Shaikh	PS-5	Sukkur
6	Ghulam Qadir Bhutto	PS-6	Sukkur
7	Agha Siraj Khan Durrani	PS-7	Shikarpur
8	Agha Tariq Khan	PS-8	Shikarpur
9	Ghous Bux Khan Mahar	PS-9	Shikarpur
10	Ghalib Hussain Domki	PS-10	Jacobabad.
11	Sardar Sher Mohammad Khan Bijarani	PS-11	Jacobabad.
12	Sohrab Khan Sarki	PS-12	Jacobabad.
13	Mohammad Yaqoob Khan Khoso	PS-13	Jacobabad.
14	Gohar Ali Shahliani	PS-14	Jacobabad.
15	Malhar Khan Rajpar	PS-15	Nausheroferoze
16	Syed Murad Ali Shah	PS-16	Nausheroferoze
17	Syed Munawar Ali Shah	PS-17	Nausheroferoze
18	Ghulam Rasool Jatoi	PS-18	Nausheroferoze
19	Tariq Khan Jatoi	PS-19	Nausheroferoze
20	Syed Shoukat Hussain Shah	PS-20	Nawab Shah
21	Jan Mohammad Brohi	PS-21	Nawab Shah
22	Bahadur Khan Dahri	PS-22	Nawab Shah
23	Ghulam Rasool Unar	PS-23	Nawab Shah
24	Syed Qaim Ali Shah	PS-24	Khairpur
25	Pir Syed Sadaruddin Shah	PS-25	Khairpur
26	Pir Syed Haji Gul Shah	PS-26	Khairpur
27	Syed Pervez Ali Shah	PS-27	Khairpur
28	Sajid Ali Banbhan	PS-28	Khairpur
29	Mir Nadir Ali Khan Magsi	PS-29	Larkana
30	Mumtaz Ali Khan Bhutto	PS-30	Larkana
31	Mir Murtaza Bhutto	PS-31	Larkana
32	Ghulam Mujtaba Khan Isran	PS-32	Larkana
33	Nisar Ahmed Khuhro	PS-33	Larkana
34	Nazir Ahmed Khan Bughio	PS-34	Larkana
35	Makhdoom Rafique-uz-Zaman (ByElection, Un-Contested)	PS-35	Hyderabad
36	Pir Syed Noor Shah	PS-36	Hyderabad
37	Pir Syed Amjad Hussain Shah	PS-37	Hyderabad
38	Salahuddin	PS-38	Hyderabad
39	Mohammad Mubin	PS-39	Hyderabad
40	Mohammad Maqbool Ahmed	PS-40	Hyderabad
41	Zafar Ali Rajput	PS-41	Hyderabad
42	Syed Umed Ali Shah	PS-42	Hyderabad
43	Abdul Latif Mangrio	PS-43	Hyderabad
44	Syed Mohsin Shah Bukhari	PS-44	Hyderabad
45	Mohammad Amin Lakho	PS-45	Hyderabad
46	Haji Abdul Gafoor Nizamani	PS-46	Badin
47	Mir Allah Bux Talpur	PS-47	Badin
48	Pir Ali Bahadur Shah	PS-48	Badin
49	Sikandar Ali Mandhro	PS-49	Badin
50	Fareed Ahmed	PS-50	Mirpurkhas
51	Syed Inayat Ali Shah	PS-51	Mirpurkhas
52	Mir Munwar Ali Talpur	PS-52	Umerkot
53	Syed Ali Mardan Shah	PS-53	Umerkot
54	Mir Haji Mohammad Hayat Khan Talpur	PS-54	Mirpurkhas
55	Arbab Attaullah	PS-55	Thar
56	Inayatullah Rahmoon	PS-56	Thar
57	Haji Ghulam Mohammad Lot Memon	PS-57	Thar
58	Haji Mohammad Siddique Shoro	PS-58	Dadu
59	Syed Abdullah Shah	PS-59	Dadu
60	Pir Mazhar-ul-Haq	PS-60	Dadu
61	Pir Syed Ghulam Shah Jillani	PS-61	Dadu
62	Haji Zafar Ali Leghari	PS-62	Dadu
63	Munwar Ali Butt	PS-63	Dadu
64	Muzaffar Hussain Shah	PS-64	Sanghar
65	Pir Syed Sibghatullah Shah Rashdi	PS-65	Sanghar
66	Jam Madad Ali	PS-66	Sanghar
66.A	Jam Karam Ali Khan (By-Election)	PS-66	Sanghar
67	Rasool Bux Marri	PS-67	Sanghar
68	Abdul Salam Thaheem	PS-68	Sanghar
69	Abdul Wahid Soomro	PS-69	Thatta
70	Ghulam Qadir Paleejo	PS-70	Thatta
71	Syed Aijaz Ali Shah Sheerazi	PS-71	Thatta
72	Mohammad Ali Malkani	PS-72	Thatta
73	Lal Bux Bhutto	PS-73	Karachi
74	Abdul Qadir Lakhani	PS-74	Karachi
75	Mohammad Kamran Jaffery	PS-75	Karachi
76	S.M. Mohiuddin	PS-76	Karachi
77	Shamim Ahmed Advocate	PS-77	Karachi
78	Afzal Anwar	PS-78	Karachi
79	Feroza Begum	PS-79	Karachi
80	Syed Shoaib Ahmed Bukhari	PS-80	Karachi
81	Babar Khan Ghouri	PS-81	Karachi
82	Wakeel Ahmed Jamali	PS-82	Karachi
83	Qamar Mansoor	PS-83	Karachi
84	Khalilullah	PS-84	Karachi
85	Abdul Khaliq Jumma	PS-85	Karachi
86	Abdul Qadir Patel (By-Election)	PS-86	Karachi
87	Mohammad Farooq Sattar	PS-87	Karachi
88	Nabeel Ahmed Gabol	PS-88	Karachi
89	Capt. Syed Mohammad Ali	PS-89	Karachi
90	Rana Safdar Ali Khan Advocate	PS-90	Karachi
91	Dr. Sagheer Ahmed	PS-91	Karachi
92	Mohammad Arif Siddiqui	PS-92	Karachi
93	Waseem Akhtar	PS-93	Karachi
94	Mohammad Hussain	PS-94	Karachi
95	Mohammad Haroon Siddiqui	PS-95	Karachi
96	Qazi Khalid Ali Advocate	PS-96	Karachi
97	Khuwaja Mohammad	PS-97	Karachi
98	Abdul Hakeem Baloch	PS-98	Karachi
99	Mohammad Farrukh Naeem Siddiqui	PS-99	Karachi
100	Syed Zulfiqar Haider	PS-100	Karachi
Reserved Seat for Chirtians
101	Saleem Khursheed Khokhar		
102	Michael Javaid		
Reserved Seat for Hindu and Scheduled casts
103	Hari Ram S/O Kishorilal		
104	Engineer Gian		
105	Engineer Gian		
106	Hamir		
107	Lachman Das		
107.A	Washder Sewani alias Pitamber		
Reserved Seat for Sikh, Buddhist, Parsi and other non-Muslims
108	Dinshaw H. Anklesaria		
Reserved Seat for Person belonging to Quadiani
109	Atta Mohammad		
