= Sadiq Ali Memon =

Pakistani politician

- صادق علي ميمڻ

Member of the National Assembly of Pakistan
- Incumbent
- Assumed office 29 February 2024
- Constituency: NA-225 Thatta

Special Assistant to Chief Minister Sindh for DEPD
- In office August 2021 – August 2023
- Governor: Imran Ismail; Kamran Tessori
- Chief Minister of Sindh: Murad Ali Shah

Member of the Provincial Assembly of Sindh
- In office 2010 – 30 November 2012
- Constituency: PS-84 Thatta-I

Personal details
- Party: PPP (2010-present)
- Parent: Shams un Nisa (mother)

Sadiq Ali Memon (Sindhi:صادق علي ميمڻ; Urdu: صادق علی میمن) is a Pakistani politician from Thatta who has been a member of the National Assembly of Pakistan since February 2024. He was also a member of the Provincial Assembly of Sindh from 2010 to 2012 and a Minister from 2011 to 2012. He was elected to the National Assembly seat in 2013 general elections from NA-237 (NA-232 now) but was disqualified for being a dual national. He served as a Special Assistant to the Chief Minister of Sindh for Department of Empowerment of Persons with Disabilities (DEPD) from August 2021 to August 2023.

He is a graduate of the Oklahoma State University.

== Political career ==
He was elected to the Provincial Assembly of Sindh as a candidate of Pakistan People's Party (PPP) from PS-86 in a 2010 by-election. He resigned from the Assembly on 30 November 2012.

He was elected to the National Assembly of Pakistan as a candidate of PPP from NA-237 (Thatta-I) in the 2013 Pakistani general election. He was unseated as he was disqualified to continue in office because of his Canadian nationality.

He was re-elected to the National Assembly as a candidate of PPP from NA-225 Thatta in the 2024 Pakistani general election. He received 140,773 votes and defeated Rasool Bux Jakhro a candidate of Pakistan Muslim League (N) (PML(N)).
