= Asad Sikandar =

Pakistani politician

Sardar Malik Asad Sikandar
- سردار ملڪ اسد سڪندر

Member of the National Assembly of Pakistan
- Incumbent
- Assumed office 29 February 2024
- Constituency: NA-226 Jamshoro
- In office 1 June 2013 – 31 May 2018
- Constituency: NA-231 (Jamshoro)
- In office 15 October 1993 – 6 February 1997
- Constituency: NA-177 (Dadu)

Member of the Provincial Assembly of Sindh
- In office 13 August 2018 – 11 August 2023
- Constituency: PS-82 Jamshoro-III
- In office 20 February 1997 – 12 October 1999
- Constituency: PS-58 Dadu
- In office 28 February 1985 – 30 May 1988
- Constituency: PS-60 Dadu

Personal details
- Born: 1 January 1949 (age 77)
- Party: PPP (2013-present)
- Relations: Malik Sikandar Khan (Son); Malik Sikandar Khan Hamlani (Father)

Sardar Malik Asad Sikandar (Sindhi: سردار ملڪ اسد سڪندر;Urdu: سردار ملک اسد سکندر; born 1 January 1949) is a Pakistani politician who has been a member of the National Assembly of Pakistan since February 2024 and previously served in this position from June 2013 to May 2018 and from 17 October 1993 to 6 February 1997. He had been a member of the Provincial Assembly of Sindh from 28 February 1985 till 30 May 1988,20 February 1997 till 12 October 1999 and August 2018 till August 2023.

== Early life ==
He was born on 1 January 1969.

Sardar Malik Asad Sikandar is chief of the Burfat tribe.

== Political career ==
He served as district nazim Jamshoro.

He was elected to the Provincial Assembly of Sindh as a candidate of PPP from Constituency PS-60 Dadu in the 1985 Sindh provincial election.

He was elected to the National Assembly of Pakistan as a candidate of Pakistan Peoples Party (PPP) from Constituency NA-177 (Dadu) in the 1993 Pakistani general election.

He was re-elected to the Provincial Assembly of Sindh as a candidate of PPP from Constituency PS-58 Dadu in the 1997 Sindh provincial election.

He was re-elected to the National Assembly of Pakistan as a candidate of Pakistan Peoples Party (PPP) from Constituency NA-231 (Jamshoro) in the 2013 Pakistani general election. He received 129,500 votes and defeated Syed Jalal Mehmood Shah.

He was re-elected to the Provincial Assembly of Sindh as a candidate of PPP from Constituency PS-82 (Jamshoro-III) in the 2018 Sindh provincial election.

He was re-elected to the National Assembly as a candidate of PPP from NA-226 Jamshoro in the 2024 Pakistani general election. He received 165,044 votes and defeated Syed Munir Haider Shah, a candidate of the Grand Democratic Alliance (GDA).
