= List of members of the 12th Provincial Assembly of Sindh =

Sindh assembly 2002 - 2007

Elections for the twelfth provincial assembly of Sindh were held on 10 October 2002, under the military regime of General Pervez Musharraf, after a martial law of three years.

== List of members of the 12th Provincial Assembly of Sindh ==
tenure of the twelfth assembly was from 10 October 2002 to 15 November 2007. This is a list of members of the 12th Provincial Assembly of Sindh, Pakistan.

#	Name	Constituency	District
1	Nasrullah Baloch	PS 1	Sukkur I
2	Anwar Ahmed Khan Mahar	PS 2	Sukkur II
3	Jam SaiFullah Khan Dharejo	PS 3	Sukkur III
4	Syed Javed Hussain Shah	PS 4	Sukkur IV
5	Jam Mehtab Hussain Dahar	PS 5	Ghotki I
6	Sardar Ali Muhammad Khan Mahar	PS 6	Ghotki II
7	Sardar Nadir Akmal Khan Leghari	PS 7	Ghotki III
8	Abdul Razzaque Khan Mahar	PS 8	Ghotki IV
9	Zulfiqar Ali Kamario	PS 9	Shikarpur I
10	Faiz Muhammad Mahar	PS 10	Shikarpur II
11	Tamoor Khan	PS 11	Shikarpur III
12	Abid Hussain Jatoi	PS 12	Shikarpur IV
13	Manzoor Ali Khan Panwhar	PS 13	Jacobabad I
14	Naseer Khan Khoso	PS 14	Jacobabad II
15	Sohrab Khan Sarki	PS 15	Jacobabad III
16	Mehboob Ali Khan Bijrani	PS 16	Jacobabad IV
17	Ghulam Abid Khan Sundrani	PS 17	Jacobabad V
18	Imtiaz Ahmed Alias Tariq Shaikh	PS 18	Jacobabad VI
19	Arif Mustafa Jatoi	PS 19	Nausheroferoze I
20	Murad Ali Shah	PS 20	Nausheroferoze II
21	Syed Manzoor Hussain Shah (alias Ghulam Hussain Shah)	PS 21	Nausheroferoze III
22	Noor Muhammad Shah	PS 22	Nausheroferoze IV
23	Farhad Zaman Jatoi	PS 23	Nausheroferoze V
24	Tariq Masood Arain	PS 24	Nawabshah I
25	Ahmed Ali Khan Jalbani	PS 25	Nawabshah II
26	Ali Ahmed Shah	PS 26	Nawabshah III
27	Ghulam Qadir Chandio	PS 27	Nawabshah IV
28	Jam Tamachi	PS 28	Nawabshah V
29	Qaim Ali Shah	PS 29	Khairpur I
30	Sadaruddin Shah Alias Younis Sain	PS 30	Khairpur II
31	Bashir Ahmed	PS 31	Khairpur III
32	Mohammed Rafiq Ahmed Banbhan	PS 31	Khairpur III
33	Nawab Ali Wassan	PS 32	Khairpur IV
34	Zahid Ali Banbhan	PS 33	Khairpur V
35	Naeem Ahmed Kharal	PS 34	Khairpur VI
36	Altaf Hussain Unar	PS 35	Larkana I
37	Nisar Ahmed Khuhro	PS 36	Larkana II
38	Muhammad Ayaz Soomro	PS 37	Larkana III
39	Munawar Ali Abbasi	PS 38	Larkana IV
40	Ghulam Mujadid Isran	PS 39	Larkana V
41	Sultan Ahmed Khuhwar	PS 40	Larkana VI
42	Aziz Ahmed Jatoi	PS 41	Larkana VII
43	Najamuddin Abro	PS 42	Larkana VIII
44	Jamil-Uz-Zaman	PS 43	Hyderabad I
45	Jalal Shah Jamote	PS 44	Hyderabad II
46	Abdul Rahman Rajput.	PS 45	Hyderabad III
47	Arshad Shah	PS 46	Hyderabad IV
48	Zahid Ali Bhurgri	PS 47	Hyderabad V
49	Muhammad Naeem Ishtiaque	PS 48	Hyderabad VI
50	Aslam Pervez Khan Advocate	PS 49	Hyderabad VII
51	Amjad Hussain Shah Jilani.	PS 50	Hyderabad VIII
52	Ali Nawaz Shah Rizvi	PS 51	Hyderabad IX
53	Irfan Gul Magsi.	PS 52	Hyderabad X
54	Ali Nawaz Talpur	PS 53	Hyderabad XI
55	Abdul Qadir Soomro	PS 54	Hyderabad XII
56	Muhammad Hassan Khan Talpur	PS 55	Badin I
57	Amjad Ali Siddiqui	PS 56	Badin II
58	Ali Buz Shah	PS 57	Badin III
59	Sikandar Ali Mandhro	PS 58	Badin IV
60	Muhammad Nawaz Chandiro	PS 59	Badin V
61	Arbab Ghulam Rahim	PS 60	Tharparkar I
62	Rajvir Singh Sodha	PS 61	Tharparkar II
63	Arbab Haji Abdullah	PS 62	Tharparkar III
64	Abdul Razzak Rahimoon	PS 63	Tharparkar IV
65	Shabbir Ahmed Qaim Khani.	PS 64	Mirpurkhas I
66	Irfan Ali Shah	PS 65	Mirpurkhas II
67	Zulfiqar Ali Talpur	PS 66	Mirpurkhas III
68	Mehboob Ali Talpur	PS 67	Mirpurkhas IV
69	Dost Muhammad Memon	PS 68	Mirpurkhas V
70	Muzaffar Hussain Shah	PS 69	Mirpurkhas VI
71	Ali Mardan Shah	PS 70	Mirpurkhas VII
72	Pir Mujeeb-Ur-Rehman Shah Jillani	PS 71	Dadu I
73	Asif Ali Shah	PS 72	Dadu II
74	Murad Ali Shah	PS 73	Dadu III
75	Marvi Mazhar	PS 74	Dadu IV
76	Sajeela Leghari	PS 75	Dadu V
77	Ahsan Ali Jatoi	PS 76	Dadu VI
78	Sadaqat Ali Jatoi	PS 77	Dadu VII
79	Iftikhar Ahmed	PS 78	Sanghar I
80	Pir Buz Junejo	PS 79	Sanghar II
81	Shams Din Rajar	PS 80	Sanghar III
82	Madad Ali Khan	PS 81	Sanghar IV
83	Imamuddin Shoukeen	PS 82	Sanghar V
84	Mahi Khan Wassan	PS 83	Sanghar VI
85	Manzoor Hussain Shah Shirazi	PS 84	Thatta I
86	Sassui Palijo	PS 85	Thatta II
87	Sarfraz Shah Sherazi	PS 86	Thatta III
88	Muhammad Usman Khan	PS 87	Thatta IV
89	Karim Dino Shah Sherazi	PS 88	Thatta V
90	Akhtar Hussain Jadoon	PS 89	Karachi I
91	Umar Sadiq	PS 90	Karachi II
92	Hafiz Muhammad Naeem	PS 91	Karachi III
93	Abdul Sattar Ansari	PS 92	Karachi IV
94	Hameedullah	PS 93	Karachi V
95	Abdul Qudoos	PS 94	Karachi VI
96	Anwar Alam	PS 95	Karachi VII
97	S.A. Iqbal Qadri	PS 96	Karachi VIII
98	Muhammad Hussain Khan	PS 97	Karachi IX
99	Syed Sardar Ahmed	PS 98	Karachi X
100	Qamar Mansoor	PS 99	Karachi XI
101	Muhammad Adil Siddiqui	PS 100	Karachi XII
102	Bilqis Mukhtar	PS 101	Karachi XIII
103	Imamuddin	PS 102	Karachi XIV
104	Muhammad Idress Siddiqui	PS 103	Karachi XV
105	Muhammad Moin Khan	PS 104	Karachi XVI
106	Rehana Nasreen	PS 105	Karachi XVII
107	Khalid Bin Vilayat Advocate	PS 106	Karachi XVIII
108	Shoaib Ahmed Bukhari	PS 107	Karachi XIX
109	Muhammed Saleem Hingoro	PS 108	Karachi XX
110	Muhammad Rafiq Advocate	PS 109	Karachi XXI
111	Abdul Aziz Bantwa	PS 110	Karachi XXII
112	Tayyab Hussain Hashmi	PS 111	Karachi XXIII
113	Syed Shakir Ali	PS 112	Karachi XXIV
114	Akhtar Mehdi Bilgrami	PS 113	Karachi XXV
115	Irfanyllah Khan Marwat.	PS 114	Karachi XXVI
116	Muhammad Rauf Siddiqui	PS 115	Karachi XXVII
117	Nasrullah Khan	PS 116	Karachi XXVIII
118	Mustafa Kamal	PS 117	Karachi XXIX
119	Sagheer Ahmad	PS 117	Karachi XXIX
120	Faisal Ali Sabzwari	PS 118	Karachi XXX
121	Muhammad Abbas Jaferi	PS 119	Karachi XXXI
122	Nishat Muhammad Zia Qadri	PS 120	Karachi XXXII
123	Hamid-Uz-Zaffar	PS 121	Karachi XXXIII
124	Uhammad Younis Khan	PS 122	Karachi-XXXIV
125	Talib Imam	PS 124	Karachi XXXVI
126	Muhammad Moin Aamir Prizada	PS 125	Karachi XXXVII
127	Muhammad Younis Barai	PS 126	Karachi XXXVIII
128	Yousif Munir Shaikh	PS 127	Karachi XXXIX
129	Moulana Ahsanullah Ashraf Hazari	PS 128	Karachi XXXX
130	Mehmood Alam Jamot	PS 129	Karachi XXXXI
131	Muhammad Sajid Jokhio	PS 130	Karachi XXXXII
132	Ramesh Kumar	RSM - 1	
133	Ishwardas	RSM - 2	
134	Dayo (alias Dr. Dayaram Essarani)	RSM - 3	
135	Mukesh Kumar	RSM - 4	
136	Asardass Danoo Mal	RSM - 5	
137	Sankar Lal Talreja	RSM - 6	
138	Poonjo Bheel	RSM - 7	
139	Ishwar Lal	RSM - 8	
140	Yaqoob Ilyas	RSM - 9	
141	Bhagoomal Alias Bhagchand	RSM - 9	
142	Hamida Khuhro	RSW-1	
143	Saira Shahliani	RSW-10	
144	Nasreen Chandio	RSW-11	
145	Sharifunnisa	RSW-12	
146	Humera Alwani	RSW-13	
147	Syeda Bano Siddique	RSW-14	
148	Shamim Ara Panhwar	RSW-15	
149	Kalsoom Nizamani	RSW-16	
150	Sakina Bano	RSW-17	
151	Shumaila Nazar	RSW-18	
152	Heer Ismail Soho	RSW-19	
153	Saeeda Malik	RSW-2	
154	Farzana	RSW-20	
155	Asma Sherwani	RSW-21	
156	Farheen Ambreen	RSW-22	
157	Aziz Fatima	RSW-23	
158	Rani Ambreen Jan	RSW-24	
159	Rahila Tiwana	RSW-25	
160	Afshan Imran	RSW-26	
161	Begum Gulzar Unar	RSW-27	
162	Naila Inam	RSW-28	
163	Fareeda Bano	RSW-29	
164	Farida Baloch	RSW-3	
165	Nuzhat Pathan	RSW-4	
166	Mehreen Razzaque Bhutto	RSW-5	
167	Firdous Hameed (alias Farheen Mughal)	RSW-6	
168	Fariha Razzaq Haroon	RSW-7	
169	Shama Arif Mithani	RSW-8	
170	Shazia Atta Muhammad Marri	RSW-9	
