= Malik Sikandar Khan =

Malik Sikandar Khan may refer to:

- Malik Sikandar Khan (Balochistan politician)
- Malik Sikandar Khan (Sindh politician)
