= PS-79 Thatta-III =

Former constituency of the Provincial Assembly of Sindh, Pakistan

- Constituency for the Provincial Assembly of Sindh
- Region: Thatta Tehsil (partly) and Mirpur Sakro Tehsil (partly) of Thatta District

Current constituency
- Party: PPP
- Member: Jam Awais Bijar Khan Jokhio
- Created from: PS-85 Thatta-II (2002-2018)
- Replaced by: PS-75 Thatta-I and PS-76 Thatta-II

PS-79 Thatta-III (پی ایس-79، ٹهٹہ-3) was a constituency of the Provincial Assembly of Sindh. Thatta lost 1 seat after 2023 Delimitations.

== General elections 2013 ==
Contesting candidates	Party affiliation	Votes polled

== General elections 2008 ==
Contesting candidates	Party affiliation	Votes polled

== See also ==
- PS-78 Thatta-II
- PS-80 Jamshoro-I
