= Sohrab Khan Sarki =

Pakistani politician

- سهراب خان سرڪي

Member of the Provincial Assembly of Sindh
- Incumbent
- Assumed office February 24, 2024.
- Constituency: PS-2 Jacobabad-II
- In office 13 August 2018 – 11 August 2023
- Constituency: PS-2 Jacobabad-II
- In office 29 May 2013 – 28 May 2018
- Constituency: PS-15 (Jacobabad)
- In office 10 October 2002 – 15 November 2007
- Constituency: PS-15 (Jacobabad)
- In office 20 February 1997 – 12 October 1999
- Constituency: PS-12 (Jacobabad)
- In office 18 October 1993 – 7 November 1996
- Constituency: PS-12 (Jacobabad)

Personal details
- Born: 30 July 1968 (age 58) Jacobabad, Sindh, Pakistan
- Party: PPP (2013-present)
- Relations: Sardar Haji Wahid Bux Sarki(father)

Sohrab Khan Sarki (Sindhi: سهراب خان سرڪي;born 30 July 1968) is a Pakistani politician who is a member of the Provincial Assembly of Sindh from 2024. He previously had been a member of the Provincial Assembly of Sindh from August 2018 till August 2023 and May 2013 to May 2018.

== Early life and education ==
He was born on 30 July 1968 in Jacobabad.

He has a degree of Bachelor of Medicine and Bachelor of Surgery from Dow Medical College.

He is Son of Sardar Haji Wahid Bux Sarki Former member of Provincial Assembly of Sindh.

== Political career ==
He was elected to the Provincial Assembly of Sindh as an independent from Constituency PS-12 (Jacobabad-cum-Kashmore-I) in the 1993 Sindh provincial election.

He was re-elected to the Provincial Assembly of Sindh as a candidate of Pakistan Peoples Party (PPP) from Constituency PS-12 Jacobabad in the 1997 Sindh provincial election.

He was re-elected to Provincial Assembly of Sindh as a candidate of Pakistan Peoples Party (PPP) from Constituency PS-15 Jacobabad in the 2002 Sindh provincial election.

He was re-elected to the Provincial Assembly of Sindh as a candidate of Pakistan Peoples Party (PPP) from Constituency PS-15 (Jacobabad-cum-Kashmore-I) in the 2013 Sindh provincial election.

He was re-elected to Provincial Assembly of Sindh as a candidate of PPP from PS-2 (Jacobabad-II) in the 2018 Sindh provincial election.

He was again re-elected to Provincial Assembly of Sindh as a candidate of PPP from PS-2 (Jacobabad-II) in the 2024 Sindh provincial election.
