= PS-2 Jacobabad-II =

Constituency of the Provincial Assembly of Sindh, Pakistan

- Constituency for the Provincial Assembly of Sindh
- Region: Thul Tehsil (partly) of Jacobabad District
- Electorate: 181,116

Current constituency
- Member: Vacant
- Created from: PS-15 Jacobabad-III

PS-2 Jacobabad-II (پی ایس-2، جیکب آباد-2) is a constituency of the Provincial Assembly of Sindh.

== General elections 2024 ==
Provincial election 2024: PS-2 Jacobabad-II
Party	Candidate	Votes	%	±%
PPP	Sohrab Khan Sarki	52,630	49.77	
JUI (F)	Shafique Ahmed Khoso	48,896	46.24	
Others	Others (seventeen candidates)	4,229	3.99	
Turnout		110,043	60.76	
Total valid votes		105,755	96.10	
Rejected ballots		4,288	3.90	
Majority		3,734	3.53	
Registered electors		181,116		

== General elections 2018 ==
Contesting candidates	Party affiliation	Votes polled

== General elections 2013 ==
Contesting candidates	Party affiliation	Votes polled

== General elections 2008 ==
Contesting candidates	Party affiliation	Votes polled

== See also ==
- PS-1 Jacobabad-I
- PS-3 Jacobabad-III
