= Wahid Bux Sarki =

Sardar Haji Wahid Bux Sarki
- سردار حاجي واحد بخش سرڪي

Member of the Provincial Assembly of Sindh
- Constituency: PS-13 Jacobabad
- In office 28 February 1985 – 30 May 1988

Personal details
- Relations: Sohrab Khan Sarki (Son)

Sardar Haji Wahid Bux Sarki (Sindhi: سردار حاجي واحد بخش سرڪي) was a Pakistani politician from Jacobabad District who has been Member of Provincial Assembly of Sindh from 28 February 1985 till 30 May 1988 from PS-13. He is father of Sohrab Khan Sarki Member of Provincial Assembly of Sindh.
