= Syed Ayaz Ali Shah Sheerazi =

Pakistani politician

Member of the National Assembly of Pakistan
- Incumbent
- Assumed office 29 February 2024
- Constituency: NA-224 Sujawal
- In office 13 August 2018 – 10 August 2023
- Constituency: NA-231 (Sujawal)
- In office 2002 – 31 May 2018
- Constituency: NA-238 (Thatta-II)

Minister of State for National Food Security and Research
- In office 10 August 2017 – 31 May 2018
- President: Mamnoon Hussain
- Prime Minister: Shahid Khaqan Abbasi

Personal details
- Born: August 20, 1976 (age 49)
- Party: PPP (2002-present)

Syed Ayaz Ali Shah Sheerazi (Urdu: سید ایاز علی شاہ شیرازی; born 20 August 1976) is a Pakistani politician who has been a member of the National Assembly of Pakistan since February 2024 and previously served in this position from August 2018 till August 2023 and from 2002 to May 2018. He served as Minister of State for National Food Security and Research, in Abbasi cabinet from August 2017 to May 2018.

== Early life ==
He was born on 20 August 1976.

== Political career ==
He was elected to the National Assembly of Pakistan as a candidate of Pakistan Muslim League (Q) (PML-Q) from Constituency NA-237 (Thatta-I) in the 2002 Pakistani general election. He received 57,195 votes and defeated Abdul Wahid Soomro, a candidate of Pakistan Peoples Party (PPP). In the same election, he ran for the seat of the Provincial Assembly of Sindh as a candidate of PML-Q from Constituency PS-85 (Thatta-II) but was unsuccessful. He received 15,026 votes and lost the seat to Sassui Palijo.

He was re-elected to the National Assembly as a candidate of PML-Q from Constituency NA-238 (Thatta-II) in the 2008 Pakistani general election. He received 76,812 votes and defeated Arbab Wazir Ahmed Memon, a candidate of PPP. In the same election, he ran for the seat of the Provincial Assembly of Sindh as an independent candidate from Constituency PS-85 (Thatta-II) but was unsuccessful. He received 52 votes and lost the seat to Sassui Palijo.

He was re-elected to the National Assembly as an independent candidate from Constituency NA-238 (Thatta-II) in the 2013 Pakistani general election. He received 88,954 votes and defeated Rameez u din Memon, a candidate of PPP.

Following the election of Shahid Khaqan Abbasi as Prime Minister of Pakistan in August 2017, he was inducted into the cabinet of Abbasi as Minister of State for National Food Security and Research. Upon the dissolution of the National Assembly on the expiration of its term on 31 May 2018, Sheerazi ceased to hold the office as Minister of State for National Food Security and Research.

He was re-elected to the National Assembly as a candidate of PPP from NA-231 (Sujawal) in the 2018 Pakistani general election. He received 129,980 votes and defeated Maulvi Muhammad Saleh Alhadad, a candidate of Muttahida Majlis-e-Amal (MMA).

He was re-elected to the National Assembly as a candidate of PPP from NA-224 Sujawal in the 2024 Pakistani general election. He received 134,056 votes and defeated Maulvi Muhammad Saleh Alhadad, a candidate of Jamiat Ulema-e-Islam (F) (JUI(F)).
