= Shehla Raza =

Pakistani politician

Syeda Shehla Raza Zaidi

Provincial Minister of Sindh for Women Development
- In office 20 August 2018 – 11 August 2023
- Chief Minister: Murad Ali Shah

Deputy Speaker of the Provincial Assembly of Sindh
- In office 30 May 2013 – 28 May 2018
- Speaker: Agha Siraj Durrani
- Preceded by: Herself
- In office 7 April 2008 – 19 March 2013
- Speaker: Nisar Khuhro
- Succeeded by: Herself

Acting Governor of Sindh
- In office 9 November 2016 – 11 November 2016
- Preceded by: Ishratul Ibad
- Succeeded by: Saeeduzzaman Siddiqui

Member of the Provincial Assembjly of Sindh
- In office 13 August 2018 – 11 August 2023
- Constituency: Reserved seat for women
- In office 29 May 2013 – 28 May 2018
- Constituency: Reserved seat for women
- In office 5 April 2008 – 20 March 2013
- Constituency: Reserved seat for women

Member National Assembly of Pakistan
- Incumbent
- Assumed office March 2024

President Pakistan Hockey Federation
- Incumbent
- Assumed office March 2024

Personal details
- Born: 8 January 1964 (age 62) Karachi, Sindh, Pakistan
- Party: PPP (2008-present)
- Spouse: Ghulam Qadir
- Children: 2 (both deceased)
- Occupation: Politician

Syeda Shehla Raza Zaidi (Urdu: سیدہ شہلا رضا زیدی) (born 15 May 1964 in Karachi, Pakistan) is a Pakistan People's Party politician and Member of National Assembly of Pakistan from the Sindh province. In 2008, she was unanimously elected deputy speaker in the Thirteenth Assembly of the Sindh Assembly, and re-elected in 2013 for that position in the Fourteenth Assembly.

== Early education ==
Raza completed her undergraduate and graduate education at the University of Karachi, receiving her Master's degree in Physiology in 1991.

== Political career ==
Her political career began while she was attending university. In 1986, she joined the People's Students Federation, a student wing of the Pakistan People's Party, when political activities were banned. Her activism began during this period of military rule. Three years later, Raza was elected as the Joint Secretary of the People's Student Federation.

In 1990, after the right-wing conservative alliance, the Islamic Democratic Alliance (IDA), formed a government, she was arrested and incarcerated for almost a month for her political activities, based upon allegations of a double murder and possession of illegal arms. The charges were later dropped.

Politically she was a protege of Benazir Bhutto, who picked her for the party's "reserved women's seat" in the Sindh Assembly for the 2009 elections.

== Personal life ==
In 1991, she married Ghulam Qadir, a former politician and then a general manager for Shahzeb Pharmaceutical Company. Her first child, a daughter, was born in 1992; in 1994 she had a son. Both of them were killed in a traffic accident in 2005.
