= Malik Sikandar Khan Hamlani =

- ملڪ سڪندر خان هاملاني

Member of the National Assembly of Pakistan
- In office 1977–1977
- In office 1972–1977

Member of the Provincial Assembly of Sindh
- In office 12 September 1953 – 26th March 1955

Personal details
- Relations: Malik Asad Sikandar (Son) Malik Sikandar Khan (Grandson)

Malik Sikandar Khan Hamlani (Sindhi: ملڪ سڪندر خان هاملاني) is a Pakistani politician who was member of National Assembly of Pakistan twice and member of the Sindh Legislative Assembly Once.

== Politcial career ==
He was elected to Sindh Legislative Assembly on 12 September 1953 from Mahal Kohistan.

He was then elected to National Assembly of Pakistan as a PPP candidate from NW 125 Dadu in 1972 defeating Pir Syed Saleh Shah from PMLQ.

He was re-elected to National Assembly of Pakistan from NA-176 Dadu in 1977 Unopposed again as a PPP candidate.

He is father of Politician Malik Asad Sikandar.
