= List of members of the 9th Provincial Assembly of Sindh =

Provincial elections were held in Sindh, Pakistan along with general elections, for National Assembly and all Provincial Assemblies, on 29 October 1990.

== List of members of the 9th Provincial Assembly of Sindh ==
Tenure of the 9th provincial assembly of Sindh was from 4 November 1990 till 19 July 1993.

| Serial | Name | Constituency | District |
|---|---|---|---|
| 1 | Jam Mumtaz Hussain Dahar | PS-1 | Sukkur |
| 2 | Sardar Rahim Bux Khan Bozdar | PS-2 | Sukkur |
| 3 | Haji Ali Anwar Khan Mahar | PS-3 | Sukkur |
| 4 | Sardar Haji Khan Chachar | PS-4 | Sukkur |
| 5 | Taj Muhammad Shaikh | PS-5 | Sukkur |
| 6 | Abdul Haleem Pirzada | PS-6 | Sukkur |
| 7 | Agha Siraj Khan Durrani | PS-7 | Shikarpur |
| 8 | Agha Tariq Khan | PS-8 | Shikarpur |
| 9 | Muhammad Ibrahim Khan Jatoi | PS-9 | Shikarpur |
| 10 | Sardar Saleem Jan Khan Mazari | PS-10 | Jacobabad |
| 11 | Sardar Sher Muhammad Khan Bijarani | PS-11 | Jacobabad |
| 12 | Mir Hassan Khan Khoso | PS-12 | Jacobabad |
| 13 | Mir Manzoor Ali Panhwar | PS-13 | Jacobabad |
| 14 | Sardar Agha Ghulam Ali Bulledi | PS-14 | Jacobabad |
| 15 | Pir Tariq Qurban | PS-15 | Nawab Shah |
| 16 | Syed Asghar Ali Shah | PS-16 | Nawab Shah |
| 17 | Syed Aftab Ali Shah | PS-17 | Nawab Shah |
| 18 | Ghulam Rasool Khan Jatoi | PS-18 | Nawab Shah |
| 19 | Masroor Ahmed Khan Jatoi | PS-19 | Nawab Shah |
| 20 | Abdul Majeed (resigned) | PS-20 | Nawab Shah |
| 20.A | Inayat Ali Rind (by- election) | PS-20 | Nawab Shah |
| 21 | Haji Ahmed Ali Khan Jalbani | PS-21 | Nawab Shah |
| 22 | Khan Muhammad Dahri | PS-22 | Nawab Shah |
| 23 | Syed Bashir Ahmed Shah | PS-23 | Nawab Shah |
| 24 | Syed Qaim Ali Shah | PS-24 | Khairpur |
| 25 | Pir Syed Sibghatullah Shah Rashdi | PS-25 | Khairpur |
| 26 | Pir Syed Haji Gul Shah | PS-26 | Khairpur |
| 27 | Manzoor Hussain Wassan | PS-27 | Khairpur |
| 28 | Bashir Ahmed Banbhan | PS-28 | Khairpur |
| 29 | Mir Nadir Ali Khan Magsi | PS-29 | Larkana |
| 30 | Syed Deedar Hussain Shah | PS-30 | Larkana |
| 31 | Haji Munawar Ali khan Abbasi | PS-31 | Larkana |
| 32 | Ghulam Mujtaba Khan Isran | PS-32 | Larkana |
| 33 | Nisar Ahmed Khuhro | PS-33 | Larkana |
| 34 | Haji Ghulam Hussain Unar | PS-34 | Larkana |
| 35 | Makhdoom Rafiq-uz-Zaman | PS-35 | Hyderabad |
| 36 | Pir Syed Noor Shah | PS-36 | Hyderabad |
| 37 | Pir Amjad Hussain Shah | PS-37 | Hyderabad |
| 38 | Ameenuddin (resigned) | PS-38 | Hyderabad |
| 38.A | Muhammad Azeem Palari (by- election) | PS-38 | Hyderabad |
| 39 | Rashid Ahmed Khan (resigned) | PS-39 | Hyderabad |
| 39.A | Muhammad Sagheer (by- election) | PS-39 | Hyderabad |
| 40 | Tariq Jawaid (resigned) | PS-40 | Hyderabad |
| 40.A | Nawab Rashid Ali Khan (by- election) | PS-40 | Hyderabad |
| 41 | Syed Sohail Mehmood Mashadi (resigned) | PS-41 | Hyderabad |
| 41.A | Yousuf Ali Bhatti (by- election) | PS-41 | Hyderabad |
| 42 | Abdul Ghani Dars | PS-42 | Hyderabad |
| 43 | Abdul Sattar Leghari | PS-43 | Hyderabad |
| 44 | Syed Mohsin Shah Bukhari. | PS-44 | Hyderabad |
| 45 | Syed Qabool Muhammad Shah | PS-45 | Hyderabad |
| 46 | Haji Abdul Ghafoor Nizamani | PS-46 | Dadin |
| 47 | Bashir Hussain Leghari (late) | PS-47 | Dadin |
| 47.A | Pir Sadaruddin Shah Rashdi (by- election) | PS-47 | Dadin |
| 48 | Pir Ali Bahadur Shah | PS-48 | Dadin |
| 49 | Muhammad Ismail Rahoo | PS-49 | Dadin |
| 50 | Fakir Muhammad (resigned) | PS-50 | Tharparkar |
| 50.A | Abdul Ghaffar Qureshi (by- election) | PS-50 | Tharparkar |
| 51 | Syed Ali Nawaz Shah | PS-51 | Tharparkar |
| 52 | Mir Munawar Ali Khan Talpur | PS-52 | Tharparkar |
| 53 | Syed Muzaffar Hussain Shah | PS-53 | Tharparkar |
| 54 | Mir Haji Muhammad Hayat Khan Talpur | PS-54 | Tharparkar |
| 55 | Arbab Faiz Muhammad | PS-55 | Tharparkar |
| 56 | Pir Noor Muhammad Shah Jillani | PS-56 | Tharparkar |
| 57 | Gul Muhammad Memon | PS-57 | Tharparkar |
| 58 | Haji Muhammad Siddique Shoro | PS-58 | Dadu |
| 59 | Syed Amir Hyder Shah | PS-59 | Dadu |
| 60 | Pir Mazharul Haq | PS-60 | Dadu |
| 61 | Syed Ghulam Shah Jillani | PS-61 | Dadu |
| 62 | Haji Amir Bux Junejo | PS-62 | Dadu |
| 63 | Liaquat Ali Khan Jatoi | PS-63 | Dadu |
| 64 | Haji Khuda Bux Nizammani (by- election) | PS-64 | Sanghar |
| 65 | Qazi Faiz Muhammad Rajar | PS-65 | Sanghar |
| 66 | Atta Muhammad Khan Marri | PS-66 | Sanghar |
| 67 | Jam Sadiq Ali (died on 05-03-1992) | PS-67 | Sanghar |
| 67.A | Jam Ashique Ali | PS-67 | Sanghar |
| 68 | Mir Muhammad Wassan | PS-68 | Sanghar |
| 69 | Syed Aijaz Ali Shah Sherazi | PS-69 | Thatta |
| 70 | Sahab Dino Khan Gaho | PS-70 | Thatta |
| 71 | Syed Shafique Ahmed Shah | PS-71 | Thatta |
| 72 | Ghulam Qadir Malkani | PS-72 | Thatta |
| 73 | Lal Bux Bhutto | PS-73 | Karachi |
| 74 | Syed Shahid Mian | PS-74 | Karachi |
| 75 | Abdul Salam Shaikh | PS-75 | Karachi |
| 76 | Abdul Razique Khan | PS-76 | Karachi |
| 77 | Syed Shoaib Ahmed Bukhari (resigned) | PS-77 | Karachi |
| 77.A | Shahidullah (by election) | PS-77 | Karachi |
| 78 | Hafiz Usama Qadri (resigned) | PS-78 | Karachi |
| 78.A | Asif Ali Khan (by election) | PS-78 | Karachi |
| 79 | Muhammad Abid Shareef | PS-79 | Karachi |
| 80 | Ahmed Saleem Siddiqui | PS-80 | Karachi |
| 81 | Ishrat-ul-Ibad Khan (resigned) | PS-81 | Karachi |
| 81.A | Dost Muhammad Faizi (by election) | PS-81 | Karachi |
| 82 | Badar Iqbal (resigned) | PS-82 | Karachi |
| 82.A | Syed Hashim Ali (by election) | PS-82 | Karachi |
| 83 | Syed Safdar Ali Bakri (resigned) | PS-83 | Karachi |
| 83.A | Shahabuddin (by election). | PS-83 | Karachi |
| 84 | Izhar Ahmed Khan (resigned) | PS-84 | Karachi |
| 84.A | Muhammad Shafi Ahmed Khan (by election) | PS-84 | Karachi |
| 85 | Abdul Khalique Jumma | PS-85 | Karachi |
| 86 | Ali Muhammad Hingoro | PS-86 | Karachi |
| 87 | Muhammad Irshad | PS-87 | Karachi |
| 88 | Al-haj Muhammad Hanif Soldier | PS-88 | Karachi |
| 89 | Muhammad Afzal Munif (resigned) | PS-89 | Karachi |
| 89.A | Noor Muhammad (by election) | PS-89 | Karachi |
| 90 | Mirza Shahif Baig (resigned) | PS-90 | Karachi |
| 90.A | Irfanullah Khan Marwat (by election) | PS-90 | Karachi |
| 91 | Muhammad Abdul Jalil (resigned) | PS-91 | Karachi |
| 91.A | Abdullah Sachwani (by election) | PS-91 | Karachi |
| 92 | Saleem Ahmed Khan (resigned) | PS-92 | Karachi |
| 92.A | Mansoor Ahmed (by election) | PS-92 | Karachi |
| 93 | Abid Akhtar (resigned) | PS-93 | Karachi |
| 93.A | Hamiza Ali Qureshi (by election) | PS-93 | Karachi |
| 94 | Muhammad Naeem Akhtar | PS-94 | Karachi |
| 94.A | Muhammad Hussain (by election) (resigned) | PS-94 | Karachi |
| 94.B | Muhammad Naeem Akhtar (by election) | PS-94 | Karachi |
| 95 | Muhammad Iqbal Qureshi | PS-95 | Karachi |
| 95.A | Muhammad Arif Khan (by election) (resigned) | PS-95 | Karachi |
| 95.B | Muhammad Iqbal Qureshi (by election) | PS-95 | Karachi |
| 96 | Muhammad Younus Khan | PS-96 | Karachi |
| 96.A | Shafiq-ur-Rahaman (by election) | PS-96 | Karachi |
| 97 | Khwaja Muhammad Awan | PS-97 | Karachi |
| 98 | Abdul Hakeem Baloch | PS-98 | Karachi |
| 99 | Aijaz Ahmed Khan (resigned) | PS-99 | Karachi |
| 99.A | Syed Asif Hafeez (by election) | PS-99 | Karachi |
| 100 | Muhammad Saleem | PS-100 | Karachi |
Reserved Seats for Minorities
| Serial | Name | Constituency | Religion |
| 101 | Hoshang Homi Broacha | Reserved Seat for Minority | Other |
| 102 | Michael Javed | Reserved Seat for Minority | Christian |
| 103 | Saleem Khursheed Khokhar | Reserved Seat for Minority | Christian |
| 104 | Shahjahan | Reserved Seat for Minority | Quadiani |
| 105 | Lachmandas Parwani | Reserved Seat for Minority | Hindu |
| 106 | Hameer Singh | Reserved Seat for Minority | Hindu |
| 107 | Mehro Mal Jagwani | Reserved Seat for Minority | Hindu |
| 108 | Hari Ram S/O Kishori Lal | Reserved Seat for Minority | Hindu |
| 109 | Mukhi Sarwanand | Reserved Seat for Minority | Hindu |
