= Abdul Wahid Soomro =

Pakistani politician

Member of the National Assembly of Pakistan
- In office 2008–2013
- Constituency: NA-237 (Thatta-I)

Abdul Wahid Soomro is a Pakistani politician who was a member of the National Assembly of Pakistan from 2008 to 2013.

== Political career ==
He ran for the seat of the National Assembly of Pakistan from Constituency NA-237 (Thatta-I) as a candidate of Pakistan Peoples Party (PPP) in the 2002 Pakistani general election but was unsuccessful. He received 53,616 votes and lost the seat to Syed Ayaz Ali Shah Sheerazi.

He was elected to the National Assembly from Constituency NA-237 (Thatta-I) as a candidate of PPP in the 2008 Pakistani general election. He received 85,138 votes and defeated Syed Riaz Hussain Shah Sheerazi, a candidate of Pakistan Muslim League (Q) (PML-Q).

He ran for the seat of the National Assembly from Constituency NA-237 (Thatta-I) as a candidate of PPP in the 2013 Pakistani general election but was unsuccessful. He received 78 votes and lost the seat to Shamasunnisa.
