= Riaz Hussain Shah Sheerazi =

Pakistani politician

Member of the Provincial Assembly of Sindh
- In office 13 August 2018 – 11 August 2023
- Constituency: PS-77 Thatta-I

Personal details
- Party: PPP (2018-present)

Riaz Hussain Shah Sheerazi is a Pakistani politician who had been a member of the Provincial Assembly of Sindh from August 2018 till August 2023.

== Political career ==
He was elected to the Provincial Assembly of Sindh as a candidate of Pakistan Peoples Party from Constituency PS-77 (Thatta-I) in the 2018 Pakistani general election.
