= Abdul Ghani Talpur =

Pakistani politician

Member of the National Assembly of Pakistan
- In office 2002–2013
- Constituency: NA-231 (Jamshoro)

Nawab Abdul Ghani Talpur is a Pakistani politician who was a member of the National Assembly of Pakistan from 2002 to 2013.

== Political career ==
He was elected to the National Assembly of Pakistan from Constituency NA-231 (Dadu-I) as a candidate of Pakistan Peoples Party (PPP) in the 2002 Pakistani general election. He received 76,568 votes and defeated Syed Jalal Mehmood Shah.

He was re-elected to the National Assembly from Constituency NA-231 (Jamshoro) as a candidate of PPP in the 2008 Pakistani general election. He received 138,320 votes and again defeated Syed Jalal Mehmood Shah.
