= NA-224 Sujawal =

Constituency of the National Assembly of Pakistan

- Constituency for the National Assembly of Pakistan
- Region: Sujawal District
- Electorate: 348,864

Current constituency
- Party: Pakistan People's Party
- Member(s): Syed Ayaz Ali Shah Sheerazi
- Created from: NA-238 Thatta-II

NA-224 Sujawal (این اے-224، سُجاول) is a constituency for the National Assembly of Pakistan.

== Assembly Segments ==
Constituency number	Constituency	District	Current MPA	Party
73	PS-73 Sujawal-I	Sujawal District	Shah Hussain Shah Sheerazi	PPP
74	PS-74 Sujawal-II	Sujawal District	Muhammad Ali Malkani	PPP

== Members of Parliament ==
=== 2018–2022: NA-231 Sujawal ===
Election	Member	Party
2018	Syed Ayaz Ali Shah Sheerazi	PPPP

=== 2024–present: NA-224 Sujawal ===
Election	Member	Party
2024	Syed Ayaz Ali Shah Sheerazi	PPPP

== Election 2002 ==
General elections were held on 10 October 2002. Muhammad Ali Malkani of PML-Q won by 70,233 votes.

General election 2002: NA-238 Thatta-II
Party	Candidate	Votes	%	±%
PML(Q)	Muhammad Ali Malkani	70,233	60.35	
PPP	Arbab Wazir Ahmed Memon	40,722	34.99	
MMA	Abdul Ghafoor Qasimi	4,699	4.04	
Others	Others (two candidates)	715	0.62	
Turnout		119,139	41.53	
Total valid votes		116,369	97.68	
Rejected ballots		2,770	2.32	
Majority		29,511	25.36	
Registered electors		286,897		

== Election 2008 ==
General elections were held on 18 February 2008. Syed Ayaz Ali Shah Sheerazi of PML-Q won by 76,812 votes.

General election 2008: NA-238 Thatta-II
Party	Candidate	Votes	%	±%
PML(Q)	Syed Ayaz Ali Shah Sheerazi	76,812	54.68	
PPP	Arbab Wazir Ahmed Memon	62,175	44.26	
Others	Others (two candidates)	1,477	1.06	
Turnout		144,849	39.68	
Total valid votes		140,464	96.97	
Rejected ballots		4,385	3.03	
Majority		14,637	10.42	
Registered electors		365,014		
PML(Q) hold				

== Election 2013 ==
General elections were held on 11 May 2013. Syed Ayaz Ali Shah Sheerazi, an independent candidate, won by 88,954 votes and became the member of National Assembly.

General election 2013: NA-238 Thatta-II
Party	Candidate	Votes	%	±%
Independent	Syed Ayaz Ali Shah Sheerazi	88,954	49.79	
PPP	Rameezul-Din Memon	79,181	44.32	
Others	Others (nine candidates)	10,536	5.89	
Turnout		187,614	61.37	
Total valid votes		178,671	95.23	
Rejected ballots		8,943	4.77	
Majority		9,773	5.47	
Registered electors		305,732		
Independent gain from PML(Q)				

== Election 2018 ==
General elections were held on 25 July 2018.

General election 2018: NA-231 Sujawal
Party	Candidate	Votes	%	±%
PPP	Syed Ayaz Ali Shah Sheerazi	129,980	85.05	
MMA	Maulvi Muhammad Saleh Alhadad	11,177	7.32	
Others	Others (six candidates)	11,667	7.63	
Turnout		160,109	45.89	
Total valid votes		152,824	95.45	
Rejected ballots		7,285	4.55	
Majority		118,803	77.73	
Registered electors		348,864		
PPP gain from Independent				

== Election 2024 ==
Elections were held on 8 February 2024. Syed Ayaz Ali Shah Sheerazi won the election with 134,056 votes.

General election 2024: NA-224 Sujawal
Party	Candidate	Votes	%	±%
PPP	Syed Ayaz Ali Shah Sheerazi	134,056	72.05	▼13.00
JUI (F)	Molvi Muhammad Saleh Alhadad	15,314	8.23	
PTI	Mumtaz Ali Shah (Note: Filed nomination papers as PTI candidate but ECP allowed him to run as an Independent)	10,949	5.89	
Others	Others (six candidates)	25,730	13.83	
Turnout		199,181	46.94	▲1.05
Total valid votes		186,049	93.41	
Rejected ballots		13,132	6.59	
Majority		118,742	63.82	▼13.91
Registered electors		424,333		
PPP hold				

== See also ==
- NA-223 Badin-II
- NA-225 Thatta
