= PS-78 Jamshoro-II =

Constituency of the Provincial Assembly of Sindh, Pakistan

- Constituency for the Provincial Assembly of Sindh
- Region: Manjhand Tehsil (partly) and Kotri Tehsil (partly) including Kotri city of Jamshoro District
- Electorate: 158,254

Current constituency
- Member: Vacant
- Created from: PS-71 Dadu-I (2002-2018); PS-82 Jamshoro-III (2018-2023)

PS-78 Jamshoro-II (پی ایس-78، جامشورو-2) is a constituency of the Provincial Assembly of Sindh.

== General elections 2024 ==
Provincial election 2024: PS-78 Jamshoro-II
Party	Candidate	Votes	%	±%
PPP	Sikandar Ali Shoro	51,193	73.02	
GDA	Syed Munir Hyder Shah	10,850	15.48	
PTI	Zahid Ali (Note: Filed nomination papers as PTI candidate but ECP allowed him to run as an Independent)	4,538	6.47	
JI	Shabnam Shakeel Ahmed	821	1.17	
Others	Others (twelve candidates)	2,711	3.86	
Turnout		71,822	45.38	
Total valid votes		70,113	97.62	
Rejected ballots		1,709	2.38	
Majority		40,343	57.54	
Registered electors		158,254		
PPP hold				

== General elections 2018 ==
Provincial election 2018: PS-82 Jamshoro-III
Party	Candidate	Votes	%	±%
PPP	Malik Asad Sikandar	40,604	49.69	
Independent	Sikandar Ali Shoro	36,315	44.44	
PTI	Malik Pahar Khan	2,076	2.54	
MMA	Rahib Ali Khoso	956	1.17	
Independent	Lal Muhammad	503	0.62	
Independent	Iqbal Masih	405	0.50	
PML(N)	Bakhtawar Malano	205	0.25	
PSP	Mamtaz Ali	152	0.19	
GDA	Haq Nawaz	141	0.17	
Independent	Liaquat Ali	139	0.17	
Independent	Zuhair Yousuf	115	0.14	
Independent	Ghulam Abbas Pirzada	73	0.09	
Independent	Sohail Ahmed Shoro	26	0.03	
Majority		4,289	5.25	
Valid ballots		81,710		
Rejected ballots		3,194		
Turnout		84,904		
Registered electors		141,545		
hold				

== General elections 2013 ==
Contesting candidates	Party affiliation	Votes polled

== General elections 2008 ==
Contesting candidates	Party affiliation	Votes polled

== See also ==
- PS-77 Jamshoro-I
- PS-79 Jamshoro-III
