= Ali Hassan Zardari =

Pakistani politician

Member of the Provincial Assembly of Sindh& Minister For Prisons, Sindh
- In office 13 August 2018 – 11 August 2023
- Constituency: PS-76 Thatta-II

Personal details
- Party: PPP (2018-present)

Ali Hassan Zardari is a Pakistani politician who had been a member of the Provincial Assembly of Sindh from August 2018 till August 2023 and again elected in February 2024. He is a cousin of Asif Ali Zardari.

== Political career ==
He was elected to the Provincial Assembly of Sindh on Pakistan Peoples Party ticket from Constituency PS-78 (Thatta-II) in the 2018 Pakistani general election.
