= Sikander Ali Rahupoto =

Pakistani politician

Member of the National Assembly of Pakistan
- In office 13 August 2018 – 10 August 2023
- Constituency: NA-233 (Jamshoro)

Personal details
- Other political affiliations: PPP (2018-present)

Sikander Ali Rahupoto is a Pakistani politician who had been a member of the National Assembly of Pakistan from August 2018 till August 2023.

== Political career ==
He was elected to the National Assembly of Pakistan from Constituency NA-233 (Jamshoro) as a candidate of Pakistan Peoples Party in the 2018 Pakistani general election.
