= Constituency PSW-146 =

Reserved constituency of the Provincial Assembly of Sindh, Pakistan

PSW-146
- Provincial reserved constituency for the Provincial Assembly of Sindh

Current constituency

PSW-146 is a constituency reserved for a female representative in the Provincial Assembly of Sindh.

== See also ==
- Sindh
