= Constituency PSW-149 =

Reserved constituency of the Provincial Assembly of Sindh, Pakistan

PSW-149
- Provincial Reserved constituency for the Provincial Assembly of Sindh

Current constituency

PSW-140 is a reserved Constituency for female in the Provincial Assembly of Sindh.

== See also ==
- Sindh
