= PS-79 Jamshoro-III =

Constituency of the Provincial Assembly of Sindh, Pakistan

- Constituency for the Provincial Assembly of Sindh
- Region: Thana Bulla Khan Tehsil and Kotri Tehsil (partly) of Jamshoro District
- Electorate: 141,799

Current constituency
- Member: Vacant
- Created from: PS-72 Dadu-II (2002-2018); PS-81 Jamshoro-II (2018-2023)

PS-79 Jamshoro-III (پی ایس-79، جامشورو-3) is a constituency of the Provincial Assembly of Sindh.

== General elections 2024 ==
Provincial election 2024: PS-79 Jamshoro-III
Party	Candidate	Votes	%	±%
PPP	Malik Sikandar Khan	42,959	69.75	
Independent	Malik Changez Khan	7,849	12.75	
Independent	Peer Murtaza Shah Jilani (Note: Filed nomination papers as PTI candidate but ECP allowed him to run as an Independent)	5,376	8.73	
GDA	Meer Ahmed	1,442	2.34	
TLP	Abdul Sattar Soomro	1,090	1.77	
Others	Others (eleven candidates)	2,871	4.66	
Turnout		65,012	45.86	
Total valid votes		61,587	94.73	
Rejected ballots		3,425	5.27	
Majority		35,110	57.00	
Registered electors		141,779		
PPP hold				

== General elections 2018 ==
Provincial election 2018: PS-81 Jamshoro-II
Party	Candidate	Votes	%	±%
PPP	Giyanoo Mal	34,957	52.14	
Independent	Malik Changez Khan	26,975	40.24	
PTI	Javed Akhtar	2,055	3.07	
TLP	Abdullah Palari	1,472	2.20	
GDA	Mian Khan	428	0.64	
MMA	Samina Rajput	354	0.53	
Independent	Dayo	332	0.50	
Independent	Rabia	249	0.37	
PSP	Gul Bahar	143	0.21	
Independent	Meer Ahmed	76	0.11	
Majority		7,982	11.90	
Valid ballots		67,041		
Rejected ballots		3,797		
Turnout		70,838		
Registered electors		135,985		
hold				

== General elections 2013 ==
Contesting candidates	Party affiliation	Votes polled

== General elections 2008 ==
Contesting candidates	Party affiliation	Votes polled

== See also ==
- PS-78 Jamshoro-II
- PS-80 Dadu-I
