= PS-76 Thatta-II =

Constituency of the Provincial Assembly of Sindh, Pakistan

- Constituency for the Provincial Assembly of Sindh
- Region: Ghorabari Tehsil (partly), Keti Bander Tehsil and Mirpur Sakro Tehsil of Thatta District
- Electorate: 254,835

Current constituency
- Member: Vacant
- Created from: PS-88 Thatta-V (2002-2018); PS-78 Thatta-II and PS-79 Thatta-III (2018-2023)

PS-76 Thatta-II (پی ایس-76، ٹهٹھہ-2) is a constituency of the Provincial Assembly of Sindh.

== General elections 2024 ==
Provincial election 2024: PS-76 Thatta-II
Party	Candidate	Votes	%	±%
PPP	Ali Hassan Zardari	71,408	81.86	
TLP	Altaf Hussain Kachhi	4,812	5.52	
Independent	Syed Ayaz Ali Shah	4,297	4.93	
PML(N)	Abdul Jabbar Arain	2,496	2.86	
Others	Others (five candidates)	4,219	4.83	
Turnout		90,516	35.52	
Total valid votes		87,232	96.37	
Rejected ballots		3,284	3.63	
Majority		66,596	76.34	
Registered electors		254,835		
PPP hold				

== General elections 2018 ==
Provincial election 2018: PS-78 Thatta-II
Party	Candidate	Votes	%	±%
PPP	Ali Hassan	48,835	84.40	
PTI	Zaib Niazi	4,350	7.52	
MMA	Abdul Majeed Samoon	3,841	6.64	
Independent	Abdul Hameed Panhwar	492	0.85	
Independent	Umatul Hafeez Shahbazi	343	0.59	
Majority		44,485	76.88	
Valid ballots		57,861		
Rejected ballots		2,892		
Turnout		60,753		
Registered electors		146,307		
hold				

== General elections 2013 ==
Contesting candidates	Party affiliation	Votes polled

== General elections 2008 ==
Contesting candidates	Party affiliation	Votes polled

== See also ==
- PS-75 Thatta-I
- PS-77 Jamshoro-I
