= List of members of the 11th Provincial Assembly of Sindh =

Elections for the 11th Provincial assembly of Sindh were held on 3 February 1993, along with general elections for the National Assembly of Pakistan and provincial elections in Punjab, Balochistan & N.W.F.P.

== List of members of the 11th Provincial Assembly of Sindh ==
Tenure of the 11th Provincial assembly of Sindh was from 20 February 1997 to 12 October 1999.

Serial	Name	Constituency	District
1	Haji Ahmed Yar Khan Shar	PS-1	Ghotki
2	Sardar Rahim Bux Khan Bozdar	PS-2	Ghotki
3	Sardar Ali Gohar Khan Mahar	PS-3	Ghotki
4	Jam Saifullah Khan Dharejo	PS-4	Sukkur
5	Syed Nasir Hussain Shah	PS-5	Sukkur
6	Muhammad Saleem Bandhan	PS-6	Sukkur
7	Nadir Hussain Kumario (death)	PS-7	Shikapur
7.A	Himat Ali Khan Kumario (by election)	PS-7	Shikapur
8	Maqbool Ahmed Shaikh	PS-8	Shikapur
9	Dr. Muhammad Ibrahim Jatoi	PS-9	Shikapur
10	Sardar Saleem Jan Khan Mazari	PS-10	Jacobabad
11	Sardar Sher Muhammad Khan Bijarani	PS-11	Jacobabad
12	Dr. Sohrab Khan Sarki	PS-12	Jacobabad
13	Mir Naseer Khan Khoso	PS-13	Jacobabad
14	Agha Ghulam Ali Khan Bulledi	PS-14	Jacobabad
15	Abdul Sattar Abbasi	PS-15	Naushahro Feroz
16	Syed Murad Ali Shah	PS-16	Naushahro Feroz
17	Syed Manzoor Hussain Shah	PS-17	Naushahro Feroz
18	Ghulam Murtaza Khan Jatoi	PS-18	Naushahro Feroz
19	Rais Masroor Khan Jatoi	PS-19	Naushahro Feroz
20	Asim Kabeer	PS-20	Nawab Shah
21	Jan Muhammad Brohi	PS-21	Nawab Shah
22	Khan Muhammad Dahri	PS-22	Nawab Shah
23	Ghulam Rasool Khan Unar	PS-23	Nawab Shah
24	Zafar Iqbal Bilal	PS-24	Khairpur
25	Pir Syed Saddaruddin Shah Rashdi	PS-25	Khairpur
26	Mahram Ali Sheikh	PS-26	Khairpur
27	Manzoor Hussain Wassan	PS-27	Khairpur
28	Sajid Ali Banbhan	PS-28	Khairpur
29	Mir Nadir Ali Khan Magsi	PS-29	Larkana
30	Ameer Bux Bhutto	PS-30	Larkana
31	Nisar Ahmed Khuhro	PS-31	Larkana
32	Ghulam Mujtaba Khan Isran	PS-32	Larkana
33	Haji Munawar Ali Khan Abbasi	PS-33	Larkana
34	Altaf Hussain Unar	PS-34	Larkana
35	Makhdoom Jamil Zaman	PS-35	Hyderabad
36	Makhdoom Rafiq Zaman	PS-36	Hyderabad
37	Pir Syed Amjad Hussain Shah Jillani	PS-37	Hyderabad
38	Dr. Muhammad Arif Razmi	PS-38	Hyderabad
39	Nawab Mirza Advocate (Speaker, resigned)	PS-39	Hyderabad
40	Syed Afzal Ahmed Shah	PS-40	Hyderabad
41	Zafar Ali Rajput	PS-41	Hyderabad
42	Syed Umeed Ali Shah	PS-42	Hyderabad
43	Abdul Sattar Bachani	PS-43	Hyderabad
44	Syed Mohsin Shah Bukhari	PS-44	Hyderabad
45	Haji Abdul Khaliq Soomro	PS-45	Hyderabad
46	Haji Abdul Ghafoor Nizamani	PS-46	Badin
47	Mir Allah Bux Talpur	PS-47	Badin
48	Dr. Sikandar Ali Mandhro	PS-48	Badin
49	Muhammad Ismail Rahoo	PS-49	Badin
50	Fareed Ahmed	PS-50	Mirpurkhas
51	Khair Muhammad Bhurgari	PS-51	Mirpurkhas
52	Mir Munawar Ali Khan Talpur	PS-52	Umerkot
53	Mir Munawar Ali Khan Talpur	PS-53	Umerkot
54	Mir Haji Muhammad Hayat Khan Talpur	PS-54	Mirpurkhas
55	Arbab Faiz Muhammad	PS-55	Tharparkar
56	Inayatullah Rahmoon	PS-56	Tharparkar
57	Makhdoom Saeed-uz-Zaman Atif alias Makhdoom Ghulam Hyder	PS-57	Tharparkar
58	Malik Asad Sikandar	PS-58	Dadu
59	Syed Jalal Mehmood Shah (Deputy Speaker)	PS-59	Dadu
60	Pir Mazharul Haq	PS-60	Dadu
61	Syed Ghulam Shah Jillani	PS-61	Dadu
62	Haji Ameer Bux Junejo	PS-62	Dadu
63	Liaquat Ali Khan Jatoi (Chief Minister, Sindh)	PS-63	Dadu
64	Rais Ali Ghulam Nizamani	PS-64	Sanghar
65	Pir Syed Sibghatullah Shah Rashdi	PS-65	Sanghar
66	Fakeer Waryam	PS-66	Sanghar
67	Rasool Bux Marri	PS-67	Sanghar
68	Muhammad Bux Khaskheli	PS-68	Sanghar
69	Abdul Wahid Soomro	PS-69	Thatta
70	Ghulam Qadir Palijo	PS-70	Thatta
71	Syed Aijaz Ali Shah Sheerazi	PS-71	Thatta
72	Muhammad Ali Malkani	PS-72	Thatta
73	Humayoon Muhammad Khan	PS-73	Karachi
74	Abdul Qadir Lakhani	PS-74	Karachi
75	Muhammad Kamran Jaffery	PS-75	Karachi
76	S. M. Mohiuddin	PS-76	Karachi
77	Shoaib Ahmed Bukhari	PS-77	Karachi
78	Afzal Anwar	PS-78	Karachi
79	Ahsanullah Khan	PS-79	Karachi
80	Muhammad Zahid Qureshi	PS-80	Karachi
81	Bashir Ahmed Farooqui (death)	PS-81	Karachi
82	Wakeel Ahmed Jamali	PS-82	Karachi
83	Muhammad Yousuf Khan	PS-83	Karachi
84	Khalid Bin Waleed	PS-84	Karachi
85	Abdul Khalique Jumma	PS-85	Karachi
86	Muhammad Farooq Awan	PS-86	Karachi
87	Muhammad Farooq Sattar	PS-87	Karachi
88	Liaquat Ali Qureshi	PS-88	Karachi
89	Saleem Zia	PS-89	Karachi
90	Sardar Abdul Raheem	PS-90	Karachi
91	Dr. Sagheer Ahmed Ansari	PS-91	Karachi
92	Muhammad Arif Siddiqui	PS-92	Karachi
93	Waseem Akhtar	PS-93	Karachi
94	Muhammad Hussain Khan	PS-94	Karachi
95	Muhammad Haroon Siddiqui	PS-95	Karachi
96	Qazi Khalid Ali Zahid Advocate	PS-96	Karachi
97	Aleem Adil Shaikh	PS-97	Karachi
98	Sher Muhammad Baloch	PS-98	Karachi
99	Abdul Sattar Ansari	PS-99	Karachi
100	Syed Zulfiqar Haider	PS-100	Karachi
Minority Members
101	Dinshaw H. Anklesaria	Sikh, Buddhists, Parsis & Others	
102	Michael Jawaid	Christians	
103	Saleem Khursheed Khokhar	Christians	
104	Malik Atta Muhammad	Quadianis	
105	Hameer Singh	Hindu	
106	Hari Ram	Hindu	
107	Mehru Mal Jagwani	Hindu	
108	Behru Lal	Hindu	
109	Giyanoo Mal	Hindu	
