= PS-77 Jamshoro-I =

Constituency of the Provincial Assembly of Sindh, Pakistan

- Constituency for the Provincial Assembly of Sindh
- Region: Sehwan Tehsil, Manjhand Tehsil (partly) including Sann town of Jamshoro District
- Electorate: 177,029

Current constituency
- Member: Vacant
- Created from: PS-73 Dadu-III (2002-2018); PS-80 Jamshoro-I (2018-2023)

PS-77 Jamshoro-I (پی ایس-77، جامشورو-1) is a constituency of the Provincial Assembly of Sindh.

== General elections 2024 ==
Provincial election 2024: PS-77 Jamshoro-I
Party	Candidate	Votes	%	±%
PPP	Murad Ali Shah	74,613	81.39	
GDA	Roshan Ali Buriro	10,268	11.20	
PTI	Muhammad Farooque (Note: Filed nomination papers as PTI candidate but ECP allowed him to run as an Independent)	2,899	3.16	
Others	Others (thirteen candidates)	3,889	4.25	
Turnout		94,599	53.44	
Total valid votes		91,669	96.90	
Rejected ballots		2,930	3.10	
Majority		64,345	70.19	
Registered electors		177,029		
PPP hold				

== General elections 2018 ==
Provincial election 2018: PS-80 Jamshoro-I
Party	Candidate	Votes	%	±%
PPP	Murad Ali Shah	74,613	62.94	
SUP	Syed Jalal Mehmood	21,915	27.33	
Independent	Faheem Khaskheli	2,108	2.63	
Independent	Sikandar Ali	1,899	2.37	
TLP	Mehmood Ur Rehman	1,208	1.51	
PTI	Syed Muhamamd Ali Shah	974	1.30	
Independent	Abdullah Baloch	434	0.54	
Independent	Altaf Hussain	312	0.39	
Independent	Abdul Haleem	236	0.29	
PPP(SB)	Nisar Ahmed Lund	143	0.18	
Independent	Abdul Ahad Katohar	79	0.10	
Independent	Mir Hassan Panhyar	77	0.10	
Independent	Roshan Ali Buriro	60	0.07	
GDA	Syed Haidar Abbas	52	0.06	
Independent	Aijaz Ali	51	0.06	
Independent	Ghulam Hasan Qureshi	46	0.06	
Independent	Maqbool Panhwar	33	0.04	
Independent	Azhar Hussain Jamali	17	0.02	
Independent	Qurban Ali Solangi	7	0.01	
Majority		28,552	35.61	
Valid ballots		80,188		
Rejected ballots		4,382		
Turnout		84,570		
Registered electors		148,939		
hold				

== General elections 2013 ==
Contesting candidates	Party affiliation	Votes polled

== General elections 2008 ==
Contesting candidates	Party affiliation	Votes polled

== See also ==
- PS-76 Thatta-II
- PS-78 Jamshoro-II
