= Malik Sikandar Khan (Sindh politician) =

Member of the Provincial Assembly of Sindh from Jamshoro (2024–2029)

- ملڪ سکندر خان

Member of the Provincial Assembly of Sindh
- Incumbent
- Assumed office 25 February 2024
- Constituency: PS-79 Jamshoro-III

Personal details
- Party: PPP (2024-present)
- Relations: Malik Sikandar Khan Hamlani (Grandfather)
- Parent: Asad Sikandar (father)

Malik Sikandar Khan (Sindhi: ملڪ سکندر خان Urdu: ملک سکندر خان) is a Pakistani politician who is member of the Provincial Assembly of Sindh.

== Political career ==
Khan won the 2024 Sindh provincial election from PS-79 Jamshoro-III as a Pakistan People’s Party candidate. He received 42,959 votes while runner up Independent candidate Malik Changez Khan received 7,849 votes.
