= PS-75 Thatta-I =

Constituency of the Provincial Assembly of Sindh, Pakistan

- Constituency for the Provincial Assembly of Sindh
- Region: Thatta Tehsil and Ghorabari Tehsil (partly) of Thatta District
- Electorate: 267,551

Current constituency
- Member: Vacant
- Created from: PS-84 Thatta-I (2002-2018); PS-77 Thatta-I and PS-79 Thatta-III (2018-2023)

PS-75 Thatta-I (پی ایس-75، ٹهٹھہ-1) is a constituency of the Provincial Assembly of Sindh.

== General elections 2024 ==
Provincial election 2024: PS-75 Thatta-I
Party	Candidate	Votes	%	±%
PPP	Riaz Hussain Shah Sheerazi	80,745	80.88	
JUI (F)	Mohammad Arshad Memon	6,596	6.61	
JI	Abdullah Adam Gandro	3,829	3.84	
Independent	Syed Amjad Hussain (Note: Filed nomination papers as PTI candidate but ECP allowed him to run as an independent)	3,757	3.76	
Others	Others (seven candidates)	4,907	4.91	
Turnout		104,897	39.21	
Total valid votes		99,834	95.17	
Rejected ballots		5,063	4.83	
Majority		74,149	74.27	
Registered electors		267,551		
PPP hold				

== General elections 2018 ==
Provincial election 2018: PS-77 Thatta-I
Party	Candidate	Votes	%	±%
PPP	Syed Riaz Hussain Shah Sheerazi	50,911	76.61	
PTI	Arslan Bux Brohi	5,129	7.72	
MMA	Abdullah Adam Gandro	2,994	4.51	
Independent	Lakhmir Khan Palari	2,337	3.52	
Independent	Abdullah	1,024	1.54	
Independent	Mansoor Ahmed Memon	866	1.30	
GDA	Shah Nawaz Brohi	775	1.17	
Independent	Tahir Ahmed Memon	566	0.85	
Independent	Hakim Ali Brohi	565	0.85	
Independent	Muhammed Dawood	499	0.75	
Independent	Jameel Samoon	261	0.39	
Independent	Manzoor Ahmed Khushik	258	0.39	
Independent	Syed Aijaz Ali Shah Sheerazi	87	0.13	
Independent	Qurban Ali Magsi	81	0.12	
Independent	Ramesh Kumar Lohana	36	0.05	
Independent	Syed Pir Ghulam Rehmani	33	0.05	
Independent	Syed Karim Dino Shah Sheerazi	32	0.05	
Majority		45,782	68.89	
Valid ballots		66,454		
Rejected ballots		2,839		
Turnout		69,293		
Registered electors		147,826		
hold				

== General elections 2013 ==
Contesting candidates	Party affiliation	Votes polled

== General elections 2008 ==
Contesting candidates	Party affiliation	Votes polled

== See also ==
- PS-74 Sujawal-II
- PS-76 Thatta-II
