= List of members of the 6th Provincial Assembly of Sindh =

Elections for the 6th Provincial assembly of Sindh were held on 10 March, following the 1977 general elections held on 7 March 1977, along with provincial elections in Punjab, Balochistan & N.W.F.P.

== List of members of the 6th Provincial Assembly of Sindh ==
Tenure of the 6th Provincial assembly of Sindh was from 30 March till 5 July 1977, it was the shortest provincial assembly. General Zia-ul-Haq declared martial law on 5 July dissolving all assemblies in Pakistan including that of Sindh.

Serial	Name	Constituency	District
1	Jam Abdul Razzaq Khan Dahar	PS-1	Sukkur
2	Khan Muhammad Bozdar	PS-2	Sukkur
3	Ali Anwar Khan Mahar	PS-3	Sukkur
4	Abdul Mujeeb Pirzada	PS-4	Sukkur
5	Dr. Akbar Hussain Musavi	PS-5	Sukkur
6	Munawar Khan	PS-6	Sukkur
7	Ghous Bux Khan Mahar	PS-7	Sukkur
8	Agha Sadruddin Durani	PS-8	Sukkur
9	Rahim Bux Soomro	PS-9	Sukkur
10	Aftab Shahban Mirani	PS-10	Sukkur
11	Mir Shah Ali Domki	PS-11	Jacobabad.
12	Mir Sahib Sunder Khan Sundrani	PS-12	Jacobabad.
13	Mir Hazar Khan Bijarani	PS-13	Jacobabad.
14	Dur Muhammad Osto	PS-14	Jacobabad.
15	Muhammad Alam Odho	PS-15	Jacobabad.
16	Qazi Ghulam Hadi	PS-16	Nawab Shah
17	Syed Zafar Ali Shah	PS-17	Nawab Shah
18	Abdul Rahim Abbasi	PS-18	Nawab Shah
19	Ghulam Mustafa Jatoi	PS-19	Nawab Shah
20	Jam Kararuddin	PS-20	Nawab Shah
21	Rais Haji Ali Nawaz Unar	PS-21	Nawab Shah
22	Rais Ghulam Rasool Unar	PS-22	Nawab Shah
23	Syed Nazar Shah	PS-23	Nawab Shah
24	Rais Dad Muhammad Khan Rind	PS-24	Nawab Shah
25	Hadi Bux Larik	PS-25	Khairpur
26	Qadir Bux Mari	PS-26	Khairpur
27	Pir Asadullah Shah	PS-27	Khairpur
28	Mir Atta Hussain Talpur	PS-28	Khairpur
29	Rais Muhammad Malook Shar	PS-29	Khairpur
30	Pir Bux Bhutto	PS-30	Larkana
31	Abdul Ghafoor Bhurgri	PS-31	Larkana
32	Ali Hassan Hakro	PS-32	Larkana
33	Abdul Waheed Katpar	PS-33	Larkana
34	Wahid Bux Bughio	PS-34	Larkana
35	Chakar Ali Junejo	PS-35	Larkana
36	Imdad Hussain Kehar	PS-36	Larkana
37	Makhdoom Muhammad Amin Fahim	PS-37	Hyderabad
38	Syed Amir Ali Shah Jamot	PS-38	Hyderabad
39	Syed Muhammad Hassan Shah	PS-39	Hyderabad
40	Haji Abdul Sattar Bachani	PS-40	Hyderabad
41	Syed Ali Nawaz Shah	PS-41	Hyderabad
42	Abdul Majeed Khanzada	PS-42	Hyderabad
43	Khalid Bin Jaffar	PS-43	Hyderabad
44	Aftab Ahmed Shaikh	PS-44	Hyderabad
45	Qazi Muhammad Azam	PS-45	Hyderabad
46	Makhdoom Khaliquzzaman	PS-46	Hyderabad
47	Mir Mumtaz Ali Talpur	PS-47	Hyderabad
48	Pir Saeed Jan Sarhandi	PS-48	Hyderabad
49	Haji Ghulam Badar Nizamani	PS-49	Badin
50	Bashir Hussain Leghari	PS-50	Badin
51	Syed Qamar Zaman Shah	PS-51	Badin
52	Haji Abdul Khailq Soomro	PS-52	Badin
53	Pir Aftab Hussain Jillani	PS-53	Tharparkar
54	Syed Ali Qutub Shah	PS-54	Tharparkar
55	Nawab Muhammad Yousuf Talpur	PS-55	Tharparkar
56	Arbab Faiz Muhammad	PS-56	Tharparkar
57	Arbab Nor Muhammad	PS-57	Tharparkar
58	Abdul Kareem Palli	PS-58	Tharparkar
59	Mir Imam Bux Talpur	PS-59	Tharparkar
60	Haji Muhammad Siddiq Shoro	PS-60	Dadu
61	Syed Abdullah Shah	PS-61	Dadu
62	Muneer Ahmed Channa	PS-62	Dadu
63	Pir Muhammad Khan Shahani	PS-63	Dadu
64	Haji Zaffar Ali Leghari	PS-64	Dadu
65	Aashiq Hussain Jatoi	PS-65	Dadu
66	Ghulam Hyder Wassan	PS-66	Sanghar
67	Muhammad Usman Chaniho	PS-67	Sanghar
68	Jam Anwer Ali Khan	PS-68	Sanghar
69	Jam Sadiq Ali	PS-69	Sanghar
70	Abdul Wahid Brohi	PS-70	Sanghar
71	Abdul Hameed Memon	PS-71	Thatta
72	Akhtar Hussain Shah	PS-72	Thatta
73	Sahib Dino Gaho	PS-73	Thatta
74	Mamoon Khan Malkani	PS-74	Thatta
75	Wazeer Ahmad Memon	PS-75	Thatta
76	Qasim Haji Abbas Patel	PS-76	Karachi
77	Ameer Hyder Kazmi	PS-77	Karachi
78	Ameer Ahmed	PS-78	Karachi
79	Muhammad Ali Gabol	PS-79	Karachi
80	Zahir Qasim	PS-80	Karachi
81	Abdullah Baloch	PS-81	Karachi
82	Abdul Rahim Baloch	PS-82	Karachi
83	Ismail Burhani	PS-83	Karachi
84	Ahmed Ali Soomro	PS-84	Karachi
85	Mian Muhammad Akhtar	PS-85	Karachi
86	Muhammad Ilias Ghanchi	PS-86	Karachi
87	Muhammad Hanif Soldier	PS-87	Karachi
88	Abdul Khaliq Allahwala	PS-88	Karachi
89	Syed Zia Abbas	PS-89	Karachi
90	Piyar Ali Alana	PS-90	Karachi
91	Abdul Bari Khan	PS-91	Karachi
92	Ahmed Aziz Farooqui	PS-92	Karachi
93	Abdul Sammi Khan	PS-93	Karachi
94	Amanullah Khattak	PS-94	Karachi
95	K. M. Sammi	PS-95	Karachi
96	Rukanuddin Khan	PS-96	Karachi
97	Syed Sagheer Hussain Jafferi	PS-97	Karachi
98	Abdul Qayyum Jokhio	PS-98	Karachi
99	Shafi Muhammad	PS-99	Karachi
100	Sher Muhammad Baloch	PS-100	Karachi
101	Ashraf Abbasi	Reserved Seat for Women	
102	Begum Zubaida Bashir Ahmed Naro	Reserved Seat for Women	
103	Firdous Junejo	Reserved Seat for Women	
104	Zakia Iqbal Brohi	Reserved Seat for Women	
105	Rukhsana Zuberi	Reserved Seat for Women	
106	P. K. Shahani	Reserved Seat for Minority	
107	Jivraj K. Meheshri	Reserved Seat for Minority	
