= Shamsunnisa Memon =

Pakistani politician

- شمس النساء ميمڻ;

Member of the National Assembly of Pakistan
- In office 13 August 2018 – 10 August 2023
- Constituency: NA-232 (Thatta)
- In office 30 August 2013 – 31 May 2018
- Constituency: NA-237 (Thatta-I)

Personal details
- Other political affiliations: PPP (2013-2024)
- Children: Sadiq Ali Memon (son)

Shamsunnisa Memon (Sindhi:شمس النساء ميمڻ;Urdu: شمس النساء میمن) is a Pakistani politician who had been a member of the National Assembly of Pakistan, from August 2018 till August 2023. Previously she was a member of the National Assembly from August 2013 to May 2018.

== Political career ==
Shamsunnisa was elected as the member of the National Assembly of Pakistan as a candidate of Pakistan Peoples Party (PPP) from Constituency NA-237 (Thatta-I) in by-election held in August 2013. She received 84,819 votes and defeated Syed Riaz Hussain Shah Sherazi, a candidate of Pakistan Muslim League (N) (PML-N). The seat became vacant after Sadiq Ali Memon who won it in May 2013 election was disqualified to continue in office because of dual nationality case.

She was re-elected to the National Assembly as a candidate of PPP from Constituency NA-232 (Thatta) in the 2018 Pakistani general election.
