= List of members of the 7th Provincial Assembly of Sindh =

Elections for 7th Provincial assembly of Sindh, Pakistan were held on 28 February 1985, following the general elections on 25 February, along with the provincial elections of Punjab, Balochistan & N.W.F.P under the Military rule of General Zia-ul-Haq.

== List of members of the 7th Provincial Assembly of Sindh ==
Tenure of the 6th Provincial assembly of Sindh was from 28 February 1985 till 30 May 1988.

Serial	Name	Constituency	District
1	Ahmed Yar Khan Shar	PS-1	Sukkur
2	Rahim Bux Khan Bozdar	PS-2	Sukkur
3	Ali Anwar Khan Mahar (Resigned)	PS-3	Sukkur
3.A	Syed Ghous Ali Shah (By Election) (Oath 30-05-1985)	PS-3	Sukkur
4	Ali Murad Khan Dharejo	PS-4	Sukkur
5	Syed Khadim Ali Shah	PS-5	Sukkur
6	Munawar Khan	PS-6	Sukkur
7	Junaid Ahmed Soomro	PS-7	Shikarpur
8	Nadir Hussain Khan Kumario	PS-8	Shikarpur
9	Ghous Bux Khan Mahar	PS-9	Shikarpur
10	Iftikhar Ahmed Soomro	PS-10	Shikarpur
11	Sardar Saleem Jan Khan Mazari	PS-11	Jacobabad
12	Sardar Sher Muhammad Khan Bijarani	PS-12	Jacobabad
13	Sardar Haji Wahid Bux Sarki	PS-13	Jacobabad
14	Mir Arz Muhammad Khan Jakhrani	PS-14	Jacobabad
15	Sardar Muhammad Muqeem Khan Khoso	PS-15	Jacobabad
16	Syed Munawar Ali Shah	PS-16	Nawab Shah
17	Syed Murad Ali Shah	PS-17	Nawab Shah
18	Ahmed Khan Rajpar	PS-18	Nawab Shah
19	Abdul Haq Alias Dost Muhammad Bhurt	PS-19	Nawab Shah
20	Dil Murad Khan Jamali (Late)	PS-20	Nawab Shah
20.A	Haji Jam Qarauddin (By Election). (Oath 30-05-1985)	PS-20	Nawab Shah
21	Raza Muhammad Dahri.	PS-21	Nawab Shah
22	Syed Nawaz Ali Shah	PS-22	Nawab Shah
23	Syed Shoukat Hussain Shah	PS-23	Nawab Shah
24	Syed Imdad Muhammad Shah	PS-24	Nawab Shah
25	Sher Muhammad Uner	PS-25	Nawab Shah
26	Imtiaz Hussain Phulpoto (Oath 12-03-1985)	PS-26	Khairpur
26.A	Zafar Iqbal Bilal. (Oath 31-03-1986)	PS-26	Khairpur
26.B	Imtiaz Hussain Phulpoto (Oath 20-10-1986)	PS-26	Khairpur
27	Pir Sibghatullah Shah	PS-27	Khairpur
28	Syed Sarkar Hussain Shah	PS-28	Khairpur
29	Mir Ghulam Ali Alias Mir Gullan Talpur	PS-29	Khairpur
30	Jalaluddin Banbhan	PS-30	Khairpur
31	Khuda Dino Khan Chandio	PS-31	Larkana
32	Sardar Allah Bux Jalbani	PS-32	Larkana
33	Masood Ahmed Khuhro	PS-33	Larkana
34	Ali Hassan Hakro	PS-34	Larkana
35	Akhtar Ali G. Qazi	PS-35	Larkana
36	Ghulam Hussain Khan Unar	PS-36	Larkana
37	Kamil Khan Jamali	PS-37	Hyderabad
38	Syed Shafqat Ali Shah	PS-38	Hyderabad
39	Abdul Ghani Dars	PS-39	Hyderabad
40	Menyoon Wali Muhammad Walhari	PS-40	Hyderabad
41	Zafar Ali Rajput	PS-41	Hyderabad
41.A	Abdul Waheed Qureshi. (Oath 29-10-1986)	PS-41	Hyderabad
42	Abdul Qayoom Shaikh	PS-42	Hyderabad
43	Mir Hyder Ali Khan Talpur	PS-43	Hyderabad
44	Nawabzada Rashid Ali Khan	PS-44	Hyderabad
45	Syed Ahad Yousuf	PS-45	Hyderabad
46	Haji Rawal Pahore	PS-46	Hyderabad
47	Mir Aijaz Ali Talpur	PS-47	Hyderabad
48	Haji Abdul Khalique Soomro	PS-48	Hyderabad
49	Ali Akbar Khan Nizamani	PS-49	Badin
50	Mir Allah Bux Talpur	PS-50	Badin
51	Syed Ali Bux Shah	PS-51	Badin
52	Sardar Muhammad Yousuf Chang	PS-52	Badin
53	Abdul Ghaffar Qureshi	PS-53	Tharparkar
54	Mir Lutfullah Khan Talpur	PS-54	Tharparkar
55	Mir Haji Muhammad Hayat Khan Talpur	PS-55	Tharparkar
56	Arbab Faiz Muhammad	PS-56	Tharparkar
57	Pir Noor Muhammad Shah	PS-57	Tharparkar
58	Syed Muzaffar Hussain Shah	PS-58	Tharparkar
59	Mir Munawar Ali Khan Talpur	PS-59	Tharparkar
60	Malik Asad Sikandar	PS-60	Dadu
61	Syed Koural Shah Alias Syed Ghulam Murtaza Shah	PS-61	Dadu
62	Syed Muhammad Shah	PS-62	Dadu
63	Ali Akbar Khan Leghari	PS-63	Dadu
64	Liaquat Ali Khan Jatoi. (Oath 30-05-1985)	PS-64	Dadu
65	Qazi Shafique Ahmed	PS-65	Dadu
66	Haji Khuda Bux Rajar	PS-66	Sanghar
67	Khalifo Muhammad Aqil Hingoro	PS-67	Sanghar
68	Waryam Fakir	PS-68	Sanghar
69	Rasool Bux Khan Mari	PS-69	Sanghar
70	Mir Muhammad Wassan	PS-70	Sanghar
71	Syed Aijaz Ali Shah Sheerazi	PS-71	Thatta
72	Jam Bijar Khan	PS-72	Thatta
73	Muhammad Mossa Khan Chandio (Late)	PS-73	Thatta
73.A	Khan Muhammad Chandio (By Election). (Oath 2506–1986)	PS-73	Thatta
74	Ghulam Qadir Malkani	PS-74	Thatta
75	Muzaffar Ali Khan Leghari	PS-75	Thatta
76	K. S. Mujahid Baloch	PS-76	Karachi
77	M. K. Haseeb Hashmi	PS-77	Karachi
78	Moulana Muhammad Zakariya	PS-78	Karachi
79	Al-Haj Shamimuddin	PS-79	Karachi
80	Muhammad Athar Siddiqui	PS-80	Karachi
81	Naiamatullah	PS-81	Karachi
82	Hafiz Muhammad Taqi	PS-82	Karachi
83	Akhlaq Ahmed	PS-83	Karachi
84	Muhammad Athar Qureshi	PS-84	Karachi
85	Abdul Sattar Vayani	PS-85	Karachi
86	Muhammad Usman Soomro	PS-86	Karachi
87	Abdul Aziz	PS-87	Karachi
88	Ghulam Hussain	PS-88	Karachi
89	Haji Aziz Karim	PS-89	Karachi
90	Zuhair Akram Nadeem	PS-90	Karachi
91	Syed Abdul Bari Jilani	PS-91	Karachi
92	Malik Muhammad Hanif	PS-92	Karachi
93	Abdullah Hussain Haroon	PS-93	Karachi
94	Abdul Majeed Choudhary	PS-94	Karachi
95	Javaid Sultan Japanwala	PS-95	Karachi
96	Abbas Ba Wazir	PS-96	Karachi
97	Hafiz Muhammad Bux Naimee	PS-97	Karachi
98	Naseeruddin	PS-98	Karachi
99	Haji Mumtaz Ahmed Qaiser	PS-99	Karachi
100	Muhammad Aslam Mujahid	PS-100	Karachi
Reserved Seats for Minorities
Serial	Name	Constituency	Religion
101	Eric Samuel Jacob	Reserved Seat for Minority	Christian
102	Bashir Alam Bhatti	Reserved Seat for Minority	Christian
102.A	Monica Kamran Dost	Reserved Seat for Minority	Christian
103	Assar Das	Reserved Seat for Minority	Hindu
104	Tikam	Reserved Seat for Minority	Hindu
105	Ram Singh	Reserved Seat for Minority	Hindu
106	Rattan Kumar	Reserved Seat for Minority	Hindu
107	Mangha Ram	Reserved Seat for Minority	Hindu
108	Hoshang Homi Broacha	Reserved Seat for Minority	Parsi
Reserved Seats for Women
109	Gulzar Unar	Reserved Sear for Women	Khairpur
110	Naureen Akhtari	Reserved Sear for Women	Sukkur
111	Ameena Ashraf	Reserved Sear for Women	Hyderabad
112	Maqbool Ahmed	Reserved Sear for Women	Shikarpur
113	Parveen Marri	Reserved Sear for Women	Sanghar
114	Lilavati Harchandani	Reserved Sear for Women	Hyderabad
