= Sikandar Ali Shoro =

Pakistani politician

- سڪندر علي شورو

Member of the Provincial Assembly of Sindh
- In office 29 May 2013 – 28 May 2018
- Constituency: PS-78 (Kotri) District Jamshoro

Personal details
- Born: 7 March 1976 (age 50) Kotri, Sindh, Pakistan
- Party: PPP (2016-present)

Dr Sikandar Ali Shoro (Sindhi: ڊاڪٽر سڪندر علي شورو) is a Pakistani politician who had been a Member of the Provincial Assembly of Sindh, from May 2013 to May 2018 & 8 February 2024 till still serving as provincial assembly member.

== Early life ==
He was born on 7 March 1976 in Kotri.

== Political career ==
He was elected to the Provincial Assembly of Sindh as a candidate of Pakistan Peoples Party from Constituency PS-78 JAMSHORO-I in the 2013 Pakistani general election.
