= Saleem Khursheed Khokhar =

Pakistani politician

Saleem Khursheed Khokhar is a Pakistani politician from Sindh Province.

== Career ==
Khokhar won three consecutive elections to the Sindh Provincial Assembly in 1990, 1993, and 1997 as a representative of the local Christian community; he secured re-election in 2008 from the Pakistan People's Party. A vocal advocate of minority rights, Khokhar has drawn attention to kidnapping and forced conversion of religious minorities in the region.

== Assassination attempts ==
Khokhar has been subject to multiple assassination attempts; in 2013, armed assailants attacked him in Thatta.
