= NA-193 Shikarpur =

Constituency of the National Assembly of Pakistan

- Constituency for the National Assembly of Pakistan
- Region: Garhi Yasin Tehsil, Lakhi Tehsil and Shikarpur Tehsil (partly) of Shikarpur District
- Electorate: 506,388

Current constituency
- Party: Pakistan People's Party
- Member: Muhammad Shaharyar Khan Mahar
- Created from: NA-203 Shikarpur-II

NA-193 Shikarpur (این اے-193، شِكارپُور) is a constituency for the National Assembly of Pakistan.

== Assembly Segments ==
Constituency number	Constituency	District	Current MPA	Party
9	PS-9 Shikarpur-III	Shikarpur District	Agha Siraj Durrani	PPP

== Members of Parliament ==
=== 2018–2023: NA-199 Shikarpur-II ===
Election	Member	Party
2018	Ghos Bakhsh Khan Mahar	GDA

=== 2024–present: NA-193 Shikarpur ===
Election	Member	Party
2024	Muhammad Shaharyar Khan Mahar	PPP

== Election 2002 ==
General elections were held on 10 October 2002. Ghous Bux Khan Mahar of PML-Q won by 61,432 votes.

General election 2002: NA-203 Shikarpur-II
Party	Candidate	Votes	%	±%
NA	Muhammad Ibrahim Jatoi	53,235	56.45	
PPP	Aftab Shahban Mirani	40,125	42.55	
Others	Others (three candidates)	941	1.00	
Turnout		96,447	37.74	
Total valid votes		94,301	97.78	
Rejected ballots		2,146	2.22	
Majority		13,110	13.90	
Registered electors		255,576		

== Election 2008 ==
General elections were held on 18 February 2008. Ghous Bux Khan Mahar of PML-Q won by 89,921 votes defeating Sardar Wahid Bakhsh Bhayo of PPP who received 39123 votes.

General election 2008: NA-203 Shikarpur-II
Party	Candidate	Votes	%	±%
PML(Q)	Ghous Bux Khan Mahar	89,921	69.50	
PPP	Sardar Wahid Bux Bhayo	39,123	30.24	
Others	Others (five candidates)	343	0.26	
Turnout		132,861	56.75	
Total valid votes		129,387	97.39	
Rejected ballots		3,474	2.61	
Majority		50,798	39.26	
Registered electors		234,137		
PML(Q) hold				

== Election 2013 ==
General elections were held on 11 May 2013. Ghous Bux Khan Mahar of PML-F won by 77,065 votes defeating Sardar Wahid Bakhsh Bhayo of PPP who received 41919 votes and became the member of National Assembly.

General election 2013: NA-203 Shikarpur-II
Party	Candidate	Votes	%	±%
PML(F)	Ghous Bux Khan Mahar	77,065	59.05	
PPP	Sardar Wahid Bux Bhayo	41,919	32.12	
JUI (F)	Muhammad Yaqoob Mahar	8,861	6.79	
Others	Others (six candidates)	2,666	2.04	
Turnout		135,011	59.04	
Total valid votes		130,511	96.67	
Rejected ballots		4,500	3.33	
Majority		35,146	26.93	
Registered electors		228,663		
PML(F) gain from PML(Q)				

== Election 2018 ==
General elections were held on 25 July 2018.

General election 2018: NA-199 Shikarpur-II
Party	Candidate	Votes	%	±%
GDA	Ghos Bakhsh Khan Mahar	62,785	45.82	▼13.26^{†}
PPP	Zulfiqar Ali Kamario	55,987	40.86	▲8.77
Others	Others (four candidates)	18,264	13.32	
Turnout		145,047	49.75	
Total valid votes		137,036	94.48	
Rejected ballots		8,011	5.52	
Majority		6,798	4.96	
Registered electors		291,567		
GDA hold				

^{†}PML (F) contested as part of GDA

== Election 2024 ==
General elections were held on 8 February 2024. Muhammad Shaharyar Khan Mahar won the election with 138,634 votes.

General election 2024: NA-193 Shikarpur
Party	Candidate	Votes	%	±%
PPP	Muhammad Shaharyar Khan Mahar	138,634	64.05	▲23.19
JUI (F)	Rashid Mahmood Soomro	59,519	27.50	
Others	Others (twelve candidates)	18,305	8.46	
Turnout		225,203	44.48	▼5.27
Total valid votes		216,458	96.12	
Rejected ballots		8,745	3.88	
Majority		79,115	36.55	
Registered electors		506,341		
PPP gain from JUI (F)				

== See also ==
- NA-192 Kashmore-cum-Shikarpur
- NA-194 Larkana-I
