= Lodra, Shikarpur =

Town in Sindh, Pakistan

Lodra
- Small Town
- Lodra
- Location in Sindh Lodra (Pakistan) Lodra (Asia) Lodra (Earth)
- Coordinates: 27°59′30″N 68°38′20″E
- Country: Pakistan
- Province: Sindh
- District: Shikarpur
- Elevation: 210 m (690 ft)

Population (2017)
  - Small Town: 7,000
  - Estimate (2025): 18,000
- Time zone: UTC+05:00 (PST)
- Post code: 78101
- Calling code: 0726

Lodra (Sindhi: لــوڊرا) is an area like small town in Sindh. Lodra is situated nearby to Goth Ubaidullah, and close to Goth Amal Khan Baloch. Shikarpur railway station is located in Shikarpur city, Shikarpur district of Sindh province of the Pakistan. Shikarpur railway station is situated 4 km south of Lodra.

== See also ==
- Sultan Kot
- Shikarpur, Sindh
- Jacobabad
