= Muhammad Shaharyar Khan Mahar =

Pakistani politician

- محمد شهريار خان مهر

Member of the National Assembly of Pakistan
- Incumbent
- Assumed office 29 February 2024
- Constituency: NA-193 Shikarpur

Member of the Provincial Assembly of Sindh
- In office 13 August 2018 – 11 August 2023
- Constituency: PS-8 Shikarpur-II
- In office 29 May 2013 – 28 May 2018
- Constituency: PS-10 Shikarpur-cum-Sukkur

Personal details
- Born: 6 February 1976 (age 50) Shikarpur, Sindh, Pakistan
- Party: PPP (2023-present)
- Other political affiliations: GDA (2018-2023)
- Parent: Ghos Bakhsh Khan Mahar (father)

Muhammad Shaharyar Khan Mahar (Sindhi:محمد شهريار خان مهر) is a Pakistani politician who has been a member of the National Assembly of Pakistan since February 2024. He was also a member of the Provincial Assembly of Sindh from August 2018 till August 2023 and from May 2013 to May 2018.

== Early life and education ==
He was born on 6 February 1976 in Shikarpur.

He has a degree of Bachelor of Arts, a degree of Master of Art and a degree of Bachelor of Laws.

== Political career ==
He was elected to the Provincial Assembly of Sindh as a candidate of Pakistan Muslim League (F) from PS-10 Shikarpur-cum-Sukkur in the 2013 Sindh provincial election.

He was re-elected to Provincial Assembly of Sindh as a candidate of the Grand Democratic Alliance (GDA) from PS-8 Shikarpur-II in the 2018 Sindh provincial election.

On 20 July 2023, he joined Pakistan People's Party (PPP) along with his father.

He was elected to the National Assembly of Pakistan from NA-193 Shikarpur as a candidate of PPP in the 2024 Pakistani general election. He received 138,634 votes and defeated Rashid Mahmood Soomro, a candidate of Jamiat Ulema-e-Islam (F) (JUI(F)).
