= Pir Chandam =

Coordinates: 27°47′55.33″N 68°25′25.71″E

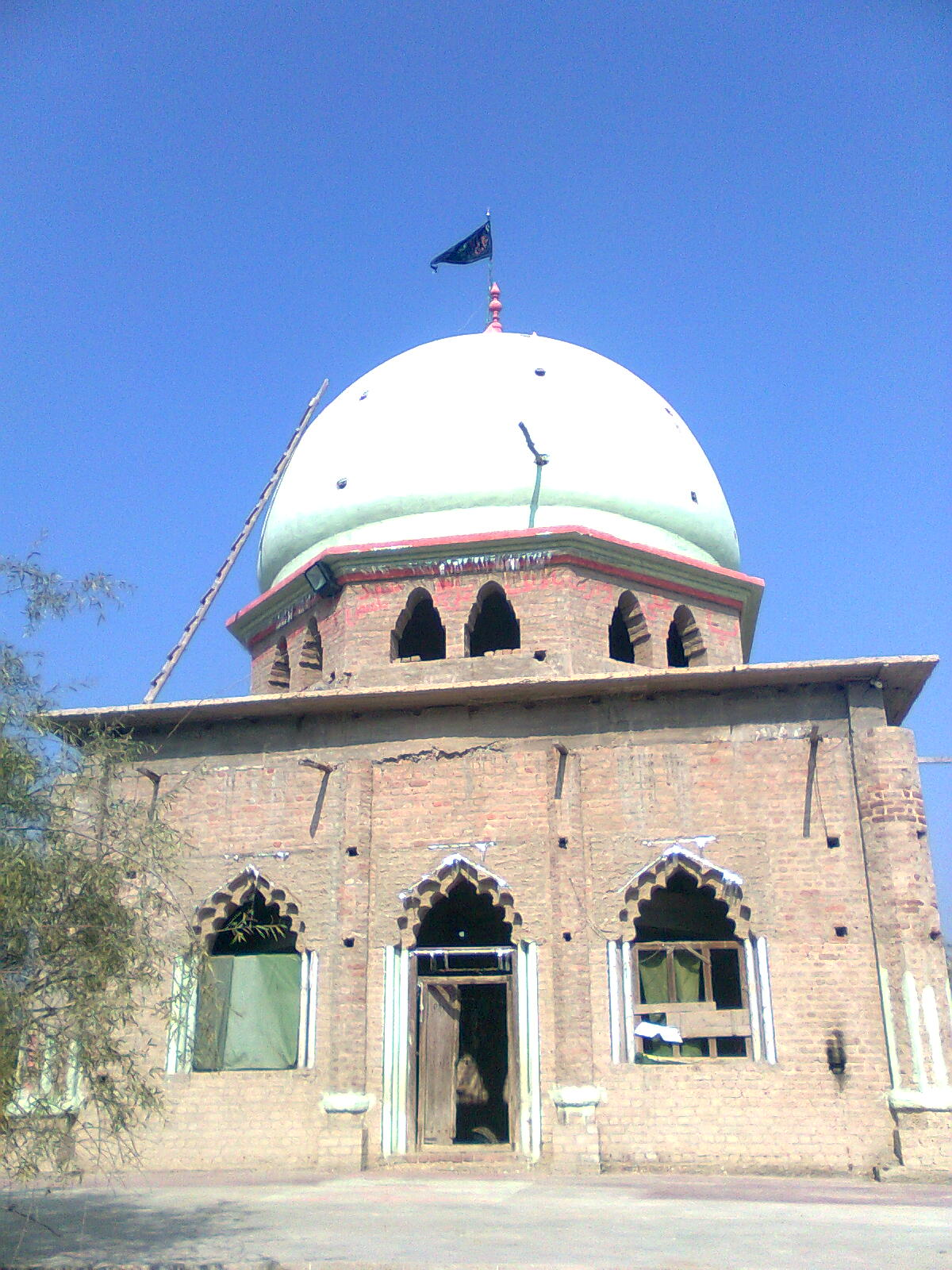
Pir chandam shrine

Pir Chandam (also "Pir Chandan", "Pir Chandram") is a small village with a shrine dedicated to Sufi Pir Chandam. The village is to the east of Dakhan and to the north-west of Madeji in Shikarpur, Sindh.
