= Channa Mohallah =

Channa Mohallah may refer to:

- Channa Mohallah, Jacobabad, a town in Jacobabad in Sindh, Pakistan
- Channa Mohallah, Mian Sahib, a locality and neighbor of Mian Sahib
