= Mian Sahib =

Place in Sindh, Pakistan

Mian Sahib ميان صاحب
- Town
- Mian Jo Goth (Sindhi: ميان جو گوٺ)
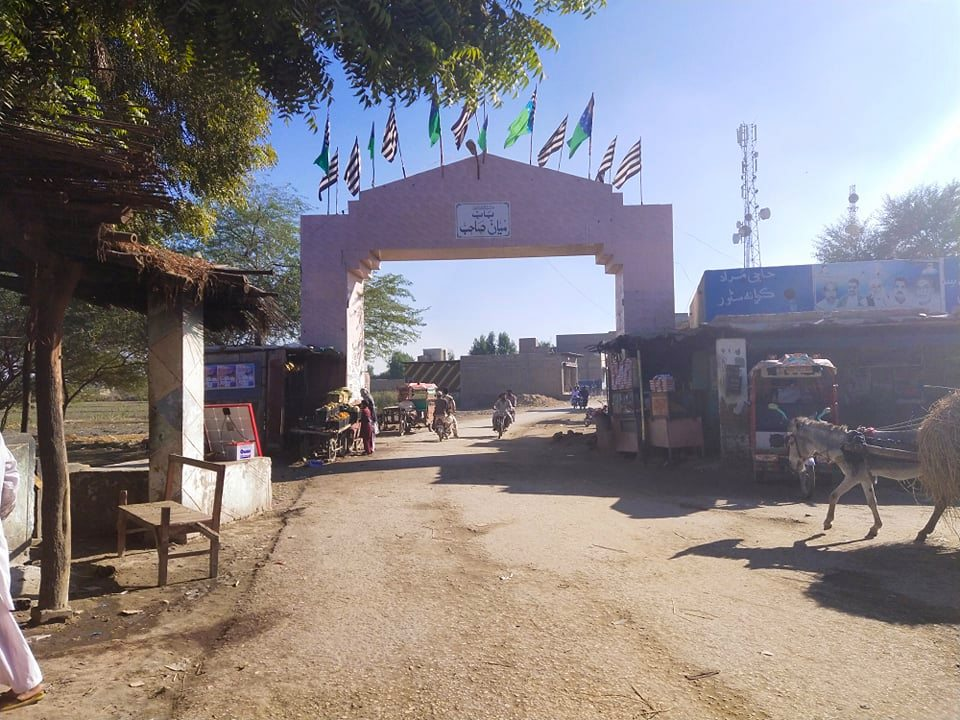
- Entrance gate of Mian Sahib (Bab-e-Mian Sahib)
- Nickname: Mian Sahib (Sindhi: ميان صاحب) (Urdu: میاں صاحب)
- Location in Sindh Mian Sahib (Pakistan) Mian Sahib (Asia) Mian Sahib (Earth)
- Coordinates: 28°9′21.168″N 68°38′23.064″E
- Country: Pakistan
- Province: Sindh
- District: Shikarpur
- Tehsil: khanpur
- Union Council: Mian-Jo-Goth UC NO:12

Government
  - Chairman: Mian Abdul Manan Panhyar
  - Vice-Chairman: Amjad Ali Tanwari
- Elevation: 210 m (690 ft)

Population (2017)
  - City: 11,276
  - Estimate (2025): 15,000
- Time zone: UTC+05:00 (PST)
- Post code: 78100
- Calling code: 0726

Mian Sahib (Sindhi: ميان صاحب), Mian Jo Goth (Sindhi: ميان جو گوٺ) is the town of Shikarpur District in the Sindh Province of Pakistan, is a union council. It is located at 28°9'17"N 68°38'32"E at an altitude of 59 metres (196 feet). Mian Sahib, is a historical village of Shikarpur District, although Mian Sahib is now a relatively small city, it borders with the nearest town Mubarakpur, Jacobabad town of Jacobabad District and it's also the largest town of the tehsil Khanpur, Sindh Of Shikarpur District.

The city has long been an educational and art centre: it is renowned for its intact historic personalities many prominent Sindhi literary figures, philosophers, poets, writers, artists and musicians live or have lived in the city, and it was the place where the Sindhu Magazine was started. In the 20th century the Hindi-Urdu writer Khialdas Fani and the Boolchand Wasoomal. Famous Pakistani poet Shaikh Ayaz was student of Khialdas Fani and studied poetry from him at Mian Sahib. Later education in Mian Sahib was greatly influenced by the rise of Raees Kareem bakhsh Tanwiri, Yar Muhammad Tanwri the late 19th century. Boolchand Wasoomal founded the weekly magazine named Sindhu in 1932 till 1936.

In 1980, Agha Gulam Nabi pathan founded the Al-Shabaaz Goth Sudhaar organization; it was the first movement of city. Sindhi Adabi Sangat was established by Ustaad Rahi in 1983, and Mian Sahib is widely famous for its three shrines dedicated to Muslim mystics (Sufis) from the 17th to 19th centuries that are embellished with extensive tile work, and were built in the distinct architectural style of Iran.

== History ==
The origins of Mian Sahib are obscure, and historical records accurately detailing its founding are divided into several mythologies. According to some accounts, the city was founded by Saint Mian Taj Muhammad Mahar, who while on a preaching and spreading his mentors teaching expedition, was charmed by the surrounding area, and ordered the construction of the settlement and land cultivation of Mian Sahib, alternatively known "Mian Jo Goth", which was named in his honour. The name "Mian jo Goth", a contracted version of the Mian Taj's name, eventually gained favour, though the older name the "Pat" had been used up until at least the 1820s.

== Etymology ==
Earlier in the 20th century, there have been alternative theories proposed on the origin of the name Mian Jo Goth. Several hypotheses have been advanced focusing on its linguistic roots which however remain uncertain. Mian Sahib was previous known by the name of Pat'a ("Dunes of Sand") until the 20th century. The origins of the city's current identification is unclear. In one legend, Sultan Bahoo's Third Trusste writes in his Book The "Munqaib-e-Sultani", that the Central Asian Sufi mystic Hazrat Faqir Mian Taj Muhammad Mahar from Iran, arrived at Pat'a and cultivated the lands and build the foundation of the City that made people recognize his name and then started calling the city "Mian Jo Goth".

Contemporary writer and descendant of Mian Taj Muhammad, Faqir Mian Ali Raza, mentions in his book Manaqib Pat'a Dhani that the ancient known name of the city was Mian Jo Goth; "Mian" (Note: This hypothesis may originate from the Sindhi and Punjabi. However, it is believed that the word "Mian" descends from the Punjabi word Miān 'Land Lord' was the name of the tribe that inhabited the region and city.) was the name of tribe that inhabited the region and city.

According to historical records, A Sufi saint named Mian Akhond Khair Muhammad Panhyar who was an Islamic scholar he started teaching at Pat'a Dhani later than people started referring the village as "Mian Jo Goth" by his title.

In another version of then legend, Mian Jo Goth was known by his villagers who were Mian's.

In 1978 Pakistan Government officially declared the Official Standard geographic Name as "Miān Sāhib" approved by the United States board on geographic names.

== Geography ==
=== Topography ===
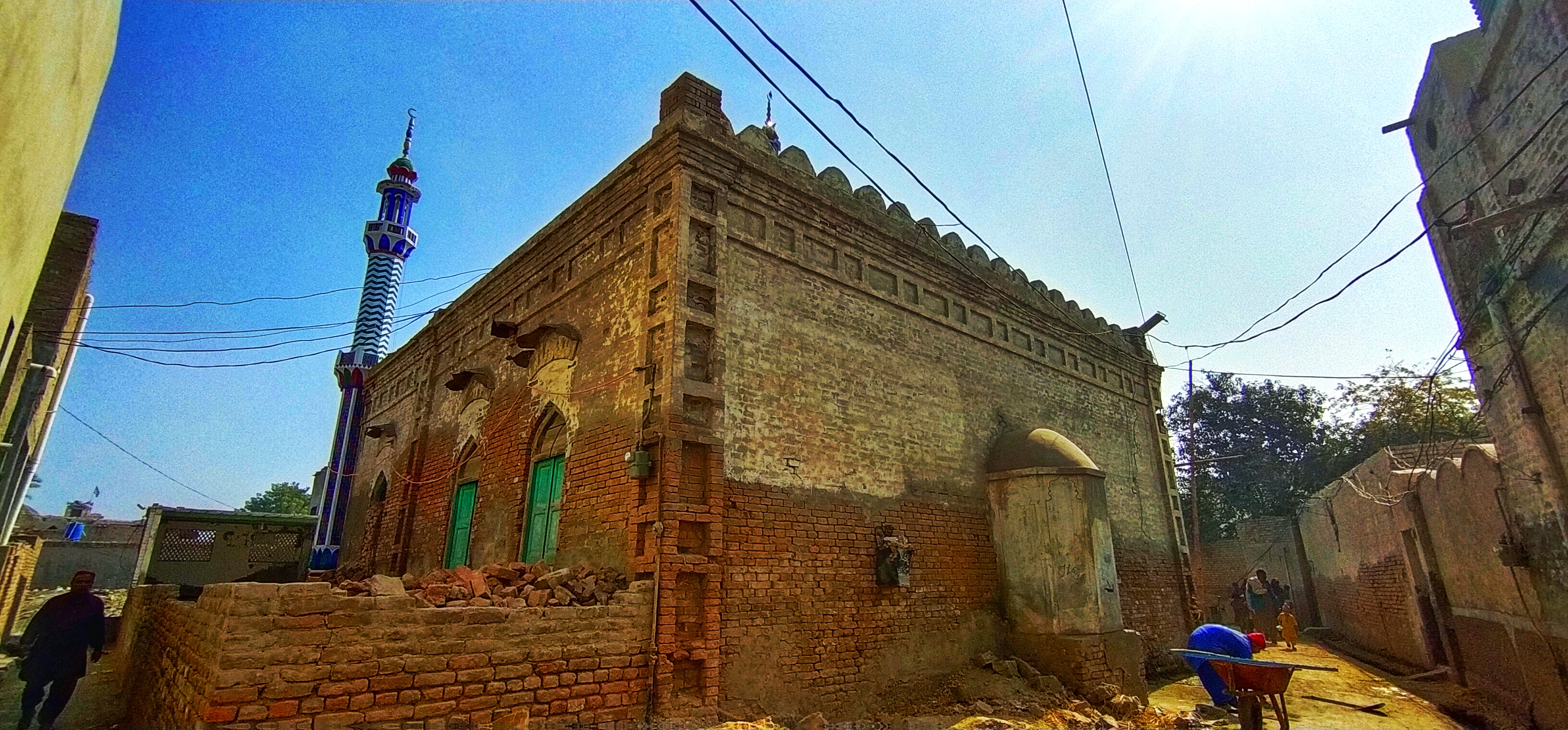
Mian Sahib is home to a Great Mosques. Pictured is the Sultania Masjid Shah of Mian Taj Muhammad .

Mian Sahib is located in Shikarpur district of Sindh, and covers an area of 7 square kilometres (2.7 sq mi). The nearest major cities are Mubarakpur, Jacobabad and Phoolan. Mian Sahib is located near a bank Coming from the Indus named "Begari Canal" The Bank separates the city from Mubarakpur and the District Jacobabad Bank works as border between Mubarakpur And Mian Sahib. The area around the city is a flat, alluvial plain that is used for agriculture and fish farms.

=== Cityscape ===
Social structures in Mian Sahib historic core centre around neighbourhoods, each known as a Mohallah.

Tanwri Mohallah, Panhyar Mohallah, Mahar Mohallah, Soomro Mohallah, Shiekh Mohallah, Channa Mohallah, Punjabi Mohalla, Syed Mohallah and some others are the main neighborhoods of the city. Each neighbourhood is served by a nearby bazaar and mosque, which in turn serve as a place where people can gather for trade and manufacturing. Each Mohallah has narrow gallies, and the grouping of houses around short lanes and cul-de-sacs lends a sense of privacy and security to residents of each neighbourhood. Major intersections in the neighbourhood are each referred to as a chowk, Wado Hotel, Nako

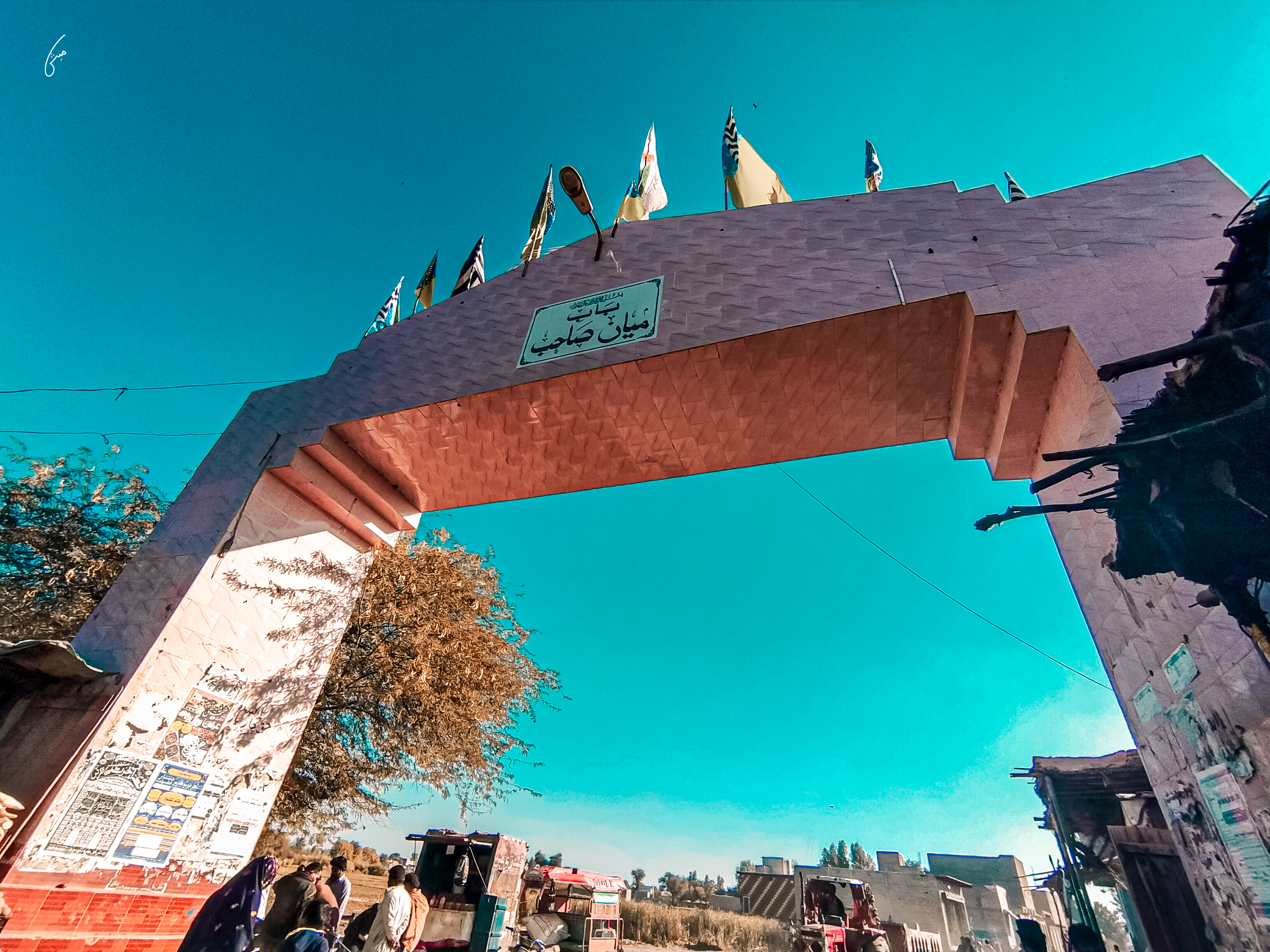
One of main chowks of Mian Sahib. Pictured is the Nako Gate "Bab-e-Mian Sahib".

Anwar Chowk, Taroo Chowk and Karpoo, chowks are the major chowks of the city.

=== Climate ===
Mian Sahib features a hot desert climate (Köppen climate classification BWh) with extremely hot summers and mild winters. The normal annual precipitation measures 186 millimetres (7.3 in).

=== Flood ===
In 2010, the super flood passed by the village, flood occurred damage to the city's graveyard and road which is linked to sultan kot from Mian Sahib.

=== Locusts ===
In 2020, Locust swarms appeared in the region, devoured the farmers crops and caused a huge loss for peasants.

Caused damage to standing crops and green vegetables, including fruits in Mian Sahib.

== Demographics ==
=== Crime ===
Crime in Mian Sahib, is concentrated in areas associated with poverty, drug abuse, and gangs.

The more affluent neighborhoods of center Mian Sahib are typically safe, especially in areas with concentrations of government operations, such as Main Street, Channa Mohallah, Mahar Mohallah and Punjabi Mohallah, but reports of violent crime increase in poorer neighborhoods generally concentrated in the eastern portion of the city.

In 2022, past five years murders continued on an upward trend, totaling 26, a significant rise from previous lows. In 2012, Mian Sahib's annual murder count had dropped to 2, the lowest total since 2002. Mian Sahib was once described as the "murderless" of the region.

== Education ==
The education system is well developed with primary and elementary schools separate for boys and girls and well managed staff.

- Government Boys High School Mian Sahib
- Government Girls High School Mian Sahib
- Government Boys Primary School Mian Sahib
- Government Girls High School Mian Sahib
- Government Urdu School Mian Sahib
- Ever Shine Public School Mian Sahib (Co-education)
- Al-Taj Ocean Middle Public School Mian Sahib (Co-education)

Every year popular activities for instance sports, scouts, art, theater, music, and community service. Many children also join school-affiliated organizations like student council, competitive academic clubs (like Model U.N. or math club), and affinity groups that help connect kids with shared identities Owing to this, students who are far from the town Mian Sahib have to travel far from their village to the town, because the nearby areas are still not developed, schools for acquiring education. The literacy ratio is about 50% and improvement in this direction is still in process .

== Sindhu Magazine ==
Sindhu Magazine was published in 1932 to 1936 from the village Mian-Jo-Goth. The magazine contained information about past accidents and historical events of Sindh and for the village. The editor of Sindhu Magazine was Boolchand Vasoomal Raajpaal, who was also born in this village.

== Saints Of Mian Sahib ==
Mian Sahib is home to many sites of seminal religious importance for the three major saints.

- Awwliyā Hazrat Sufi Faqir Mian Taj Muhammad Mahar Faqeeer Rahmatullah Alaih (b.1742 - 1851)

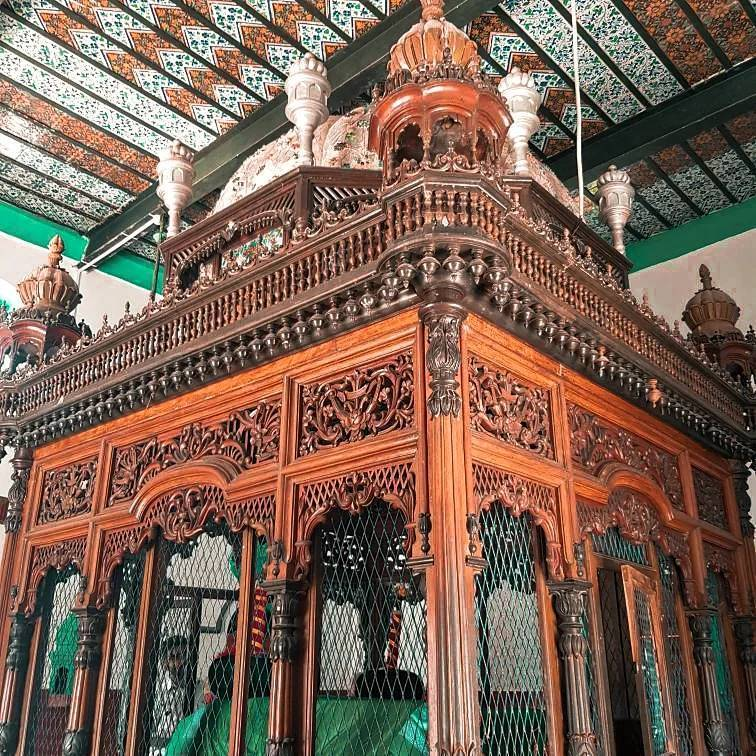
The Mausoleum Of Mian Taj Muhammad Mahar Faiqr in Mian Sahib.

- Hazrat Mian Akhond Khair Muhammad Panhyar (r.a)
- Hazart Faqir Mohsan Shah Bukhari (r.a)

Religions in Mian Sahib<"Religions: Islam 99%, other (Hindu 0.95% ) Atheism 0.04%".
Religions	Percent
Islam	99%
Hinduism	0.95%
Atheism	0.4%
Buddhism	0.1%

== Architecture ==
A number of historically and architecturally significant havelis survive in Mian Sahib. The most significant Haveli of Seths, dates from the Hindu era of the mid-18th century, and is considered to be one of the finest examples of architecture in Mian Sahib. It is the only haveli that preserves its original ornamentation and architecture.

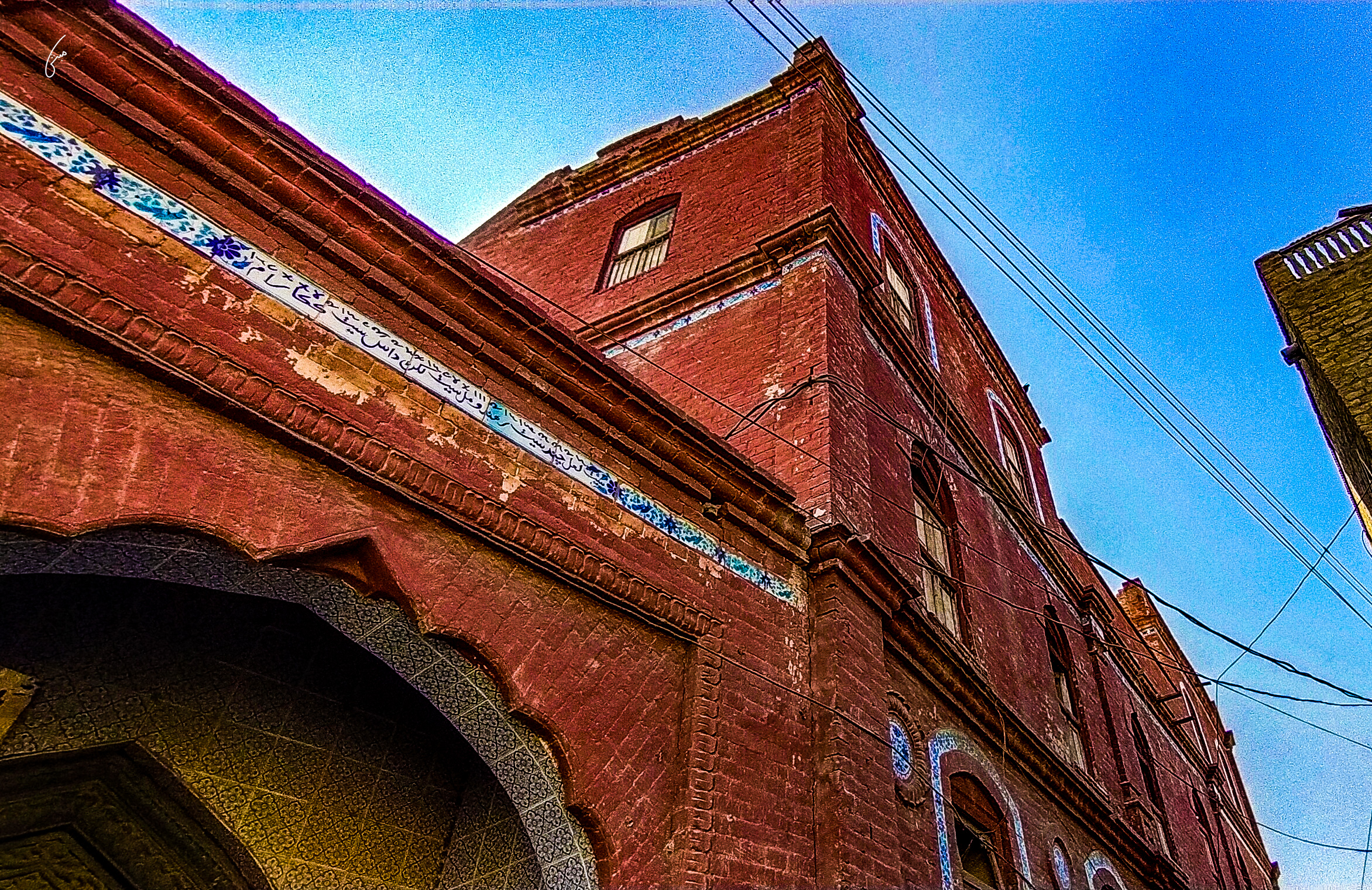
The Ghari Haveli in Mian Sahib Haveli Of Seths, which is now Primary Boys School.

The Gharhi haveli was built by Seth Laal Chand, Seth Randhuwamal, Seth Lakhaan'Das and Seth Kaka Ram in 1835. Inscriptions on the outer ramparts of the fort date it to the eighteenth century. The building of seths and was constructed with reddish-coloured chunar with bricks and sandstone . It is built in typical Mughal style of architecture. The Haveli has been built on high ground, which is above the flood level. The fort has carved balcony, open courtyard and pavilions. An inscription on the Haveli wall attests "House of the Rajah Seths".

== Administration ==
Mian Sahib is 12 Union Council of tehsil khanpur, Sindh, it has 4 wards

=== Chairman ===
Mian Abdul Manan Panhyar | Pakistan Peoples Party

=== Vice-chairman ===
Amjad Ali Tanwari

=== District Council member ===
Mian Shazaib Ali Panhyar

=== Wards ===
- Ward No. 1 | General Member : Shahdat Ali |Independent
- Ward No. 2 | General Member : Arbello Mangi |Independent
- Ward No. 3 | General Member : Shabir Dio |Pakistan Peoples Party
- Ward No. 4 | General Member : Bashir Ahmed |Pakistan Peoples Party

== See also ==
- Thul
- Shikarpur, Sindh
- Jacobabad

== Neighbors ==
- Mubarakpur, Jacobabad
- Phoolan, Sindh
- Thul
- Sultan Kot
