= PS-9 Shikarpur-III =

Constituency of the Provincial Assembly of Sindh, Pakistan

- Constituency for the Provincial Assembly of Sindh
- Region: Garhi Yasin Tehsil, Shikarpur Tehsil (partly) and Lakhi Tehsil (partly) of Shikarpur District
- Electorate: 263,681

Current constituency
- Party: Pakistan People's Party
- Member: Agha Shahbaz Ali Durrani
- Created from: PS-9 Shikarpur-I

PS-9 Shikarpur-III (پی ایس-9، شكارپور-3) is a constituency of the Provincial Assembly of Sindh.

== By-election 2025 ==
A by-election was held on 14 December 2025 due to the death of Agha Siraj Durrani, the previous member from this seat. Agha Shahbaz Ali Durrani, his son, won the by-election with 73,954 votes.

== General elections 2024 ==
Provincial election 2024: PS-9 Shikarpur-III
Party	Candidate	Votes	%	±%
PPP	Agha Siraj Khan Durrani	63,760	64.86	
JUI (F)	Rushdullah Shah	25,634	26.07	
TLP	Chakar Khan	2,697	2.74	
PML(N)	Muhammad Umar	2,422	2.46	
JI	Sarfaraz Ahmed	2,224	2.26	
Others	Others (five candidates)	1,574	1.61	
Turnout		102,944	39.04	
Total valid votes		98,311	95.50	
Rejected ballots		4,633	4.50	
Majority		38,126	38.79	
Registered electors		263,682		

== General elections 2018 ==
Contesting candidates	Party affiliation	Votes polled

== General elections 2013 ==
Contesting candidates	Party affiliation	Votes polled

== General elections 2008 ==
Contesting candidates	Party affiliation	Votes polled

== See also ==
- PS-8 Shikarpur-II
- PS-10 Larkana-I
