= Jaggan =

Jaggan may refer to:

- Jaggan, Pakistan, a village in Sindh, Pakistan
- Jaggan, Queensland, a locality in the Tablelands Region, Queensland, Australia
