= Agha Siraj Durrani =

Pakistani politician (1953–2025)

- آغا سراج دراني

Speaker of the Provincial Assembly of Sindh
- In office 31 May 2013 – February 2024
- Deputy: Shehla Raza (2013–2018); Rehana Leghari
- Preceded by: Nisar Khuhro
- Succeeded by: Awais Qadir Shah

Governor of Sindh
- Acting
- In office 8 March 2022 – 9 October 2022
- President: Arif Alvi
- Prime Minister: Shehbaz Sharif
- Preceded by: Imran Ismail
- Succeeded by: Kamran Tessori
- In office 3 August 2018 – 27 August 2018
- President: Mamnoon Hussain
- Prime Minister: Nasirul Mulk; Imran Khan
- Preceded by: Muhammad Zubair Umar
- Succeeded by: Imran Ismail
- In office 11 January 2017 – 2 February 2017
- President: Mamnoon Hussain
- Prime Minister: Nawaz Sharif
- Preceded by: Saeeduzzaman Siddiqui
- Succeeded by: Mohammad Zubair Umar

Member of the Provincial Assembly of Sindh
- In office 29 February 2024 – 15 October 2025
- Constituency: PS-9 Shikarpur-III
- In office 13 August 2018 – 11 August 2023
- Constituency: PS-9 Shikarpur-III
- In office 27 May 2013 – 28 May 2018
- Constituency: PS-9 Shikarpur-I

Personal details
- Born: 5 October 1953 Shikarpur, Sindh, Pakistan
- Died: 15 October 2025 (aged 72) Karachi, Sindh, Pakistan
- Party: PPP (1985–2025)

Muhammad Agha Siraj Khan-Durrani Barakzai (Sindhi: محمد آغا سراج خان دراني بارڪزئي;Urdu: محمد آغا سراج خان درانی بارکزئی; 5 October 1953 – 15 October 2025) was a Pakistani politician who served as Speaker of the Provincial Assembly of Sindh from 2013 until 2024.

Durrani was the 12th Speaker of the Provincial Assembly of Sindh.

== Early life and education ==
Durrani was born on 5 October 1953 in Shikarpur.In a Sindhi Family Hailing from Garhi Yasin, his father Agha Sadaruddin and uncle Agha Badruddin also served as speakers of the same assembly.

He matriculated from the St Patrick's High School in Karachi in 1971, followed by a bachelor of commerce. He also pursued an LLB degree at the Sindh Muslim Law College.

During the 1980s, he left for the United States where he ran a hardware business.

== Political career ==
Durrani first contested elections in 1985 during the Zia regime, in which he lost. He joined the Pakistan Peoples Party and secured a victory in 1988 elections. He was a confidante of PPP chairman Asif Ali Zardari. In 1990, during Nawaz Sharif government he was imprisoned for some time for embezzlement charges.

== Illness and death ==
In later life, Durrani suffered from prolonged health issues. He was moved to a private hospital in Karachi when his condition worsened a month before his death. He died on 15 October 2025, at the age of 72.
