= Clock Tower, Shikarpur =

- گھنٹہ گھر، شکارپور
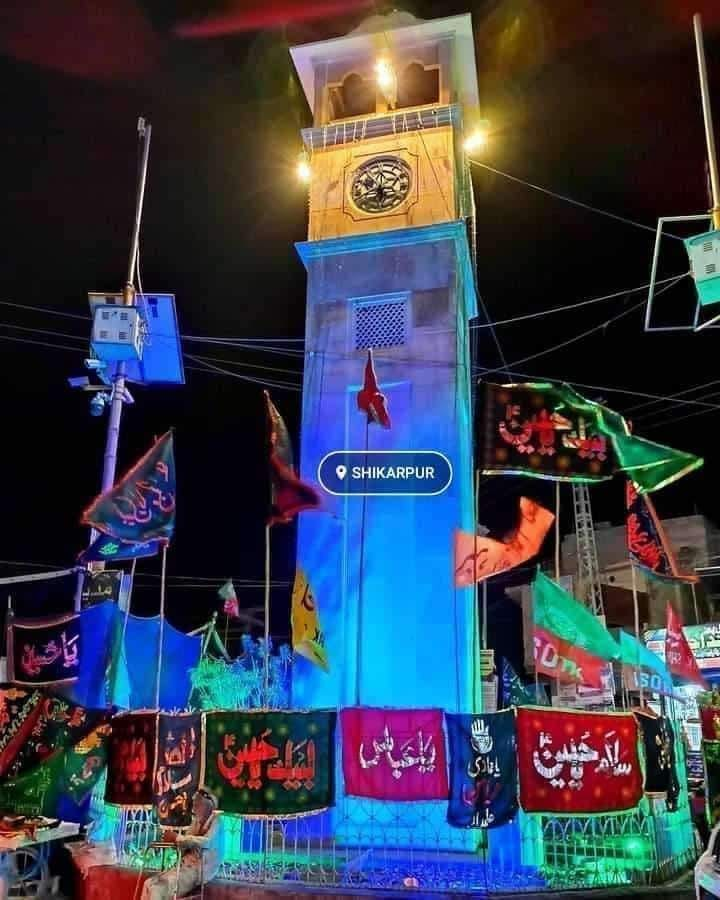
- Interactive map of the Clock Tower, Shikarpur area
- Alternative names: Ghanta Ghar

General information
- Type: Clock tower
- Location: Shikarpur, Sindh, Pakistan
- Coordinates: 27°57′03″N 68°38′09″E
- Opened: 1935
- Cost: Rs 5000

The Clock Tower, Shikarpur (Urdu: گھنٹہ گھر، شکارپور), also known as Ghanta Ghar, is a landmark situated in the city center of Shikarpur, Sindh.

== History ==
Constructed in 1935, the clock tower was built in memory of Seth Heranand Nandhiram Bajaj by his sons, Seth Kunia Lal Bajaj and Seth Raja Ram Bajaj. A distinctive stone from Jaipur, Rajasthan, commemorating the inauguration, is placed at the base of the tower.

The construction of the tower coincided with the silver jubilee of George Frederick Ernest Albert V, Emperor of India, and began on May 6. The project, funded with a donation of Rs 5000 from the Bajaj family, was overseen by the municipal committee of Shikarpur, with K.V. Joshi as the chief officer and H.N. Meensis as the administrator.
