= Humayooni =

19th and 20th-century Islamic scholar, poet and author

- Born: Abdul Ghafoor Pechuho; 1845; Humaayoon, Sindh, British India
- Died: 20 June 1918 (aged 72–73); Humaayoon, Sindh, British India
- Venerated in: Islam
- Major shrine: Dargah Hamayoon Sharif, Shikarpur, Sindh
- Feast: 11 Ramadan
- Tradition or genre: Sufism and mysticism

Abdul Ghafoor Pechuho, better known as Humayooni and Muftoon Humayooni, was an Islamic scholar, saint and poet. A disciple, and student of his father Muhammad Yaqoob, he belonged to the Qadiri Sufi order, and started a mystic tradition in Greater Sindh. Much of what is known about his life is through Sufi tradition, and separating it from historical reality is difficult.

== Hamaayooni's works ==
Humayooni wrote many books such as Fatwaa-e-Humayooni, Deewane Maftoon, Frahang-e-Humayooni and others. Humayooni had command over Sindhi, Persian and Arabic, and taught these languages to his disciples. Besides that he was a poet and his book of poetry is known as Dewan-e-Maftoon.

Tuhnje Zulf Je Band Kamanda Widha, Zindan Hazarain Maa Na Rogo
Tuhnje Shahi Dastar Khwan Mathe, Mehman Hazarain Maa Na Rogo
Tuhnje Jalwa Jamal Je Ishwagiri, Kaya Mulka Mutiya Wasiya Wari
Cha Jina Malaika Hoora Pari, Ghilmana Hazarain Maa Na Rogo
Kiyen Abru Taigha Shaheed Kaya, Keyen Naza Mazeeda Mureeda Kaya
Re Narain Deeda Khareeda Kaya, Sultana Hazarain Maa Na Rogo
Aye Maha Laka Mehbooba Mitha, Tuhnje Nazo Ada Tan Jana Fida
Thiya Damangir Ameera Gada, Heran Hazarain Maa Na Rogo
Kaye Ghayal Tuhnje Ghoora Sanda, Makhmur Ghafoora Saroora Sanda
Tuhnje Noora Maoora Zahoora Sanda, Nigrana Hazarain Maa Na Rogo

— "Muftoon Humayooni, Affection of Yours

== Death ==
He died on 20 June 1918.

== Urs ==
Disciples celebrate his urs every year on 11 Ramadan.
