= Wahid Bakhsh Bhayo =

Pakistani politician

Sardar Wahid Bakhsh Bhayo و١حد بخش
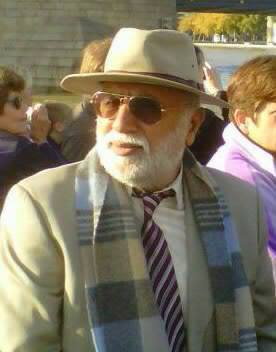
- Sardar Bhayo In London

Personal details
- Born: 15 October 1954 Jaggan, Sindh, Pakistan
- Died: 13 December 2018 (aged 64)
- Party: Pakistan Peoples Party, Pakistan Muslim League, Sindh National Front
- Education: Bachelor of Business Administration
- Alma mater: University of Maryland, College Park
- Known for: Politics, Family Name, Tribe Leader

Sardar Wahid Bakhsh Bhayo (Urdu:و١حد بخش) (born Wahid Bakhsh Bhayo; 15 October 1954, died 13 December 2018) was a Pakistani politician. He was a member of the Central Executive Committee of the Pakistan Peoples Party and a former member of the Provincial Assembly of Sindh and he was the tribal head of the Bhayo tribe.
