= Khialdas Fani =

Indian Sindhi language writer (1914-1995)

- Born: 4 April 1914; Mian Jo Goth, Bombay Presidency, British India
- Died: 8 April 1995 (aged 81); India
- Occupations: Writer, poet, dramatist, educator

Khialdas Fani (4 April 1914 – 8 April 1995) was an Indian writer, poet, stage artist, and singer renowned for his contributions to Sindhi literature. He held the position of vice-chairman at the Madhya Pradesh Sindhi Sahitya Academy.

== Biography ==
Khialdas was born on 4 April 1914 in Mian Jo Goth, near Shikarpur, Sindh (now in Pakistan). His father's name was Valiram Begwani. He attended a school in his village and later pursued further education in Shikarpur.

In India, he served as professor at Bhopal College and retired in 1973. In recognition of his contributions to education and literature, the Bhopal Government appointed him as the lifetime principal of the college. During his time in Bhopal, Fani held several prominent roles, including serving as the convener of the textbook committee, vice-president of the Provincial Academy, and a member of the Central Literary Academy.

Additionally, he served as the chairman of the Bhopal Kalamandal (theater/stage drama) for 35 years. He was also an approved PhD supervisor at the Bombay University.

== Literary contributions ==
At the time of his birth, Shikarpur was a hub of literary activities and gatherings. Many renowned poets, including Agha Ghulam Nabi Sufi, Faqir Ghulam Ali Masroor, Lutufullah Jogi, and Saz Ali Saz, used to participate in these gatherings. The young Fani found great inspiration in the poetry of Agha Ghulam Nabi Sufi and began composing his own poems under Sufi's guidance. It was likely in the year 1929 when Fani presented his first poem in a literary gathering in Shikarpur.

Fani is widely regarded as one of the finest Sindhi language poets, both in Sindh, Pakistan and India. He composed verses in various forms, including Geet, Kafi, Baita, Panjkada, Ghazal and Rubai, among others. His poetry encompassed themes like the omnipotence of the Creator, the beauty of nature, tender human emotions, and the realities of modern life.

After the partition of India, the poems he composed reflected his fond memories of the cherished days spent in his birthplace in Sindh. Fani's poems not only contain profound thoughts but also showcase his adeptness in selecting appropriate words and forms. The rhythmic quality of his poems might be attributed to his skill as a skilled singer and musician.

== Books ==
- Radio Raag (Radio Songs), 1949
- Samoondee Laharoon (Waves of Ocean), poetry, 1951
- Sik, Soz Ain Saaz (Longing, Grief & Musical Instrument), poetry, 1983
- Khizaan-Jee-Khushboo Peela Pann (Fragrance of Autumn – Yellow Leaves), poetry, 1994
- Makti Marag
- Pachhtau Ja Gorha
- Samund Samayo Boonda Men

== Kalakar Mandal ==
Fani established the Kalakar Mandal in Bhopal, a vibrant theater group. Under this platform, he produced numerous stage dramas, introducing and nurturing several talented young stage actors and actresses. He specifically encouraged Sindhi-speaking girls to showcase their talent. Some of his renowned dramas are listed below:

- Qismat Jo Khel
- Wirhasat
- Shal Dheear Na Jaman
- Ahsas Jo Aaeenu
- Karni Bharni

Fani wrote lyrics for the first Sindhi film Ekta which was released in 1942.

== Awards and honours ==
He received several awards and honors during his career. However he has not left any record behind him except the following award for his poetry collection Sik, Soz Ain Saaz (at New Delhi by Central Hindi Directorate, Govt. of India).

== Death ==
Khialdas Fani died on April 8, 1995, in India.
