= Ghos Bakhsh Khan Mahar =

Pakistani politician

- غوث بخش خان مھر

Member of the National Assembly of Pakistan
- In office 13 August 2018 – 10 August 2023
- Constituency: NA-199 (Shikarpur-II)
- In office 18 November 2002 – 31 May 2018
- Constituency: NA-203 (Shikarpur-cum-Sukkur-cum-Larkana)

Personal details
- Born: 27 October 1945 (age 80) Shikarpur, Sindh, Pakistan
- Party: PPP (2023-present)
- Other political affiliations: GDA (2018-2023); PML(Q) (2002-2013)
- Children: Muhammad Shaharyar Khan Mahar

Ghos Bakhsh Khan Mahar (Sindhi: غوث بخش خان مھر; Urdu: غوث بخش خان مہر; born 27 October 1945) is a Pakistani politician who had been a member of the National Assembly of Pakistan from August 2018 till August 2023. Previously he was a member of the National Assembly from 2002 to May 2018.

== Early life ==
He was born on 27 October 1945.

== Political career ==
He was a member of the Provincial Assembly of Sindh from Constituency PS-7 (Sukkur) from March 1977 to July 1977.

He was elected to the National Assembly of Pakistan as a candidate of Pakistan Muslim League (Q) (PML-Q) from Constituency NA-203 (Shikarpur-II) in the 2002 Pakistani general election. He received 61,432 votes and defeated Agha Arsalan Khan, a candidate of Pakistan Peoples Party (PPP). In the same election, he was re-elected to the Provincial Assembly of Sindh as a candidate of PML-Q from Constituency PS-10 (Shikarpur -II). He received 38,321 votes and defeated Shabir Khan Mahar, a candidate of PPP.

He was re-elected to the National Assembly as a candidate of PML-Q from Constituency NA-203 (Shikarpur-cum-Sukkur-cum-Larkana) in the 2008 Pakistani general election. He received 89,921 votes and defeated Sardar Wahid Bux Bhayo, a candidate of PPP.

He was re-elected to the National Assembly as a candidate of Pakistan Muslim League (F) (PML-F) from Constituency NA-203 (Shikarpur-cum-Sukkur-cum-Larkana) in the 2013 Pakistani general election. He received 77,065 votes and defeated Sardar Wahid Bux Bhayo, a candidate of PPP.

He was re-elected to the National Assembly as a candidate of Grand Democratic Alliance (GDA) from Constituency NA-199 (Shikarpur-II) in the 2018 Pakistani general election.
