= Mubarakpur, Jacobabad =

Place in Sindh, Pakistan

Mubarakpur
- Town
- Mubarak pur (Mubarak pur)
- Location within Sindh Location within Pakistan Location within Asia Location within Earth
- Coordinates: 28°10′7″N 68°38′18″E
- Country: Pakistan
- Province: Sindh
- District: Jacobabad

Government
  - Chairman: Saifullah Khan Mahar Vice Chairman Junaid Ahmed Bhutto
- Elevation: 46 m (151 ft)

Population (15000)
  - Total: 7,680
- Time zone: UTC+5 (PST)

Mubarakpur is a town in the Jacobabad District in Sindh province of Pakistan. It is near Right bank of Begari Canal and Thul in Sindh province of Pakistan. It is located at 28° 10' 8.4972" N 68° 38' 18.2148" E with an altitude of 47 metres.

There are three Govt Schools and one privately managed School,two petrol pumps , one BHU , two Dairy Farm two fish ponds in the village. 75% of the population lives on agriculture and self-employment and 25% or less are in government jobs.

Government Schools :

1: Govt Higher Secondary School , its Principal is Prof Ayaz Ahmed Bhutto .

2 : Govt Girls High School , Its H.M is Mrs Noonari

3:Govt Primary School , Its H.M is Mr Nazakat Ali Bhutto

4: SSBQAA Institute , Privately Managed School. Its owner is Prof Qudratullah Bhutto . Petrol Pumps :

1: SSBQAA Petroleum Service , its owner is Prof Qudratullah Bhutto

2: Junaid Filling Station , its owner is Mr Yasin Ahmed Mahar

ICE FACTORY : There is the facility of a Mini Ice Factory in the Mubarakpur managed by Prof Qudtatullah Bhutto

== See also ==
- Thul
- Shikarpur, Sindh
