= Khalid Mehmood Soomro =

Pakistani religious scholar and politician

- Born: 7 May 1959
- Died: 29 November 2014 (aged 55); Sukkur, Pakistan
- Education: MBBS, postgraduate studies in Islamic culture, a degree from Al-Azhar University: Chandka Medical College; Sachal Sarmast Oriental College; International Islamic University, Islamabad; Al-Azhar University
- Occupations: Religious leader, politician, Doctor
- Organization: Al Mehmood Social Welfare Organization Pakistan
- Children: Rashid Mahmood Soomro; Nasir Mehmood Soomro

Khalid Mehmood Soomro (7 May 1959 – 29 November 2014) was a Pakistani physician, politician, and religious leader.

== Early life ==
He studied at Chandka Medical College and graduated with a degree of MBBS. He completed postgraduate studies in Islamic culture from Sachal Sarmast Oriental College Larkana, and completed his religious studies from the International Islamic University, Islamabad International Islamic University Islamabad, with distinction. Soomro obtained a degree from Al-Azhar University, Egypt, where he was a student of Gad al-Haq, the university Vice-Chancellor. His younger brother, Iqbal Soomro, discussed his studies at Al-Azhar University in a report published by Dawn.

== Career ==
His father was Maulana Ali Muhammad Haqqani, a religious scholar who founded the Ishaatul Quran madressah. belonged to an Islamic and Political Party called Jamiat Ulama-e-Islam Pakistan. In 1988, his political career started when he was chosen as Secretary General in Jamiat-Ulama e-Islam [Sindh]. On several occasions, he was a candidate for the Provincial and National Assembly.

He served as Senator of JUI-F from Sindh in Senate of Pakistan.

Soomro set up a welfare organization called Al Mehmood Social Welfare Organization Pakistan.

== Death ==
He was assassinated in Sukkur on 29 November 2014, at age 55. His funeral procession was attended by thousands of people.

== Bibliography ==
- K̲h̲ālid Maḥmūdu Joṇo, Shahīd-i Islām: ʻAllāmah Dạ̄kṭar K̲h̲ālid Maḥmūd Sūmro jī ḥālāta, k̲h̲ayālāta, afkār ain siyāsī, samājī k̲h̲idmatun tay tafṣīlī kitāb, Lārkāna: Maktabah-yi Abū K̲h̲ālid Shahīdu, 2018, 304 p. Essays on his life and political struggle.

== See also ==
- List of Deobandis
