= Jaggan, Pakistan =

جاگڻ
- Village
- Jagan
- Location within Sindh
- Coordinates: 28°05′07″N 68°29′45″E
- Country: Pakistan
- Province: Sindh
- Time zone: PST

Jaggan (Sindhi: جاڳڻ) is a village in Shikarpur Taluka in Shikarpur District (a famous district in Sindh province) Pakistan.

According to some sources the population of village estimates 8000. It is connected with Sukkur-Jacobabad highway, Sultan Kot and Ramzanpur.
