= Sultan Kot =

Town in Sindh, Pakistan

- Town
- Sultan kot
- Location in Sindh Sultan Kot (Pakistan) Sultan Kot (Asia) Sultan Kot (Earth)
- Coordinates: 28°4′15″N 68°35′40″E
- Country: Pakistan
- Province: Sindh
- District: Shikarpur
- Elevation: 210 m (690 ft)

Population (2017)
  - City: 15,000
  - Estimate (2025): 25,000
- Time zone: UTC+05:00 (PST)
- Post code: 78100
- Calling code: 0726

Sultan Kot Sultān Kot) is a small town, it is situated in Shikarpur, Sindh, Pakistan, and its original name (with diacritics) is Sultān Kot. it has a Railway station named Sultan Kot railway station and Police Station. Sultan Kot is also linked to N-65 National Highway Via Shikarpur, Jacobabad. Sultan kot also have a branch of HBL Bank, connected to the N-65 National Highway. Sultan kot is historically famous because of its Agha Family (Babar Pathan) which has been the ruling family of the area for decades.

Babar’s are Pathans and the ancestor of the Babar tribe was born at Takht-e-Sulaiman in 1175; six generations after Qais Abdur Rashid. GUL MUHAMMAD KHAN BABAR: Gul Mohammad Khan Babar belonged to the Gora Khel sub-tribe and used to live in Kandahar. There, he was the chief of the Babar tribe and Member of the Loya Jirga in the era of Mir Wais Hotak. Gul Mohammad Khan Babar was also the Finance Minister in the reign of Ahmad Shah Durrani (AD 1737-1747). He is also remembered most for his participation in the Third Battle of Panipat against the Marathas. He was the father of Nur Muhammad Khan Babar and great grandfather of Sultan Muhammad Khan Babar. NUR MUHAMMAD KHAN BABAR: Gul Muhammad Khan babar’s son Nur Muhammad khan Babar was a famous personality of his time. He belonged to the Gora Khel sub-tribe and was also from Kandahar. he was appointed as Finance Minister in the reign of Timur Shah Durrani. He later on continued with the same post in Zaman Shah Durrani's time. He was also the father-in-law of Zaman Shah Durrani. Nur Mohammad Khan Babar served and helped his tribesmen in Shikarpur, Multan and Chaudhwan. Due to his efforts, the Babar tribe was exempted from taxes and compulsory recruitment in the army during the Durrani Empire. Sadly, in AD 1798, Nur Mohammad Khan Babar was murdered on the order of Zaman Shah Durrani, his own son-in-law and Shah of Afghanistan. Sultan Muhammad Khan Babar./Sultan Khan Sultan Muhammad Khan Babar also known as Sultan Khan was a Famous Personality of his time Sultan Mohammad Khan Babar belonged to the Gora Khel sub-tribe from Shikarpur. He was the grandson of Nur Mohammad Khan Babar. He was appointed as the Governor of Jalalabad in the era of Zaman Shah Durrani. He gave up his post and relocated to Shikarpur, upon the wish of his grandfather. Here, Sultan Mohammad Khan Babar purchased 50000 acres of land and also, a canal, from Dost Khan. He also bought 210 m of land outside of Shikarpur and there he built a village and named it Sultan Kot and he started to live there. Sultan Mohammad Khan Babar was also on really good terms with Shuja Shah Durrani since his daughter was married to Shuja Shah Durrani's son, Fateh Jung. Shuja Shah Durrani stayed at his settlement in Shikarpur for many months.he also help him in his last attempt for throne of Afghanistan in 1838. Sultan Mohammed Khan Babar was son of Behrose khan Babar governor of jalalabad in Tamoor Shah era. Sardar Sultan Khan had 2 sons the elder one was Sardar Muhammad Raheem Khan and the younger one was Arsula Khan. Famous Personalities of Sultan Kot are Sardar Sultan Muhammad Khan, Sardar Muhammad Raheem Khan, Arsala Khan, Sardar Abdul Kareem Khan, khan bahadur Shah Pasand Khan, Agha Dur Muhammad khan phatan, Agha khan Bahadur khan Muhammad khan phatan, Agha Muhammad nawaz khan phatan, Agha Lal bux Khan phatan, Agha Abdul hameed khan phtan, Khan Sahab Sardar Saifuddin Khan Pathan SIR Jan Muhammad Khan Pathan, Khan Bahadur Mir Ahmed Khan, Khan Bahadur Agha Nizamuddin Khan, Khan Sahib Agha Hisamuddin Khan, Agha dost Muhammed Khan, Sardar Ayoub Khan, Agha Shah Muhammed Khan, Sardar Sultan Khan II (Bhora Khan) Senator Agha Ghulam Nabi, MNA Major Atta Muhammad Khan, MPA Agha Tariq Khan, Agha fateh Muhammed Khan, Agha Sunny Khan, Agha Buxshall khan, MPA Agha taimoor khan phatan, Agha Jan Akhtar

== See also ==
- Mian Sahib
- Shikarpur, Sindh
- Jacobabad
