= Madeji =

Coordinates: 27°45′N 68°27′E

- Town
- Interactive map of Madeji
- Country: Pakistan
- Province: Sindh
- District: Shikarpur

Population (2023)
  - Total: 20,530

Madeji is a town in Garhi Yasin Tehsil of Shikarpur District in Sindh province of Pakistan. The town is situated in east, at a distance of 68 kilometers from World Heritage Site Moen-jo-Daro. The town market is considered as the central market for all nearby villages.

A grid station of 132KV was inaugurated in city on Tuesday, February 2, 2016.
