= Shikarpuri achar =

Shikarpuri achar (Sindhi: شڪارپوري آچار) is a variety of South Asian pickles in Shikarpur, Sindh. This achar is famous throughout Pakistan and it is exported to UAE, Saudi Arabia, UK and other countries. The most famous variety is the mixed achar containing turnip, carrots, garlic, chickpeas, mango, lime, green chilies and cauliflowers. Homemade achars of Shikarpur are also popular among the varieties.

Shikarpur city houses around 12 pickle manufacturing factories, which have networks of shops. Other small home-based manufacturers operate in the city.
