= Khanpur, Sindh =

Residential town in Sindh, Pakistan

Khanpur خانپور
- Tehsil
- Location in Sindh, Pakistan Khanpur (Pakistan)
- Coordinates: 28°00′05″N 68°43′44″E
- Country: Pakistan
- Province: Sindh
- Division: Larkana Division
- District: Shikarpur District

Population (2023)
  - Total: 18,052
- Time zone: UTC+5 (PKT)
- Postal code: 78150
- Calling code: 0726

Khanpur (Urdu: خانپور) is a small city and the Tehsil/Taluka of District Shikarpur, Larkana Division in the province of Sindh, Pakistan. The town has a population of 18,052 according to the 2023 Census of Pakistan.

It is located on the Indus Highway (N-55), approximately 9 kilometres from Shikarpur toward Kandhkot. The city is well known for its fertile agricultural lands producing rice, wheat, and various vegetables. Additionally, the tehsil includes kaccha (riverine) areas along the Indus River and hosts several oil and gas fields, PARCO pumping stations, and rice and flour mills.

Shikarpur District borders Jacobabad District and Kashmore District to the north and east, and Sukkur District to the south.

== Notable people ==
- Shah Pasand Shah Kazmi (1926 – 2019), a respected traditional healer and bone specialist known throughout Sindh for his bone recovery methods.
- Afzal Arain, local political and social activist.
- Muhammad Shah Kazmi, community reformer.
- Sayed Naimatullah shah

Syed Prof Dr Naimatullah shah son of syed sachal shah 1st PhD degree holder of khanpur studed from Brunel Unversity UK and become department chairman of sindh unversity and now is professor at Yamamah unversity Saudi Arabia.Naimatullah shah also top sceincetist. He is international topper sceincetist of sindh and pakistan

- Sayed Momin Ali Shah

Sayed Engr Momin ali shah son of haji Gul shah bukhari. Sayed Momin ali shah completed his education engineering from Mehran University and ME from imperial college London in 1975. 1st student of khanpur who going foreign for studies.and become federal Chief Engineer. He also Author,islamic scholar

- sayed Sadiq Ali Shah

Sayed sadiq ali shah son of bahar ali shah 3rd chairman of khanpur,Sayed sadiq ali shah Ex Director General of Balochistan AG office department also Honest officer of khanpur history

- sayed Ghulam Mehdi Shah

Sayed ghulam mehdi shah son of inayat ali shah,sayed ghulam mehdi shah completed his education from Lincoln unversity in education And became Sindh Education officer and professor on khairpur University shah sahab honest personality and lover of Albait and panjtant pak

- Sayed Ghulam Qurban Shan

Sayed Qurban shah son of bahar ali shah 3rd chairman of khanpur,he completed his education from Engineering University and Going in Creek for ME degree become TOP engineer

== Culture and society ==
in 1892 The population, numbering 2733,comprises 1820 musalmans ,principally of the Sayed bukhari, Bapar , Sethar, Chakki , and Khatri soomros tribes,and 913 hindus of the lohano castes. Khanpur's residents speak Sindhi as their primary language. The town has several schools, mosques, and small markets. Agriculture remains the main source of income for most families.There are some renowned casts here which are : Bukhari sayeds one of the ancient Caste in khanpur he come in 1681 and other dynasty in 1554,khanpuri Bukhari sayeds are 4dynasty and 2 khandan 1:Khalilzai sayeds 1681 Ad 2:Ameerana sayeds 1554 Ad 3:Aqeelzai sayeds 19 century 4:sindhi sayeds 19 century 5:Ghosriji sayeds 1950s 6:Bahar shah pir sayeds 1950s
