= Bhayo (tribe) =

Sindhi tribe

ڀيو

Regions with significant populations
- Sindh, Balochistan, Punjab

Languages
- Sindhi

Religion
- Islam

Bhayo (Sindhi: ڀيو) also called Bhaya is a Sindhi Sammat tribe found in Northern Sindh (Uttrad), Balochistan and Punjab provinces of Pakistan.

In Jacobabad and Kandhkot Bhayas are influential Zamindars, they are mainly agriculturists. Babal Khan Bhayo is the present chief of the Bhayo tribe.

== Origin ==
There are different theories about their origins, according to one theory they are Rathores, but that's not believed by the Bhayas themselves. Another theory is Bhayo was a son of Unar of the Samma tribe.

== Clans ==
Bhaikhanani, Bilalani, Goharani, Hajani, Haslani, Khakani, Khattiyan, Maqsoodani, Malokani etc.
