= Garhi Yasin Tehsil =

Garhi Yasin Taluka تعلقہ گڑھی یاسین ڳڙهي ياسين تعلقو
- Taluka (Tehsil)
- Country: Pakistan
- Province: Sindh
- District: Shikarpur District
- Time zone: UTC+5 (PST)
- Number of towns: 3
- Number of Union Councils: 12

Garhi Yasin is an administrative subdivision (Tehsil) of Shikarpur District, Sindh Pakistan. Madeji and Dakhan are two big town beside Garhi Yasin itself in taluka.
