= Channa Mohallah, Jacobabad =

Town in Sindh, Pakistan

Channa Mohallah is a town in Jacobabad in Sindh, Pakistan. Most residents in Channa mohallah belong to the Channa (tribe). 50% and most of the population of Channa tribe; and it is the most popular area of Jacobabad that is known as Channa village. The main places of Jacobabad also in Channa Mohallah the power grid station and Shah Abdul Latif Bhitai Stadium Ground. Shahbaz Air Base. Now there is a USAID funded Hospital J.I.M.S: Jacobabad institute of Medical Sciences. Also located in Channa Mohallah this area major of jacobabad city sindh Pakistan
