= Rashid Mahmood Soomro =

Pakistani politician

- راشد محمود سومرو

General Secretary of JUI (F) Sindh
- Incumbent
- Assumed office 11 January 2015

President of PDM Sindh
- In office September 2020 – September 2023

Vice Chancellor (نائب مہتمم), Jamia Islamia Larkana
- Incumbent
- Assumed office November 2014

Personal details
- Born: Larkana, Sindh, Pakistan
- Party: JUI (F) (2015-present)
- Relations: Nasir Mahmood Soomro (Brother)
- Parent: Khalid Mehmood Soomro
- Education: Dawrah Al-Hadith; M.A. in Islamiat; M.A. in Political Science
- Alma mater: Jamia Binoria Al-Almia Karachi; Shah Abdul Latif University Khairpur

Rashid Mehmood Soomro is a Pakistani politician who is currently serving as Secretary General of JUI (F) Sindh. He is also known for his leadership role in the Pakistan Democratic Movement (PDM) in Sindh. He is the son of Khalid Mahmood Soomro.

== Early life and family background ==
Rashid Mahmood Soomro was born in Larkana His father, Khalid Mehmood Soomro, was a doctor and religious scholar with postgraduate studies in Islamic culture from Sachal Sarmast Oriental College and a degree from Al-Azhar University in Egypt. He was the general secretary of JUI-F's Sindh chapter from 1988 until his death and also served as a Senator from 2006 to 2012. Rashid Mahmood Soomro received his early education in Larkana before moving to Karachi for higher religious education, where he completed his Dawrah Al-Hadith at Jamia Binoria Al-Almia. Concurrently, he also completed his M.A. in Islamic Studies and M.A. in Political Science from Shah Abdul Latif University Khairpur. After completing his education, he became active in local politics, serving first as the Ameer (President) of Tehsil Larkana and then as the Ameer (President) of District Larkana. Alongside his political work, he also assisted his father in managing the madrasah founded by his maternal grandfather.

The Soomro family's political activism dates back further, with Khalid Mahmood Soomro having been a participant in the Movement for the Restoration of Democracy (MRD) in 1983, a movement against the military regime of General Zia-ul-Haq. Rashid Mahmood Soomro's birth coincided with his father's imprisonment for his political activities. This family history of resistance and political engagement has shaped Rashid Mahmood Soomro's own career. Following his father's assassination on 29 November 2014, Rashid Mahmood Soomro took on the mantle of leadership within the JUI-F. He has since been a vocal advocate for justice in his father's murder case, often criticizing the slow pace and alleged lack of progress.

== Political career and key positions ==
After the death of his father, the party's general council elected him as the Secretary-General of Jamiat Ulema-e-Islam Sindh. Since then, he has been re-elected as the Secretary-General in every intra-party election. Soomro also held important positions in the JUI (F) as he was the Chief Election Commissioner of the party from 2017 to 2023. He has also been the president of PDM in Sindh. Rashid Mahmood Soomro's political journey has been defined by his rise within the JUI-F and his confrontational stance against his opponents.

=== Jamiat Ulema-e-Islam (F) ===
As the Secretary General of the JUI-F Sindh chapter, Soomro is responsible for leading the party's activities and strategy in the province. He has been instrumental in mobilizing the party's supporters and has used his platform to address a wide range of issues affecting Sindh and Pakistan. The JUI-F is known for its strong street presence and its ability to rally large crowds, and Soomro has often been at the forefront of these protests.

=== Pakistan Democratic Movement (PDM) ===
Soomro also played a significant role in the Pakistan Democratic Movement (PDM), an alliance of opposition parties formed in 2020 to challenge the government of then-Prime Minister Imran Khan. He served as the president of the PDM's Sindh chapter, highlighting his importance not just within his own party but also within the broader opposition landscape. The PDM successfully brought about a vote of no-confidence against Imran Khan in April 2022, leading to his removal from office.

=== Participation in Elections ===
In the 2018 election, Soomro contested from his native constituency, NA-200 Larkana, on an MMA ticket against the Pakistan Peoples Party Chairman Bilawal Bhutto Zardari, securing 50,200 votes. Ahead of the 2024 general elections, Rashid Mahmood Soomro ran against PPP Chairman Bilawal Bhutto Zardari for the NA 194 Larkana seat, in addition to contesting from NA 193 Shikarpur. He secured over 35,000 votes in the election against Bilawal. Soomro claims that he won nine National and Provincial Assembly seats across Sindh, but was defeated through pre-poll and post-poll rigging.

=== Advocacy and views ===
Soomro has been a consistent voice on various political and social issues. His key stances include:

- Opposition to the divisions of Sindh: He has been a staunch opponent of any moves to divide the province of Sindh, a sensitive political issue in the region. He has stated that such a division would "never be accepted."
- Electoral integrity: Following the 2024 general election in Pakistan, Soomro emerged as a leading figure in the protests against what he and his party termed "worst election rigging." He publicly demanded the resignation of the Sindh Election Commissioner and was reportedly injured during a protest in Karachi. His party, JUI-F, was one of several that alleged manipulation of results, particularly in favor of the Pakistan Muslim League (Nawaz) (PML-N) and the Pakistan People's Party (PPP).
- Criticism of PPP: Soomro has been a vocal critic of the PPP, which has long been the dominant political force in Sindh. He has accused the PPP government of failing to deliver on key promises in education and healthcare and has called for the formation of a new political alliance to offer an alternative to its governance.
- Political Rivalry with Bilawal Bhutto Zardari: Soomro's political ambitions have put him in direct opposition to the PPP's leadership. Ahead of the 2018 and 2024 general elections, he announced to contest against Chairman PPP Bilawal Bhutto Zardari. This move highlighted the growing political tension between the JUI-F and the PPP in Sindh.

== Notable events and controversies ==
- Injury during Protest: In February 2024, Soomro was injured during a protest against alleged election rigging in Karachi.
- Assassination attempt (2022): In February 2022, Soomro was the target of an assassination attempt at Goth Kanga while traveling to Miro Khan, Qamber Shehdadkot for political gathering. He was fired upon, but his police guards returned fire, repelling the assailants. Fifteen attackers were later arrested, with three reportedly confessing to the crime. This event underscored the dangerous nature of Pakistani politics and the personal risks associated with his public profile.
- Online controversies: Soomro has faced criticism for some of his remarks on social media. His comments against former Prime Minister Imran Khan, in particular, drew sharp reactions, with some observers labeling them as "below the belt."
