= Garhi Yasin =

Town and taluka in Sindh, Pakistan

Coordinates: 27°54′N 68°31′E

گڑھی ياسين ڳڙهي ياسين
- City
- Garhi Yasin
- Interactive map of گڑھی ياسين

Garhi Yasin Sindh (Sindhi: ڳڙھي ياسين G̈aṛhī Yāsīn, Urdu: گڑھی ياسين Gaṛhī Yāsīn) is a town and taluka of Shikarpur District, Sindh, Pakistan.
