= Shikarpur District =

District in Sindh, Pakistan

Shikarpur District ضلع شكارپور شڪارپور ضلعو
- District of Sindh
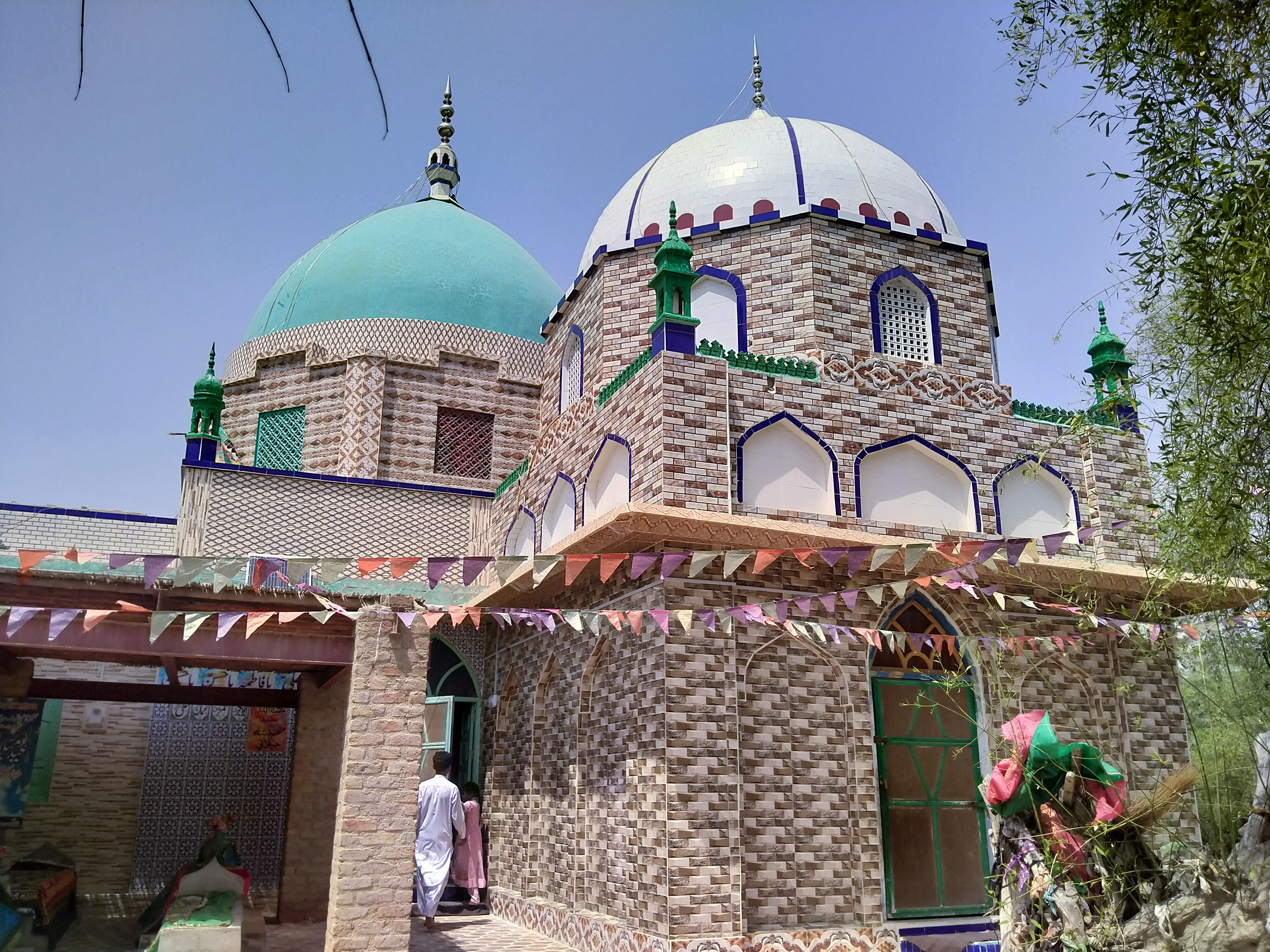
- Shrine in Nim Shareef

- Coordinates: 28°00′N 68°40′E
- Country: Pakistan
- Province: Sindh
- Division: Larkana
- Established: 1977
- Founder: Sindh Government
- Headquarters: Shikarpur

Government
  - Type: District Administration
  - Deputy Commissioner: N/A
  - District Police Officer: N/A
  - District Health Officer: N/A

Area
  - District of Sindh: 2,512 km^{2} (970 sq mi)

Population (2023 Pakistani census)
  - District of Sindh: 1,386,330
  - Density: 551.9/km^{2} (1,429/sq mi)
  - Urban: 318,738
  - Rural: 1,067,592

Literacy
  - Literacy rate: Total: 43.70%; Male: 52.59%; Female: 34.65%
- Time zone: UTC+5 (PST)
- Website: District Government Shikarpur official website - Archived

Shikarpur district (Sindhi: شڪارپور ضلعو, Urdu: ضلع شكارپور), is a district in Larkana Division of Sindh province in Pakistan.

The city of Shikarpur is the district headquarters. There are 4 talukas: Lakhi, Garhi Yasin, Khanpur Tehsil and Shikarpur Tehsil itself. It is spread over an area of 2,512 km^{2}.

== Geography ==
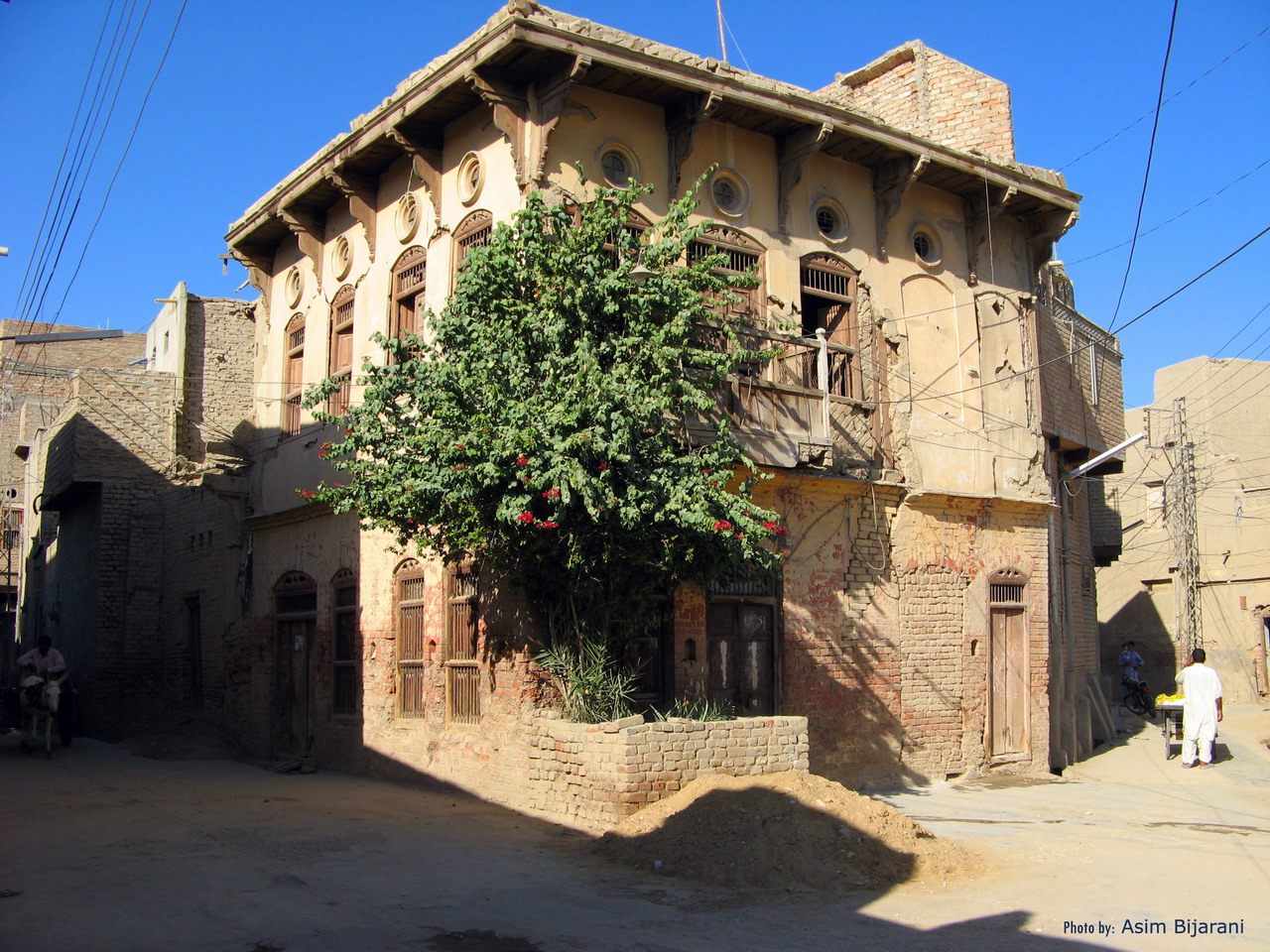
An old building architecture of Shikarpur.

Shikarpur district borders Larkana, Jacobabad, Khairpur and Sukkur. Two National Highways (N-65 & N-55) intersect the city of Shikarpur making it the junction points of 4 provinces.

== Administrative divisions ==
The district of Shikarpur is sub-divided into four Tehsils these are:

- Garhi Yasin
- Khanpur
- Lakhi
- Shikarpur

== Demographics ==
Historical population
Year	Pop.	±% p.a.
1951	306,007	—
1961	314,780	+0.28%
1972	530,551	+4.86%
1981	596,409	+1.31%
1998	880,438	+2.32%
2017	1,233,760	+1.79%
2023	1,386,330	+1.96%

As of the 2023 census, Shikarpur district has 214,824 households and a population of 1,386,330. The district has a sex ratio of 102.20 males to 100 females and a literacy rate of 43.70%: 52.59% for males and 34.65% for females. 514,189 (37.09% of the surveyed population) are under 10 years of age. 318,738 (22.99%) live in urban areas.

=== Religion ===
Religions in Shikarpur district (2023)
Religion	Percent
Islam	98.21%
Hinduism	1.51%
Other or not state	0.28%

The majority religion is Islam, with 98.21% of the population. Hinduism (including those from Scheduled Castes) is practiced by 1.51% of the population, a majority of whom live in urban areas.

Religion in contemporary Shikarpur District
Religious group	1941		2017		2023	
Religious group	Pop.	%	Pop.	%	Pop.	%
Islam	167,163	72.27%	1,215,158	98.49%	1,361,515	98.21%
Hinduism	63,276	27.36%	17,246	1.40%	20,885	1.51%
Others (Note: Including Jainism, Christianity, Buddhism, Zoroastrianism, Judaism, Ad-Dharmis, or not stated)	868	0.37%	1,356	0.11%	3,930	0.28%
Total Population	231,307	100%	1,233,760	100%	1,386,330	100%
Note: 1941 census data is for Garbi Yasin and Shikarpur taluks of Sukkur District, which roughly corresponds to contemporary Shikarpur District.

Religious groups in Shikarpur District (British Sindh era)
Religious group	1872		1881		1891		1901		1911		1921		1931		1941	
Religious group	Pop.	%	Pop.	%	Pop.	%	Pop.	%	Pop.	%	Pop.	%	Pop.	%	Pop.	%
Islam	628,662	80.99%	684,275	80.22%	728,661	79.59%	797,882	78.37%	414,671	72.25%	358,396	70.23%	440,148	70.56%	491,634	70.99%
Hinduism (Note: 1872 census: Also includes Tribals, Jains, Buddhists, and Nanakpanthis (Sikhs). 1881 census: Also includes Tribals and Nanakpanthis (Sikhs). 1891 census: Also includes Tribals. 1901 census: Also includes Tribals and Nanakpanthis (Sikhs).)	147,224	18.97%	167,896	19.68%	185,813	20.3%	218,829	21.49%	155,156	27.03%	148,188	29.04%	177,467	28.45%	195,458	28.22%
Christianity	238	0.03%	736	0.09%	522	0.06%	492	0.05%	585	0.1%	481	0.09%	827	0.13%	648	0.09%
Zoroastrianism	39	0.01%	64	0.01%	71	0.01%	66	0.01%	96	0.02%	123	0.02%	123	0.02%	59	0.01%
Judaism	1	0%	9	0%	27	0%	31	0%	5	0%	0	0%	10	0%	10	0%
Buddhism	—N/a	—N/a	6	0%	0	0%	0	0%	0	0%	0	0%	0	0%	0	0%
Jainism	—N/a	—N/a	0	0%	1	0%	0	0%	3	0%	16	0%	2	0%	0	0%
Sikhism	—N/a	—N/a	—N/a	—N/a	402	0.04%	—N/a	—N/a	3,295	0.57%	2,146	0.42%	5,180	0.83%	4,696	0.68%
Tribal	—N/a	—N/a	—N/a	—N/a	—N/a	—N/a	—N/a	—N/a	30	0.01%	942	0.18%	0	0%	51	0.01%
Others	63	0.01%	0	0%	0	0%	813	0.08%	72	0.01%	0	0%	22	0%	0	0%
Total population	776,227	100%	852,986	100%	915,497	100%	1,018,113	100%	573,913	100%	510,292	100%	623,779	100%	692,556	100%
Note1: British Sindh era district borders are not an exact match in the present-day due to various bifurcations to district borders — which since created new districts — throughout the region during the post-independence era that have taken into account population increases. Note2: District was renamed to Sukkur District in 1901, following district headquarter relocation from Shikarpur City to Sukkur City. Note3: District bifurcated in 1901 to create Larkana District.

=== Language ===
Languages of Shikarpur district (2023)
1. Sindhi (97.1%)
2. Brahui (1.29%)
3. Others (1.57%)

At the time of the 2023 census, 97.14% of the population spoke Sindhi and 1.29% Brahui as their first language.

== Bibliography ==
- 1998 District census report of Shikarpur. Census publication. Vol. 13. Islamabad: Population Census Organization, Statistics Division, Government of Pakistan. 1999.
