= Shikarpur, Sindh =

Shikarpur: شڪارپور; شکارپور
- City
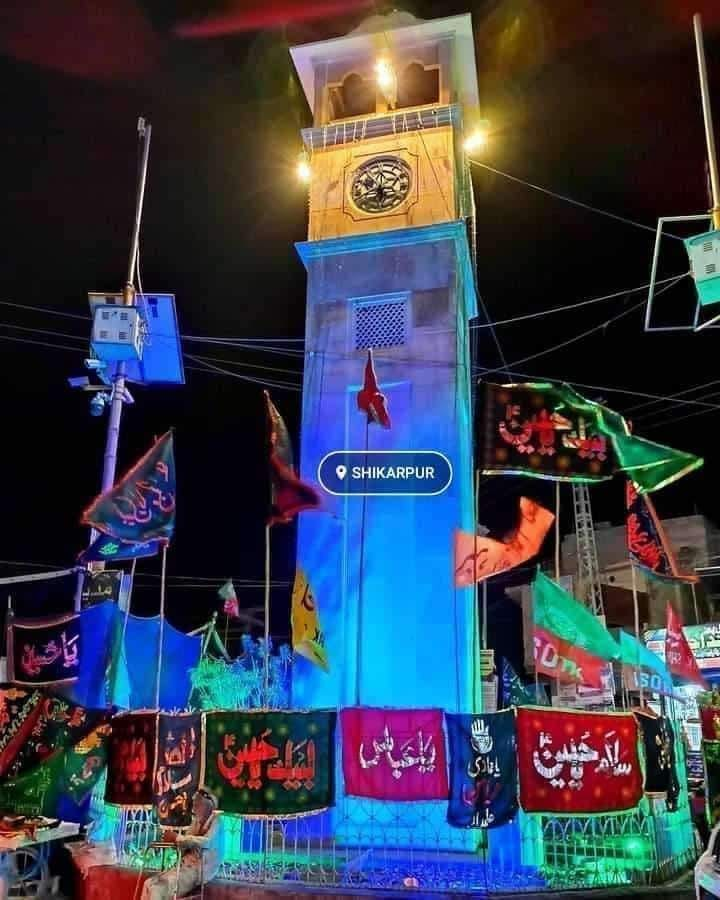
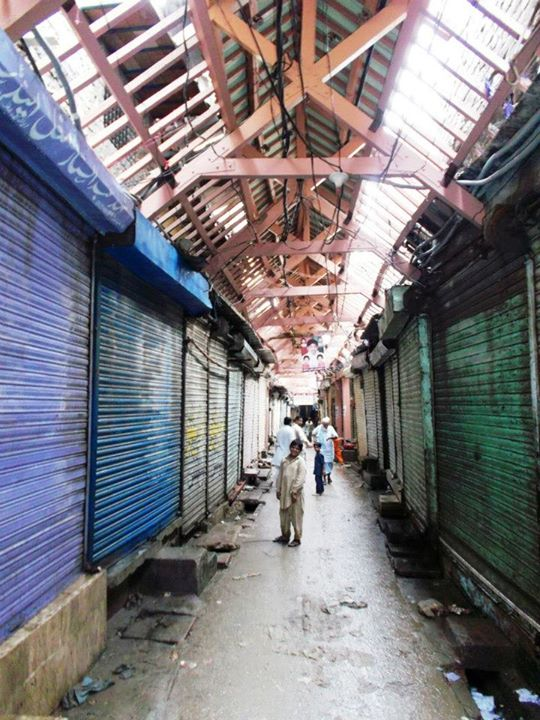
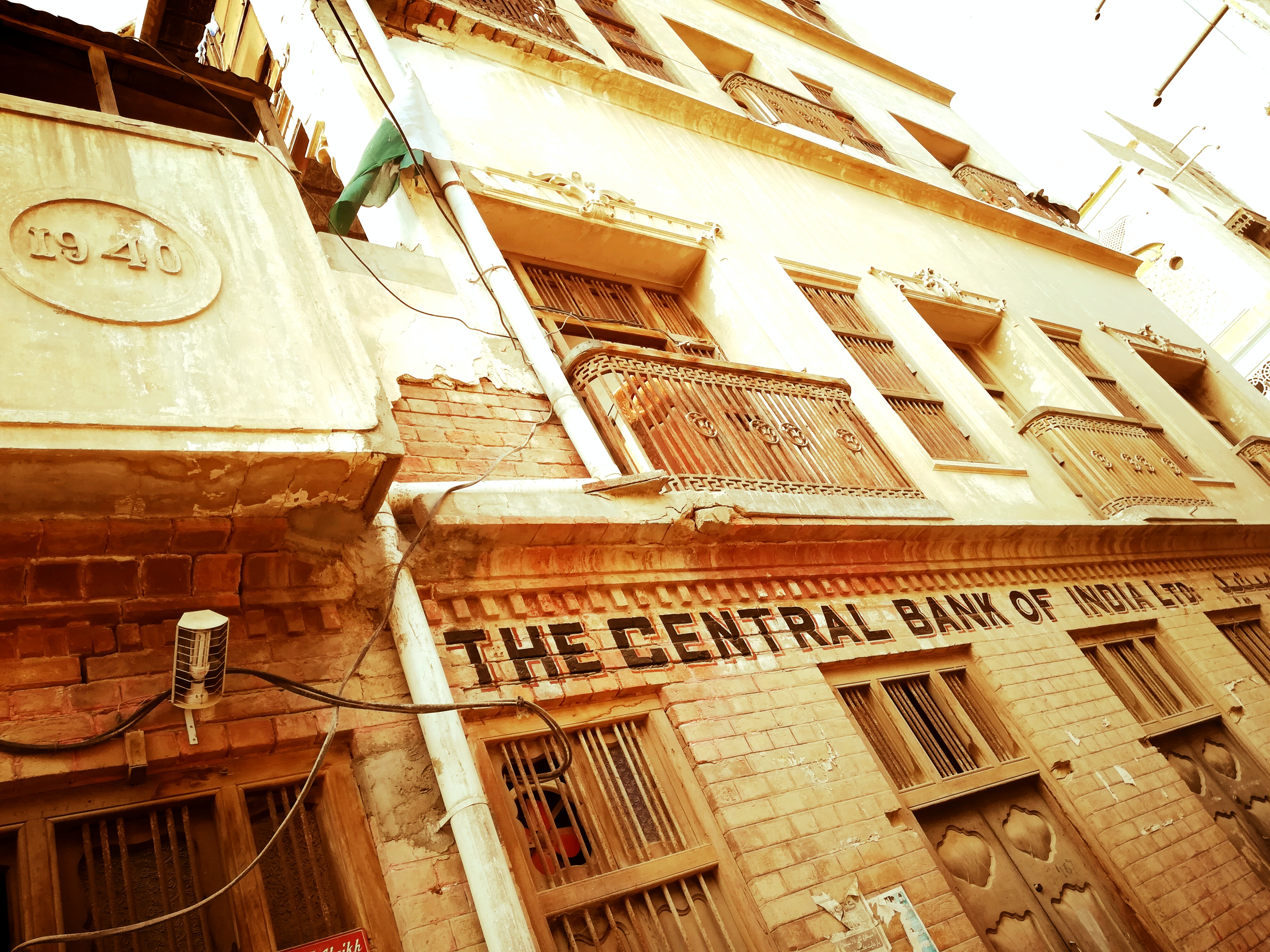
- Nickname: Paris Of Sindh
- Location of Shikarpur Shikarpur (Sindh)
- Coordinates: 27°57′N 68°39′E
- Country: Pakistan
- Province: Sindh
- Division: Larkana

Government
  - Type: Municipal Committee
  - Chairman: Fayaz Mehmood Shaikh
  - Vice Chairman: Waseem Siddiqui
- Elevation: 13 m (43 ft)

Population (2023 census)
  - City: 204,938
  - Rank: 52nd in Pakistan
- Time zone: UTC+5 (PST)
- Post code: 78100
- Calling code: 0726

Shikarpur (Sindhi: شڪارپور; Śikārpūr) is a city and the capital of Shikarpur District in Sindh province of Pakistan. It is situated about 29 km west of the right bank of the Indus, with a railway station, 37 km north-west of Sukkur. It is the 52nd largest city of Pakistan by population according to the 2017 census.

== History ==
Shikarpur was founded in 1677 as the hunting ground of Mahars. Shikarpur, the seat of civilisation, culture, trade and commerce acquired political and economic importance because of its strategic location on the map of Sindh, being directly accessible to those who came from Central and West Asia through the Bolan Pass.

In the early 17th century this emerald city in the northern Sindh province of Pakistan became the nucleus of a historical trade center on a caravan route through the Bolan Pass into Afghanistan. Shikarpur became the core of manufacturing including brass and metal goods, carpets, cotton cloth, and embroidery. Its great bazaar (covered because of the summer heat) is famous throughout Turkistan and southern Asia. The city's economic prosperity was underpinned by the concentration of several Shikarpuri Bania communities known as the Multanis (though not all of them actually hail from Multan). They were instrumental in increasing the importance of Shikarpur in the 18th century as the financial capital of the Durrani Empire.

Like many urban areas in Sindh, the city of Shikarpur was predominantly populated by Hindus prior to the partition of India. However, the predominantly Muslim population of Sindh supported Muslim League and Pakistan Movement. After the independence of Pakistan in 1947, the Sindhi Hindu minority migrated to India while the Muslims from India, called the Muhajirs, settled down in the Shikarpur District.

== Demographics ==
Population

Historical population

Year	Pop.	±% p.a.
1951	45,335	—
1961	53,910	+1.75%
1972	70,924	+2.52%
1981	88,138	+2.44%

Year	Pop.	±% p.a.
1998	134,883	+2.53%
2017	195,437	+1.97%
2023	204,938	+0.79%

According to 2023 census, Shikarpur had a population of 204,938. The population of Shikarpur District was estimated to be 1,231,481 in 2017. The predominant population is Sindhi. There are significant Urdu, Baloch, Brahui, speaking communities in Shikarpur. The population is mainly Muslim. There is a small Hindu minority in the city as most Hindus migrated to India after independence in 1947.

=== Language ===
1. Sindhi (98.9%)
2. Others (1.11%)

According to the 2023 Census of Pakistan, Shikarpur City has an overwhelmingly Sindhi-speaking population. Sindhi is the dominant language, spoken by 98.89% . The remaining 1.11% of the population consists of a multitude of different languages spoken in Pakistan (mostly Urdu, Brahui and Balochi). (Note: Language Data taken from the Urban Population of Jacobabad Taluka, as it corresponds with Jacobabad MC borders and population)

== Geography ==
Shikarpur District has an area of 2640 square kilometers, divided into four "talukas":

- Shikarpur, Sindh.
- Lakhi.
- Garhi Yasin .
- Khanpur, Sindh.

Its borders meet with districts of Larkana, Jacobabad, Khairpur, and Sukkur. Two national highways (N-65 & N-55) intersect in the city of Shikarpur, so it can well be termed as one of the junction points of the four provinces.

The district has a total road length of 920.0 kilometers, including 125.0 kilometers of National Highways and 195.0 kilometers of provincial highways. It is, thus, deficient in road density (0.35 km/Km^{2}) compared with recognized international parameters of development (1 km/Km^{2}). During the last few years, creeping development activity has taken place and 71.0 kilometers of road, 94 schools and a number of schemes in drainage, health and other sectors have been completed, under various programs. Basically, agrarian economy of district Shikarpur is dependent upon non-perennial irrigation system, so the district is always in semi-drought conditions. The last spell of drought is particularly notable as it created heavy unemployment and unsustainable poverty, which without any doubt created serious law and order situations.

=== Boundaries ===
The District is bounded on the north and east by Jacobabad District in the south by Sukkur District on the west by Indus River and Larkana District.

==== Gates of Shikarpur ====
The town consists of seven gates named Lakhi-dar, Hathi-dar, Hazari-dar, Civi-dar, Karan-dar, Wagono-dar, Khanpur-dar, and one window named Siddiqui Mari.

==== Covered Market or Dhak Bazar ====
Located in the center of the old city, Dhak Bazaar or covered market is a long, narrow street with shops on either sides. It is covered with woodwork of pure teak. It has been serving as a cool shade during the hot summers. Shikarpur along with other contemporary cities like Bukhara, Samarkand, and Istanbul at that time had a covered street market.

== Healthcare ==
- Rai Bahadur Udhaudas Tarachand Hospital (Civil Hospital)
- Hiranand Gangabai Ladies Hospital

== Education ==
Notable educational institutes located in Shikarpur include Shaikh Ayaz University and Chellaram and Seetaldas College. Institutes have their own libraries, but there is only one public library in Shikarpur named "Qadir Bux Bedil Library".

== Gallery ==
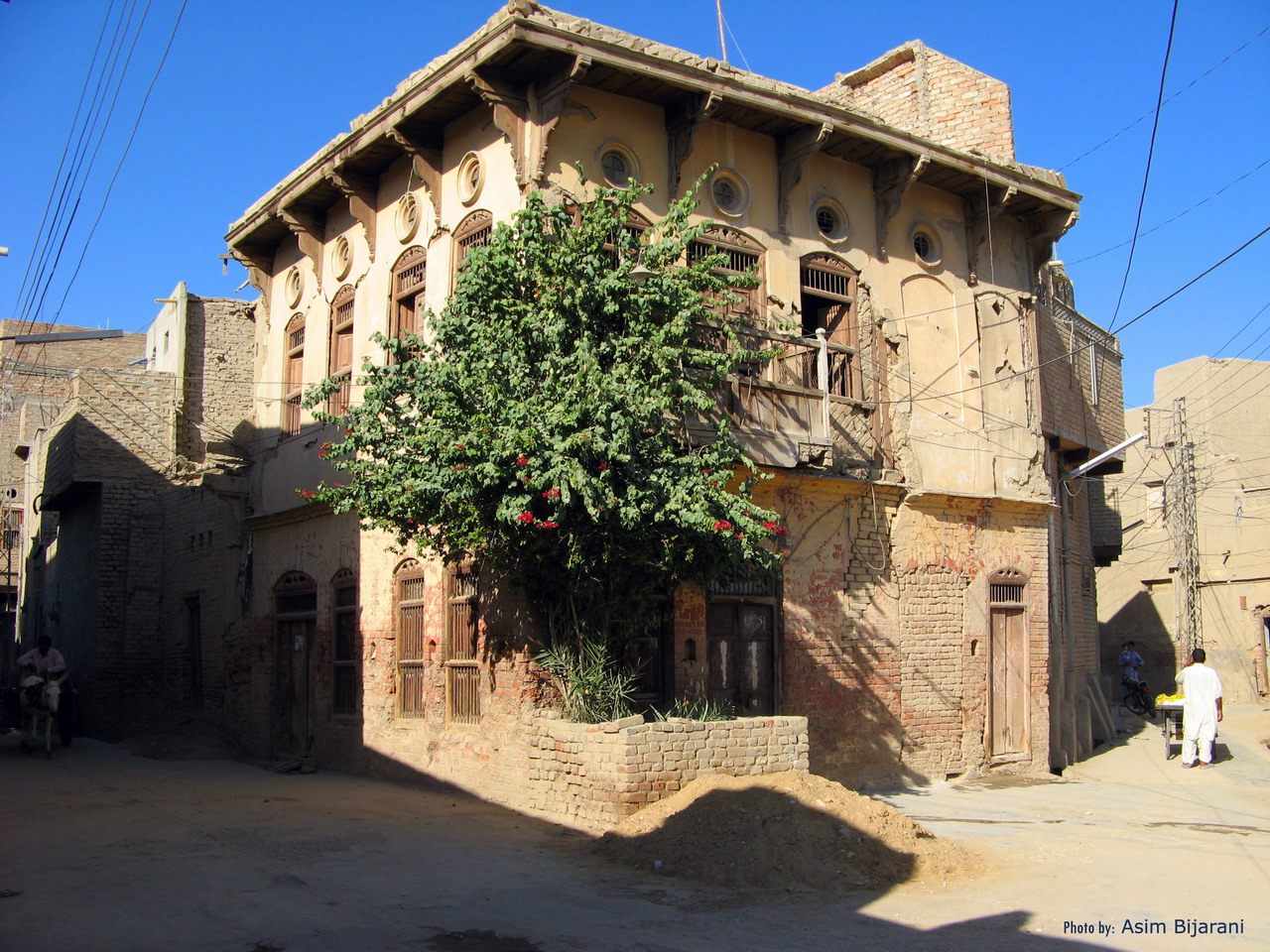
Old building architecture of Shikarpur

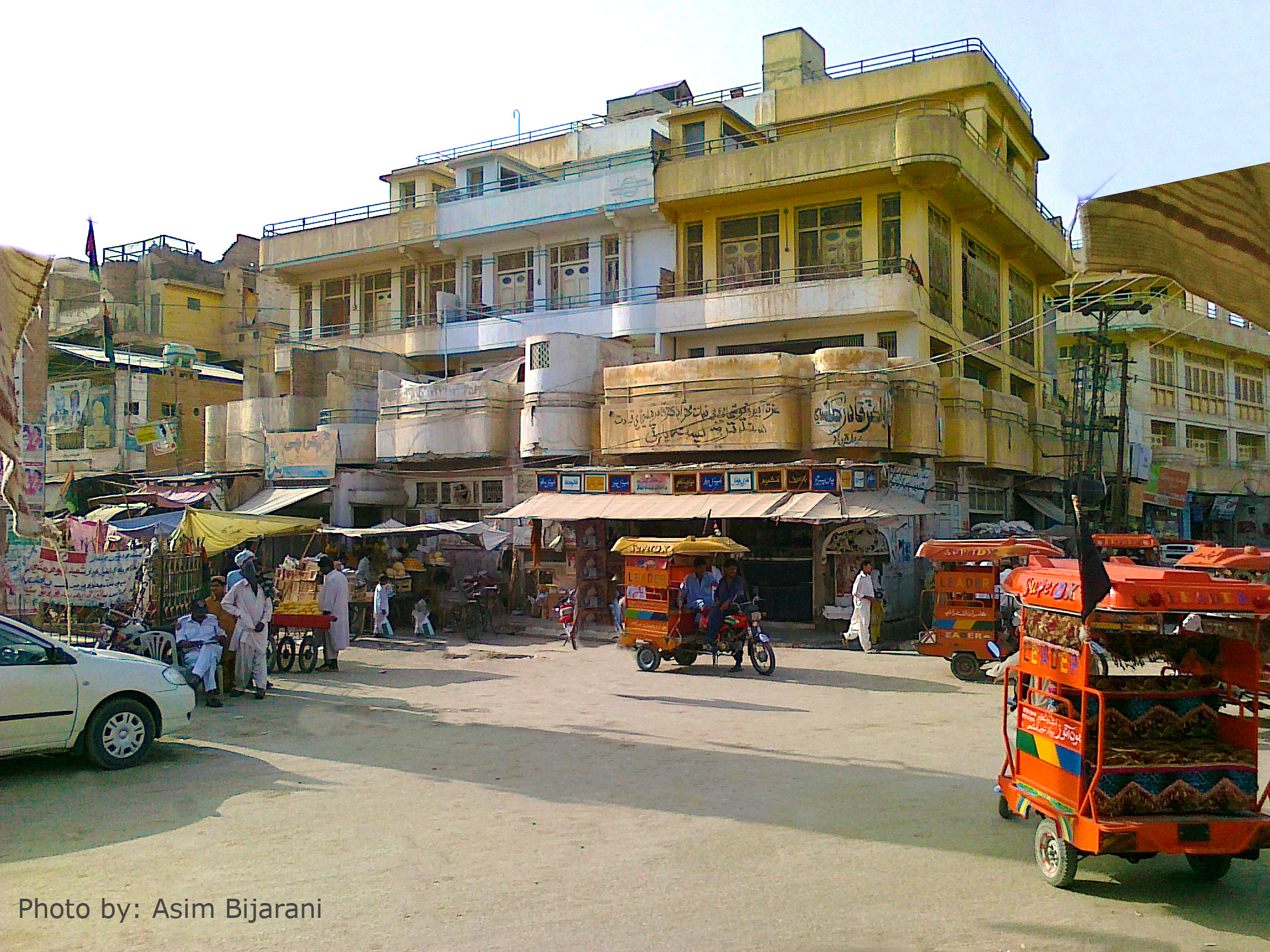
Deewan Ramchand's historical restaurant is very famous for its Sweets and Kulfi-Falooda

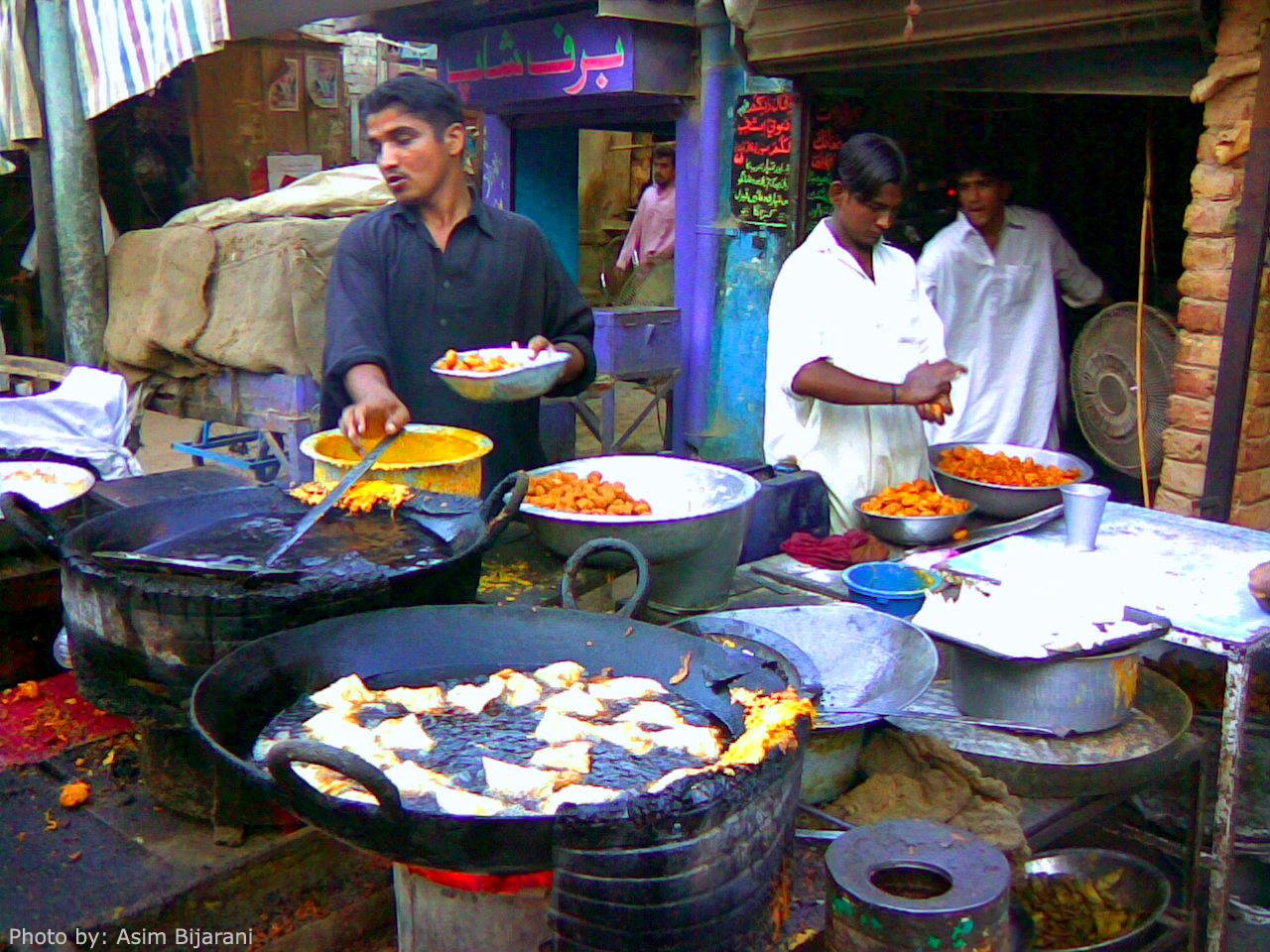
Samosa Making at Hathi dar Shikarpur

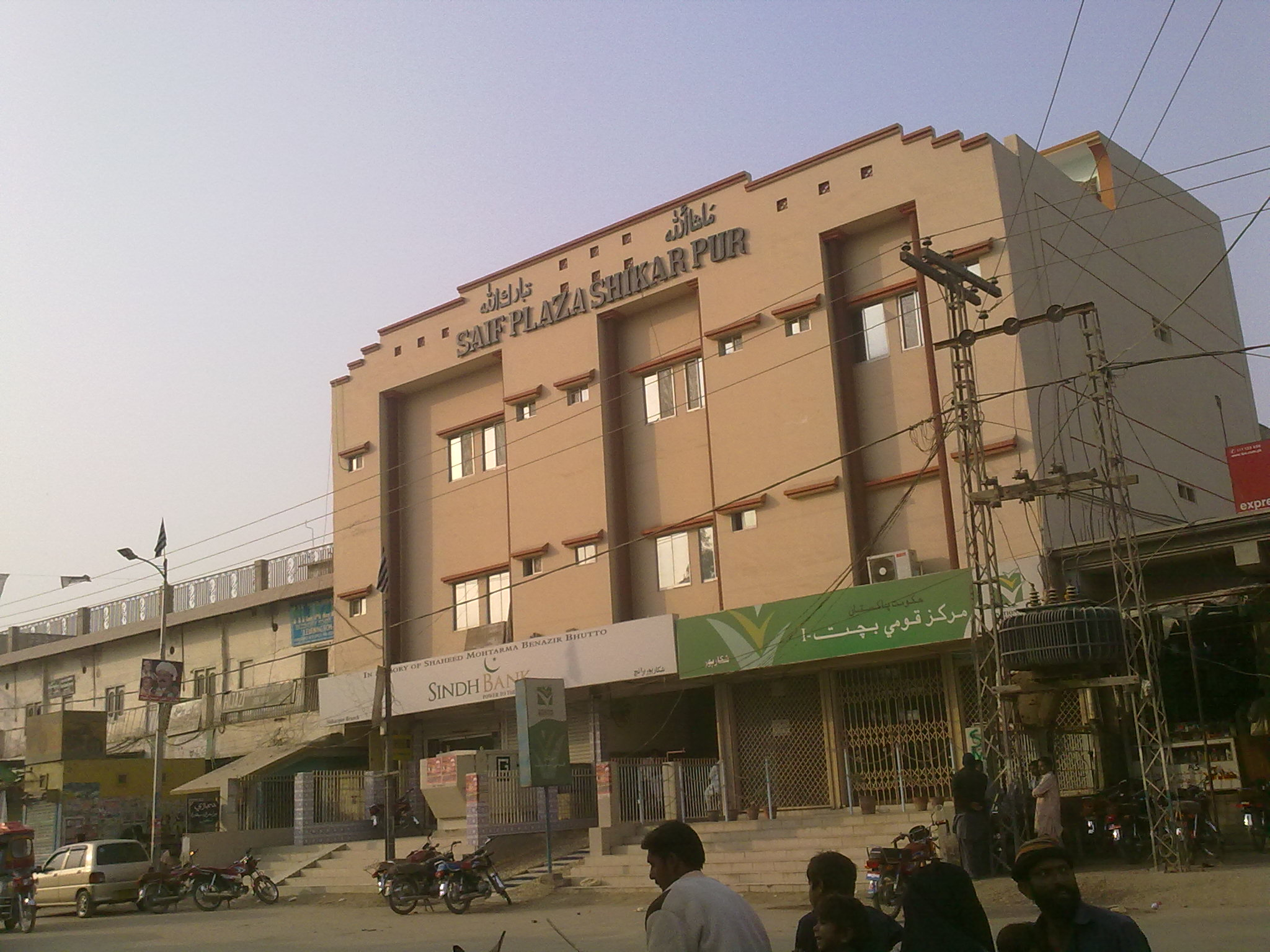
Shikarpur Saif plaza

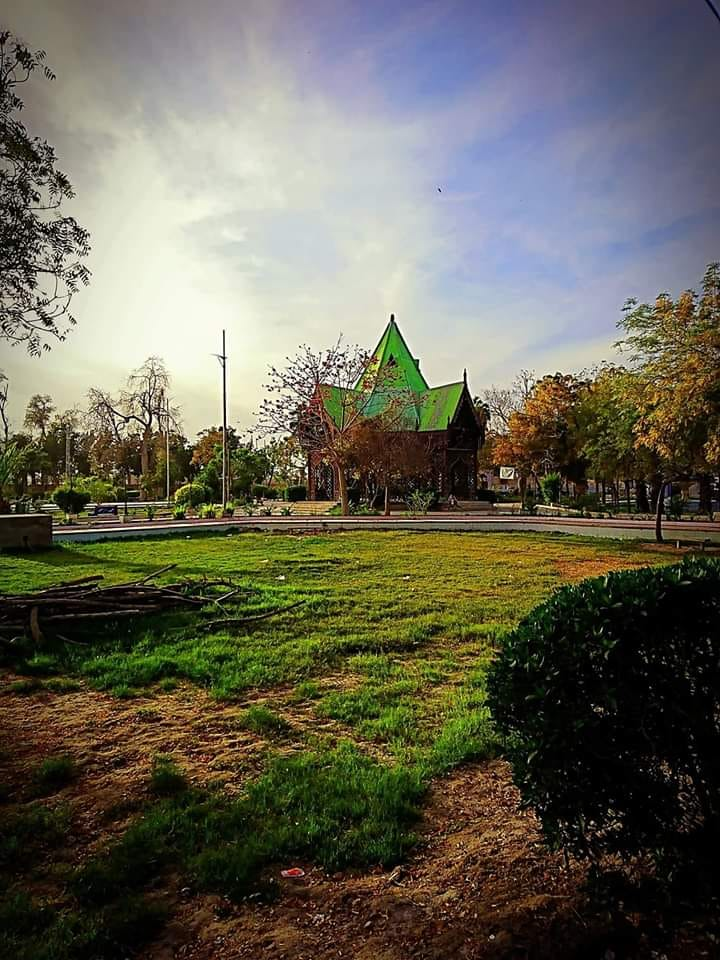
Shahi Bagh

== See also ==
- Shikarpuri achar
- Garhi Yasin
- Khanpur, Sindh
- Thul
- Sultan Kot
- Mian Jo Goth

== General references ==
- Markovits, Claude The Global World of Indian Merchants 1750-1947 Traders of Sind from Bukhara to Panama, Cambridge, Cambridge University Press, 2004, pp. 65–217.
