= NA-191 Jacobabad-cum-Kashmore =

Constituency of the National Assembly of Pakistan

- Constituency for the National Assembly of Pakistan
- Region: Thul Tehsil (partly) of Jacobabad District and Kashmore, Kandhkot and Tangwani Tehsils (Partly) of Kashmore District
- Electorate: 499,958

Current constituency
- Created: 2018
- Party: Pakistan People's Party
- Member: Ali Jan Mazari
- Created from: NA-209 (Jacobabad-II); NA-210 (Jacobabad-III)

NA-191 Jacobabad-cum-Kashmore (این اے-191، جیکب آباد-کم-کشمور) is a constituency for the National Assembly of Pakistan. It comprises the entirety of Kashmore District. It was created in the 2018 delimitation from the merger of the old constituencies of NA-209 and NA-210.

== Assembly Segments ==
Constituency number	Constituency	District	Current MPA	Party
4	PS-4 Kashmore-I	Kashmore District	Abdul Rauf Khoso	PPP
5	PS-5 Kashmore-II	Kashmore District	Ghulam Abid Khan	PPP
6	PS-6 Kashmore-III	Kashmore District	Mir Mehboob Ali Khan Bijarani	PPP

== Members of Parliament ==
=== 2018–2023: NA-197 Kashmore ===
Election	Member	Party
2018	Ehsan ur Rehman Mazari	PPP

=== 2024–present: NA-191 Jacobabad-cum-Kashmore ===
Election	Member	Party
2024	Ali Jan Mazari	PPP

== Election 2018 ==
General elections were held on 25 July 2018.

General election 2018: NA-197 (Kashmore)
Party	Candidate	Votes	%	±%
PPP	Ehsan ur Rehman Mazari	84,742	56.50	
MMA	Shamsher Ali Mazari	47,326	31.55	
Others	Others (seventeen candidates)	17,925	11.95	
Turnout		165,333	36.37	
Total valid votes		149,993	90.72	
Rejected ballots		15,340	9.28	
Majority		37,416	24.95	
Registered electors		454,542		
PPP hold		Swing	N/A	

== Election 2024 ==
General elections were held on 8 February 2024. Ali Jan Mazari won the election with 103,548 votes.

General election 2024: NA-191 Jacobabad-cum-Kashmore
Party	Candidate	Votes	%	±%
PPP	Ali Jan Mazari	103,548	48.16	▼8.34
JUI (F)	Shazane Khan	101,874	47.38	N/A
Others	Others (twelve candidates)	9,577	4.45	
Turnout		231,085	46.22	▲9.85
Total valid votes		214,999	93.04	
Rejected ballots		16,086	6.96	
Majority		1,674	0.78	▼24.17
Registered electors		499,958		
PPP hold				

== See also ==
- NA-190 Jacobabad
- NA-192 Kashmore-cum-Shikarpur
