= NA-192 Kashmore-cum-Shikarpur =

Constituency of the National Assembly of Pakistan

- Constituency for the National Assembly of Pakistan
- Region: Thul Tehsil (partly) of Jacobabad District and Kashmore, Kandhkot and Tangwani Tehsils (Partly) of Kashmore District Khanpur Tehsil، Shikarpur Tehsil (partly) Lakhi Tehsil (partly) of Shikarpur District
- Electorate: 305,410

Current constituency
- Party: Pakistan People's Party
- Member: Mir Shabbir Bijarani
- Created from: NA-202 Shikarpur-I

NA-192 Kashmore-cum-Shikarpur (این اے-192،کشمور-کم- شِكارپُور) is a constituency for the National Assembly of Pakistan.

== Assembly Segments ==
Constituency number	Constituency	District	Current MPA	Party
7	PS-7 Shikarpur-I	Shikarpur District	Imtiaz Ahmed Shaikh	PPP
8	PS-8 Shikarpur-II	Shikarpur District	Muhammad Arif Khan Mahar	PPP

== Members of Parliament ==
=== 2018–2023: NA-198 Shikarpur-I ===
Election	Member	Party
2018	Abid Hussain Bhayo	PPP

=== 2024–present: NA-192 Kashmore-cum-Shikarpur ===
Election	Member	Party
2024	Mir Shabbir Bijarani	PPP

== Election 2002 ==
General elections were held on 10 October 2002. Muhammad Ibrahim Jatoi of National Alliance won by 53,235 votes. The case was taken to the supreme court by Aftab Shahban Mirani where he won the case and regained the seat.

General election 2002: NA-202 (Shikarpur-I)
Party	Candidate	Votes	%	±%
NA	Muhammad Ibrahim Jatoi	53,235	56.45	
PPP	Aftab Shahban Mirani	40,125	42.55	
Others	Others (three candidates)	941	1.00	
Turnout		96,447	37.74	
Total valid votes		94,301	97.78	
Rejected ballots		2,146	2.22	
Majority		13,110	13.90	
Registered electors		255,576		

== Election 2008 ==
General elections were held on 18 February 2008. Aftab Shabaan Meerani of PPP won by 47,379 votes.

General election 2008: NA-202 (Shikarpur-I)
Party	Candidate	Votes	%	±%
PPP	Aftab Shahban Mirani	47,379	46.55	
NPP	Muhammad Ibrahim Jatoi	39,405	38.72	
MMA	Abdullah Pahore	12,521	12.30	
Others	Others (six candidates)	2,468	2.43	
Turnout		106,350	38.62	
Total valid votes		101,773	95.70	
Rejected ballots		4,577	4.30	
Majority		7,974	7.83	
Registered electors		275,349		

== Election 2013 ==
General elections were held on 11 May 2013. Mr. Aftab Shahban Mirani of PPP won by 54,013 votes and became the member of National Assembly.

General election 2013: NA-202 (Shikarpur-I)
Party	Candidate	Votes	%	±%
PPP	Aftab Shahban Mirani	54,013	38.73	
NPP	Muhammad Ibrahim Jatoi	53,780	38.56	
JUI (F)	Abdullah Pahore	26,014	18.65	
Others	Others (nine candidates)	5,657	4.06	
Turnout		145,297	55.81	
Total valid votes		139,464	95.99	
Rejected ballots		5,833	4.01	
Majority		233	0.17	
Registered electors		260,355		

== Election 2018 ==
General elections were held on 25 July 2018.

General election 2018: NA-198 Shikarpur-I
Party	Candidate	Votes	%	±%
PPP	Abid Hussain Bhayo	64,187	44.03	
Independent	Muhammad Ibrahim Jatoi	44,829	30.75	
MMA	Abdullah Pahore	26,853	18.42	
Others	Others (ten candidates)	9,912	6.80	
Turnout		153,109	50.13	
Total valid votes		145,781	95.21	
Rejected ballots		7,328	4.79	
Majority		19,358	13.28	
Registered electors		305,410		
PPP hold		Swing	N/A	

== Election 2024 ==
Elections were held on 8 February 2024. Mir Shabbir Bijarani won the election with 124,979 votes.

General election 2024: NA-192 Kashmore-cum-Shikarpur
Party	Candidate	Votes	%	±%
PPP	Mir Shabbir Bijarani	124,979	58.96	▲14.93
JUI (F)	Muhammad Ibrahim Jatoi	76,970	36.31	
Others	Others (nine candidates)	10,010	4.72	
Turnout		221,101	54.99	▲4.86
Total valid votes		211,959	95.87	
Rejected ballots		9,142	4.13	
Majority		48,009	22.65	▲9.37
Registered electors		402,106		
PPP hold				

== See also ==
- NA-191 Jacobabad-cum-Kashmore
- NA-193 Shikarpur
