= Afza =

Afza may also refer to:

== People ==
- Nishat Afza (1940-2016), Pakistani politician
- Nudrat Afza (born 1955), Pakistani photographer

== Other uses ==
- Rooh Afza, Indian drink
