= Bijarani Buledi =

Clan of the Buledi tribe

Bijrani (Urdu: بجارانی بلیدی) is a clan of the Buledi tribe, in Balochistan Gurjara and Sindh, Pakistan. Bijarani is also a clan of the Marri tribe.

== Notables ==
- Mir Hazar Khan Bijarani (Ex - Politician)
- Mir Shabbir Khan Bijarani (Politician and Son or Mir Hazar Khan Bijarani)

== See also ==
- Buleda
