= Ehsan ur Rehman Mazari =

Pakistani politician

Member of the National Assembly of Pakistan
- In office 13 August 2018 – 10 August 2023
- Constituency: NA-197 (Kashmore)
- In office 1 June 2013 – 31 May 2018
- Constituency: NA-210 (Kashmore)

Personal details
- Born: August 14, 1981 (age 44) Kashmore, Sindh, Pakistan
- Party: PPP (2013-present)

Ehsan ur Rehman Mazari (Urdu: احسان الرحمن مزاری; born 14 August 1981) is a Pakistani politician who had been a member of the National Assembly of Pakistan from August 2018 till August 2023. Previously he was a member of the National Assembly from June 2013 to May 2018.

== Early life ==
He was born on 14 August 1981.

== Political career ==
He was elected to the National Assembly of Pakistan as a candidate of the Pakistan Peoples Party (PPP) from Constituency NA-210 (Kashmore) in the 2013 Pakistani general election. He received 55,808 votes and defeated an independent candidate, Mir Ghalib Hussain Domki.

He was re-elected to the National Assembly as a candidate of the PPP from NA-197 Kashmore in the 2018 Pakistani general election.

He took oath as Federal Minister on 19 April 2022. On 21 April 2022, his portfolio was changed from Federal Minister for Human Rights (Urdu: وزارت انسانی حقوق, abbreviated as MoHR) to Federal Minister for Inter Provincial Coordination.
