= Gul Muhammad Khan Jakhrani =

Pakistani politician

Mir Gul Muhammad Khan Jakhrani

Member of the National Assembly of Pakistan
- In office 2008–2013
- Constituency: NA-210 (Kashmore)

Gul Muhammad Khan Jakhrani is a Pakistani politician who was a member of the National Assembly of Pakistan from 2008 to 2013.

On 12 June 2023 he was elected unopposed as chairman of the Kashmore District Council.

== Political career ==
He was elected to the National Assembly of Pakistan from Constituency NA-210 (Kashmore) as a candidate of Pakistan Peoples Party (PPP) in the 2008 Pakistani general election. He received 82,189 votes and defeated Asghar Ali Khan Bijarani, a candidate of Jamiat Ulama-e-Islam (S) (JUI-S).

He is currently Coordinator Pakistan Peoples Party (PPP) district Badin Sindh and District President Pakistan Peoples Party (PPP) Kashmore District Kashmore, Sindh

He remained Advisor to Chief Minister, Sindh for Prisons Department. 2. Federal Parliamentary Secretary for Defence Production and 3. Federal Parliamentary Secretary for Education from 2008 to 2013 in Pakistan Peoples Party Government.

In Local bodies elections 2023 he unopposed as a chairman district council kashmore https://www.dawn.com/news/1758173
