= Bakhshapur =

Town in Sindh, Pakistan

Bakhshapur بخشاپور
- Town
- Location within Sindh Location within Pakistan
- Coordinates: 28°22′41″N 69°21′55″E
- Country: Pakistan
- Province: Sindh
- District: Kashmore

Population (2023)
  - Total: 9,603
- Time zone: UTC+5 (PST)
- Literacy rate: 66.2% (Ten years and above)

Bakhshapur is a town in Kashmore, Sindh, Pakistan.

== Demographics ==
Historical population
Year	Pop.	±% p.a.
1998	7,398	—
2017	10,535	+1.88%
2023	9,603	−1.53%

According to 2023 census, Bakhshapur town had a population of 9,603.

Languages

Languages of Bakhshapur TC (2023 Census)
1. Sindhi (95.8%)
2. Balochi (4.10%)
3. Others (0.10%)

According to the 2023 census, Sindhi is the primary language spoken in Buxapur, native to 95.8% of the population. Balochi is spoken by 4.10% of residents, while all other languages combined account for 0.10%.
