= Mir Shabbir Bijarani =

Pakistani politician (born 1973)

- میر شبیر بیجارانی

Provincial Minister of Sindh for Mines and Mineral Development
- In office 19 August 2018 – 11 August 2023

Member of the Provincial Assembly of Sindh
- In office 13 August 2018 – 11 August 2023
- Constituency: PS-6 Kashmore-III

Member of the National Assembly of Pakistan
- Incumbent
- Assumed office 29 February 2024
- Constituency: NA-192 Kashmore-cum-Shikarpur
- In office 1 June 2013 – 31 May 2018
- Constituency: NA-209 (Jacobabad-cum-Kashmore)

Personal details
- Born: 20 April 1973 (age 52) Kashmore, Sindh, Pakistan
- Party: PPP (2013-present)
- Parent: Hazar Khan Bijarani (father)

Mir Shabbir Ali Bijarani (Urdu: میر شبیر علی بیجارانی; Sindhi: مير شبير علي بجاراڻي؛; born 20 April 1973) is a Pakistani politician who has been a member of the National Assembly of Pakistan since February 2024 and previously served in this position from June 2013 to May 2018. He was also the Provincial Minister of Sindh for Mines and Mineral Development, in office from August 2018 till August 2023. He had been a member of the Provincial Assembly of Sindh from August 2018 till August 2023.

== Early life and education ==
He was born on 20 April 1973 to Hazar Khan Bijarani in Jacobabad, Pakistan.

He has done graduation.

== Political career ==
He became district nazim of Jacobabad district after defeating Sardar Muqeem Khoso in the local bodies election in 2001. He served as nazim of Jacobabad until the district was bifurcated in December 2004.

He ran for the seat of the National Assembly of Pakistan as an independent candidate from Constituency NA-209 (Jacobabad-cum-Kashmore) in the 2008 Pakistani general election but was unsuccessful. He received 248 votes and lost the seat to Hazar Khan Bijarani.

He was elected to the National Assembly as a candidate of Pakistan Peoples Party (PPP) from Constituency NA-209 (Jacobabad-cum-Kashmore) in the 2013 Pakistani general election. He received 54,881 votes and defeated Mir Hassan Khoso, a candidate of Pakistan Muslim League (F) (PML-F).

He was elected to the Provincial Assembly of Sindh as a candidate of PPP from PS-6 Kashmore-III in the 2018 Sindh provincial election.

On 19 August 2018, he was inducted into the provincial Sindh cabinet of Chief Minister Syed Murad Ali Shah and was made Provincial Minister of Sindh for Mines & Mineral Development.

He was re-elected to the National Assembly from NA-192 Kashmore-cum-Shikarpur as a candidate of PPP in the 2024 Pakistani general election. He received 124,979 votes and defeated Muhammad Ibrahim Jatoi, a candidate of Jamiat Ulema-e-Islam (F) (JUI(F)).
