= Ghouspur, Sindh =

Ghauspur غوث پور
- Town
- Location of Ghauspur Ghauspur (Pakistan)
- Coordinates: 28°8′22″N 69°4′49″E
- Country: Pakistan
- Province: Sindh
- Division: Larkana
- District: Kashmore

Government
  - Type: Town Committee
  - Chairman: Abdul Nabi
  - Voice Chairman: Nazir Ahmed
- Elevation: 73 m (240 ft)

Population (2023)
  - Total: 43,476
- Time zone: UTC+5 (PST)

Ghouspur or Ghauspur (Urdu: غوث پور) is a town of Kashmore District located in the Sindh Province of Pakistan.

== Demographics ==
Population

Historical population of Ghauspur
Census year	Population
1981	14,293
1998	25,081
2017	35,319
2023	43,476

According to the 2023 census, Ghauspur Town had a population of 43,476, reflecting its status as a significant urban settlement in the area.

Languages

Languages of Ghauspur TC (2023 Census)
1. Sindhi (98.6%)
2. Pashto (0.30%)
3. Others (1.10%)

The 2023 census recorded Sindhi as the predominant language in Ghauspur Town Committee, spoken by 98.6% of the population. Pashto accounted for 0.30%, while Balochi, Urdu, and other languages collectively accounted for the remaining 1.10% of the population.

== See Also ==
- Thul
- Kashmore
- Kandhkot
