= Peter Marlow (photographer) =

British photographer (1952–2016)

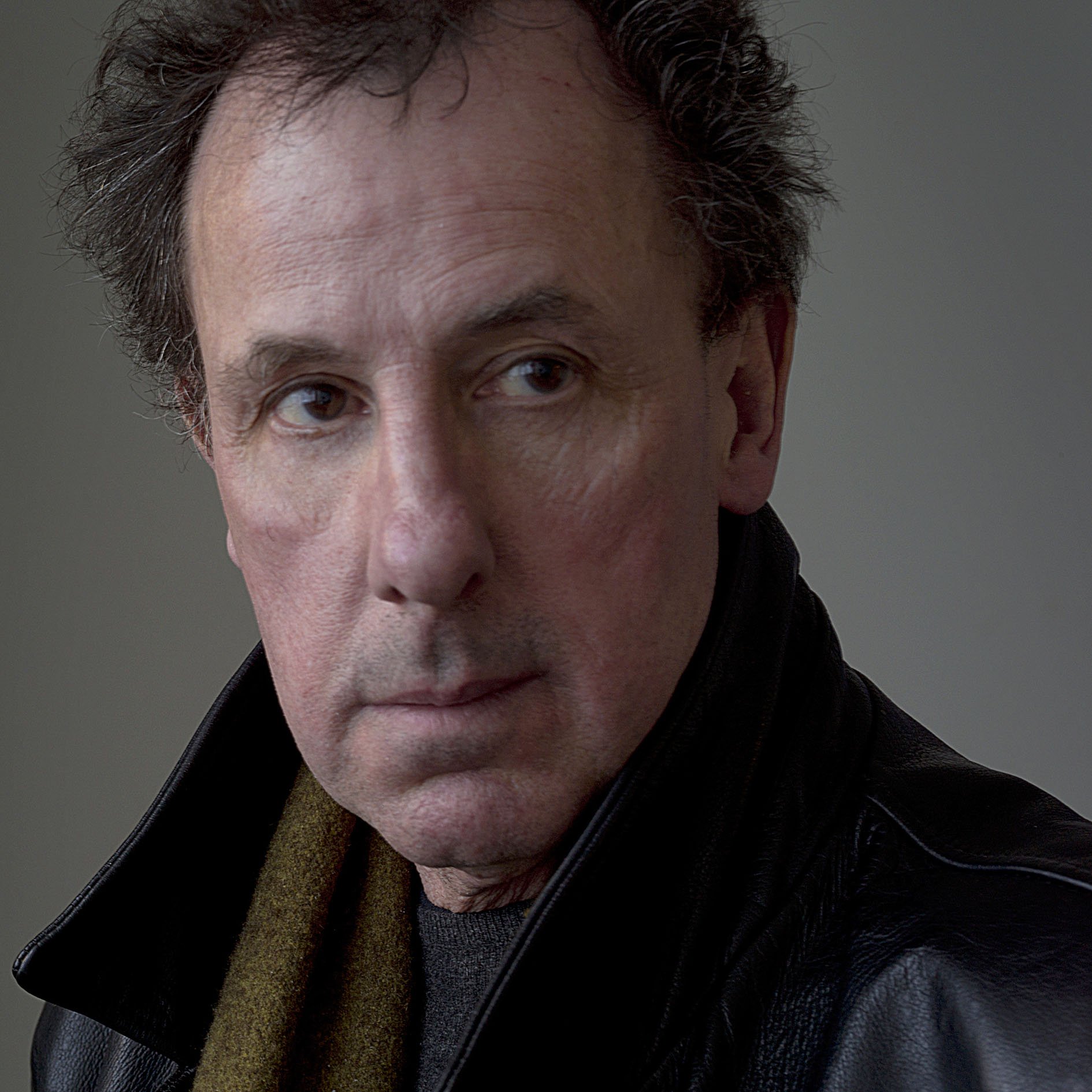
Peter Marlow in 2013

Peter Marlow (19 January 1952 – 21 February 2016) was a British photographer and photojournalist, and member of Magnum Photos.

== Early life and education ==
Marlow was born in Kenilworth in 1952. He studied psychology at Manchester University, graduating in 1974.

== Career ==
He began his photography career in 1975 working on an Italian cruise liner in the Caribbean before joining the Sygma news agency in Paris in 1976. In the 1970s, Marlow worked in Northern Ireland, Angola, The Philippines and Lebanon primarily as a war photographer, but soon found that the competition of photojournalism did not suit him.

I did get some very good pictures, and was doing a lot of conflict work, but I just realised I was never ever going to be Don McCullin. And actually, in certain situations, I was very, very scared.

He returned home to Britain, and worked in Liverpool on an eight-year project, Liverpool – Looking out to Sea, which documented what he perceived to be decline of the city under Margaret Thatcher.

He became associated with Magnum Photos in 1980 and became a full member in 1986, having been attracted to the freedom the agency gives its photographers to work on personal projects. Alongside Chris Steele-Perkins, he founded Magnum's London office in 1987. He served as the agency's president twice and was vice-president numerous times. The photographer Martin Parr said it was "difficult to overestimate" Marlow's contribution to Magnum.

He also worked regularly for The Sunday Times in the mid-1980s. In 1991 he received an assignment from the Somme department in France to photograph Amiens. Later he began to work abroad again, travelling to Japan, the United States, and other parts of Europe. His later photography is primarily in color. Though well known for his depictions of places, Marlow also documented politics with a collaboration with Tony Blair.

Marlow is also known for his photos of his three sons and wife.

Marlow died on 21 February 2016 from influenza contracted during a stem cell transplant as a treatment for multiple myeloma.

== Publications ==
=== Books by Marlow ===
- Liverpool: Looking out to Sea. London: Jonathan Cape/Random House, 1993. ISBN 0-224-03727-7; ISBN 0-224-03728-5
- Concorde: The Last Summer. London: Thames & Hudson, 2006. ISBN 978-0-500-51312-5. With a preface by A. A. Gill and an introduction by Mike Bannister.
  - Concorde: le dernier été. Paris: Thames & Hudson, 2006. ISBN 9782878112832. Translated by Joëlle Marelli.
- The English Cathedral. London and New York: Merrell, 2012. ISBN 9781858945903. With an introduction by Martin Barnes and other text by John Goodall.
- English National Ballet: Breaking New Ground. London: Magnum Photos, 2015. ISBN 978-0956547842.
- Undercover Spitalfields: Market Stories. London: Magnum Photos, 2013. ISBN 9780956547835. With Ballymore Group.

=== Books with others ===
- Département Somme: regards de photographes. Amiens: Trois Cailloux, 1992. ISBN 2903082669. Photographs by Marlow, Harry Gruyaert, Jeanloup Sieff, Michel Vanden Eeckhoudt, Martine Voyeux and Hugues de Wurstemberger; prefaces by Christian Caujolle and Jacques Darras.
- Way to Gods: Magunamu Foto: Kumano kodō, Santiago e no michi (WAY to GODS マグナム フォト 熊野古道 サンティアゴへの道), ed. Nagasaka Yoshimitsu (永坂嘉光). Tokyo: Kawade Kobō Shinsha, 1999. ISBN 4-309-90293-6. (Additional title on front cover: Ancient Kumano Roads and Roads to Santiago.) Contains photographs by Marlow of Kumano kodō and camino de Santiago; as well as photographs by Elliott Erwitt, Chris Steele-Perkins and Harry Gruyaert.
- The Shape of a Pocket. London: Bloomsbury, 2001. With John Berger.

== Filmography ==
- 1989: Moving Stills – Channel 4, UK
- 1992: Waiting for Madonna – documentary, 15 min, directed by Marlow, TV Tokyo, Japan/Little Magic Productions USA
- 1994: Profile of Peter Marlow – The Late Show, BBC, UK

== Awards ==
- 1982: Arts Council of Great Britain
- 1986: National Headline Award
- 1999: III Premio de Creación Fotográfica Luis Ksado
- 2006: Honorary Fellowship of the Royal Photographic Society, Bath, UK

== Exhibitions ==
- 1979: The Ultra Right in Europe, The Canon Gallery, Amsterdam
- 1983: London by Night, The Photographers' Gallery, London
- 1987: Peter Marlow's London Night Photos, Lausanne, Switzerland
- 1989: Liverpool, Il Diaframma, Milan
- 1993: Looking Out to Sea, Open Eye Gallery, Liverpool; The Photographers' Gallery, London
- 1993: Brighton Besides the Seaside, University of Brighton, Brighton, UK
- 1994: Looking Out to Sea, Royal Photographic Society, Bath, UK
- 1998: Non Places, Keynes Gallery, Canterbury, UK
- 1999: Ancient Kumano Roads Japan and the Road to Santiago de Compostela Spain, Galleries in Osaka, Kyoto, Tokyo and Wakayama, Japan
- 2000: Britain, Saison Photographique Cherbourg Octeville, France
- 2001: Nantes, ABN AMRO Gallery Nantes, France
- 2009–2010: London at Night, The Wapping Project Bankside, Wapping Hydraulic Power Station, London
- 2011: Point of Interest, The Wapping Project Bankside, Wapping Hydraulic Power Station, London
- 2013: The English Cathedral, The Wapping Project Bankside, Wapping Hydraulic Power Station, London

== Collections ==
Marlow's work is held in the following public collections:

- Museum of London, London
- Imperial War Museum, London
- Louisiana Museum of Modern Art, Denmark
- The Arts Council of Great Britain, UK
- The Photographers' Gallery, London
- Centre national de la photographie, Paris
- Victoria and Albert Museum, London
- Royal Photographic Society, Bath, UK
- Institute Valenciano Arte Moderne, Valencia, Spain
- The National Portrait Gallery, London
- Archive of the Birmingham City Library, Birmingham, UK
- Magnum Photos Collection, Harry Ransom Center, University of Texas at Austin, TX
