= Constituency NA-210 =

Former constituency of the National Assembly of Pakistan

Constituency NA-210 (Kashmore)
- Former constituency for the National Assembly of Pakistan
- Region: kashmore District

Former constituency
- Created: 2002
- Abolished: 2018
- Replaced by: NA-197 (Kashmore)

Constituency NA-210 (Kashmore) (Urdu: این اے-۲۱۰، کشمور) was a constituency for the National Assembly of Pakistan. It was abolished in the 2018 delimitations after merging it with NA-209 and creating the new constituency of NA-197. This step was mainly done in view of Kashmore's elevation to district level in 2004 and the results of the 2017 census.

== Election 2002 ==
General elections were held on 10 October 2002. Sardar Saleem Jan Khan Mazari of National Alliance won by 82,810 votes.

General election 2002: NA-210 (Kashmore)
Party	Candidate	Votes	%	±%
NA	Sardar Saleem Jan Khan Mazari	82,810	62.72	
PPP	Mir Imran Khan Bijarani	39,743	30.10	
MMA	Abdul Hafiz Bijarani	8,087	6.13	
Others	Others (eight candidates)	1,396	1.05	
Turnout		137,367	47.47	
Total valid votes		132,036	96.12	
Rejected ballots		5,331	3.88	
Majority		43,067	32.62	
Registered electors		289,394		

== Election 2008 ==
General elections were held on 18 February 2008. Nasrullah Khan Bijarani of PML-Q won by 82,189 votes.

General election 2008: NA-210 (Kashmore)
Party	Candidate	Votes	%	±%
PML(Q)	Nasrullah Khan Bijarani	56,515	56.38	
PPP	Shaheryar Khan	43,122	43.02	
Others	Others (nine candidates)	599	0.60	
Turnout		103,319	35.35	
Total valid votes		100,236	97.02	
Rejected ballots		3,083	2.98	
Majority		13,393	13.36	
Registered electors		292,284		

== By-Election 2008 ==
By-Election 2008: NA-210 (Kashmore)
Party	Candidate	Votes	%	±%
PPP	Gul Muhammad Jakhrani	82,189	96.92	
JUI-S	Asghar Ali Khan Bajrani	2,286	2.70	
Others	Others (three candidates)	328	0.38	
Turnout		86,322	29.53	
Total valid votes		84,801	98.24	
Rejected ballots		1,521	1.76	
Majority		79,903	94.22	
Registered electors		292,284		

== Election 2013 ==
General elections were held on 11 May 2013. Ehsan ur Rehman Mazari of PPP won by 55,808 votes and became the member of National Assembly.

General election 2013: NA-210 (Kashmore)
Party	Candidate	Votes	%	±%
PPP	Insan Ur Rahman Mazari	55,808	56.09	
Independent	Mir Ghalib Hussain Khan Domki	24,033	24.15	
PML(F)	Sardar Mir Hakim Ali Knan Sundrani	10,347	10.40	
Independent	Mir Irfan Ali Knan Bijarani	6,190	6.22	
Others	Others (twenty one candidates)	3,123	3.14	
Turnout		104,605	41.51	
Total valid votes		99,501	95.12	
Rejected ballots		5,104	4.88	
Majority		31,775	31.94	
Registered electors		251,995		
