= Chris Steele-Perkins =

British photographer (1947–2025)

- Born: Christopher Horace Steele-Perkins; 28 July 1947; Rangoon, Colony of Burma
- Died: 8 September 2025 (aged 78); Japan
- Occupation: Social documentary photographer

Christopher Horace Steele-Perkins (28 July 1947 – 8 September 2025) was a British photographer and member of Magnum Photos, best known for his depictions of Africa, Afghanistan, England, Northern Ireland, and Japan.

== Life and career ==
Steele-Perkins was born in Rangoon, Burma, on 28 July 1947, to a British father and a Burmese mother; but his father left his mother and took the boy to England at the age of two. He grew up in Burnham-on-Sea. He went to Christ's Hospital and for one year studied chemistry at the University of York before leaving for a stay in Canada. Returning to Britain, he joined the University of Newcastle upon Tyne, where he served as photographer and picture editor for a student magazine. After graduating in psychology in 1970 he started to work as a freelance photographer, specializing in the theatre, while he also lectured in psychology.

By 1971, Steele-Perkins had moved to London and become a full-time photographer, with particular interest in urban issues, including poverty. He went to Bangladesh in 1973 to take photographs for relief organizations; some of this work was exhibited in 1974 at the Camerawork Gallery (London). In 1973–74, he taught photography at the Stanhope Institute and the North East London Polytechnic.

In 1975, Steele-Perkins joined the Exit Photography Group with the photographers Nicholas Battye and Paul Trevor, and there continued his examination of urban problems: Exit's earlier booklet Down Wapping had led to a commission by the Calouste Gulbenkian Foundation to increase the scale of their work, and in six years they produced 30,000 photographs as well as many hours of taped interviews. This led to the 1982 book, Survival Programmes. Steele-Perkins' work included depiction from 1975 to 1977 of street festivals, and prints from London Street Festivals were bought by the British Council and exhibited with Homer Sykes' Once a Year and Patrick Ward's Wish You Were Here; Steele-Perkins' depiction of Notting Hill has been described as being in the vein of Tony Ray-Jones.

Steele-Perkins became an associate of the French agency Viva in 1976, and three years after this, he published his first book, The Teds, an examination of teddy boys that is now considered a classic of documentary and even fashion photography. He curated photographs for the Arts Council collection, and co-edited a collection of these, About 70 Photographs.

In 1977, he made a brief detour into "conceptual" photography, working with the photographer Mark Edwards to collect images from the ends of rolls of 35mm film taken by themselves and others. (These were exposures taken immediately after loading a fresh film and without focusing or aiming, in order to wind along the fogged film leader and ensure that the film in position for the first wanted exposure was unfogged.) Forty were exhibited in "Film Ends".

Work documenting poverty in Britain took Steele-Perkins to Belfast, which he found to be poorer than Glasgow, London, Middlesbrough, or Newcastle, as well as experiencing "a low-intensity war".

Of his experiences in Northern Ireland, he was quoted as saying: "I intended to cover the situation from the standpoint of the underdog, the downtrodden: I was not neutral and was not interested in capturing it so... I began to see that my work in Northern Ireland had always been a celebration of the resilience and unyielding way that the Catholic community resisted."

He stayed in the Catholic Lower Falls area, first squatting and then living in the flat of a man he met in Belfast. His photographs of Northern Ireland appeared in a 1981 book written by Wieland Giebel. Thirty years later, he returned to the area to find that its residents had new problems and fears; the later photographs appear within Magnum Ireland. Both the earlier and the later photographs are collected in The Troubles (2021).

Steele-Perkins photographed wars and disasters in the Third World, leaving Viva in 1979 to join Magnum Photos as a nominee (on encouragement by Josef Koudelka), and becoming an associate member in 1981 and a full member in 1983. He continued to work in Britain, taking photographs published as The Pleasure Principle, an examination (in colour) of life in Britain but also a reflection of himself. With Peter Marlow, he successfully pushed for the opening of a London office for Magnum; the proposal was approved in 1986.

Steele-Perkins made four trips to Afghanistan in the 1990s, sometimes staying with the Taliban, the majority of whom "were just ordinary guys" who treated him courteously. Together with James Nachtwey and others, he was also fired on, prompting him to reconsider his priorities: in addition to the danger of the front line:

. . . you never get good pictures out of it. I've yet to see a decent front-line war picture. All the strong stuff is a bit further back, where the emotions are.

A book of his black and white images, Afghanistan, was published first in French, and later in English and in Japanese. The review in the Spectator read in part:

These astonishingly beautiful photographs are more moving than can be described; they hardly ever dwell on physical brutalities, but on the bleak rubble and desert of the country, punctuated by inexplicable moments of formal beauty, even pastoral bliss . . . the grandeur of the images comes from Steele-Perkins never neglecting the human, the individual face in the great crowd of history.

— Philip Hensher

The book and the travelling exhibition of photographs were also reviewed favorably in the Guardian, Observer, Library Journal, and London Evening Standard.

Steele-Perkins served as the President of Magnum from 1995 to 1998. One of the annual meetings over which he presided was that of 1996, to which Russell Miller was given unprecedented access as an outsider and which Miller has described in some detail.

With his second wife the presenter and writer Miyako Yamada (山田美也子), whom he married in 1999, Steele-Perkins had spent much time in Japan, publishing two books of photographs: Fuji, a collection of views and glimpses of the mountain inspired by Hokusai's Thirty-six Views of Mount Fuji; and Tokyo Love Hello, scenes of life in the city. Between these two books he also published a personal visual diary of the year 2001, Echoes.

Work in South Korea included a contribution to a Hayward Gallery touring exhibition of photographs of contemporary slavery, "Documenting Disposable People", in which Steele-Perkins interviewed and made black-and-white photographs of Korean "comfort women". "Their eyes were really important to me: I wanted them to look at you, and for you to look at them", he wrote. "They're not going to be around that much longer, and it was important to give this show a history." The photographs were published within Documenting Disposable People: Contemporary Global Slavery. (Note: For bibliographic detail see the list of publications. Samples can be seen in Chris Steele-Perkins, "Comfort Women", The Drawbridge, no. 13 (Summer 2009). Retrieved 13 January 2010.)

Steele-Perkins returned to England for a project by the Side Gallery on Durham's closed coalfields (exhibited within "Coalfield Stories"); after this work ended, he stayed on to work on a depiction (in black and white) of life in the north-east of England, published as Northern Exposures.

In 2008, Steele-Perkins won an Arts Council England grant for "Carers: The Hidden Face of Britain", a project to interview those caring for their relatives at home, and to photograph the relationships. Some of this work has appeared in The Guardian, and also in his book England, My England, a compilation of four decades of his photography that combines photographs taken for publication with much more personal work: he does not see himself as having a separate personality when at home. "By turns gritty and evocative," wrote a reviewer in The Guardian, "it is a book one imagines that Orwell would have liked very much."

His archive will be held with the Bodleian Libraries.

Steele-Perkins had two sons, Cedric, born 16 November 1990, and Cameron, born 18 June 1992. With his marriage to Miyako Yamada, he had a stepson, Daisuke and a granddaughter, Momoe. He died in Japan on 8 September 2025, at the age of 78.

== Publications ==
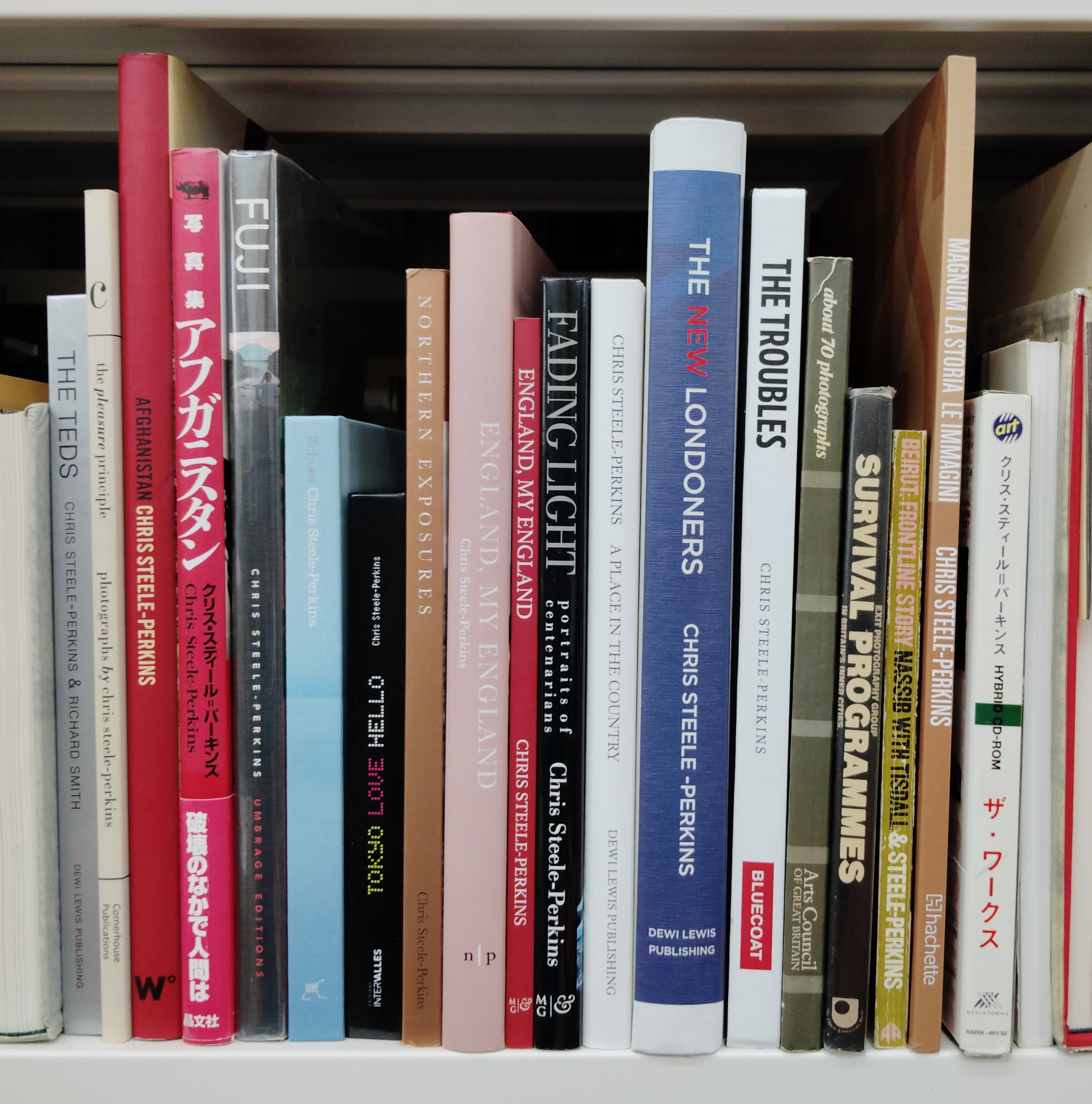
Books by Chris Steele-Perkins, whether alone or in collaboration; this copy of The Teds is the 2003 edition.

=== Photobooks by Steele-Perkins ===
- The Teds. London: Travelling Light/Exit, 1979; ISBN 0-906333-05-9. With text by Richard Smith.
  - New edition. Stockport: Dewi Lewis, 2003; ISBN 1-899235-44-2.
  - Revised larger format edition. Stockport: Dewi Lewis, 2018; ISBN 978-1-911306-05-4
- The Pleasure Principle. Manchester: Cornerhouse Books, 1989; ISBN 0-948797-50-9
- Afghanistan. London: Westzone Publishing, 2000; ISBN 1-903391-13-X (Note: "Afghanistan", The New Yorker, 1 October 2001. Retrieved 15 March 2009.)
  - Afghanistan. Paris: Marval, 2000;ISBN 2862342971 (in French)
  - Afuganisutan: Shashinshū (アフガニスタン 写真集) / Afghanistan. Tokyo: Shōbunsha, 2001; ISBN 4794965168 (in Japanese)
- Fuji: Images of Contemporary Japan. New York: Umbrage; London: Turnaround, 2002; ISBN 1-884167-12-8
- Echoes. London: Trolley, 2003; ISBN 1-904563-11-2
- Tokyo Love Hello. Paris: Editions Intervalles, 2006; ISBN 2916355057 Photographs taken in Tokyo, 1997–2006. With an introduction by Donald Richie, texts and captions in French and English.
- Northern Exposures: Rural Life in the North East. Newcastle upon Tyne: Northumbria University Press, 2007; ISBN 1-904794-20-3. Black and white photographs taken from 2002 and after.
- England, My England: A Photographer's Portrait. Newcastle upon Tyne: Northumbria Press, 2009; ISBN 1-904794-38-6. Photographs 1969–2009, combining the documentary and the personal.
  - England, My England: A Magnum Photographer's Portrait. Carmarthen: McNidder & Grace, 2023; ISBN 9781904794387. Reworked, paperback edition, with an introduction by David Elliott.
- Fading Light: Portraits of Centenarians. Alnwick: McNidder & Grace, 2012; ISBN 978-0-85716-032-4.
- A Place in the Country. Stockport: Dewi Lewis, 2014; ISBN 978-1-907893-62-9 (Note: Dewi Lewis's page about A Place in the Country.)
- The New Londoners. Stockport: Dewi Lewis, 2019; ISBN 978-1-911306-45-0 (Note: Website about the book and related exhibitions. Dewi Lewis's page about The New Londoners.)
- The Troubles. [Liverpool]: Bluecoat Press, 2021. With an essay by Paul McCorry; ISBN 9781908457653 (Note: Bluecoat Press's page about The Troubles.)

=== Zines by Steele-Perkins ===
- Wolverhampton 1978. Southport: Café Royal Books, 2019. With an introduction by Francis Hodgson. Edition of 500. (Note: Café Royal Books' page about Wolverhampton 1978.)
- Brixton 1973–1975. Southport: Café Royal Books, 2019. With an introduction by Francis Hodgson. Edition of 250. (Note: Café Royal Books' page about Brixton 1973–1975.)

=== Other book contributions ===
- Young British Photographers. London: Co-optic Photography, [1975]. Photographs by, among others, Valerie Wilmer, Brian Griffin, Paddy Summerfield, Homer Sykes, and Simon Marsden. Co-edited with Mark Edwards.
- About 70 Photographs. London: Arts Council of Great Britain, 1980; ISBN 0-7287-0208-8 (paperback); ISBN 0-7287-0209-6 (hardback). Steele-Perkins and William Messer comment on about seventy photographs by other photographers.
- La Grèce au présent, ed. Luce M. Albiges. Paris: Bibliothèque Publique d'Information, Centre Georges Pompidou, 1981. (in French) Exhibition catalogue, works by various photographers.
- Das kurze Leben des Brian Stewart: Alltag im irischen Bürgerkrieg. West Berlin: Elefanten Press, 1981; ISBN 3-88520-051-1. Text by Wieland Giebel. Steele-Perkins contributes eighteen (18) photographs.
- El Salvador: Work of Thirty Photographers, ed. Carolyn Forché et al. New York: Writers & Readers, 1982; ISBN 0-86316-064-6 (paperback); ISBN 0-86316-063-8.
- Survival Programmes: in Britain's Inner Cities (with Nicholas Battye and Paul Trevor, as the Exit Photography Group). Milton Keynes: Open University Press, 1982; ISBN 0-335-10111-9.
- Beirut: Frontline Story. London: Pluto Press; Trenton, N.J.: Africa World Press, 1983; ISBN 0-86104-397-9. Text by Selim Nassib and Caroline Tisdall, photographs by Steele-Perkins.
- The Indelible Image: Photographs of War, 1846 to the Present, ed. Frances Fralin. New York: Abrams, 1985; ISBN 0-8109-1110-8. Catalogue of the exhibition at the Corcoran Gallery.
- In Our Time: The World as Seen by Magnum Photographers. New York: Norton, 1989; ISBN 0-393-02767-8. London: André Deutsch, 1993; ISBN 0-233-98822-X. Text by William Manchester et al.
- Way to Gods: Magunamu Foto: Kumano kodō, Santiago e no michi (WAY to GODS マグナム フォト 熊野古道 サンティアゴへの道), ed. Nagasaka Yoshimitsu (永坂嘉光). Tokyo: Kawade Kobō Shinsha, 1999; ISBN 4-309-90293-6. (in Japanese) (Additional title on front cover: Ancient Kumano Roads and Roads to Santiago.) Contains photographs by Steele-Perkins of Kumano Kodō (pp. 103–120); as well as photographs of Kumano kodō by Elliott Erwitt and Peter Marlow, and of camino de Santiago by Marlow and Harry Gruyaert.
- Magnum°. London: Phaidon, 2000; ISBN 0-7148-9065-0. (Also called Magnum Degrees.) Steele-Perkins edited this collection of work by Magnum photographers during the last decade or so of the twentieth century. His own photographs of Tiananmen Square, the effects of war in Somalia, Uganda and Afghanistan, and the work of Abdul Sattar Edhi are included.
- Arms against Fury: Magnum Photographers in Afghanistan, ed. Robert Dannin. New York: PowerHouse, 2002; ISBN 1-57687-151-7; London: Thames & Hudson, 2002; ISBN 0-500-54263-5.
- Magnum Football (distributed in the US as Magnum Soccer). London: Phaidon, 2002; ISBN 0-7148-4236-2. London: Phaidon, 2005; ISBN 0-7148-4521-3. With other Magnum photographers. Contains eight photographs by Steele-Perkins.
- The Face of Human Rights, ed. Walter Kälin et al. Baden, Switzerland: Lars Müller, 2004; ISBN 3-03778-017-7. Steele-Perkins contributes ten or more photographs.
- Magnum Stories, ed. Chris Boot. London: Phaidon, 2004; ISBN 0714842451. Steele-Perkins' story on famine in Somalia in August 1992 appears with an introduction by him on pp. 442–49.
- Magnum Ireland, ed. Brigitte Lardinois and Val Williams. New York: Thames & Hudson, 2005; ISBN 0-500-54303-8. With other Magnum photographers. Steele-Perkins' 1978 photographs of West Belfast are on pp. 116–23; his photographs of the Milltown Cemetery attack (West Belfast, 1988) are on pp. 160–63.
- Euro visions: Chypre, Estonie, Hongrie, Lettonie, Lituanie, Malte, Pologne, République Tchèque, Slovaquie, Slovenie par dix photographes de Magnum. Paris: Magnum, 2005; ISBN 2-84426-293-7.
  - Magnum Photos: Euro Visions, the New Europeans by Ten Magnum Photographers. Göttingen: Steidl, 2006; ISBN 3-86521-223-9. English translation. Steele-Perkins' photographs of Slovakia appear on pp. 152–61, with one page for each of ten themes; an interview with him precedes the photographs. (Note: For comments on Steele-Perkins' work, see John Petrenko, "Chris Steele-Perkins", John Petrenko Photography and Art Blog, 2 November 2009. Retrieved 21 January 2010.)
- United Opus, ed. Justyn Barnes. London: Kraken Opus, 2006; ISBN 1-905794-03-7, ISBN 1-905794-00-2. With other photographers and writers. A book about Manchester United F.C.
- How We Are: Photographing Britain from the 1840s to the Present, ed. Val Williams and Susan Bright. London: Tate Publishing, 2007; ISBN 978-1-85437-714-2.
- Magunamu ga totta Tōkyō (マグナムが撮った東京) / Tokyo Seen by Magnum Photographers. Tokyo: Magnum Photos Tokyo, 2007.
- Magnum Magnum: with 413 photographs in colour and duotone, ed. Brigitte Lardinois. London: Thames & Hudson, 2007; ISBN 978-0-500-54342-9. London: Thames & Hudson, 2008; ISBN 0-500-54366-6 (in English) pp. 144–49 is a selection of Steele-Perkins' photographs by Bruno Barbey; elsewhere, he presents a selection of photographs taken by Alex Webb.
- Ces images qui nous racontent le monde, ed. Éric Godeau. Paris: Albin Michel, 2007; ISBN 2-226-15219-9 (in French). With other Magnum photographers.
- Darfur: Twenty Years of War and Genocide in Sudan, ed. Leora Kahn. New York: PowerHouse, 2007; ISBN 1-57687-385-4 (hard). New York: PowerHouse, 2008; ISBN 1-57687-415-X (paper). Photographs taken by Steele-Perkins in 1991 and by seven others.
- Documenting Disposable People: Contemporary Global Slavery. London: Hayward Publishing, 2008; ISBN 978-1-85332-264-8. The book of the exhibition.
- Korea: As Seen by Magnum Photographers. New York: Norton, 2009; ISBN 978-0-393-06774-3. Steele-Perkins was one of twenty photographers who combined to photograph South Korea from 2006 to 2007.
- Chris Steele-Perkins Issue 44 (October 2019) of Magnum La Storia Le Immagini (ISSN 2532-733X). Milan: Hachette Fascicoli. With texts by Rosa Carnevale and David Clark.

=== CD-ROMs ===
- Za Wākusu (ザ・ワークス) / The Works. Tokyo: Media Towns, 1999. 180 photographs by Steele-Perkins, from 1980 to 1994, of Chad, Ethiopia, Kenya, Namibia, Somalia, South Africa, Sudan, Tanzania, Uganda, Zaire and Zimbabwe.

=== Archives ===
- Catalogue of the Survival Programmes papers held at LSE Archives

== Films ==
- Video Diaries: Dying for Publicity. 1993, 70 minutes. Steele-Perkins reflects on his reporting of and role in scenes of suffering.

== Exhibitions ==
=== Solo ===
- "The Face of Bengal". Camerawork Gallery (London), 1974.
- "The Teds". Camerawork Gallery (London), 1979.
- "Beirut". Camerawork Gallery (London), 1983.
- "Famine in Africa". Barbican Art Gallery (London), 1985.
- "Lebanon". Magnum Gallery (Paris), 1985.
- "South Africa". Fnac (Paris), 1986.
- "The Pleasure Principle". Fnac (Paris), 1990.
- Photographs of Britain. Aperture Foundation (New York), May 1991.
- "Africa, Work in Progress". Visa pour l'image (Perpignan), 1992.
- "Nomansland". Photo Gallery International (Tokyo), August–September 1999.
- "Afghanistan". Visa pour l'image (Perpignan), 1999.
- "Notes from Afghanistan". Side Gallery (Newcastle), September–October 2000. Ffotogallery (Cardiff), August (?) – September 2000.
- "Fuji". Midlands Arts Centre (Birmingham), January–March 2002.
- "Photographs of Mt Fuji". Aberystwyth Arts Centre (Aberystwyth), May–June 2002.
- "Fuji". Impressions Gallery (York), August–September 2002.
- "Fuji". Granship (Shizuoka City), May–June 2002.
- "The Teds". Gallery 292 (New York City), March 2003.
- "The Teds: From the Originals to the Plastics". Stephen Daiter Gallery (Chicago), January–February 2004.
- "Echoes". Leica Gallery Tokyo (Ginza, Tokyo), August–September 2005.
- "Hinterland". Side Gallery (Newcastle), April–May 2006.
- "Haswell Plough to Harajuku". Host Gallery (London), June–July 2007.
- "Northern Exposures". Northumbria University Gallery, 2007.
- "Fuji". Porta Praetoria (Aosta), as part of the Mountain Photo Festival, August–September 2008.
- "England My England". Kings Place Gallery (London), June–July 2010.
- "For Love of the Game". Third Floor Gallery (Cardiff), June–July 2010. Photographs of football in Japan, England, and Ghana.
- "Northern Exposures". Galleries Inc at Central Square North (Newcastle), January–February 2011.
- "The Pleasure Principle". Open Eye Gallery (Liverpool), November–December 2011.
- "Centenarians". University Gallery, Northumbria University (Newcastle), October–November 2012.

=== Group or shared ===
- "The Inquisitive Eye". ICA (London), 1974.
- "Il Regno Unito si diverte". British Council, Milan, 1981. (With Homer Sykes and Patrick Ward.)
- "Maritime England". Photographers' Gallery (London), 1982.
- "The Other Britain". National Theatre (London), and touring in Britain, 1982.
- "El Salvador: Work of Thirty Photographers". ICP (New York), 1984.
- "The Indelible Image". Corcoran Gallery (Washington, D.C.), 1985.
- "In Our Time". A Magnum Photos exhibition. World tour, 1990.
- "A Terrible Beauty". Artists Space (New York), 1994.
- "Our Turning World". Barbican Art Gallery (London), December 1999 – March 2000. With other Magnum photographers.
- "Magnum Style". Staley-Wise Gallery (New York), April–June 2004. ("Style is evident in body language, original dress, and physical beauty"; with other Magnum photographers.)
- "Acqua fonte di vita". Fondazione Luciana Matalon (Milan), May–June 2004. (With ten other photographers.) An exhibition showing the importance of water.
- "Magnum Football". Millennium Point (Birmingham), May–August 2004. (With other Magnum photographers.) And (also as "Planet Football", "Weltsprach Fußball", "Världsspråket fotboll" and "Fotbollens språk") at many other places around the world until 2008.
- "Magnum Stories". The Guardian Newsroom (London), November–December 2004. With many other Magnum photographers; an exhibition to coincide with publication of the book Magnum Stories.
- Exhibition of new acquisitions, Galleria Fnac Milano (Milan), May–June 2005.
- "NorthSouthEastWest: A 360° View of Climate Change". (With nine other Magnum photographers.) Science Museum (London), March 2005; and many cities worldwide until 2006.
- "Teenage Kicks: The Mods 'n' Rockers Generation". Photographers' Gallery (London), 2005–2007.
- "Euro Visions: The New Europeans as Seen by Magnum Photographers". Centre Georges Pompidou (Paris), September–October 2005. Steele-Perkins presented photographs of Slovakia. Ujazdów Castle (Warsaw), October–November 2006.
- "El Salvador: Work of Thirty Photographers". ICP (New York), September–November 2005. The exhibition of 1984.
- "Euro Visions: The New Europeans by Twelve Magnum Photographers". Royal Museums of Fine Arts of Belgium (Brussels), March–July 2007. The earlier exhibition augmented by photographs (by Bruno Barbey and Paolo Pellegrin) of Bulgaria and Romania.
- "The Coast Exposed". Queen's House (Greenwich, London), and smaller versions elsewhere in the UK.
- "I Shot Norman Foster". The Yard (The Architecture Foundation, London), November 2005 – January 2006. The architecture of Norman Foster. Steele-Perkins photographed the London Gherkin, "hiding it within the chaos of the City's streets, in similar fashion to his Mount Fuji series".
- "After Image: Social Documentary Photography in the 20th century". NGV International (Melbourne), November 2006 – April 2007. A number of photographers, from the 1870s to the 1980s.
- "Survival Programmes: In Britain's Inner Cities Between 1974 and 1979". (With Nicholas Battye and Paul Trevor.) Side Gallery (Newcastle), January–March 2007.
- "Tokyo Seen by Magnum Photographers". Tokyo Metropolitan Museum of Photography (Ebisu, Tokyo), March–May 2007.
- "To the Dogs". Presentation House Gallery (Vancouver), June–August 2007.
- "No Such Thing as Society: Photography in Britain 1968–1987." Aberystwyth Arts Centre, March 2008; Tullie House (Carlisle), May 2008; Ujazdów Castle (Warsaw), November 2008.
- "Darfur: Photojournalists Respond." With Lynsey Addario, Pep Bonet, Colin Finlay, Ron Haviv, Olivier Jobard, Kadir van Lohuizen, and Sven Torfinn. Holocaust Museum Houston, March–August 2008. JFK High School (Plainview, New York), Boston Public Library, University of Arkansas (Fayetteville), Idaho Historical Museum (Boise), Illinois Holocaust Museum and Education Center (Skokie), University of New Hampshire (Durham), Barness Family Jewish Community Center (Chandler, Arizona), 2008–10.
- "Bitter Fruit: Pictures from Afghanistan". (With other Magnum photographers.) Magnum Print Room (London), 2009.
- "Disposable People: Contemporary Global Slavery". (With seven other Magnum photographers.) Southbank Centre (London), and five other locations in England and Wales, 2009–2010. Steele-Perkins shows portraits of Korean "comfort women".
- "The Other Britain Revisited: Photographs from New Society". Victoria and Albert Museum (London), May–September 2010.
- "Facts of Life / British Documentary Photography". Photomonth, National Museum, Kraków, August–November 2010. British photography 1974–1997.
- "Mass Photography: Blackpool through the Camera", Grundy Art Gallery (Blackpool), 2011.
- "Dokyumentarī Fuji" (ドキュメンタリー富士) / "Documentary Fuji", Shizuoka City Tokaido Hiroshige Museum of Art (Shizuoka City), July–September 2013. An exhibition of photographs by Steele-Perkins and prints by Hiroshige.

=== As co-curator ===
- "Young British Photographers". Photographers' Gallery (London), 1975. (Co-curator, with Mark Edwards.)
- "Film Ends". Travelling in Britain, 1977. (Co-selector, with Mark Edwards.)

== Collections ==
- Arts Council of Great Britain
- Photographers' Gallery (London)
- British Library of Political and Economic Science (London)
- Victoria and Albert Museum (London)
- Tate (London and elsewhere)
- Side Gallery (Newcastle)
- National Media Museum (Bradford)
- National Portrait Gallery (London)
- Irish Museum of Modern Art (Dublin)
- Bibliothèque nationale de France (Paris)
- Fnac (Paris)
- Tokyo Fuji Art Museum (Hachiōji, Tokyo)
- National Gallery of Victoria (Melbourne)
- Corcoran Gallery of Art (Washington, DC)

== Awards ==
- 1988: Oskar Barnack Award (Leica and World Press Photo), for a story on Thalidomide victims
- 1988: Tom Hopkinson Prize for British Photojournalism (Photographers' Gallery)
- 1989: Robert Capa Gold Medal (International Center of Photography)
- 2000: World Press Photo award, "Daily Life" category
- 2008: Terence Donovan Award (Royal Photographic Society)
- 2009: Shortlisted for the Prix Pictet for Mount Fuji
- 2014: Honorary Fellowship of The Royal Photographic Society.
