= Fariha Razzaq Haroon =

Pakistani politician and journalist (1956–2018)

Fariha Razak Haroon

Member of the Provincial Assembly of Sindh
- In office 2002–2007
- Constituency: Reserved seat for women

Personal details
- Born: 15 November 1956 Toba Tek Singh
- Died: 1 February 2018 (aged 61) Karachi, Pakistan
- Party: Pakistan Peoples Party
- Spouse: Hazar Khan Bijarani (m. 2008)
- Parent: Nishat Afza (mother)

Fariha Razak Haroon (15 November 1956 – 1 February 2018) was a Pakistani politician and journalist who was a member of the Provincial Assembly of Sindh from 2002 to 2007. She became the first Pakistani writer to be recognised by the International Federation of Journalists. Her writing also earned her and Pakistan for the first time the prized European Commission's "Lorenzo Natali Prize for Journalism" in 2000.

== Early life and education ==
Fariha Razak Haroon was the daughter of an eminent civil engineer Abdul Razaq, who worked as a Chief Engineering Advisor to the Saudi Royal Air Force, after retirement as an Engineer in Chief Directorate of the Pakistan Army. He later went on to serve in politics and assisted Benazir Bhutto during her tenure as a Prime Minister. Fariha's mother Nishat Afza was a poet and an eminent social worker, graduated from Punjab University. During her time in the Punjab Assembly, she moved many private bills and motions for human rights and for the underprivileged. She hailed from Toba Tek Singh where her family was operating a radio station since 2007.

Fariha completed her schooling from Convent of Jesus and Mary, Murree, as a high performing student she excelled in studies, as well as sports. She was captain of the volleyball team and was also presented with a lifetime achievement award by the school for being an outstanding student and in recognition of her accomplishments.

She studied Communications & Journalism Innovation at Stanford University, USA, as well as English Literature and French from Kinnaird College in Lahore, Pakistan.

She also earned a fellowship in Social Justice & Democracy, at University College London, UK, and was an alumnus of the National Defence University, Islamabad.

She earned a bachelor of arts degree.

She was a journalist, who remained Director Public Relations with the Jang Group of Newspapers.

Razzaq married Hazar Khan Bijarani in 2008.

Her career as a writer won her various accolades as a journalist and human rights activist. Over a span of 30 years, she wrote more than 1,000 articles for national and international publications.

== Political career ==
She was nominated as the candidate of the Pakistan People's Party (PPP) for the reserved seats for women. She was elected to the Provincial Assembly of Sindh as a candidate for a reserved seat for women in the 2002 Pakistani general election.

As a member of the assembly, she took up significant social and human rights causes to support, specifically: Karo Kari, domestic violence, runaway marriages, child labour, women's rights and forced labour.

She was involved with multiple NGOs, including the Human Rights Commission of Pakistan, to support various significant causes. She held workshops and regularly toured the interior parts of the country to create awareness on transitional justice, conflict prevention, family planning, education, human rights and peace building.

== Awards and acknowledgments ==
She was honoured with the prestigious "Annual Muslim Award" by the House of Lords in 2003. This prestigious award is bestowed on behalf of the Queen of the United Kingdom.

She also received by the Prime Minister of Pakistan the "Madar-i-Millat Award" in 2003 for her selfless dedication to improve the status of the underprivileged in society.

In 2007, she was awarded the "Service to the Nation Award". She was recognised by the Pakistan British Trust on Pakistan's 60th year for the Power 100 list of Pakistani people, who have accomplished the very highest levels of achievement.

== Highest national award ==
On Independence Day, 14 August 2019, President of Pakistan approved the conferment of Pakistan Civil Award Tamgha-i-Imtiaz for her outstanding services to the State of Pakistan. This recognition was based on her work and services over the last three decades for highlighting human and especially women's rights in Pakistan.

== Death ==
On 1 February 2018, Fariha Razak Haroon was found dead in her home in Karachi along with her husband Hazar Khan Bijarani. Family and PPP have confirmed that the couple suffered gunshot wounds. Police said the death appeared to be a murder-suicide.
