= Abid Hussain Bhayo =

Pakistani politician

Member of the National Assembly of Pakistan
- In office 13 August 2018 – 10 August 2023
- Constituency: NA-198 (Shikarpur-I)

Member of the Provincial Assembly of Sindh
- In office August 2013 – 28 May 2018

Personal details
- Party: PPP (2013-present)

Abid Hussain Bhayo is a Pakistani politician who had been a Member of the National Assembly of Pakistan from August 2018 till August 2023. Previously he was a member of the Provincial Assembly of Sindh, from August 2013 to May 2018.

== Political career ==
He was elected to the Provincial Assembly of Sindh as a candidate of Pakistan Peoples Party (PPP) from Constituency PS-12 Shikarpur-II in by-polls held in August 2013.

He was elected to the National Assembly of Pakistan as a candidate of PPP from Constituency NA-198 (Shikarpur-I) in the 2018 Pakistani general election.
