= Nudrat Afza =

British photographer (born 1955)

Nudrat Afza (born 1955) is an India-born British photographer who documents community life in and near Bradford, where she lives.

== Life and career ==
Afza was born in Rawalpindi in 1955. She moved to Bradford in 1964 with her mother and two of her five siblings, where she later said, "I missed out on my education because new arrivals to Britain went to immigrant classes/centres that separated me from mainstream schooling, as well as prejudice [...] and racism in the education system". She trained in nursing and social work, and worked in that field until 1986.

Afza has no formal training in art or photography. In 1986, she received a grant from Yorkshire Arts to document the Bangladeshi community in Bradford. From 1989 to 1990 she worked on an exhibition at Huddersfield Art Gallery about South Asian communities in Kirklees.

A single mother of a disabled daughter, Afza cannot afford her own camera or equipment. Her work as a photographer is a "sporadically-engaged hobby" that she can only do when she receives a grant or residency.

In 2012, she photographed the last months of a Bradford salon before its owner's retirement. The work was exhibited at the University of Bradford.

For her series City Girls, she photographed female fans of Bradford City in the Valley Parade stadium in black and white, using a Hasselblad Xpan camera given to her by Bradford screenwriter Simon Beaufoy.

From 2018 to 2019, Afza, a Muslim, photographed the members of the Bradford Tree of Life Synagogue in Manningham, Bradford's last synagogue. Afza wanted to document the synagogue's culture, which had thrived in Bradford decades earlier. Under the title Kehillah (Hebrew for congregation or community), the photographs were exhibited in 2019. She is now an honorary member of the synagogue.

Beaufoy commented on Kehillah:

Like all the best art, the images reflect the artist: watchful, politely enquiring, melancholic with the hint of a smile. So unobtrusive is the photographer's eye, that it's easy to miss what is being explored. There is always warmth and empathy, but often a distant sound of thunder.

== Exhibitions ==
=== Solo and pair exhibitions ===
- Zones of Gold: For Emily. With Conrad Atkinson. Cartwright Hall, Bradford. September–November 1992.
- Midnight Hour. University of Bradford.
- The Salon. Gallery II, University of Bradford. September–November 2012.
- City Girls. National Science and Media Museum, November 2017 – June 2018.
- Kehillah. Salts Mill, Saltaire, Bradford (Saltaire festival), September 2019.

=== Group exhibitions ===
- 5 Women. The Pavilion, Leeds, 1988–89.
- Fabled Territories: New Asian photography in Britain. City Art Gallery, Leeds, and touring. 1989.
- In Focus. Horizon Gallery, London, February–March 1990. With Mumtaj Karimjee, Zarina Bhimji and Pradipta Das.
- One Hundred Years of Cheetham and Broughton. Jewish Museum, Manchester, February–December 2001.
- Local People. City Park, Bradford. July–August 2019. With Ian Beesley, Shy Burhan, John Cade, Phil Jackson and Justin Leeming.

== Publications ==
- Kehillah. Stockport: Dewi Lewis, 2025. ISBN 978-1-916915-14-5. (Note: Kehillah on the publisher's website.)
