= Ali Jan Mazari =

Member of the National Assembly of Pakistan from Sindh (2024–2029)

- علی جان مزاری

Member of the National Assembly of Pakistan
- Incumbent
- Assumed office 29 February 2024
- Constituency: NA-191 Jacobabad-cum-Kashmore

Personal details
- Party: PPP (2024-present)

Ali Jan Mazari (Urdu: علی جان مزاری) is a Pakistani politician who has been a member of the National Assembly of Pakistan since February 2024.

== Political career ==
Mazari was elected to the National Assembly of Pakistan in the 2024 Pakistani general election from NA-191 Jacobabad-cum-Kashmore as a candidate of Pakistan People’s Party (PPP). He received 103,962 votes while runner-up Shahzain Khan, a candidate of Jamiat Ulema-e-Islam (F) (JUI(F)), received 100,652 votes.
