= Patrick Ward (photographer) =

British photographer (born 1937)

Patrick Ward (born 1937) is a British photographer who has published collections of his own work on British and other subjects as well as working on commissions for the press.

== Life and career ==
Ward became interested in photography while doing National Service when a friend sent him the book of The Family of Man. He started out as an assistant to the photographer John Chillingworth (previously at Picture Post), and his own work was published in "Manplan" at The Architectural Review, the Observer Magazine, the Sunday Times Magazine, and the Telegraph Magazine.

In his own time, Ward worked on a portrayal of the English at play that resulted in the book Wish You Were Here, published in 1976 by Gordon Fraser in a uniform edition with Homer Sykes' Once a Year. This was also an observation of the class divisions of England.

Ward was one of a number of photographers who contributed to Bill Jay's short-lived Album, and Jay credits his and David Hurn's generosity with saving him from starvation during that period.

Commenting on Wish You Were Here and Flags Flying (1977), Daniela Mrázková wrote that "Ward is not a reporter but rather [an] essayist who can relate serious matters in a totally unserious manner. . . ."

== Publications ==
=== Books of work by Ward ===
- Wish You Were Here: The English at Play. London: Gordon Fraser, 1976. ISBN 0-900406-70-4. With an introduction and commentary by James Cameron.
- Flags Flying. London: Gordon Fraser, 1977. ISBN 0-86092-000-3.
- Amsterdam. The Great Cities. Amsterdam: Time-Life, 1977. Text by Hans Koning.
  - Amsterdam. Die grossen Städte. Amsterdam: Time-Life, 1977. ISBN 90-6182-271-8. (in German)
  - Amsterdam. Les Grandes Cités. Amsterdam: Time-Life, 1977. (in French)
  - Amusuterudamu (アムステルダム) / Amsterdam. Raifu sekai no daitoshi. Tokyo: Time-Life, 1978. (in Japanese)
- Bike Riders. Harrow House, 1980. Text by various authors. ISBN 9780905663012
  - Bike Riders: Die weite Welt der schnellen Maschinen. Munich: Christian, 1980.ISBN 9783884720608 (in German)
  - Moto évasion: Un univers. Paris: EPA, 1981. ISBN 2-85120-117-4. (in French)
  - Bike riders: de wereld van de snelle machines. Amsterdam: De Lantaarn, 1981. ISBN 90-70485-01-X. (in Dutch)
- Sandhurst: The Royal Military Academy: 250 years. Shrewsbury: Harmony House, 1990. ISBN 0-916509-98-2. Text by David G. Chandler.
- Essentially English. London: Michael O'Mara, 2003. ISBN 1-84317-003-5. New edition self-published at blurb.com, 2008.
- Land of the Free: On the Road in 1980's America Self-published at blurb.com, 2008.
- Wish You Were Here: England at Play in the 1970's. Self-published at blurb.com, 2008.
- Jo and Laszlo's Wedding in a Field. Self-published at blurb.com, 2008.
- Christie's: London's Great Auction House. Self-published at blurb.com, 2010.
- Fallen Angels: Barcelona's Gaudi, Carnaval and Santa Eulalia. Self-published at blurb.com, 2010.
- Londoners! Self-published at blurb.com, 2010. Revised edition, self-published at blurb.com, 2010.
- The Thames: London's Great River from Source to Sea. Self-published at blurb.com, 2010.
- Being English. Liverpool: Bluecoat, 2014. ISBN 978-1908457219.

=== Zines of work by Ward ===
- Manplan One. Southport: Café Royal, 2015. Edition of 200 copies. (Note: Café Royal's page about Manplan One is here.)
- Manplan Two. Southport: Café Royal, 2015. Edition of 200 copies. (Note: Café Royal's page about Manplan Two is here.)
- The Miners. Southport: Café Royal, 2015. Edition of 200 copies. (Note: Café Royal's page about The Miners is here.)
- The Dirty Dozen. Southport: Café Royal, 2015. Edition of 200 copies. (Note: Café Royal's page about The Dirty Dozen is here.)
- Bonfire Societies. Southport: Café Royal, 2016. Edition of 150 copies. (Note: Café Royal's page about Bonfire Societies is here.)

=== Other book appearances ===
- Discovering Britain and Ireland. Washington, D.C.: National Geographic Books, 1985. ISBN 0-87044-598-7. ISBN 0-87044-599-5. Contributor.
- Jay, Bill. Photographers Photographed. Salt Lake City: Peregrine Smith, 1983. ISBN 0-87905-146-9. Ward is one of the photographers photographed.
- Lane, Barry, ed. British Image 2. London: Arts Council of Great Britain, 1976. ISBN 0-7287-0093-X. Ward's series "Games People Play", excerpted from Wish You Were Here, appears on pp. 67–77.
- Perry, Grayson, ed. Unpopular Culture: Grayson Perry Selects from the Arts Council Collection. London: Hayward, 2008. ISBN 1-85332-267-9.

== Group exhibitions ==
- "Il Regno Unito si diverte". British Council, Milan, 1981. (With Chris Steele-Perkins and Homer Sykes.)
- "The Other Britain". National Theatre (London), and touring in Britain, 1982.
- "There'll Always Be an England!" Stephen Daiter Gallery (Chicago), 2009.
- "The Other Britain Revisited". Victoria and Albert Museum (London), 2010.

== Permanent collections ==
- Arts Council
- Royal Institute of British Architects.
- Victoria and Albert Museum (London).
