= Salim Jan Khan Mazari =

Pakistani politician

Sardar Saleem Jan Khan Mazari (born 1940) is a Pakistan Peoples Party politician from Sindh, Pakistan.

Sardar Saleem Jan Mazari has been elected MPA for Kashmore on many occasions and has also served as a provincial minister for Sindh.

In October 2002, he contested elections for the National Assembly of Pakistan but later resigned and contested the Local Body Elections. Sardar Salim Jan Khan Mazari also served as the District Nazim of Kashmore. After his successful tenure as the District Nazim, Sardar Saleem Jan Mazari retired from the politics in 2010. He then setup his nephew Ahsaan Mazari to contest elections and ensured a win for him with his support.
