= Constituency NA-209 =

Former constituency of the National Assembly of Pakistan

Constituency NA-209 (Jacobabad-II)
- Former constituency for the National Assembly of Pakistan
- Region: Jacobabad District

Former constituency
- Created: 2002
- Abolished: 2018
- Replaced by: NA-197 (Kashmore)

Constituency NA-209 (Jacobabad-II) (Urdu: این اے-۲۰۹، جیکب آباد-۲) was a constituency for the National Assembly of Pakistan. It was abolished in the 2018 delimitations after merging it with NA-210 and creating the new constituency of NA-197. This step was mainly done in view of Kashmore's elevation to district level in 2004 and the results of the 2017 census.

== Election 2002 ==
General elections were held on 10 October 2002. Mir Hazar Khan Bijarani of PPP won by 52,613 votes.

General election 2002: NA-209 (Jacobabad-II)
| Party | Candidate | Votes | % | ±% |
|---|---|---|---|---|
| PPP | Mir Hazar Khan Bijarani | 52,613 | 56.67 | |
| PML(Q) | Abdul Raheem Khan Khoso | 39,024 | 42.04 | |
| Others | Others (four candidates) | 1,199 | 1.29 | |
| Turnout | | 95,835 | 34.06 | |
| Total valid votes | | 92,836 | 96.87 | |
| Rejected ballots | | 2,999 | 3.13 | |
| Majority | | 13,589 | 14.63 | |
| Registered electors | | 281,410 | | |

== Election 2008 ==
General elections were held on 18 February 2008. Mir Hazar Khan Bijarani of PPP won by 111,578 votes.

General election 2008: NA-209 (Jacobabad-II)
| Party | Candidate | Votes | % | ±% |
|---|---|---|---|---|
| PPP | Mir Hazar Khan Bijarani | 111,578 | 84.72 | |
| MMA | Ali Hassan Buriro | 12,041 | 9.14 | |
| PML(F) | Mir Naseer Khan Khoso | 7,385 | 5.61 | |
| Others | Others (five candidates) | 694 | 0.53 | |
| Turnout | | 133,755 | 47.13 | |
| Total valid votes | | 131,698 | 98.46 | |
| Rejected ballots | | 2,057 | 1.54 | |
| Majority | | 99,537 | 75.58 | |
| Registered electors | | 283,829 | | |

== Election 2013 ==
General elections were held on 11 May 2013. Mir Shabbir Ali Bijarani of PPP won by 54,881 votes and became the member of National Assembly.

General election 2013: NA-209 (Jacobabad-II)
| Party | Candidate | Votes | % | ±% |
|---|---|---|---|---|
| PPP | Mir Shabbir Ali Bijarani | 54,881 | 52.13 | |
| PML(F) | Mir Hassan Khan Khoso | 45,660 | 43.37 | |
| JI | Nasrullah Aziz | 2,669 | 2.54 | |
| Others | Others (six candidates) | 2,063 | 1.96 | |
| Turnout | | 111,197 | 46.62 | |
| Total valid votes | | 105,273 | 94.67 | |
| Rejected ballots | | 5,924 | 5.33 | |
| Majority | | 9,221 | 8.76 | |
| Registered electors | | 238,513 | | |
