= Mir Ghalib Hussain Domki =

Pakistan politician and tribal leader

Mir Ghalib Khan Domki or میر غالب خان ڈومکی is a politician and tribal leader in Sindh, Pakistan. Mir Ghalib Hussain Domki is chief Mukkaddim of Giloee clan of Domki tribe. Mir Ghalib Hussain Domki is one of the Wadera's of the Domki tribe in Sindh. He is elected as MPA from Kashmore District on PS-18 from 2008 to 2013

Mir Ghalib Hussain Domki was elected as MNA in 2000 and he was MPA and Minister in 1993-1996 (Ministry of Cultures and Youth Affairs) from PPP.

Mir Ghalib Hussain Domki's father Mir Shah Ali Khan Domki was also elected as a MPA and he was candidate from Independent and he was first who won the seat all over Sindh from PPP and after winning MPA seat he went to PPP as they invited him.

Khan Sahib Ali Bilawal Khan Domki the father of Mir Shah Ali Khan and the grand father of Mir Ghalib Hussain Domki. He was elected M.L.A before the independence of Pakistan. He was awarded the title of Khan Sahib by the British.
