= Harry Gruyaert =

Belgian photographer

Harry Gruyaert (born 1941) is a Belgian photographer known for his images of India, Morocco and Egypt as well as of the west of Ireland and for his use of colour. He is a member of Magnum Photos. His work has been published in a number of books, been exhibited widely and won the Kodak Prize.

== Life and work ==
Gruyaert was born in 1941 in Antwerp, Belgium. He studied at the School for Photo and Cinema in Brussels from 1959 to 1962. He began freelance work in Paris, while working as a director of photography for Flemish television.

In 1969 Gruyaert made his first trip to Morocco. The resulting work won him the Kodak Prize in 1976 and was published in the book Morocco in 1990. He travelled to India for the first time in 1976 and to Egypt in 1987.

In 1972 he photographed the Summer Olympic Games in Munich and the first Apollo flights as they were shown on a television set. This series, TV Shots, was first exhibited at the Delpire Gallery in 1974 and later elsewhere. It was published as a book in 2007.

Gruyaert joined Magnum Photos in 1982 and became a full member in 1986.

== Innovation and reception ==
Gruyaert was experimenting with Kodachrome colour film for his documentary work in the late 1960s, contemporary with work by Ernst Haas, William Eggleston and Joel Meyerwitz touted by US commentators as 'The New Color', though after that of other Americans Saul Leiter, Gordon Parks and Vivian Maier in the 1950s. With Alex Webb, he was one of the first in the Magnum agency to shoot entirely in colour when he was invited to join in 1982.

Wilco Versteeg, in reviewing his work in 2018 writes that;

"Harry Gruyaert’s intuitive and candid color work was not always understood in a world that looked skeptically at anything smacking of "street photography" and equated black-and-white photography with serious artistry well into the 1980s. He is now under renewed consideration as one of Europe’s most important photographers…No matter where he turns his eye, his work attests to a constant exploration of the potentialities of color in seemingly colorless urban environments.

"Gruyaert eschews anthropological pretensions. Mirroring surfaces and windows are abundant [and] attest to Gruyaert's self-subjected distance, while nonetheless situating the photographer as observer and frame-giver – the quintessential flâneur. Rather than explicating large political or societal issues through his work, he prefers to speak about the contradictions of reality through the quality of light, color, and contrast.

"Whether Gruyaert roams the streets of Antwerp, Las Vegas, Moscow, or Paris, it is not the need to document that drives him, bul his appetite for interpretation. He directs us toward the unsung joys and tragedies of realities that upon first observation seem barren and empty, but in fact are structured through colored planes and details."

== Publications ==
=== Publications by Gruyaert ===
- Lumières Blanches. Paris: Centre national de la photographie, 1986. ISBN 9782867540301. Introduction by Alain Macaire and text by Richard Nonas, translated into English by Brice Matthieussent. Published on the occasion of the Gruyaert exhibition at the Palais de Tokyo, 24 April–9 June 1986.
- Morocco
  - Morocco. Munich: Schirmer/Mosel, 1990. ISBN 9783888143922. With an interview by Brice Matthieussent.
  - Marruecos. Seville: Fundación de las Tres Culturas, 2009. ISBN 9788493628284. Text in English, French and Spanish, by Gerardo Ruiz-Rico Ruiz and Brice Mathieussent, translated by Francis Merino and Meriem Abdelaziz.
  - Maroc. Paris: Textuel, 2013. ISBN 978-2845974784.
- Made in Belgium. Paris: Nathan/Delpire, 2000. ISBN 9782851072016. Text by Hugo Claus, in Flemish and French.
- Rivages
  - Paris: Textuel, 2003. ISBN 978-2845970908. Preface by Charles-Arthur Boyer.
  - Paris: Textuel, 2008.
- Harry Gruyaert. Photo Poche series. Arles, France: Actes Sud, 2006. ISBN 978-2742761760.
- TV Shots. Göttingen: Steidl, 2007. ISBN 978-3865213754. With a text by Jean-Philippe Toussaint.
- Harry Gruyaert: Edges. Amsterdam: Mets & Schilt, 2009. ISBN 978-9053306161. Edited and with preface by Charles-Arthur Boyer.
- Moscow 1989-2009. Paris: Be-Pôles, 2010. ISBN 9782917004128. Text in French and English.
- Roots. Paris: Xavier Barral, 2012. ISBN 978-2365110235.
- Irish Summers. Gallery 51, 2020. ISBN 978-9463883245. Work made in Ireland between 1983 and 1984.

=== Publications with others ===
- Way to Gods: Magunamu Foto: Kumano kodō, Santiago e no michi (WAY to GODS マグナム フォト 熊野古道 サンティアゴへの道), ed. Nagasaka Yoshimitsu (永坂嘉光). Tokyo: Kawade Kobō Shinsha, 1999. ISBN 4-309-90293-6. (in Japanese) (Additional title on front cover: Ancient Kumano Roads and Roads to Santiago.) Contains photographs of Camino de Santiago by Gruyaert and Peter Marlow, and of Kumano kodō by Marlow, Elliott Erwitt and Chris Steele-Perkins.
- Nord-pas-de-Calais Picardie. Paris: National Geographic, 2004. ISBN 978-2845821385. Photographs by Gruyaert, French-language text by Marie Desplechin.
- Tour Granite. Paris: Xavier Barral, 2009. ISBN 978-2915173345. Photographs by Gruyaert and Jean Gaumy, text by Éric Reinhardt.
- McLaren, Stephen, (editor.); Magnum Photos (2019), Magnum streetwise : the ultimate collection of street photography, Thames and Hudson, ISBN 978-0-500-54507-2

== Exhibitions ==
=== Solo exhibitions ===
- 1974: TV Shots, Delpire Gallery, Paris.
- 2008: TV Shots, Phillips de Pury & Company, Cologne, Germany.
- 2008: TV Shots, installation, Paris Photo.
- 2012: Moscow 1989-2009. Moscow Biennale 2012, Le Manège, Moscow.
- 2012/2013: Roots, Le Botanique, Brussels.
- 2015: Harry Gruyaert, Magnum Photos, London, 15 September – 31 October 2015.
- 2018: Retrospectieve, Fotomuseum Antwerp, Antwerp, 9 March 2018 - 10 June 2018.

=== Exhibitions with others ===
- 1976: TV Shots: Photo Murals by Harry Gruyaert and Charles Goossens, International Center of Photography.
- 2012: Cartier-Bresson: A Question of Colour, Somerset House, London.

== Award ==
- 1976: Winner, Kodak Prize.

== Collections ==
Gruyaert's work is held in the following permanent collections:

- MAST, Foto/Industria, Bologna, Italy.
- Harry Ransom Center, University of Texas at Austin, TX.
- Bibliothèque Nationale de France, Paris.
- David Roberts collection, London.
