= Kandhkot Tehsil =

Coordinates: 28.244°N 69.181°E

Kandhkot Tehsil: تعلقہ كندھ كوٹ; تعلقہ ڪنڌڪوٽ
- Tehsil
- Location within Sindh Location within Pakistan
- Country: Pakistan
- Province: Sindh

Area
  - Tehsil: 654 km^{2} (253 sq mi)
- Elevation: 76 m (249 ft)

Population (2023 Census)
  - Tehsil: 407,592
  - Density: 623/km^{2} (1,610/sq mi)
  - Urban: 142,631 (34.99%)
  - Rural: 264,961 (65.01%)

Literacy (2023)
  - Literacy rate: 37.91%
- Time zone: UTC+5 (PST)
- Postal code: 79160
- Dialling code: 0722

Kandhkot (Sindhi: ڪنڌڪوٽ; Urdu: كندھ كوٹ) is a tehsil in Kashmore District in the Sindh province of Pakistan.

Kandhkot Tehsil comprises the following union councils:

U.C. No.	U.C. Name
1	Mulgulzar
2	Rasaldar
3	Jagirabad
4	Dolat Pur
5	Wakro
6	Akhero
7	Malheer
8	Haibat
9	Dadar
10	Mangi

== Demographics ==
=== Population ===
Historical population
Year	Pop.	±% p.a.
1951	99,642	—
1961	119,413	+1.83%
1972	186,036	+4.11%
1981	246,199	+3.16%
1998	217,447	−0.73%
2017	366,111	+2.78%
2023	407,592	+1.80%

As of the 2023 census, Kandhkot Tehsil had a population of 407,592. According to the 2017 census, the population of Kandhkot Tehsil is 366,484, up from 217,447 in the 1998 census, reflecting a population growth rate of 2.7%. However, in 1901, the population of Kandhkot was 48,723, of which 4,341 were Hindus. A per 1891 census the population of Kandhkot was approximately 30,369 souls.
