= Kashmore =

Kashmore کشمور
- City
- Location within Sindh Location within Pakistan
- Coordinates: 28.26°N 69.35°E
- Country: Pakistan
- Province: Sindh
- Division: Larkana
- District: Kashmore

Government
  - Type: Town Committee
  - Chairman: Vacant
  - Voice Chairman: Vacant
- Elevation: 66 m (217 ft)

Population (2023)
  - Total: 63,984
- Time zone: UTC+5 (PST)

Kashmore or Kashmor (Sindhi: ڪشمور, Urdu: کشمور), is a city and the administrative centre of Kashmore District located in the Sindh Province of Pakistan.

== Demographics ==
Population

Historical population
Year	Pop.	±%
1972	6,572	—
1981	12,102	+84.1%
1998	28,548	+135.9%
2017	55,908	+95.8%
2023	63,984	+14.4%

As of the 2023 census, Kashmore had a population of 63,984.

Languages

Languages of Kashmore City (2023 Census)
1. Sindhi (95.8%)
2. Balochi (2.50%)
3. Saraiki (0.90%)
4. Others (0.80%)

According to the 2023 census, Sindhi is spoken by 95.8% of the population of Kashmore city, followed by Balochi (2.5%), Saraiki (0.9%), and other languages (0.8%).

== Notable people ==
- Salim Jan Khan Mazari, MNA from the Pakistan Peoples Party
- Mir Hazar Khan Bijarani, former federal and provincial minister
- Mir Shabbir Ali Khan Bijarani, former provincial minister
- Mir Gul Muhammad Khan Jakhrani, MNA, Sindh Chief Minister's Advisor on Prisons and Chairman District Council Kashmor@Kabdhot

== See Also ==
- Thul
- Kandhkot
- Ghauspur
