= Ian Beesley =

British photographer (born 1954)

- Born: 1954 (age 71–72); Eccleshill, Bradford, England
- Occupation: Social documentary photographer

Ian Beesley (born 1954) is a British social documentary photographer who has focused on Northern England, particularly Bradford, since the late 1970s. He was course leader for the MA in photography at the University of Bolton. Beesley's work is held in the collections of the Science Museum Group and Smithsonian Institution. In 2012, he was awarded an Honorary Fellowship of the Royal Photographic Society.

== Life and work ==
Beesley was born in Eccleshill, Bradford. He studied at Bradford Art College and Bournemouth & Poole College of Art.

Since the late 1970s, he has documented the changing social landscape of Northern England, particularly in Bradford. He photographed Salts Mill in Saltaire as it was closing down in 1986. He spent five years working on the series The Art of Clubbing, about nightclub culture in the UK.

He was course leader for the MA in photography at the University of Bolton in Greater Manchester.

== Publications ==
=== Books ===
- Where Sky & Water Meet. Arts Council, 1982.
- Through the Mill. NMPFTV, 1987.
- Victorian Bradford. Ryburn, 1987.
- Now I can tell. McMillan, 1990.
- Warwickshire Hatters. Ryburn, 1988.
- Calderdale. Ryburn, 1988.
- Victorian Manchester & Salford. Ryburn, 1988.
- Leeds Architectural Heritage. Ryburn, 1993.
- A Place of Work. The Keeled University press, 1995.
- Claret & Amber. Darkroom/NMPFTV, 2000.
- Building Sights. Leeds City Council, 2001.
- The Power, the Pride, the Passion. Darkroom, 2001.
- Orphans of the Fallout. Darkroom, 2001.
- Heavy Metal. Darkroom, 2002.
- The End of the Shed. Darkroom, 2001.
- Meltdown Heads. together productions, 2004.
- Shining Out. Darkroom, 2006.
- The Leap. Darkroom, 2010.
- The Drift. NCME, 2011.
- T'Ales. Carlsberg/DRP, 2011.
- Born in Bradford. Incline, 2012.
  - Darkroom, 2014. With Ian McMillan. ISBN 978-0-9569049-3-5.
- The Book of damp. Darkroom, 2014. Photographs by Beesley, poems by Ian McMillan. ISBN 978-0-9569049-1-1.
- A box full of cuckoos. Darkroom, 2014.
- Magic Lantern Tales. Darkroom, 2014.
- Taraxacum Officinale. Darkroom, 2014.
- Grafters: Industrial Society in Image and Word. Unified Theory of Everything, 2016. Curated by Beesley, poems by Ian McMillan. ISBN 978-0957134270.
- Life. London: Bluecoat, 2023. A retrospective.

=== Zines ===
- Esholt Sewage works Bradford 1977–78. Southport: Café Royal, 2016.
- Through the Mill. Southport: Café Royal, 2016.
- The Drift. Southport: Café Royal, 2016.
- Tetleys Brewery Leeds. Southport: Café Royal, 2017.

== Solo exhibitions ==
- A touring exhibition across Finland, organised by the National Museum of Labour History, 2003
- Life, Salts Mill, Saltaire, Bradford, 2022. A retrospective.

== Collections ==
- Science Museum Group, London: 131 prints (as of 17 March 2023)
- Smithsonian Institution, Washington, USA: 5 prints (as of 17 March 2023)

== Awards ==
- 2012: Honorary Fellowship of the Royal Photographic Society, Bath
