= Muhammad Ibrahim Jatoi =

Pakistani politician

- محمد ابراہیم جتوئی

Member of the National Assembly of Pakistan
- In office 1 June 2013 – 2014
- Constituency: NA-202 (Shikarpur)

Personal details
- Party: PMLN (2026-present)
- Other political affiliations: JUI (F) (2024-2026); NPP (2002-2014)

Muhammad Ibrahim Jatoi (Urdu: محمد ابراہیم جتوئی) is a Pakistani politician who had been a member of the National Assembly of Pakistan from June 2013 to 2014.

== Political career ==
He ran for the seat of the National Assembly of Pakistan as a candidate of National Alliance from Constituency NA-202 (Shikarpur-I) in the 2002 Pakistani general election but was unsuccessful. He received 53,235 votes and lost the seat to Aftab Shaban Mirani. In the same election, he was elected to the Provincial Assembly of Sindh as a candidate of National Alliance from Constituency PS-12 (Shikarpur-IV). He received 36,595 votes and defeated Junaid Ahmed Soomro, a candidate of Pakistan Peoples Party (PPP). In January 2013, he vacated the Sindh Assembly seat.

He ran for the seat of the National Assembly as a candidate of National Peoples Party (NPP) from Constituency NA-202 (Shikarpur) in the 2008 Pakistani general election but was unsuccessful. He received 39,405 votes and lost the seat to Aftab Shaban Mirani. In the same election, he ran for the seat of the Provincial Assembly of Sindh as an independent candidate from Constituency PS-12 (Shikarpur-IV) but was unsuccessful. He received 335 votes and lost the seat to Abid Hussain Jatoi.

He was elected to the National Assembly as a candidate of NPP from Constituency NA-202 (Shikarpur) in the 2013 Pakistani general election. He received 54,633 votes and defeated Aftab Shaban Mirani.

In 2014, he was unseated as he became ineligible to continue in office as constituency election was invalidated by voting irregularities.
