= Tangwani =

City in Sindh province, Pakistan

- Country: Pakistan
- Province: Sindh

Population (2023 Census)
  - Total: 12,015

Tangwani, Sindh

Tangwani (Urdu: تنگوانى), is a small town and a tehsil in the Kashmor District of Sindh.

The headquarters is Kandhkot. Tangwani, Ghouspur, Bakhshapur and Badani are also the parts of Kandhkot City Pakistan. It is located at 28°17'0N 69°0'0E with an altitude of 69 metres (229 feet). According to the 2017 census, Tangwani taluka resided 289,259 people. Zip code of Tangwani is 79150.

Tangwani become the Taluka in 2005 with the bifurcation of Kashmore District from Jacobabad. Tangwani Tehsil has following union councils :

U.C. No.	U.C. Name
1	Jaffar Abad
2	Cheel
3	Lashari
4	Bijarani
4	Suhliani
6	Manjhi
7	Gulwali
8	Saifal
9	Saido Kot
10	Karam Pur
11	Sher Garh
12	Dunyapur
13	Naseer
14	Bahalkani

== History ==
According to Arsalah Khan Bajkani aka Ardo Utradi, a notable Sindhi writer and historian the name Tangwani came into being with a mistake by British surveyors in the back 1900s. The land where the present Tangwani is located belonged to Mr. Thangaee Khan Bakhrani. British came here for the land survey and they wrote the survey name Tangwani instead of Thangaee Bakhrani in their Land record.
