= Nishat Afza =

Pakistani politician

Provincial Assembly of the Punjab
- In office 2002–2007
- Constituency: Reserved seat for women

Personal details
- Born: 25 August 1940
- Died: 2016 (aged 75–76)
- Party: Pakistan Peoples Party
- Children: Fariha Razzaq Haroon
- Education: University of the Punjab; Government College Lahore

Nishat Afza (1940-2016) was a Pakistani politician who had been a Member of the Provincial Assembly of the Punjab from 2002 to 2007.

== Early life and education ==
She was born on 25 August 1940.

She graduated from University of the Punjab, where she received a degree of Bachelor of Arts. She obtained a degree of Master of Arts from Government College Lahore.

== Political career ==
She was elected to the Provincial Assembly of the Punjab as a candidate for Pakistan Peoples Party on a reserved seat for women in the 2002 Pakistani general election.
