= Hazar Khan Bijarani =

Pakistani politician

Provincial Assembly of Sindh
- In office 31 May 2013 – 1 February 2018
- Constituency: PS-16 (Jacobabad-IV)
- In office March 1974 – July 1977
- Constituency: PS-16 (Jacobabad-cum-Kashmore)

Member of the National Assembly of Pakistan
- In office March 2008 – March 2013
- Constituency: NA-157 (Jacobabad)
- In office February 1997 – October 1999
- Constituency: NA-157 (Jacobabad)
- In office November 1990 – July 1993
- Constituency: NA-157 (Jacobabad)

Personal details
- Born: 10 July 1946 Karampur, India (now Karampur, Pakistan)
- Died: 1 February 2018 (aged 71) Karachi, Pakistan
- Party: Pakistan Peoples Party
- Spouse: Fariha Razak (m. 2008)
- Children: Mir Shabbir Ali

Mir Hazar Khan Bijarani (Urdu: میرہزار خان بجارانی, 10 July 1946 – 1 February 2018) was a Pakistani politician who was the Member of the Provincial Assembly of Sindh for Constituency PS-16 (Jacobabad-IV) from his election in June 2013 and the Provincial Minister of Sindh for Planning and Development since August 2016 until his death in February 2018. Mir Hazar Khan Bijarani was the chief of 36 tribes. Mir Hazar Khan Bijarani was the son of Sardar Noor Muhammad Khan Bijarani.

A member of Pakistan Peoples Party, Bijarani previously had been a Member of the Provincial Assembly of Sindh from 1974 to 1977 and a member of the provincial Sindh cabinet, in various positions. He was elected to the Senate of Pakistan in 1988 and became a member of the National Assembly of Pakistan where he remained from 1990 to 1993 and again from 1997 to 2013. Between 1988 and 2013, he served in the federal cabinet, in various positions.

== Early life and education ==
Born on 10 July 1946 in what is now Karampur, Kashmore District, Sindh, he received his high school education from the St. Patrick's High School, Karachi.

Bijarani earned a Bachelor of Arts from Government National College and a Master of Arts in Political Science. He was a lawyer and had a Bachelor of Laws from Sindh Muslim Law College.

== Career ==
Bijarani began his political career during his student life as a supporter of Pakistan Peoples Party (PPP).

After the death of his father Sardar Noor Muhamamd Bijarani who was Member of the Provincial Assembly of Sindh, Bijarani was elected to the Sindh Assembly as a candidate of the PPP from Constituency PS-16 (Jacobabad) in a by-election held in early 1974 at the age of 28 and served as the provincial minister of Sindh for Sports during 1974. Reportedly Bijrani was interested in the joining the civil service then politicians however Zulfikar Ali Bhutto convinced him to remain in the politics.

Bijarani was re-elected to the Provincial Assembly of Sindh as a candidate of the PPP from Constituency PS-16 (Jacobabad) in the general election of 1977. and became provincial Minister of Sindh. He remained Member of the Sindh Assembly until Zia-ul-Haq declared martial law in the country in July 1977. He actively participated in the Movement for the Restoration of Democracy and remained in jail for several months.

Bijarani was appointed by Benazir Bhutto as acting president of the PPP chapter in Sindh where he remained from 1986 to 1988. After quitting the PPP in 1988, he was elected to the Senate of Pakistan in the same year. In June 1988, he was inducted into the federal caretaker cabinet and was made Federal Minister for Health, Special Education, Social Welfare, Housing and Works where he served until December 1988.

In August 1990, Bijarani was inducted into the federal caretaker cabinet of caretaker Prime Minister Ghulam Mustafa Jatoi and was appointed Federal Minister for Science and Technology. In October 1990, he was given the additional portfolio of Religious Affairs. He remained at both positions until November 1990.

Bijarani was elected to the National Assembly of Pakistan for the first time as an independent candidate from NA-157 (Jacobabad) in the general election of 1990, obtaining 81,610 votes and defeating a candidate of Pakistan Democratic Alliance. He was inducted into the federal cabinet of Prime Minister Nawaz Sharif and was made Federal Minister for Railways in November 1990 where he served until September 1991. From September 1991 to April 1993, he served as Federal Minister for Defence Production.

Bijarani ran for the seat of the National Assembly as an independent candidate from NA-157 (Jacobabad-II) in the general election of 1993 but was unsuccessful with only 29,684 votes, losing the seat to a candidate of the PPP.

Bijarani was re-elected to the National Assembly from NA-157 (Jacobabad-II) as a candidate of the Pakistan Peoples Party (Shaheed Bhutto) in the general election of 1997, received 41,325 votes and defeated a candidate of the PPP. He remained Federal Minister for Defence Production. He rejoined the PPP in 2001 and was re-elected to the National Assembly from NA-209 (Jacobabad) in the general election of 2002. with 52,613 votes and defeated a candidate of Pakistan Muslim League (Q).

Bijarani was re-elected to the National Assembly from Constituency NA-209 (Jacobabad) as a candidate of the PPP in the general election of 2008. with 111,578 votes. In November 2008, he was inducted into the federal cabinet of Prime Minister Yousuf Raza Gilani and was made Federal Minister for Education. In December 2009, his ministerial portfolio was changed to Industries and Production. In a cabinet reshuffle in February 2011, he retained ministerial portfolio of Industries and Production where he served until May 2011, after which he remained a member of the federal cabinet without portfolio. In October 2011, he was made Federal Minister for Inter-Provincial Coordination. On 19 June 2012, after Prime Minister Yousuf Raza Gilani was disqualified and ousted by the Supreme Court of Pakistan from holding the prime minister office, the federal cabinet was dissolved and Bijarani ceased to be a member of the cabinet.

On 22 June 2012, after Raja Pervaiz Ashraf was elected as next Prime Minister of Pakistan, Bijrani was inducted into the federal cabinet held his previous position as Federal Minister for Inter-Provincial Coordination. He continued to serve at this position until the federal cabinet stood dissolved in March 2013 upon the completion of National Assembly's 5 years term.

Bijarani was re-elected to the Provincial Assembly of Sindh as a candidate of the PPP from PS-16 (Jacobabad-cum-Kashmore) in the general election of 2013 with 25,150 votes. He emerged as a strong candidate for the office of chief minister of Sindh, however PPP choose to elect Syed Qaim Ali Shah as the chief minister. On 31 May 2013 was inducted into the Sindh's provincial cabinet of Chief Minister Syed Qaim Ali Shah and was made provincial minister of Sindh for works and services. In a cabinet reshuffle in July 2015, his ministerial portfolio was changed to Education, but he refused to take charge of the ministry and resigned from the provincial Sindh cabinet in January 2016. On 30 July 2016, Syed Murad Ali Shah succeeded Syed Qaim Ali Shah as the next Chief Minister of Sindh. In August 2016, he was reinducted into the Sindh's provincial cabinet of Chief Minister Syed Murad Ali Shah and was appointed Provincial Minister of Sindh for Planning and Development. He was said to a powerful member of the Sindh's provincial cabinet.

Bijrani authored two books "Point of View" and "An advocate of democracy".

== Death ==
Bijarani was found dead in his home in Karachi on 1 February 2018 along with his second wife Fariha Razzaq Haroon. Bijarani family and the PPP have confirmed that the couple had suffered gunshot wounds. Police suggested that Bijarani killed Fariha before committing suicide. During the investigation, domestic servants of the Bijrani revealed that there had been a scuffle ongoing between the couple over the past few days.

== Personal life ==
In 2008, Bijarani married his second wife Fariha Razzaq Haroon, with whom he had no children.
