= Kashmore Tehsil =

Kashmore
- Tehsil
- Country: Pakistan
- Province: Sindh
- District: Kashmore District

Area
  - Tehsil: 1,262 km^{2} (487 sq mi)

Population (2023)
  - Tehsil: 487,601
  - Density: 386.4/km^{2} (1,001/sq mi)
  - Urban: 97,086 (19.91%)
  - Rural: 390,515 (80.09%)

Literacy (2023)
  - Literacy rate: 32.65%
- Time zone: UTC+5 (PST)

Kashmore Tehsil is an administrative subdivision (tehsil) of Kashmore District in the Sindh province of Pakistan. The city of Kashmore is the capital.

== Demographics ==
=== Population ===
Historical population
Year	Pop.	±% p.a.
1951	52,639	—
1961	70,123	+2.91%
1972	113,553	+4.48%
1981	167,430	+4.41%
1998	268,899	+2.83%
2017	434,966	+2.56%
2023	487,601	+1.92%

As of the 2023 census, Kashmore Tehsil had a population of 487,601.

== See also ==
- Divisions of Pakistan
  - Divisions of Sindh
- Tehsils of Pakistan
  - Tehsils of Sindh, Pakistan
- Districts of Pakistan
  - Districts of Sindh, Pakistan
