= Kandhkot =

Kandhkot: كندھ كوٹ; ڪنڌڪوٽ
- City
- Location within Sindh Location within Pakistan
- Coordinates: 28°14′42″N 69°10′49″E
- Country: Pakistan
- Province: Sindh

Government
  - Type: Municipal Committee
  - Chairman: Ghulam Rashid
  - Voice Chairman: Sher Muhammad
- Elevation: 76 m (249 ft)

Population (2023 Census)
  - Total: 99,155
- Time zone: UTC+5 (PST)
- Postal code: 79160
- Dialling code: 0722

Kandhkot (Sindhi: ڪنڌڪوٽ; Urdu: كندھ كوٹ) is a city in Kashmore District in the Sindh province of Pakistan. It is the 98th largest city of Pakistan with a population of 100,698 according to the 2017 census.

In the last quarter of 2022, Kandhkot along with other many cities in Sindh, was struck by major flooding. Many people died in the city due to heavy rainfall resulting in urban flooding.

The Sindh government, under the Public Private Partnership initiative, planned to construct a bridge on the River Indus to provide better connectivity between Khairpur, Nathanshah, and Kandiaro. The Chief Minister, Syed Murad Ali Shah, presided over the meeting where the decision was made. The construction of the Ghotki-Kandhkot bridge on the Indus River is expected to be completed by July 2023. Additionally, a link road to the M-9 motorway will also be constructed. Kandhkot Tehsil comprises the following union councils:

U.C. No.	U.C. Name
1	Mulgulzar
2	Rasaldar
3	Jagirabad
4	Dolat Pur
5	Wakro
6	Akhero
7	Malheer
8	Haibat
9	Dadar
10	Mangi

== History ==
The current city of Kandhkot is about 200 years old. Kalhora Dynasty established the fort here within their ending days. After Kalhora's, this area remained under the territory of Talpur's known as Mir till 1841, Khangarh now Jacobabad, handed over to East India through Treaty. Kandhkot was a small village during that time with a population of about 100 souls.

As per Ardo Urtradi, the famous sindhi writer and historian, the name "Kandhkot" is often thought to mean "the city on the bank of a river." However, this interpretation is a fabrication. While it's true that many forts were constructed along the banks of the mighty Indus River, none of these forts bear the name "Kandhkot." Instead, the real story behind the city's name and its historical significance lies elsewhere, shrouded in the rich tapestry of its past.

== Demographics ==
=== Population ===
Historical population
Year	Pop.	±% p.a.
1961	12,253	—
1972	21,946	+5.44%
1981	31,948	+4.26%
1998	67,566	+4.50%
2017	100,850	+2.13%
2023	99,155	−0.28%

As of the 2023 census, Kandhkot had a population of 99,155.

Languages

Languages of Kandhkot MC (2023 Census)
1. Sindhi (98.6%)
2. Balochi (0.80%)
3. Others (0.60%)

According to the 2023 census, Sindhi is the main language spoken in Kandhkot Municipal Committee, accounting for 98.6% of the population. Balochi is spoken by 0.8% of the population, while other languages account for the remaining 0.6%.

== Gas and oil field ==
Kandhkot gas field was discovered in 1959. Kandhkot gas field’s reserves are concentrated in the Habib Rahi Limestone, Sui Main and Upper Limestone reservoirs. Although Kandhkot gas field was discovered shortly after Sui gas field, production did not begin until 1987 due to low gas demand.

The CEO of Engro Powergen Qadirpur announced that Pakistan could have saved up to $2 billion annually by utilizing the Kandhkot gas field to supply fuel to its Qadirpur power plant. The Kandhkot gas field, located in Sindh province, was one of the largest gas fields in the country, and its utilization could have helped reduce the country's reliance on imported gas. The Qadirpur power plant, which was previously fueled by imported liquefied natural gas, had a generation capacity of 217 MW and played a crucial role in the country's energy mix.

== See also ==
- Thul
- Kashmore
- Bakhshapur
- Ghouspur
