= Kashmore District =

Kashmore District: ضلو ڪشمور; ضلع کشمور
- District of Sindh
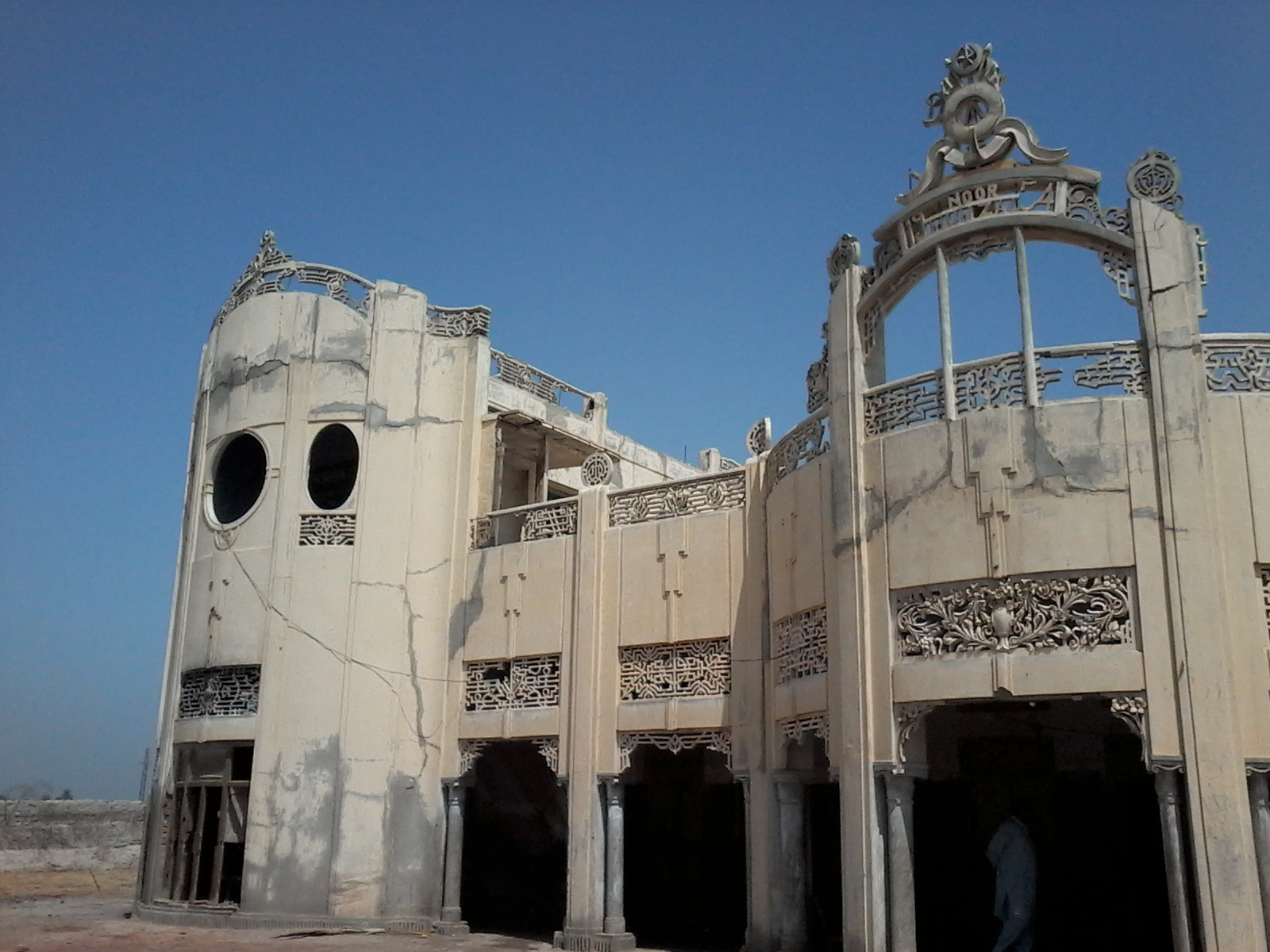
- Haveli near Tangwani

- Coordinates: 28°21′N 69°23′E
- Country: Pakistan
- Province: Sindh
- Division: Larkana
- Established: 2005
- Headquarters: Kandhkot

Government
  - Type: District Administration
  - Deputy Commissioner: Agha Sher Zaman Patha
  - District Police Officer: N/A
  - District Health Officer: Dr Aijaz Ali Shah

Area
  - District of Sindh: 2,580 km^{2} (1,000 sq mi)

Population (2023)
  - District of Sindh: 1,233,957
  - Density: 478/km^{2} (1,240/sq mi)
  - Urban: 271,782 (22.03%)
  - Rural: 962,175

Literacy
  - Literacy rate: Total: 35.59%; Male: 45.08%; Female: 25.72%
- Time zone: UTC+5 (PST)
- Number of Tehsils: 3

Kashmore District (Sindhi: ضلو ڪشمور, Urdu: ضلع کشمور), previously known as Khizmer or Khizmore, is a district of the province of Sindh, Pakistan. The capital city is Kandhkot. The district has a population of 1,090,336. Kashmore District is a part of Larkana Division. Its old name was Khizmer or Khizmor. The spoken languages are Sindhi and Balochi. Its border is connected with Punjab and Balochistan provinces. Kashmore city is gateway to Punjab province and Balochistan province. In 2004, Kashmore became a district after its separation from Jacobabad District.

== Administrative divisions ==
Kashmor District is subdivided into three tehsils:

Tehsil	Area (km^{2})	Pop. (2023)	Density (ppl/km^{2}) (2023)	Literacy rate (2023)	Union Councils
Kandhkot Tehsil	654	407,592	623.23	37.91%	10
Kashmore Tehsil	1,262	487,601	386.37	32.65%	17
Tangwani Tehsil	664	338,764	510.19	36.95%	14

The tehsils are further subdivided into union councils:

U.C. No.	U.C. Name	Taluka
1	Line Purani	Kashmore
2	Khoski	Kashmore
3	Masowalo	Kashmore
4	Domiwali	Kashmore
5	Geehal Pur Village Haji Khan Shar Saleem JAn Mazari Kashmore	Kashmore
6	Gullan Pur	Kashmore
7	Sodhi	Kashmore
8	Noor Pur Pako	Kashmore
9	Chachar	Kashmore
10	Badani	Kashmore
11	Gublo	Kashmore
12	Mahar	Kashmore
13	Toj	Kashmore
14	Kumb	Kashmore
15	Samao	Kashmore
16	Kumbiri	Kashmore
17	Zorgrah	Kashmore
18	Mulgulzar	Kandhkot
19	Rasaldar	Kandhkot
20	Jagirabad	Kandhkot
21	Dolat Pur	Kandhkot
22	Wakro	Kandhkot
23	Akhero	Kandhkot
24	Malheer	Kandhkot
25	Haibat	Kandhkot
26	Dadar	Kandhkot
27	Mangi	Kandhkot
28	Jaffar Abad	Tangwani
29	Cheel	Tangwani
30	Lashari	Tangwani
31	Bijarani	Tangwani
32	Suhliani	Tangwani
33	Manjhi	Tangwani
34	Gulwali	Tangwani
35	Saifal	Tangwani
36	Saido Kot	Tangwani
37	Karam Pur	Tangwani
38	Sher Garh	Tangwani
39	Dunyapur	Tangwani
40	Naseer	Tangwani
41	Bahalkani	Tangwani

== Agriculture ==
Kashmor District has a large cattle market.

== Geography ==
Kashmor District is located in the northern part of Sindh, bordering Ghotki, Jacobabad, Shikarpur and Sukkur within Sindh. It also borders Balochistan on one side and Punjab on the other. The Indus River runs through the Eastern side of Kashmor district. The southeastern side of Kashmor District has forest of "Kacha" that support wild animals. The Thar Desert falls on the Eastern side of the district, and is home to wild desert animals.

== Demography ==
=== Population ===
Historical population
Year	Pop.	±% p.a.
1951	...	—
1961	...	—
1972	...	—
1981	...	—
1998	677,120	—
2017	1,090,336	+2.54%
2023	1,233,957	+2.08%

As of the 2023 census, Kashmore district has 208,894 households and a population of 1,233,957. The district has a sex ratio of 103.73 males to 100 females and a literacy rate of 35.59%: 45.08% for males and 25.72% for females. 485,925 (39.38% of the surveyed population) are under 10 years of age. 271,782 (22.03%) live in urban areas.

=== Religion ===
Religions in Kashmore district (2023)
Religion	Percent
Islam	96.5%
Hinduism	3.21%
Other or not stated	0.29%

The majority religion is Islam, with 96.5% of the population. Hinduism (including those from Scheduled Castes) is practiced by 3.21% of the population who mostly live in urban areas.

Religion in contemporary Kashmore district
Religious group	1941		2017		2023	
Religious group	Pop.	%	Pop.	%	Pop.	%
Islam	114,389	92.81%	1,054,657	96.73%	1,190,767	96.5%
Hinduism	8,825	7.16%	35,122	3.22%	39,667	3.21%
Others (Note: Including Jainism, Christianity, Buddhism, Zoroastrianism, Judaism, Ad-Dharmis, or not stated)	32	0.03%	557	0.05%	3,523	0.29%
Total Population	123,246	100%	1,090,336	100%	1,233,957	100%
Note: 1941 census data is for Kashmore and Kandhkot taluks of Upper Sindh Frontier District, which roughly corresponds to contemporary Kashmore District.

=== Languages ===
At the time of the 2023 census, Kashmore district is predominantly Sindh with more than 90% of the population speaking Sindhi as their mothertongue.

== Kashmore City ==
Kandhkot is the district headquarters of Kashmore, and also an old city that lies on the right side of the Indus River. Kashmore City is a gateway to Punjab and Balochistan. In addition, the city's main electricity comes from the Indus River.

== List of Dehs ==
The following is a list of Kashmore District's dehs, organised by taluka:

- Kashmore Taluka (57 dehs)
  - Badani Kacho
  - Badani Pako
  - Bai Rup
  - Belo
  - Bhanar
  - Bindp Murad
  - Buxapur
  - Chachar
  - Daro Jhando
  - Domewali
  - Elsi
  - Gandheer
  - Geehalpur
  - Gishkori
  - Gondak Kosh
  - Gublo
  - Gullanpur
  - Haji Khan
  - Jakhrani
  - Jalal Sudh
  - Kacho Bahadurpur
  - Kacho Kashmore
  - Kacho Khoski
  - Karimabad
  - Kath Garh
  - Kauro Mahar
  - Keejhar
  - Khahi Kacho
  - Khahi Pako
  - Khewali
  - Kubhar
  - Kumb
  - Kumbhri
  - Line Purani
  - Machhi
  - Mahar
  - Masoowalo
  - Mekhan Bello
  - Mithri
  - Muhammadadani
  - Noorpur Kacho
  - Noorpur Pako
  - Pako Bahadurpur
  - Pako Kashmore
  - Pako Khoski
  - Rio Kacho
  - Sain
  - Samo
  - Shah Ali Pur
  - Shah Garh Kacho
  - Shah Garh Pako
  - Silachi
  - Sodhi
  - Sorah
  - Thalho
  - Toj
  - Zor Garh
- Kandhkot Taluka (49 dehs)
  - Aalamabad
  - Akhero
  - Arain
  - Babarwari
  - Balochabad
  - Bilhari
  - Buxpur
  - Chaman
  - Dadar
  - Dari
  - Dhabhani
  - Dhandhi
  - Dhao
  - Lahri Domki
  - Doulatpur
  - Fareed abad
  - Garhi
  - Ghoraghar Katcho
  - Ghoraghat Pako
  - Ghouspur
  - Gulabpur
  - Haibat Katcho
  - Haibat Pako
  - Jaffarabad Katcho
  - Jageerabad
  - Jangin
  - Kajli
  - Kandhkot
  - Keti
  - Khairwah
  - Khan wah
  - Khanbhri
  - Kundharo Katcho
  - Machko
  - Makan maro
  - Makhwani
  - Malguzar
  - Malheer
  - Malookan
  - Mangi
  - Mari
  - Metahar
  - Rasaldar
  - Rejmatabad
  - Shah Mohammad Jeelani
  - Sunhiyanipur
  - Teghani
  - Wahidpur
  - Wakro
- Tangwani Taluka (42 dehs)
  - Allah abad
  - Bahalkani
  - Bargh
  - Beghoo
  - Bijarani
  - Cheel
  - Dabli
  - Duniyapur
  - Gazi
  - Ghano Khoso
  - Gudo
  - Gulwali
  - Hajano
  - Hazaro
  - Heeranpur
  - Jaffarabad
  - Jamal
  - Jhalo
  - Karampur
  - Kair
  - Khairo
  - Kot dothi
  - Lalao
  - Lashari
  - Manjhi
  - Mari Jafar
  - Nar
  - Naseer
  - Ninde ji Dhori
  - Qureshi
  - Saido kot
  - Saifal
  - Salghni
  - Sanheri
  - Sawan Gabol
  - Shah gazi
  - Sher garh
  - Sherhan
  - Sorwah
  - Suhliyani
  - Tangwani
  - Unar

== See also ==
- Divisions of Pakistan
  - Divisions of Balochistan
  - Divisions of Khyber Pakhtunkhwa
  - Divisions of Punjab
  - Divisions of Sindh
  - Divisions of Azad Kashmir
  - Divisions of Gilgit-Baltistan
- Tehsils of Pakistan
  - Tehsils of Punjab, Pakistan
  - Tehsils of Khyber Pakhtunkhwa, Pakistan
  - Tehsils of Balochistan, Pakistan
  - Tehsils of Sindh, Pakistan
  - Tehsils of Azad Kashmir
  - Tehsils of Gilgit-Baltistan
- Districts of Pakistan
  - Districts of Khyber Pakhtunkhwa, Pakistan
  - Districts of Punjab, Pakistan
  - Districts of Balochistan, Pakistan
  - Districts of Sindh, Pakistan
  - Districts of Azad Kashmir
  - Districts of Gilgit-Baltistan

== Bibliography ==
- 1998 District census report of Jacobabad. Census publication. Vol. 17. Islamabad: Population Census Organization, Statistics Division, Government of Pakistan. 1999.
