= NA-190 Jacobabad =

Constituency of the National Assembly of Pakistan

- Constituency for the National Assembly of Pakistan
- Region: Jacobabad Tehsil, Garhi Khairo Tehsil and Thul Tehsil (partly) of Jacobabad District
- Electorate: 497,578

Current constituency
- Party: Pakistan People's Party
- Member: Aijaz Hussain Jakhrani
- Created from: NA-208 Jacobabad-I

NA-190 Jacobabad (این اے-190، جیکب آباد) is a constituency for the National Assembly of Pakistan.

== Assembly Segments ==
Constituency number	Constituency	District	Current MPA	Party
1	PS-1 Jacobabad-I	Jacobabad District	Sher Muhammad Khan Mugheri	PPP
2	PS-2 Jacobabad-II	Jacobabad District	Sohrab Khan Sarki	PPP
3	PS-3 Jacobabad-III	Jacobabad District	Mumtaz Hussain Khan	PPP

== Members of Parliament ==
=== 2018–2023: NA-196 Jacobabad ===
Election	Member	Party
2018	Muhammad Mian Soomro	PTI

=== 2024–present: NA-190 Jacobabad ===
Election	Member	Party
2024	Aijaz Hussain Jakhrani	PPP

== Election 2002 ==
General elections were held on 10 October 2002. Aijaz Hussain Jakhrani of PPP won by 40,147 votes.

General election 2002: NA-208 Jacobabad-I
Party	Candidate	Votes	%	±%
PPP	Mir Aijaz Hussain Jakhrani	40,147	56.77	
PML(Q)	Illahi Bux Soomro	25,639	36.25	
Others	Others (six candidates)	4,936	6.98	
Turnout		73,728	29.16	
Total valid votes		70,722	95.92	
Rejected ballots		3,006	4.08	
Majority		14,508	20.52	
Registered electors		252,842		

== Election 2008 ==
General elections were held on 18 February 2008. Aijaz Hussain Jakhrani of PPP won by 52,813 votes.

General election 2008: NA-208 Jacobabad-I
Party	Candidate	Votes	%	±%
PPP	Mir Aijaz Hussain Jakhrani	52,813	71.33	
PML(Q)	Fahad Malik	16,482	22.26	
PML(N)	Illahi Bux Soomro	3,879	5.24	
Others	Others (nine candidates)	866	1.17	
Turnout		76,792	28.28	
Total valid votes		74,040	96.45	
Rejected ballots		2,752	3.55	
Majority		36,331	49.07	
Registered electors		271,568		
PPP hold				

== Election 2013 ==
General elections were held on 11 May 2013. Aijaz Hussain Jakhrani of PPP won by 51,025 votes and became the member of National Assembly.

General election 2013: NA-208 Jacobabad-I
Party	Candidate	Votes	%	±%
PPP	Mir Aijaz Hussain Jakhrani	51,025	45.91	
PML(N)	Illahi Bux Soomro	45,801	41.21	
PTI	Ali Haider Zaidi	7,589	6.83	
Others	Others (fourteen candidates)	6,716	6.05	
Turnout		117,620	45.65	
Total valid votes		111,131	94.48	
Rejected ballots		6,489	5.52	
Majority		5,224	4.70	
Registered electors		257,664		
PPP hold				

== Election 2018 ==
General elections were held on 25 July 2018.

General election 2018: NA-196 Jacobabad
Party	Candidate	Votes	%	±%
PTI	Muhammad Mian Soomro	92,274	45.44	
PPP	Aijaz Hussain Jakhrani	86,876	42.78	
Others	Other (nine candidates)	23,916	11.78	
Turnout		216,726	44.59	
Total valid votes		203,066	93.70	
Rejected ballots		13,660	6.30	
Majority		5,398	2.66	
Registered electors		486,064		
PTI gain from PPP				

== Election 2024 ==
General elections were held on 8 February 2024. Aijaz Hussain Jakhrani won the election with 126,411 votes.

General election 2024: NA-190 Jacobabad
Party	Candidate	Votes	%	±%
PPP	Aijaz Hussain Jakhrani	126,411	63.44	▲20.66
Independent	Muhammad Mian Soomro	61,555	30.89	N/A
Others	Others (twelve candidates)	11,289	5.67	
Turnout		212,211	42.65	▼1.94
Total valid votes		199,255	93.89	
Rejected ballots		12,956	6.11	
Majority		64,856	32.41	
Registered electors		497,578		
PPP gain from Independent				

== See also ==
- NA-189 Rajanpur-III
- NA-191 Jacobabad-cum-Kashmore
