= Muhammad Muqeem Khan Khosa =

Pakistani politician and the Chief Sardar of Khoso tribe

- محمد مقیم خان کھوسہ

Member of Provincial Assembly of Sindh
- In office 2013–2016
- Preceded by: Abdul Raheem Khan Khosa
- Succeeded by: Aurangzaib Panhwar
- Constituency: PS-14 (Jacobabad-II)

Member of National Assembly
- In office 1988–1990
- Succeeded by: Ilahi Bux Soomro
- Constituency: NA-156 Jacobabad-1

Personal details
- Born: 12 October 1949 Jacobabad, Sindh, Pakistan
- Died: 17 April 2016 (aged 66) Aga Khan University Hospital, Karachi, Pakistan
- Children: 6

Sardar Muhammad Muqeem Khan Khosa (12 October 1949 – 17 April 2016; Urdu: سردار محمد مقیم خان کھوسہ) was a Pakistani politician and the Chief Sardar of Khosa tribe. He was elected as a Member of National Assembly of Pakistan from his hometown constituency of NA-156 Jacobabad-I in 1988. He was also the Sindh provincial minister for fisheries in the 2007 caretaker government. At the time of his death on 17 April 2016, he was a Member of the Provincial Assembly of Sindh from PS-14 (Jacobabad-II) on the ticket of Pakistan Peoples Party.

== Political career ==
He started his political career by joining Jamaat-e-Islami. He contested the party-less 1985 Pakistani general election and was elected a Member of Sindh Assembly. After joining Pakistan Peoples Party, he contested the 1988 general election from the NA-156 Jacobabad-I constituency, and defeated heavyweights such as former Chief Minister of Balochistan Mir Taj Muhammad Jamali and the former Speaker of National Assembly Ilahi Bux Soomro.

During the 1990 general elections, Khosa was declared ineligible after a recount on the application of Soomro, who himself was declared the winner. Khosa was then made a district president of the PPP.

During the 2001 local bodies elections during the Musharraf regime, he was not awarded tickets to contest elections for the district nazim and naib zila nazim posts. Therefore, he left PPP and contested as an independent candidate. He was defeated by Shabbir Bijarani.

Khosa then created his own party and named it Samaji Inqilabi Mahaz. Later, it was absorbed into Pakistan Muslim League (Q).

Khosa became the provincial minister for fisheries in the caretaker set-up of Sindh cabinet under Muhammad Mian Soomro. He later made a public announcement to rejoin PPP during a public meeting held in Jacobabad on 21 December 2007.

In the 2013 Pakistani general election, he was elected as MPA of PPP from PS-14 (Jacobabad-II) after a recount in which he was deemed to have received 15,838 votes. He was a member of the assembly’s standing committees on culture, tourism and antiquities, forest, wildlife, environment, and irrigation at the time of his death.

== Death ==
On 17 April 2016, Khosa died of liver disease at the Aga Khan University Hospital in Karachi. The Sindh Assembly session, which was to take place the next day, was adjourned for 24 hours to mourn his death. Before the adjournment, Minister for Parliamentary Affairs Nisar Khuhro recalled his political and social services for the people of Jacobabad.

He was survived by four daughters, two sons, and three wives. His funeral was held at Qadirpur, his native village which is located in the suburbs of Jacobabad, and was attended by former Prime Minister Zafarullah Khan Jamali as well as several MNAs and MPAs from the Pakistan Peoples Party. He was laid to rest in his family graveyard.
