= Shahal Khan Khosa =

Pakistani politician

Mausoleum of Khan Sahib Shahal Khan in Bachro

Shahal Bahadur Khan Khosa (1909–1956) was a Pakistani politician from the Khosa Baloch family from Thul, Jacobabad, Sindh, an influential family among the region's landed nobility. He was a Member of the Provincial Assembly of Sindh and represented his constituency Thul (West) from 1953 to 1956.

His grandfather Dil Murad Khan revolted against British in 1857 and was sent to the Andaman Islands.
