= Soomro (disambiguation) =

Soomro (or Soomra, Sumrah) is a Sindhi tribe mainly based in Sindh, parts of Punjab bordering Sindh and in Balochistan, Pakistan.

Soomro may also refer to:

- Soomra dynasty, rulers in the Sindh region of present-day Pakistan from 1025 to 1351
- Tando Soomro, a village and union council of Tando Allahyar District, Sindh province, Pakistan

== People with the surname ==
- Abdul Karim Soomro, Pakistani politician, Member of the Provincial Assembly of Sindh
- Abdul Wahid Soomro, Pakistani politician, Member of the National Assembly of Pakistan
- Adal Soomro (born 1955), Sindhi language poet and academic
- Ahmed Mian Soomro, Pakistani politician
- Allah Bux Soomro (1900–1943), a zamindar, government contractor, Indian independence activist and politician from the province of Sindh in British India
- Ayaz Soomro (1958–2018), Pakistani politician and lawyer, member of the National Assembly of Pakistan
- Dodo Bin Khafef Soomro III, ruler of Sindh
- Zainab Tari, ruled as queen of Sindh from 1092 AD until 1102 AD.
- Elahi Bux Soomro (1926–2024), Pakistani politician and legislator
- Fozia Soomro (1966–2002), Sindhi folk singer
- Kainat Soomro (born 1993), Pakistani woman activist whose struggle to obtain justice for her gang rape at the age of 13 drew international attention
- Khalid Mehmood Soomro (1959–2014), a religious leader of Pakistan
- Muhammad Mian Soomro (born 1950), Pakistani politician and a banker
- Naseer Soomro (1969 or 1970–2025), Pakistani airline employee, tallest man in Pakistan
- Rahim Bux Soomro (1913–2005), a politician in Sindh, Pakistan

== See also ==
- Soomra (disambiguation)
