= Dil Murad Khan =

Dil Murad Khan was a Baloch warrior who opposed British invasion in his area by revolting against them in 1857. Being a sardar of the Khosa tribe, he had the support of his tribesmen plus that of other sardars of the area, namely Sardar Darya Khan Jakhrani and Syed Inayat Ali Shah.

On the evening before they were to fight with British troops someone leaked information about the whereabouts of the warriors and their plan. Who leaked this information to British is not known. All the three sardars were arrested taken to some unknown area and then Dil Murad Khan was sentenced to life imprisonment, in the Andaman Islands while his companions were sent to Aden.

After his arrest his brother Shahal Khan I was imprisoned at Mach jail and was made to crush glasses that affected his eyesight and became blind and later on released as a blind person.

When all this happened Dil Murad Khan and Darya Khan Jakhrani had a vast area of agricultural land under their possession. All the land was confiscated and the Sardar title was taken back. Bahadur Khan Mir Bahadur Khan Rind, the only son of Dil Murad Khan was a small boy and his mother Seza, a Jamali woman by tribe, took her son to General John Jacob's Durbar and bravely spoke to him saying, "I am just a woman with a blind brother in law. I cannot support this boy so I request you to kindly arrest my son and send him to his father". John Jacob was quite moved by these bold remarks of a tribal woman and ordered a piece of land to be given to the family near Dilmurad Wah in Thul Taluka.

Mir Bahadur Khan Khoso pursued a different life style and he proved himself to be an inventive genius who advised engineers on various irrigation projects. Bahadur Khan had more than forty thousand acres of land in Jacobabad District all purchased by himself.
