= Bachro =

Bachro Khan sahib Shahal Khan Khoso
- Village
- Location within Sindh
- Coordinates: 28.2667°N 68.7333°E
- Country: Pakistan
- Province: Sindh
- District: Jacobabad District

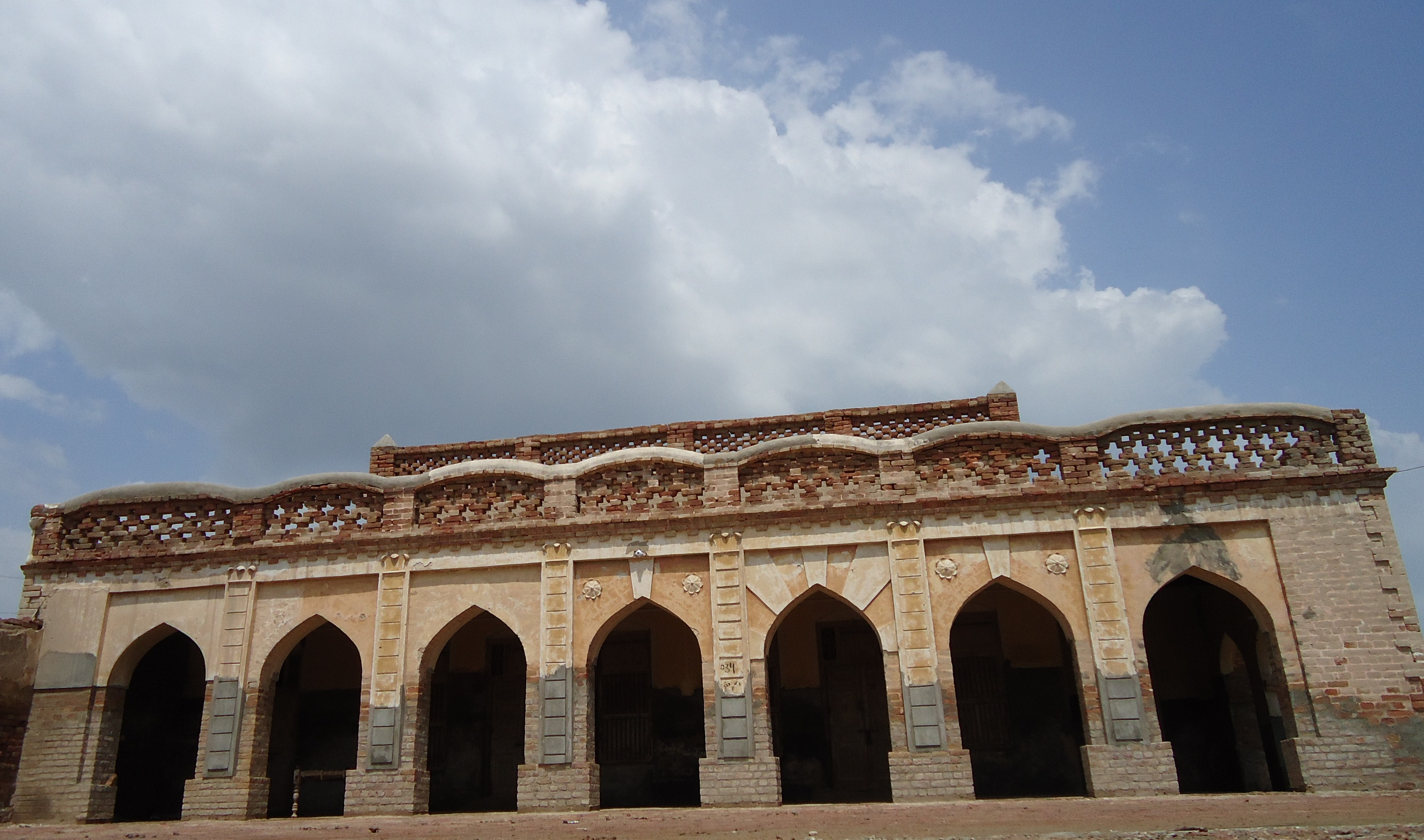
Khan Sahib Shahal Khan Khoso's Bangalow

Bachro is a village and Union Council division of the Taluka of the town of Thul. It is located in the Jacobabad District of Sindh, Pakistan. It is also known as village Khan Sahib Shahal Khan Khoso, named in honor of Khan Sahib Shahal Khan, whose mausoleum is located there.

Bachro is 9 kilometres (5.6 mi) away from Thul and 35 kilometres (21.7 mi) away from the city of Jacobabad. Ninety five percent of the population of the village is connected with agriculture. Paddy, Wheat, Barley and Gram are the main crops.

The village has a primary school, a middle school and a high school (under construction) to cater for their educational needs. For patients, there is a basic health unit, where a medical practitioner provides basic treatment and immunisation.

The Bachro UC region had a population of 17,735 in 1998 and estimated population of 25,006 in 2005. It has an area of 26,541 acres.

Historically, there stands a 1908-built Red Brick Castle of Bahadur Khan Khoso and, nearby, the 1936-built bungalow of Khan Sahib Shahal Khan Khoso.
