= Aijaz Hussain Jakhrani =

Pakistani politician hailing from Jacobabad, Sindh

- اعجاز حسین جکھرانی

Member of the National Assembly of Pakistan
- Incumbent
- Assumed office 29 February 2024
- Constituency: NA-190 Jacobabad
- In office 2002 – 31 May 2018
- Constituency: NA-208 (Jacobabad)

Personal details
- Born: March 5, 1967 (age 59) Jacobabad, Sindh, Pakistan
- Party: PPP (2002-present)

Aijaz Hussain Jakhrani (Urdu: اعجاز حسین جکھرانی; born 5 March 1967) is a Pakistani politician who has been a member of the National Assembly of Pakistan since February 2024 and previously served in this position from 2002 to May 2018. He is associated with the Pakistan Peoples Party (PPP) from the Constituency of Jacobabad of the 14th Assembly.

From 2018 to 2023, he was the advisor to Chief Minister Sindh.

== Early life and education ==
He was born on 5 March 1967. He earned a bachelor's degree from University of Sindh in 1984.

== Political career ==
He was elected to the National Assembly of Pakistan as a candidate of Pakistan Peoples Party (PPP) from Constituency NA-208 (Jacobabad-I) in the 2002 Pakistani general election.

In 2008 he stood again in NA-208 as a PPP candidate and once again he won.

In November 2008, he was inducted into the federal cabinet of Prime Minister Yusuf Raza Gillani and was appointed as Federal Minister for Health where he served until December 2009. In December 2009, he was made Federal Minister for Sports where he continued to serve until February 2011.

He was elected to the National Assembly as a candidate of PPP from Constituency NA-208 (Jacobabad) in the 2013 Pakistani general election.

He contested the 2018 Pakistani general election from NA-196 Jacobabad as a candidate of PPP, but was unsuccessful. He received 86,876 votes and was defeated by Muhammad Mian Soomro, a candidate of Pakistan Tehreek-e-Insaf (PTI).

He was re-elected to the National Assembly from NA-190 Jacobabad as a candidate of PPP in the 2024 Pakistani general election. He received 126,411 votes and defeated Muhammad Mian Soomro, an Independent politician candidate.

== Controversy ==
National Accountability Bureau (NAB) a close aide of Jakhrani's in Islamabad on allegation of owning assets more than his means.
