= Aurangzaib Panhwar =

Pakistani politician

Member of the Provincial Assembly of Sindh
- In office September 2016 – 28 May 2018
- Preceded by: Muhammad Muqeem Khan Khoso
- Constituency: PS-14 (Jacobabad-II)

Personal details
- Born: 4 June 1980 (age 45) Jacobabad
- Party: Pakistan Peoples Party

Aurangzaib Panhwar is a Pakistani politician who had been a Member of the Provincial Assembly of Sindh, from September 2016 to May 2018.

== Early life and education ==
He was born on 4 June 1980 in Jacobabad.

He has a degree in Master of Arts from Shah Abdul Latif University in Khairpur.

== Political career ==
He was elected to the Provincial Assembly of Sindh as a candidate of Pakistan Peoples Party from Constituency PS-14 JACOBABAD-II in by-polls held in August 2016.
