= Chaudhry Amir Hussain =

Pakistani politician

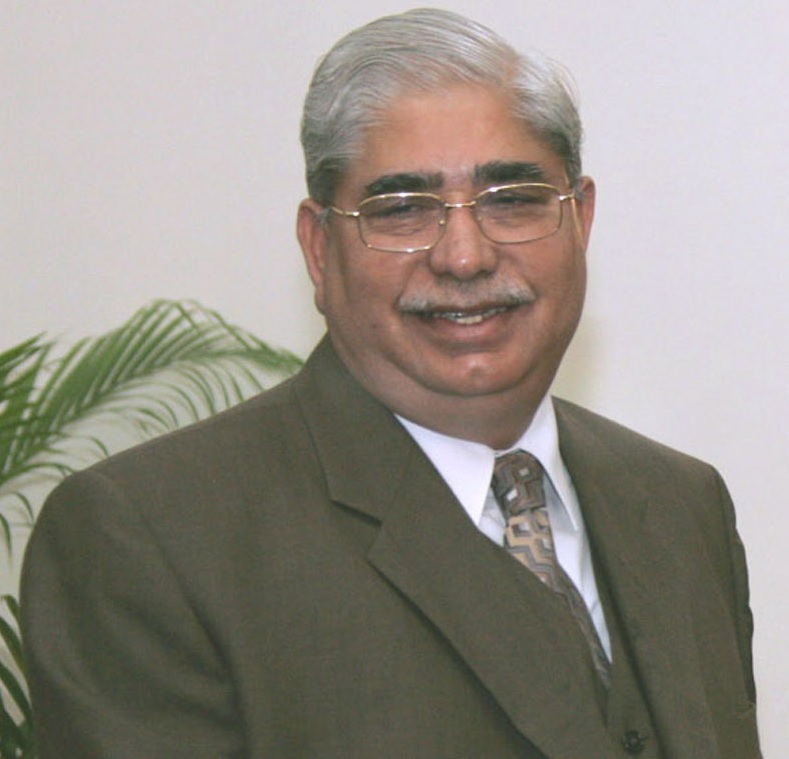

Acting President of Pakistan
- In office 9 March 2007 – 9 September 2007
- Prime Minister: Shaukat Aziz; Mian Soomro (Caretaker)
- Preceded by: Pervez Musharraf
- Succeeded by: Pervez Musharraf

15th Speaker of the National Assembly of Pakistan
- In office 19 September 2002 – 19 March 2008
- Deputy: Sardar Muhammad Yaqoob Khan
- Preceded by: Elahi Bux Soomro
- Succeeded by: Fahmida Mirza

Personal details
- Born: 22 June 1942 (age 84) Jammu, Jammu and Kashmir (princely state) (now Jammu and Kashmir, India)
- Party: Pakistan Muslim League (Before 1985); Pakistan Muslim League- Functional (1985–1988); Pakistan Muslim League- Nawaz (1988–2002); Pakistan Muslim League- Quaid (2002–present)
- Education: University of the Punjab

Chaudhry Amir Hussain (born 22 June 1942; Jammu and Kashmir) is a Pakistani politician. He was the 17th Speaker of the National Assembly of Pakistan, serving from 2002 to 2008.

Chaudhry Amir Hussain was born in Jammu. His family migrated to Sialkot in 1947. He got his M.A 'LLB from the University of the Punjab & enrolled as an advocate. He is now an advocate of the Supreme Court of Pakistan. He started his parliamentary politics in 1985 when he was elected as a Member of the National Assembly of Pakistan. He represented his constituency for five terms. He remained Federal Minister for Law, Justice and Parliamentary affairs. He also served as a Speaker of the National Assembly of Pakistan from 2002 to 2008.

On October 2, 2007, 85 Pakistani opposition lawmakers resigned from the country's parliament to derail President Pervez Musharraf's re-election bid. The Parliament was to elect the new president before October 15. National Assembly Speaker Chaudhry Amir Hussain stated that the resignations would not affect the presidential election.

Hussain was defeated in the February 2008 parliamentary election.

== Acting President of Pakistan ==
Chaudhry Amir Hussain was the acting President of Pakistan from 2007–2007, when President Pervez Musharraf went abroad for medical treatment.

Political offices
Preceded by Elahi Bux Soomro	Speaker of the National Assembly; 2002–2008	Succeeded by Fahmida Mirza
