= Jacobabad–Gwadar Line =

Proposed railway line in Pakistan

Overview
- Status: Proposed
- Locale: Pakistan
- Termini: Jacobabad; Gwadar

Service
- Type: High-speed rail

Technical
- Line length: 1,087 km (675 mi)

The Jacobabad–Gwadar Line is an upcoming railway project aiming to establish a connection between the Pakistani cities of Jacobabad and Gwadar. Stretching across a length of 1087 kilometers, the estimated cost of this project amounts to US$2.3 billion. Anvwar Asian Investments (AAI) from Oman is at the forefront of leading this initiative, offering a substantial investment of US$2.3 billion, with an initial contribution of US$500 million.

== Background ==
The Jacobabad–Gwadar Line is part of the China-Pakistan Economic Corridor (CPEC) program, which aims to provide a rail connection between Gwadar and Xinjiang province in China. The proposed line will be the high-speed rail connection between Gwadar and Jacobabad. Moreover, it will hold the distinction of being the first railway project under the CPEC program.
