= PS-1 Jacobabad-I =

Constituency of the Provincial Assembly of Sindh, Pakistan

- Constituency for the Provincial Assembly of Sindh
- Region: Jacobabad Tehsil (partly) including Jacobabad city and Thul Tehsil (partly) of Jacobabad District
- Electorate: 214,229

Current constituency
- Member: Vacant
- Created from: PS-14 Jacobabad-II

PS-1 Jacobabad-I (پی ایس-1، جیکب آباد-1) is a constituency of the Provincial Assembly of Sindh.

== General elections 2024 ==
Provincial election 2024: PS-1 Jacobabad-I
Party	Candidate	Votes	%	±%
PPP	Sher Muhammad Mugheri	48,242	63.44	
Independent	Abdul Razzaque Khan	18,130	23.84	
Independent	Mir Raja Khan Jakhrani (Note: Filed nomination papers as PTI candidate but ECP allowed him to run as an independent)	4,734	6.23	
TLP	Jan Muhammad	1,363	1.79	
JI	Deedar Ali Lashari	1,232	1.62	
Others	Others (twenty one candidates)	2,348	3.08	
Turnout		79,657	37.18	
Total valid votes		76,049	95.47	
Rejected ballots		3,608	4.53	
Majority		30,112	39.60	
Registered electors		214,229		

== General elections 2018 ==
Contesting candidates	Party affiliation	Votes polled

== General elections 2013 ==
Contesting candidates	Party affiliation	Votes polled

== General elections 2008 ==
Contesting candidates	Party affiliation	Votes polled

== See also ==
- PS-130 Karachi Central-IX
- PS-2 Jacobabad-II
