= Thul Nao (Jacobabad) railway station =

Railway station in Pakistan

Thul Nao railway station

General information
- Owner: Ministry of Railways

Other information
- Station code: THLS

History
- Former names: Great Indian Peninsula Railway
Location

Thul Nao railway station (Urdu: تھل ناؤ ریلوے اسٹیشن) is a railway station located in Jacobabad District, Pakistan. Founded in 1950s, it is one of the two railway stations that serve the area.

== See also ==
- List of railway stations in Pakistan
- Thul-Nao railway station
