= Upper Sind Frontier District =

Coordinates: 28°15′N 68°50′E

Upper Sind Frontier District was a district of the Bombay Presidency during British Rule in colonial India. The district was the northernmost portion of Sind and lay between 27°56' and 28° 27' N. and 68° and 69° 44' E, with an area of 2,621 square miles (6,790 km^{2}). It was bounded on the north and west by the Dera Ghazi Khan District of the Punjab and by Baluchistan; on the south by Sukkur District; and on the east by the river Indus.

It was the northern most area of the Sindh province with the Frontier Crimes Regulations as the law of the land. The Frontier Crimes Regulations were repealed in the year 1952 where-after it was named as Jacobabad district. Nasirabad sub-division of Sibi agency was added to the Jacobabad district on 1 May 1961, which as present no more in the district.

== Terrain ==
The district was described by the Imperial Gazetteer of India as follows:

The District consists of a narrow strip of level plain covered in parts with dense jungle, which, prior to the construction of the Kashmor embankment in 1879-80, was exposed to annual inundations. The embankment now keeps out the physical aspects. flood-water, and cultivation is general. The greatest length from east to west is 114 miles (183 km), and the maximum breadth from north to south 20 miles (32 km). The land itself lies from 170 to 273 feet (83 m) above sea-level, being highest on its eastern side near the river Indus, whence it slopes downwards to the west. The south-east extremity of the District consists of high mountains, part of the Kirthar range, the highest peak being Miangun (5,100 ft). These hills and the adjacent flood-swept plain are sparsely inhabited. The northern border of the District is skirted by the Bugti hills, part of the Sulaiman Mountains. Geologically, the District consists of alluvial deposits and desert.

== Climate ==
The climate is remarkable for its intense heat, the greatest in colonial India, its variations in temperature, and the smallness of the rainfall. The hot season extends from April to October. For the remainder of the year the weather is cold and agreeable. In November and March the temperature rises considerably in the daytime, but in the winter nights cold is severe and frost. is frequent. Cool nights are experienced in April and May, after which the full force of the heat is felt, the nights being oppressive and the humidity generally over 70 per cent.

During the five years 1900-4, the maximum temperature recorded was 126 °F (52 °C), the minimum on the same day being 88 °F (31 °C). Shade temperatures over 120 °F (49 °C) are frequently recorded, and sometimes the thermometer does not fall below 90 °F (32 °C) for several successive days. After August the nights become cooler, the north-west wind sets in, and by the middle of October the temperature falls considerably. The annual rainfall averages about 3 inches.

== Demography ==
The District contained one town, Jacobabad and 390 villages, according to the 1872 census it has a population of 115,050, in 1881 145,180, in 1891 174,548 - according to the 1901 census the population was 232,045 (89 persons per square mile). The increase was due to immigration from Baluchistan and the Punjab, to fresh lands having been brought under cultivation, and to changes in the area of the District amounting to an addition of about 500 square miles (1,300 km^{2}). According to the 1901 census, the chief language was Sindhi, which was spoken by 165,110 persons, or 71% of the total majority of the district. Siraiki and Balochi were also spoken in all parts of the District. Muslims formed 90 per cent of the total population and Hindus 9 per cent.

== Administration ==
The district, headquartered at the city of Jacobabad, was subdivided into 6 talukas:

- Jacobabad Taluka
- Thul
- Kandhkot
- Kashmor
- Shahdadkot
- Nasirabad
