= Thul Tehsil =

Thul Taluka تعلقہ ٹھل ٺل تعلقو
- Taluka (Tehsil)
- Country: Pakistan
- Province: Sindh
- District: Jacobabad District

Area
  - Taluka (Tehsil): 1,301 km^{2} (502 sq mi)

Population (2023)
  - Taluka (Tehsil): 533,153
  - Density: 409.8/km^{2} (1,061/sq mi)
  - Urban: 122,595 (22.99%)
  - Rural: 410,558 (77.01%)

Literacy (2023)
  - Literacy rate: 38.53%
- Time zone: UTC+5 (PST)
- Number of towns: 3
- Number of Union Councils: 24

Thul Tehsil (Sindhi: ٺل) is an administrative Tehsil of Jacobabad District in the Sindh province of Pakistan. The subdivision is administratively subdivided into 24 Union Councils, two of which form the capital, Thul. Thul is one of the densely populated Taluka of District Jacobabad, spreading over 317,520 acres. It consists of about half of the population of whole district and its population is approximately 356,705. There are 19 union councils and 96 Dehs in this taluka. The headquarters of this taluka are about 33 km at the east side of district headquarters and connected with rail and road with other parts such as Kandhkot, Shikarpur and Baluchistan province.

== Demographics ==
=== Population ===
Historical population
Year	Pop.	±% p.a.
1951	74,979	—
1961	91,796	+2.04%
1972	192,754	+6.98%
1981	302,835	+5.15%
1998	356,705	+0.97%
2017	465,412	+1.41%
2023	533,153	+2.29%

As of the 2023 census, Thul Tehsil has population of 533,153.

=== Religion ===
- Islam
- Hinduism, Sindhi Hindus mainly concentrated in the urban areas.
- Others.

=== Languages ===
Sindhi, Balochi and others. Sindhi and Balochi are commonly spoken for communication in the area, since it is near Balochistan, it has therefore a notable number of Baloch people living in the town due to which Balochi has become the mostly spoken language after Sindhi.

== Transport ==
Thul is located at corner of three districts of Sindh, Jacobabad, Shikarpur and Kashmore. Round about one hour journey to each district headquarters of the cities.

Rail: Thul Railway Station is located outside of the Thul city approximately three km. It connects the city of Thul to Jacobabad and Kandhkot.

By road: Thul is connected via road to most major Pakistani cities such as Karachi connecting link road to National Highway at Hamayun area, Panjab, Islamabad, Peshawar, Gilgit-Baltistan, AJK and others via connecting Indus Highway at Kandhkot and Quetta connecting through National Highway at Jacobabad.

== Important crops ==
More than 85% of population of Thul is connected with agriculture or allied professions. Paddy, wheat and barley are the important crops of Thul. Thul has a notable rice market.

=== Geographical location of Taluka Thul is as under ===
Lat: 28.2333, Lat (DMS): 28° 13' 60N,

Long: 68.7667, Long (DMS): 68° 46' 0E

Altitude (feet): 196, Altitude (meters): 59.

== See also ==
- Garhi Khairo Tehsil
- Thul
- Jacobabad District
