= Soomra =

Soomra may refer to:

- Soomra, Estonia, village in Audru Parish, Pärnu County, in southwestern Estonia
- Soomra (tribe) or Soomro, a Sindhi clan in Sindh, parts of Punjab, and Balochistan
- Soomra dynasty, a dynasty established by the Soomra clan in 1024-1351

== See also ==
- Soomro (disambiguation)
