= Saira Shahliani =

Pakistani politician

Member of the Provincial Assembly of Sindh
- In office June 2013 – 28 May 2018
- Constituency: Reserved seat for women
- In office August 2012 – March 2013
- Constituency: Reserved seat for women
- In office 2002–2007
- Constituency: Reserved seat for women

Personal details
- Born: 6 July 1976 (age 49) Jacobabad
- Party: Pakistan Peoples Party

Saira Shahliani is a Pakistani politician who had been a Member of the Provincial Assembly of Sindh, from June 2013 to May 2018. Previously she had been a Member of the Provincial Assembly of Sindh from 2002 to 2007 and again from 2012 to 2013.

== Early life and education ==
She was born on 6 July 1976 in Jacobabad.

She has earned the degree of Bachelor of Arts from the Government Degree College, Quetta and completed a Master of Arts in English from the University of Balochistan.

== Political career ==
She was elected to the Provincial Assembly of Sindh as a candidate of Pakistan Peoples Party (PPP) on a reserved seat for women in 2002 Pakistani general election.

She was re-elected to the Provincial Assembly of Sindh as a candidate of PPP on a reserved seat for women in August 2012 after Shazia Marri resigned from the seat.

She was re-elected to the Provincial Assembly of Sindh as a candidate of PPP on a reserved seat for women in 2013 Pakistani general election.
