= Thul-Nao railway station =

Railway station in Pakistan

Coordinates: 28.262810°N 68.761261°E

General information
- Owner: Ministry of Railways

Other information
- Station code: THLN

History
- Opened: 1950s
- Former names: Great Indian Peninsula Railway
Location

Thul-Nao railway station (Urdu: تھل نو ریلوے اسٹیشن) is located in Jacobabad District of Sindh, Pakistan. Founded in 1950s, it is one of the two railway stations that serve the area.

== See also ==
- List of railway stations in Pakistan
- Thul Nao (Jacobabad) railway station
