= Jacobabad District =

District in Sindh, Pakistan

Coordinates: 28°16′48″N 68°25′48″E

Jacobabad District ضلع جیکب آباد جيڪب آباد ضلعو
- District of Sindh
- (Previously Upper Sind Frontier District)
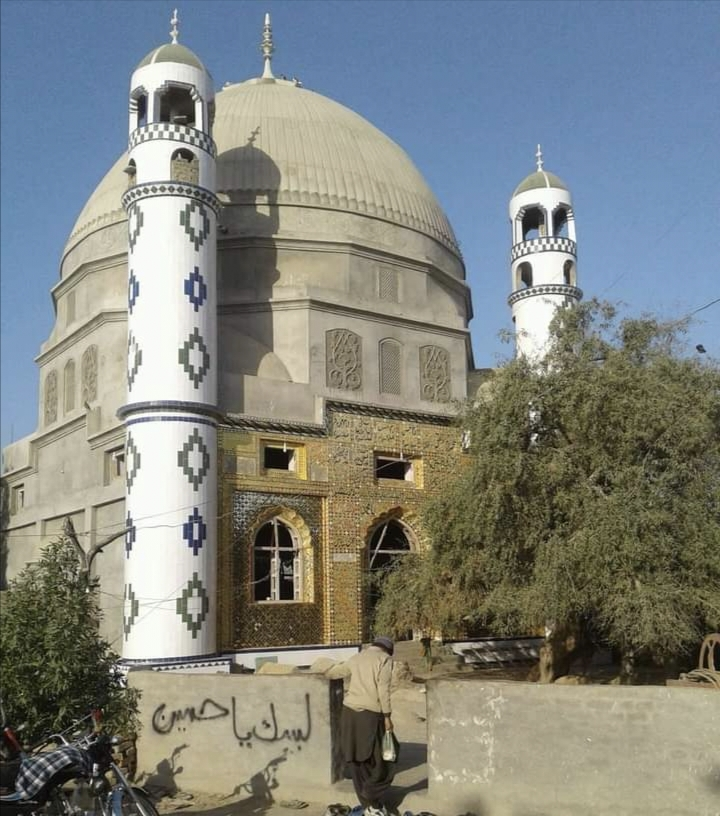
- the Shrine of Lal Shah Bari is a 17th-century Sufi shrine in the Dodapur UC, Garhi Khairo Tehsil
- Interactive map of Jacobabad District
- Country: Pakistan
- Province: Sindh
- Division: Larkana
- Established: 1847
- Founder: British Government
- Headquarters: Jacobabad

Government
  - Type: District Administration
  - Deputy Commissioner: N/A
  - District Police Officer: N/A
  - District Health Officer: N/A

Area
  - District of Sindh: 2,698 km^{2} (1,042 sq mi)

Population (2023)
  - District of Sindh: 1,174,097
  - Density: 435.2/km^{2} (1,127/sq mi)
  - Urban: 361,917 (30.83%)
  - Rural: 812,180

Literacy
  - Literacy rate: Total: 42.34%; Male: 51.77%; Female: 32.65%
- Time zone: UTC+5 (PST)
- Number of Tehsils: 3

Jacobabad District (Sindhi: جيڪب آباد ضلعو, Urdu: ضلع جیکب آباد) is a district of Sindh province of Pakistan. According to 2023 Census population of Jacobabad District is 1,174,097 It is located in the north of Sindh, by the provincial boundary with Balochistan. Its headquarters is the City of Jacobabad, which was founded by General John Jacob in 1847.

== Administration ==
District Council Jacobabad have 44 Union councils, 2 Municipal Committees and 3 Town Committees

The district is administratively subdivided into the following tehsils:

Tehsil	Area (km²)	Pop. (2023)	Density (ppl/km²) (2023)	Literacy rate (2023)
Garhi Khairo Tehsil	733	193,297	97,102	45.58%
Jacobabad Tehsil	664	447,647	226,993	45.47%
Thul Tehsil	1,301	533,153	271,692	38.53%

== History ==
During British India, the town was the administrative headquarters of the Upper Sindh Frontier District of the Bombay Presidency; with a station on the Quetta branch of the North-Western railway, 37 m. from the junction at Ruk, on the main line. It is famous as having consistently the highest temperature in Pakistan. During the month of June the thermometer ranges between 120° and 127 °F. The town was founded on the site of the village of Khangarh in 1847 by General John Jacob, for many years commandant of the Sind Horse, who died here in 1858, and left a marvellous Victoria Tower in his remembrance in the heart of the city. It has cantonments for a cavalry regiment, with accommodation for caravans from Central Asia. It is watered by two canals. An annual horse show is held in January.

The district has had its present name since 1952. For a brief period after 1961, it included the Nasirabad subdivision. In 2004 Kashmore District was formed from its eastern half.

== Demography ==
=== Population ===
Historical population
Year	Pop.	±% p.a.
1951	188,718	—
1961	232,893	+2.13%
1972	402,114	+5.09%
1981	586,234	+4.28%
1998	727,190	+1.28%
2017	1,007,009	+1.73%
2023	1,174,097	+2.59%

As of the 2023 census, Jacobabad district has 195,056 households and a population of 1,174,097. The district has a sex ratio of 103.04 males to 100 females and a literacy rate of 42.34%: 51.77% for males and 32.65% for females. 446,843 (38.06% of the surveyed population) are under 10 years of age. 361,917 (30.83%) live in urban areas.

=== Religion ===
Religions in Jacobabad district (2023)
Religion	Percent
Islam	97.74%
Hinduism	1.89%
Other	0.37%

Islam is the predominant religion with 97.74% of the population while Hinduism is the minority religion, practiced by 1.89% of the population.

Religion in contemporary Jacobabad District
Religious group	1941		2017		2023	
Religious group	Pop.	%	Pop.	%	Pop.	%
Islam	160,674	88.87%	984,423	97.76%	1,147,620	97.74%
Hinduism	19,839	10.98%	21,712	2.16%	22,203	1.89%
Others (Note: Including Jainism, Christianity, Buddhism, Zoroastrianism, Judaism, Ad-Dharmis, or not stated)	275	0.15%	874	0.08%	4,274	0.37%
Total Population	180,788	100%	1,007,009	100%	1,174,097	100%
Note: 1941 census data is for Jacobabad, Garhi Khairo and Thul taluks of Upper Sindh Frontier District, which roughly corresponds to contemporary Jacobabad District.

=== Languages ===
Languages of Jacobabad district (2023)
1. Sindhi (89.7%)
2. Balochi (6.52%)
3. Brahui (2.14%)
4. Others (1.67%)

At the time of the 2023 census, Nearly 90% of the population spoke Sindhi, 6.52% Balochi and 2.14% Brahui as their first language.

== Airport and airbase ==
The commercial airport at Jacobabad, about 300 miles (480 km) north of Karachi and 300 miles (480 km) southeast of Kandahar, is located on the border between Sindh and Balochistan provinces. The Shahbaz Air Base (co-located with the commercial airport in Jacobabad) was one of the three Pakistani air bases used by U.S. and allied forces to support the Operation Enduring Freedom campaign in Afghanistan and drone strikes in the former Federally Administered Tribal Areas.

== List of Dehs ==
The following is a list of Jacobabad District's dehs, organised by taluka:

- Jacobabad Tehsil (58 dehs)
  - Abad
  - Abdullah Dakhan
  - Ahmedpur
  - Akilpur
  - Alipur
  - Attai
  - Bachal Pur
  - Badal Wah
  - Bajhani
  - Baqapur
  - Bello Alipur
  - Bello Dixon
  - Bhalidino
  - Burj Selemi
  - Chajjra
  - Chawani
  - Dadh
  - Dadpur
  - Dasti
  - Detha
  - Dilawarpur
  - Fatehpur
  - Garhi Chand
  - Garhi Mehrab
  - Ghouspur
  - Hambhi
  - Jacobabad
  - Janidero
  - Khairwah
  - Khaloolabad
  - Koureja
  - Lal Lodro
  - Malhooabad
  - Mehar Shah
  - Mehrabpur
  - Milkiat Sarkar
  - Moulabad
  - Moulan Rato
  - Mundranipur
  - Nawara
  - Nawazo
  - Orangabad
  - Phatanwah
  - Pir Padhro
  - Qadirpur
  - Qaiasrabad
  - Rahimabad
  - Ramzanpur
  - Retti
  - Rindwahi
  - Shahdadpur
  - Shahpur
  - Sheeradabad
  - Soomanpur
  - Thariri Bhalidino
  - Umaranipur
  - Wakro
  - Waryamabad
- Thul Taluka (93 dehs)
  - Abdullah Jakhrani
  - Ali Khan
  - Allagh Yar
  - Athri
  - Bachro
  - Bahadurpur
  - Bakhtiarpur
  - Balochabad
  - Bamble
  - Barri
  - Bhanger
  - Bitti
  - Bolaki
  - Burira
  - Chandan
  - Channa
  - Daho
  - Dakhan
  - Daro Mukh
  - Deen Garh
  - Dhani Bux
  - Dil Murad
  - Dool
  - Dubi
  - Fateh Khan Sabayo
  - Ganji
  - Garhi Hassan
  - Garhi Rahimabad
  - Ghulamoon
  - Ghunia
  - Girkano
  - Gola
  - Gujo
  - Hairo
  - Hambi
  - Hotewah
  - Hyderpur
  - Jalal Pur
  - Jariyoon
  - Jhangiwah
  - Joungal
  - Kanrani
  - Karim Abad
  - Karim Bux
  - Katta
  - Khatan
  - Khosa
  - Khuda Bux
  - Korar
  - Kot Gul Muhammad
  - Kot Jangu
  - Lado
  - Logi
  - Loi
  - Madad Khoso
  - Maloi
  - Mehar Ali
  - Mehrabpur
  - Miral Nau
  - Miral Purano
  - Mirpur
  - Mirsipur
  - Mitho Thariri
  - Moosa Wah
  - Mubarakpur
  - Muhib Wah
  - Nagan
  - Nau Wah
  - Odhano
  - Pako
  - Panah Abaad
  - Phul
  - Purano Wah
  - Qalendarpur
  - Rahim Abad
  - Ranjhapur
  - Rap Muard
  - Rato Thariri
  - Sajin Wah
  - Sameja
  - Sarki
  - Sher Wah
  - Shujra
  - Tajo Khoso
  - Talib Shah
  - Tanwari
  - Thariri
  - Thul Nau
  - Thul Purano
  - Toj
  - Udi
  - Wah Mistri
  - Zangipur
- Garhi Khairo Taluka (60 dehs)
  - Abdullah Mahesar
  - Allah Pur
  - Allahabad
  - Amir Abad
  - Azmat Abad
  - Baharo Khokhar
  - Budho
  - Daro Jeeand
  - Datirdino Mahesar
  - Dital Wah
  - Doda Pur
  - Drib Morayo
  - Dunya Pur`
  - Garhi Khairo
  - Ghouse Abad
  - Gokal Pur
  - Gul Wah
  - Hazar Wah
  - Jafar Abad
  - Jahan Pur
  - Jalbani
  - Jamal Abad
  - Jeeand
  - Khairo
  - Khan Wah
  - Khand
  - Khanpur
  - Khuda Abad
  - Kitch
  - Kohari
  - Koor Beero
  - Koor Khairo Gachal
  - Koor Rato
  - Kotari
  - Kote Ali Nawaz
  - Lal Odho
  - Lal Wah
  - Lund
  - Mairee
  - Miranpur
  - Muarad Ali
  - Muhammad Pur
  - Nao Wah
  - Nazimabad
  - Pir Bux
  - Punhoon Bhatti
  - Qeemat Abad
  - Rasol Abad
  - Saleh
  - Sawan Lashari
  - Shah Bazi Mahar
  - Shaheed
  - Sher Khan
  - Sheran Pur
  - Sone Wah
  - Sultanpur
  - Tajo Dero
  - Thariri
  - Wah Ali Hyder
  - Wasayo

== Notable people ==
- Ahmed Mian Soomro, Pakistani Politician
- Abdul Hafeez Shaikh, Pakistani economist and politician
- Aijaz Hussain Jakhrani, Pakistani Politician
- Elahi Bux Soomro, Pakistani Senior Politician
- Kiran Baluch, Pakistani Former Cricketer
- Muhammad Muqeem Khan Khoso, Pakistani Politician
- Saira Shahliani, Pakistani politician

== See also ==
- Garhi Khairo Tehsil
- Jacobabad Tehsil
- Thul Tehsil
- Jacobabad
- Thul
- Larkana Division
- Divisions of Pakistan
  - Divisions of Balochistan
  - Divisions of Khyber Pakhtunkhwa
  - Divisions of Punjab
  - Divisions of Sindh
  - Divisions of Azad Kashmir
  - Divisions of Gilgit-Baltistan
- Tehsils of Pakistan
  - Tehsils of Punjab, Pakistan
  - Tehsils of Khyber Pakhtunkhwa, Pakistan
  - Tehsils of Balochistan, Pakistan
  - Tehsils of Sindh, Pakistan
  - Tehsils of Azad Kashmir
  - Tehsils of Gilgit-Baltistan
- Districts of Pakistan
  - Districts of Khyber Pakhtunkhwa, Pakistan
  - Districts of Punjab, Pakistan
  - Districts of Balochistan, Pakistan
  - Districts of Sindh, Pakistan
  - Districts of Azad Kashmir
  - Districts of Gilgit-Baltistan

== Bibliography ==
- 1998 District census report of Jacobabad. Census publication. Vol. 17. Islamabad: Population Census Organization, Statistics Division, Government of Pakistan. 1999.
