= Sher Muhammad Khan Mugheri =

Member of the Provincial Assembly of Sindh from Jacobabad (2024–2029)

- شیر محمد خان مُغیری

Member of the Provincial Assembly of Sindh
- Incumbent
- Assumed office 25 February 2024
- Constituency: PS-1 Jacobabad-I

Personal details
- Party: PPP (2024-present)

Sher Muhammad Khan Mugheri (Urdu: شیر محمد خان مُغیری) (Sindhi: شير محمد خان مُغيري) is a Pakistani politician who is member of the Provincial Assembly of Sindh.

== Political career ==
Sher Muhammed Mugheri wons the 2024 Sindh provincial election from PS-1 Jacobabad-I as a Pakistan People’s Party candidate. He received 48,385 votes while runner up Independent (PTI) Supported Pakistan Tehreek-e-Insaf, candidate Abdul Razzaq Khan received 18,115 votes.
