= Elahi Bux Soomro =

Pakistani politician (1926–2024)

Honorable Elahi Bux Soomro
- الاهي بخش سومرو

14th Speaker of the National Assembly of Pakistan
- In office 16 February 1997 – 20 August 2001
- Deputy: Chaudhry Muhammad Jaffar Iqbal
- Preceded by: Yousaf Raza Gillani
- Succeeded by: Chaudhry Amir Hussain

Personal details
- Born: 15 May 1926 Jacobabad District, Bombay Presidency, British India (now Pakistan)
- Died: 9 October 2024 (aged 98) Karachi, Sindh, Pakistan
- Party: PMLN (1993–2024); Pakistan Muslim League (1962–1993)
- Education: Columbia University

Elahi Bux Soomro or Illahi Bukhsh Soomro (Sindhi: الاهي بخش سومرو;15 May 1926 – 9 October 2024) was a Pakistani politician and legislator from Shikarpur, Sindh. He was the 16th Speaker of the National Assembly of Pakistan. He belonged to an influential political family of Sindh. He held several federal ministries, including portfolios of Ministry of Industries and Production, Ministry of Housing & Works, Ministry of Defence Production, Ministry of IT, Ministry of Science & Technology, Ministry of Information & Broadcasting, Ministry of Water and Power. He was one of few politicians who have been very close to Presidents and Prime Ministers of the Islamic Republic of Pakistan. He was a close and childhood friend of Zulfiqar Ali Bhutto, favourite of Zia-ul-Haq for the post of Prime Minister, the first minister appointed in the cabinet of and by Ghulam Mustafa Jatoi, Benazir Bhutto used to call him "Uncle", a very close aide to Nawaz Sharif and Ghulam Ishaq Khan, and before the 2002 elections, the top army officials had announced his name for the premiership. He was a strong candidate for Prime Minister at numerous times in the 1980s as well.

== Civil servant ==
Soomro remained Director General of the Karachi Development Authority, Managing Director of S.I.T.E, Rector of the Ghulam Ishaq Khan Institute of Engineering Sciences and Technology, NED University of Engineering and Technology and Jinnah Medical and Dental College, and above all he made a record of becoming four times Chairman of the Pakistan Engineering Council, each for three-year terms. He was the Chancellor of the Institute of Business Management in Karachi.

== Acting President of Pakistan ==
Elahi Bux Soomro was the acting President of Pakistan from 1999–1999 when President Muhammad Rafiq Tarar went abroad for medical treatment.

== Nomination for premiership ==
Before the 2002 elections, the top army officials had announced his name for the premiership but Soomro lost the 2002 election, and claimed the election was not fair.

== Personal life and death ==
Elahi Bux Soomro was born to a Sindhi family of the Soomro tribe on 15 May 1926 in the Jacobabad district.

Soomro died from a cardiac arrest at his home in Karachi, on 9 October 2024, at the age of 98.

== See also ==
- National Assembly of Pakistan
- Politics of Pakistan

Political offices
Preceded by Yousaf Raza Gillani	Speaker of the National Assembly; 1997–2001	Succeeded by Chaudhry Amir Hussain

Political offices
Preceded by Aftab Ahmed Khan	Chancellor of the Institute of Business Management; 2013–?	Succeeded by ?
