= Ahmed Mian Soomro =

Pakistani politician

Ahmed Mian Soomro احمد میاں سومرو
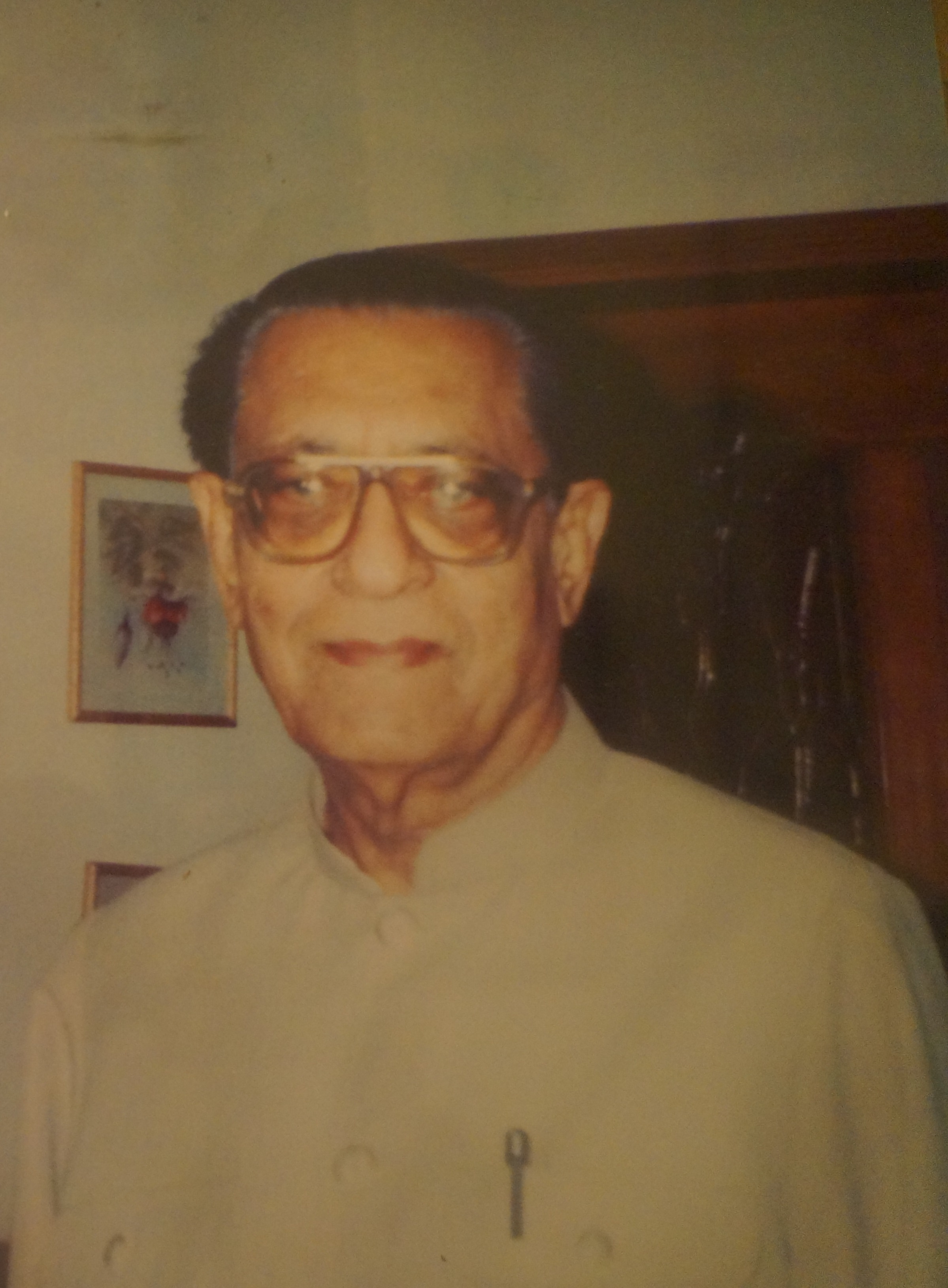

Ahmed Mian Soomro (Sindhi: احمد میاں سومرو) was a Pakistani politician who belonged to a political family from Sindh province that has been active in public life since 1923.

== Career ==
He belonged to District Jaccobabad of Sindh Province. He served as Deputy Speaker and Senior Deputy Speaker of the West Pakistan Assembly (12 June 1965 to 25 March 1969); he was a member of the Senate and helped to establish the Senate Committee Systems. He remained active in local politics at District level.

== Family ==
He has three wife's Begum Razia Soomro, Begum Saeeda Soomro and Begum Sarwat un nisa Soomro and three children named as Mr Mohammed Mian Soomro (son) Mrs Maliha Malik (daughter) and Mrs Sarah Soomro (daughter)

His son, Muhammad Mian Soomro, has held various positions in national and international organisations. He also held various top level political positions and served as Governor of Sindh (2000–2002), Chairman Senate of Pakistan (2003–2007), Caretaker Prime Minister of Pakistan (2007–2008) Acting President of Pakistan (2008), and Chairman Senate of Pakistan (2008–2009).
