= John Jacob (East India Company officer) =

British military officer (1812–1858)

Brigadier-General John Jacob CB
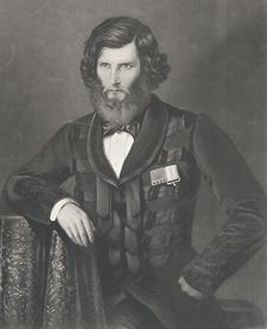
- Brigadier General Jacob, engraving by Thomas Lewis Atkinson, 1859
- Born: 11 January 1812; Woolavington, Somerset, England
- Died: 6 December 1858 (aged 46); Jacobabad, British India (now in Sindh, Pakistan)
- Burial place: Jacobabad, British India (now in Pakistan)
- Military career
- Allegiance: United Kingdom
- Branch: East India Company
- Service years: 1828–1858
- Rank: Brigadier-General
- Commands: 36th Jacob's Horse
- Conflicts: First Anglo-Afghan War; Anglo-Persian War

Brigadier-General John Jacob CB (11 January 1812 – 6 December 1858) was an officer of the British East India Company who served in colonial India for the major portion of his career. He is known for the cavalry regiment called 36th Jacob's Horse, and for founding the town of Jacobabad, in Sind province of British India (now Sindh in modern-day Pakistan), where he planned and supervised the transformation of thousands of acres of desert into arable land over the course of twenty years. The scale of progress and prosperity his works brought to the region can be appreciated by comparing those regions' relative prosperity compared to areas which were not under his administrative jurisdiction.

== Early life ==
He was born at Woolavington, in the county of Somerset, England, where his father the Reverend Stephen Long Jacob was incumbent. His mother was Susanna, daughter of the Reverend James Bond of Ashford, Kent, England. He was schooled by his father until he obtained his cadetship to Addiscombe Military Seminary. A number of the young cadets there who were his contemporaries, included such famous officers as Eldred Pottinger, Robert Cornelis Napier, Henry Marion Durand, Vincent Eyre and others. He was commissioned into the Bombay Artillery (Bombay Army) on his 16th birthday, and subsequently sailed for India in January 1828, never to set foot in England again.

== Afghan War ==
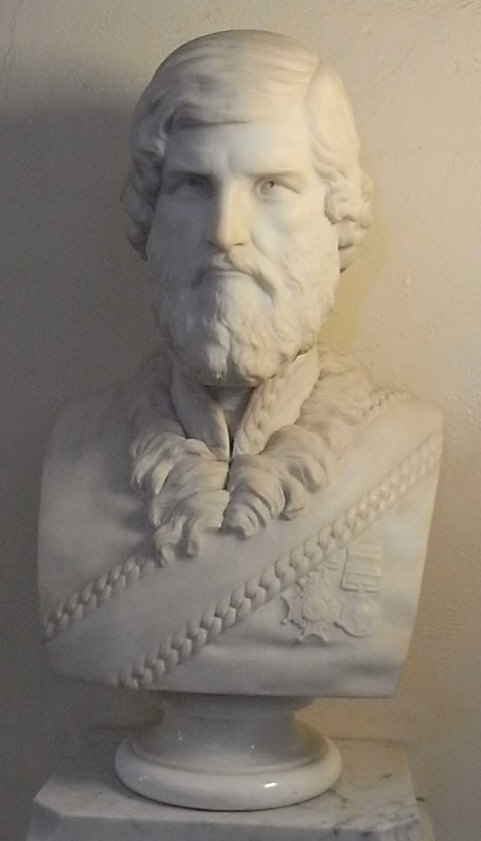
Brigadier General John Jacob, CB. Marble bust at Taunton Shire Hall

After seven years employed with his regiment, he was then employed as subordinate to the collector of Gujarat. In 1838 he was ordered to Sind with the Bombay column, to join the Army of the Indus at the outbreak of the First Anglo-Afghan War.

He first saw active service in the summer of 1839 as a subaltern of artillery, the force led by Sir John Keane, sent to invade the Upper Sindh. He was given command of the Sind Horse by Sir James Outram in 1841; in 1842 he was additionally placed in political charge of the whole of the Cutchee frontier. He saw his first major action as Brevet-captain at the Battle of Meanee, with the British force sent to conquer Sindh. He was made a Companion of the Order of the Bath.

He set about to recruit a second regiment of Sind Horse, which Napier announced in a letter dated 28 November 1846 would be called Jacob's Horse. As Irregular cavalry, each regiment had only three European officers, a system that Jacob argued should be extended to all Indian cavalry regiments. Both regiments were absorbed into the Indian Army in 1860 and ultimately became the 35th Sind Horse and the 36th Jacob's Horse. They saw active service in Northern and Central India, Persia and Afghanistan, and during World War I in France. They were amalgamated in 1921 and became known as the 14th Prince of Wales's Own Scinde Horse.

== Transforming the Village of Khangarh to City of Jacobabad ==
In 1847 Jacob was placed in political charge of the frontier and established his headquarters at Khangurh. At the time he set foot on there, the area was known as Upper Sind 'desert', littered with marauders who looted for living. At the first place he restored peace in the area by thoroughly defeating the predator tribes. Then he started building infrastructure for the town, (at the village of Khangurh and its surroundings). Being an architect and an engineer himself, he designed and then executed the plans of laying a wide road network around the town that measured a good 600 miles (965 km). In that he resolved the problem of unavailability of potable water for the residents by excavating a tank that contained water brought from the Indus through a canal. His biggest and most important feat was the excavation of Begaree Canal, originating from the Guddu barrage on the river Indus, going round the district irrigating thousands of acres of land previously uncultivated, thereby providing means of living to thousands of people.

== As a Military Engineer ==
He wrote many pamphlets which were critical of the Indian Army as it then was, and got him into trouble with the Government in London. He was a scientist and inventor, developing an exploding bullet, or shell, that fired combustibles up to 6 miles (9.7 km). He believed this would revolutionize the art of war. Two good riflemen could, in his opinion, annihilate the best battery of field artillery in 10 minutes. Further experiments made it possible to fire shells up to a range of 14 miles. More importantly, he designed a four grooved rifle and had various experimental guns manufactured in London by leading gunsmiths, and at his expense.

In April 1855 he was gazetted Lieutenant-Colonel. In 1856, due to Sir Bartle Frere's poor health, he taking leave in England, Jacob was pronounced acting Commissioner in Sind.

== Persian War ==
At the outbreak of the Anglo-Persian War, Jacob was put in charge of the cavalry and departed for Persia. He was raised to the rank of Brigadier-General, and appointed Aide-de-Camp to Queen Victoria. When he arrived at Bushire, General Stalker having suddenly died, Jacob was put in charge of 3,000 men. Peace favourable to the British Government having been negotiated, Jacob was left in charge of conducting the evacuation of Bushire.

A month after the end of hostilities with the Persians, the Indian rebellion of 1857 had broken out; Jacob's Horse remained loyal throughout. He was anxious to return to India, as he had been selected for the command of the Central Indian Army. He was delayed in Bushire on the insistence of the British minister there, and Lord Elphinstone was unable to await his arrival; the command was given to Sir Hugh Rose instead. Jacob returned to Jacobabad where he raised two regiments of infantry. The 130th Baluchis and 26th Jacob's Mountain Battery are named after him. He died of ill health at Jacobabad on 6 December 1858. He was buried in the town where his grave has been well-maintained by the locals for whom he retains a cult status, and, according to BBC correspondent Mark Tully locals believed he had saintlike status.

== Legacy ==
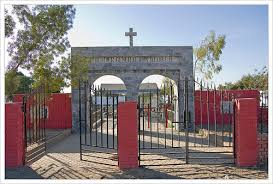
Mausoleum of John Jacob

Jacob involved local people in works for the common good. He subdivided tasks and distributed them among families. Jacob noted that he saw men working into the night without orders. It was local people who took to calling the new settlement "Jekumbad".

Controversy arose over a pamphlet Jacob published, "Letters to a Lady on the Progress of Being", which presented an early version of evolutionary theory. He resisted claims from clergy serving in India that he was attempting to undermine Christian faith. (source The Saturday Review 1858 "General Jacob on the Progress of Being"

Not long after Jacob's death the simple grave turned into a shrine for Muslims and Hindus alike for an oil lamp could be seen burning at its head. This practice, according to Lambrick, was discontinued on the orders of the Executive Engineer in the 1930s for the oil from the lamp left a messy stain on the grave. But still, many of the Baloch villagers visit the tomb, pray for the health of an ailing child or for happiness and wealth.

Among his collateral descendants were Lt. Gen. Sir Ian Jacob, KBE, CB, a former Director-General of the BBC, Prof. E. F. Jacob, an historian; and Gordon Jacob, a composer.
