= Jacobabad Tehsil =

Jacobabad Tehsil تعلقہ جیکب آباد جيڪب آباد تعلقو
- Taluka (Tehsil)
- Interactive map of Jacobabad Tehsil
- Coordinates: 28°16′53″N 68°26′11″E
- Country: Pakistan
- Province: Sindh
- Division: Larkana Division
- District: Jacobabad District

Area
  - Taluka (Tehsil): 664 km^{2} (256 sq mi)

Population (2023)
  - Taluka (Tehsil): 447,647
  - Density: 674/km^{2} (1,750/sq mi)
  - Urban: 219,315 (48.99%)
  - Rural: 228,332 (51.01%)

Literacy (2023)
  - Literacy rate: 45.47%

Jacobabad Tehsil is an administrative subdivision (tehsil) of Jacobabad District, Sindh, Pakistan. It is subdivided into 15 Union Councils, 8 of which comprise the capital Jacobabad

== History ==
During British rule, the taluka was part of the Upper Sind Frontier District of the Bombay Presidency - the Imperial Gazetteer of India describes the taluka as follows:

lying between 27° 56' and 28° 26' N. and 67° 59' and 68° 37' E., with an area of 460 square miles. It contains one town, JACOBĀBĀD (population, 10,787), headquarters of the District and tāluka; and 85 villages. The population in 1901 was 64,972, compared with 48,330 in 1891. This is the most thickly populated tāluka in the District, the density being 141 persons per square mile. The land revenue and cesses in 1903-4 amounted to nearly 350,000. The tāluka is irrigated by the Begāri Canal and its branches, and also to a slight extent by the Desert Canal.

== Demographics ==
=== Population ===
Historical population
| Year | Pop. | ±% p.a. |
|---|---|---|
| 1951 | 67,805 | — |
| 1961 | 90,049 | +2.88% |
| 1972 | 135,482 | +3.78% |
| 1981 | 181,163 | +3.28% |
| 1998 | 267,998 | +2.33% |
| 2017 | 382,578 | +1.89% |
| 2023 | 447,647 | +2.65% |

As of the 2023 census, Jacobabad Tehsil had a population of 447,647.

== See also ==
- Jacobabad Junction railway station
- Jacobabad
- Jacobabad District
