= Thul =

Thul ٹُھل
- City
- Thul
- Location of Thul Thul (Pakistan) Thul (South Asia) Thul (Asia)
- Coordinates: 28°14′25″N 68°46′30″E
- Country: Pakistan
- Province: Sindh
- District: Jacobabad

Government
  - Type: Municipal Committee
  - Chairman: Shahzeb Zulfikar
  - Vice-Chairman: Abdul Rehman
  - MPA: Sohrab Sarki
- Elevation: 59 m (194 ft)

Population (2023)
  - City: 88,554
- Time zone: UTC+5 (PST)
- Postal code: 79100
- Number of Union councils: 24

Thul (Urdu: ٹُھل) is a city of Jacobabad District in the Sindh Province of Pakistan. It is located at 28°14'0N 68°46'0E at an altitude of 59 metres (196 feet). Thul is biggest Tehsil of Sindh; It 10 Police Stations, 3 Town Committees, 1 Civil Hospital and 5 rural Health centers, 3 High Schools, that are working. It has a degree college on Mirpur Burriro road. Thul has the largest rice industry in the city of Sindh.

== Demographics ==
Population

Historical population
Year	Pop.	±%
1972	7,918	—
1981	12,726	+60.7%
1998	29,125	+128.9%
2017	70,245	+141.2%
2023	88,554	+26.1%
Population

According to 2023 census, Thul city had a population of 88,554.

Languages

Languages of Thul MC(2023 Census)
1. Sindhi (98.0%)
2. Balochi (1.20%)
3. Pashto (0.30%)
4. Urdu (0.20%)
5. Others (0.30%)

According to the 2023 Census, Sindhi is spoken by 98% of the population of Thul city, followed by Balochi (1.2%), Pashto (0.3%), Urdu (0.2%), and other languages (0.3%).

== Transport ==
Thul is located at corner of three districts of Sindh, Jacobabad, Shikarpur and Kashmore. Round about one hour journey to each district headquarters of the cities.

Rail: Thul Railway Station is located outside of the Thul city approximately three km. It connects the city of Thul to Jacobabad and Kandhkot.

By road: Thul is connected via road to most major Pakistani cities such as Karachi connecting link road to National Highway at Hamayun area, Panjab, Islamabad, Peshawar, Gilgit-Baltistan, AJK and others via connecting Indus Highway at Kandhkot and Quetta connecting through National Highway at Jacobabad.

== Climate ==
Thul has a hot desert climate with long summers and mild winters. Average summer high temperatures routinely exceed 103°F (39°C) and peak in June around 110°F (43°C), while winter lows in January drop to around 49°F (9°C) with daytime highs near 72°F (22°C).

== See also ==
- Thul Tehsil
- Jacobabad
- Kashmore
