= Muhammad Mian Soomro =

Pakistani politician (born 1950)

- محمد میاں سومرو
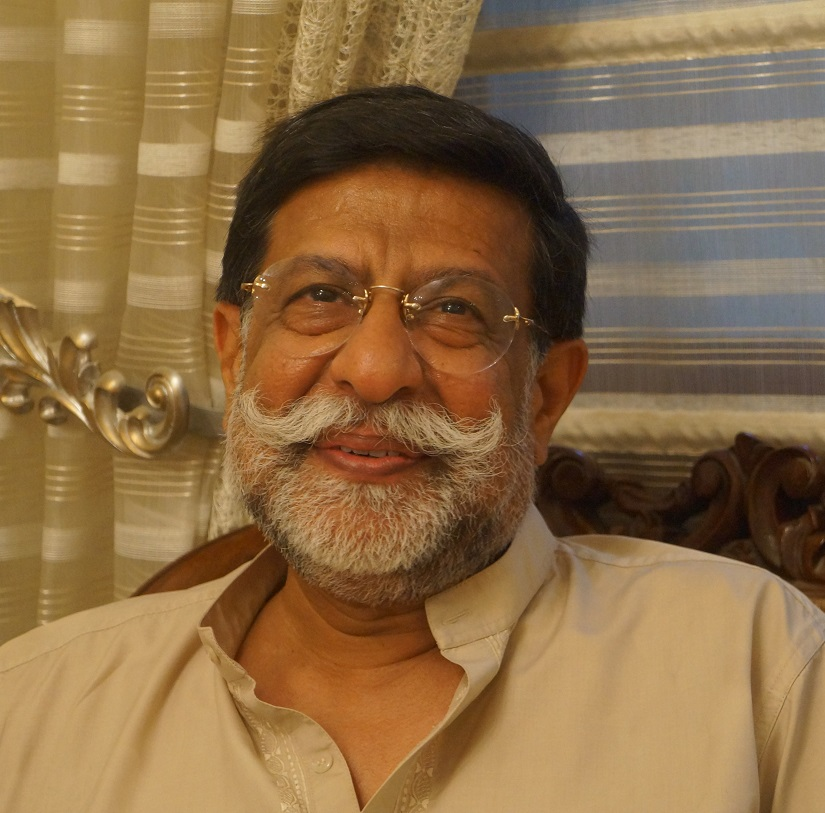
- Soomro in 2016

President of Pakistan
- In office 18 August 2008 – 9 September 2008
- Prime Minister: Yusuf Raza Gillani
- Preceded by: Pervez Musharraf
- Succeeded by: Asif Ali Zardari

Prime Minister of Pakistan
- In office 16 November 2007 – 24 March 2008
- President: Pervez Musharraf
- Preceded by: Shaukat Aziz
- Succeeded by: Yusuf Raza Gillani

Governor of Sindh
- In office 25 May 2000 – 26 December 2002
- Preceded by: Azim Daudpota
- Succeeded by: Ishrat-ul-Ibad Khan

Minister of Privatisation
- In office 5 October 2018 – 10 April 2022
- President: Arif Alvi
- Prime Minister: Imran Khan
- Preceded by: Shamshad Akhtar (caretaker)
- Succeeded by: Abid Hussain Bhayo

Chairman of the Senate
- In office 12 March 2003 – 11 March 2009
- Preceded by: Wasim Sajjad
- Succeeded by: Farooq Naek

Senator of Pakistan
- In office 23 March 2003 – 11 March 2009
- Constituency: Sindh

Member of the National Assembly of Pakistan
- In office 13 August 2018 – 10 April 2022
- Constituency: NA-196 Qambar Shahdadkot-I (Jacobabad)

Personal details
- Born: 19 August 1950 (age 76) Karachi, Sindh, Dominion of Pakistan
- Party: Pakistan Muslim League (Q)
- Parent: Ahmed Mian Soomro (father)
- Education: University of Indus

Muhammad Mian Soomro (Sindhi: محمد ميان سومرو; Urdu: محمد میاں سومرو; born 19 August 1950) is a Pakistani politician, banker and senator who has served as Chairman of the Senate, Caretaker Prime Minister of Pakistan and Acting President of Pakistan. He also served as the 26th Governor of Sindh and as Federal Minister for Privatization.

Born to a native Sindhi family originally linked to the Soomra dynasty, he served as the chairman of the Senate from 2003 to 2009, the Caretaker prime minister of Pakistan from 2007 to 2008, and the acting president of Pakistan from 18 August 2008 to 9 September 2008. Soomro hails from an influential Sindhi feudal family that has been active in national politics since 1923. His father, the late Ahmed Mian Soomro, was Deputy Speaker of the West Pakistan Assembly and a member of the Senate and helped to establish the Senate Committee Systems. He is the grandson of another politician, Khan Bahadur Haji Moula Bux Soomro. He was Caretaker Prime Minister of Pakistan from 16 November 2007 to 25 March 2008 to oversee the 2008 General Elections and became the 5th Acting President of Pakistan upon the resignation of Pervez Musharraf on 18 August 2008, both by virtue of his office of the Chairman of the Senate.

== Professional career ==
An internationally recognised professional banker, Soomro held various top positions both at home and abroad in national and international organisations.

He has also worked in important positions for major banks:

- Bank of America
- general manager and chief executive officer of International Bank of Yemen
- Faysal Islamic Bank of Bahrain
- MCB Bank
- Zarai Taraqiati Bank Limited formally known as Agriculture Development Bank of Pakistan
- Federal Bank of Cooperatives
- President, National Bank of Pakistan

Soomro earned great recognition for his achievements during his time with these organisations. He was also instrumental in the establishment of microcredit banking in Pakistan.

He also held a position at the board of directors of Shell Pakistan Ltd.

== Political career ==
=== Governorship ===
Soomro's public service role started with his appointment as the Governor of Sindh on 25 May 2000.

=== Chairman of the Senate ===
Soomro resigned from the office of Sindh Governor on 26 December 2002 to contest the Senate elections. He was elected as a Senator on 23 February 2003 and was subsequently elected as Chairman of the Senate on 12 March 2003.

=== Caretaker Prime Minister ===
Soomro was appointed as caretaker prime minister on 15 November 2007, at the expiration of the term of the previous prime minister, Shaukat Aziz, ahead of a new parliamentary election. On 16 November, Soomro was sworn in as prime minister by President Pervez Musharraf. His term ended on 25 March 2008, when Syed Yousaf Raza Gilani was sworn in as prime minister.

=== Acting President of Pakistan ===
As required by the constitution, Soomro (in his position as Chairman of the Senate) automatically became acting President on 18 August 2008, upon the resignation of Pervez Musharraf. The constitution also required that a new President be elected by Parliament within 30 days.

Asif Ali Zardari was elected President and subsequently sworn in on 9 September 2008, succeeding Soomro.

=== Trustee of ILM Trust and Member of UMT Board of Governors ===
Soomro is a trustee of ILM Trust and member of UMT Board of Governors. UMT is a non-profit private-sector research university located in Lahore, Pakistan. In the recent QS Rankings, UMT was placed amongst the Top 500 universities of Asia.

== See also ==
- Acting President of Pakistan
- Prime Minister of Pakistan
- Chief Justice of Pakistan
- Chief of Army Staff of the Pakistan Army
- Constitution of Pakistan

Political offices
Preceded by Azim Daudpota	Governor of Sindh; 2000–2002	Succeeded by Ishrat-ul-Ibad Khan
Preceded by Wasim Sajjad	Chairman of the Senate; 2003–2007	Succeeded by Jan Mohammad Jamali; Acting
Preceded by Shaukat Aziz	Prime Minister of Pakistan; Caretaker; 2007–2008	Succeeded by Yousaf Raza Gillani
Preceded by Jan Mohammad Jamali; Acting	Chairman of the Senate; 2008	Succeeded by Jan Mohammad Jamali; Acting
Preceded by Pervez Musharraf	President of Pakistan; Acting; 2008	Succeeded by Asif Ali Zardari
Preceded by Jan Mohammad Jamali; Acting	Chairman of the Senate; 2008–2009	Succeeded by Farooq Naek
