= Jacobabad =

Jacobabad: جيڪب آباد (Sindhi); جیکب آباد (Urdu)
- City
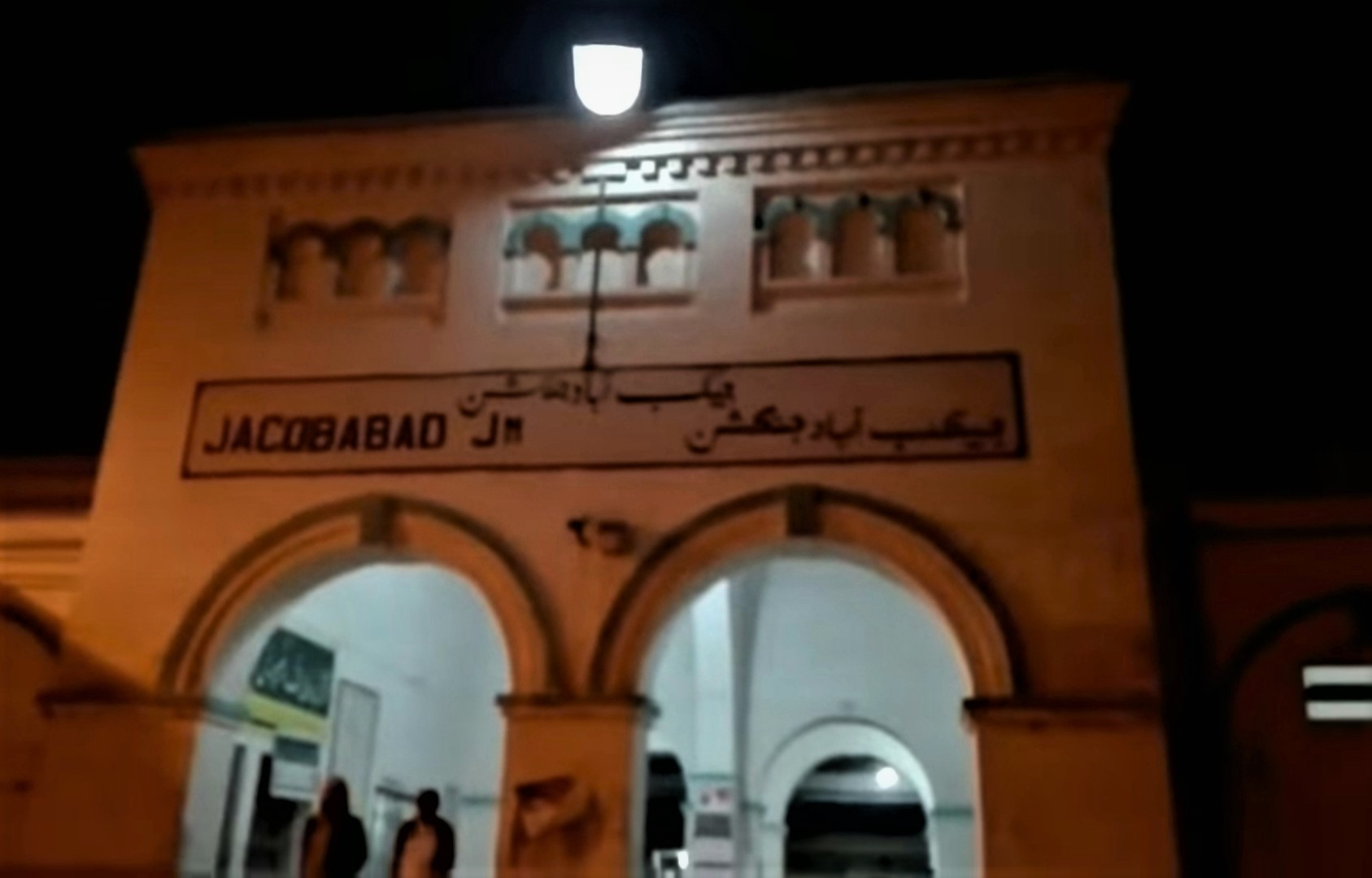
- Jacobabad Junction railway station

- Location of Jacobabad Jacobabad (Pakistan)
- Coordinates: 28°16′53″N 68°26′11″E
- Country: Pakistan
- Province: Sindh
- Division: Larkana Division
- District: Jacobabad District
- Founded: 1847

Government
  - Type: Municipal Committee
  - Chairman: Ghulam Abbas
  - Vice-Chairman: Mohammad Asif

Population (2023)
  - City: 219,315
  - Rank: 47th in Pakistan
- Time zone: UTC+5 (PST)
- Highways: N-65

Jacobabad, (Sindhi: جيڪب آباد; Urdu: جیکب آباد) is a city in Sindh, Pakistan, serving as both the capital city of Jacobabad District and the administrative centre of Jacobabad Taluka, an administrative subdivision of the district. The city itself is subdivided into eight Union Councils. Sitting far to the northwest of the province, near the provincial boundaries of Sindh and Balochistan, Jacobabad became a city on the site of an existing village (Khangarh), and is crossed by the Pakistan Railways and many main roads of the province. It is the 47th most populous city in Pakistan.

The city is one of the hottest places on earth, with summer temperatures regularly rising to a mean temperature of 37 °C (99 °F). In particular, compounded by the humidity and climate change, Jacobabad has several times exceeded a wet-bulb temperature of 35 °C (95 °F), above which the human body cannot sufficiently cool itself. Jacobabad has been cited as one of the world's most vulnerable places to global warming, and one where the difference between 1.5 °C and 2 °C can be the difference between life and death.

== Etymology ==
The city is named after Brigadier-General John Jacob CB (1812–1858), an officer of the British East India Company who ruled this region during the last decade of his life. He is also known for the cavalry regiment called 36th Jacob's Horse. Jacob was a graduate of Addiscombe Military Seminary. He was commissioned into the Bombay Artillery (Bombay Army) on his 16th birthday, and subsequently sailed for India in January 1828, never to set foot in England again. According to travel writer Salman Rashid, it was local residents "who took to calling the new settlement ‘Jekumbad’", later renamed to Jacobabad by the British rulers. The scale of progress and prosperity Jacob's works brought to the region can be appreciated by comparing those regions' relative prosperity at the time, compared to areas which were not under his administrative jurisdiction.

== History ==
In 1847 Jacob was placed in political charge of the frontier and established his headquarters at the village of Khangurh (or Khanger). He started building infrastructure for the town around the village. Being an architect and an engineer himself, he designed and then executed the plans of laying a wide road network around the town that measured a good 600 miles (965 km). In that he resolved the problem of unavailability of potable water for the residents by excavating a tank that contained water brought from Indus through a canal. His biggest and most important feat was the excavation of Begaree Canal, originating from Guddu barrage on river Indus, going round the district irrigating thousands of acres of land previously uncultivated, thereby providing means of living to thousands of people.

After the British Raj, the city was ruled by a Sardar, Azad Khan Jakhrani. This city is mostly populated by Baloch tribes.

In November 2010, then Prime Minister Yousaf Raza Gillani announced that University of Information Technology would be established in Jacobabad.

== Demographics ==
=== Population ===
Historical population

Year	Pop.	±%
1951	22,827	—
1961	35,278	+54.5%
1972	57,596	+63.3%
1981	79,365	+37.8%

Year	Pop.	±%
1998	138,780	+74.9%
2017	191,098	+37.7%
2023	219,315	+14.8%

According to 2023 census, Jacobabad had a population of 219,315.

=== Languages ===
Languages of Jacobabad MC (2023 Census)
1. Sindhi (90.2%)
2. Balochi (5.09%)
3. Saraiki (1.94%)
4. Urdu (1.27%)
5. Others (1.56%)

According to the 2023 Census of Pakistan, in Jacobabad City, Sindhi is overwhelmingly dominant, spoken by 90.16% of the population. Balochi accounts for 5.09%, followed by Saraiki at 1.94% and Urdu at 1.27%, Brahvi speakers make up 1.00% of the speakers and 0.56% spoke other languages of Pakistan. (Note: Language Data taken from the Urban Population of Jacobabad Taluka, as it corresponds with Jacobabad MC borders and population)

=== Religion ===
Religious groups in Jacobabad City (1881−2023)
Religious group	1881		1891		1901		1911		1921		1931		1941		2017		2023	
Religious group	Pop.	%	Pop.	%	Pop.	%	Pop.	%	Pop.	%	Pop.	%	Pop.	%	Pop.	%	Pop.	%
Islam	6,386	56.25%	6,786	54.74%	5,973	55.37%	4,804	42.29%	5,268	49.78%	7,783	49.42%	9,774	45.28%	176,053	92.13%	203,933	92.99%
Hinduism (Note: Includes Castes (Hindu Jati), Scheduled Castes, Scheduled Castes and Scheduled Tribes/Tribals, Nanakpanthis, Prarthana Samaj, and Brahmoism.)	4,744	41.79%	5,473	44.15%	4,762	44.15%	6,339	55.8%	5,244	49.55%	7,850	49.85%	11,561	53.55%	14,488	7.58%	13,929	6.35%
Christianity	210	1.85%	126	1.02%	33	0.31%	16	0.14%	10	0.09%	15	0.1%	12	0.06%	500	0.26%	1,008	0.46%
Zoroastrianism	6	0.05%	7	0.06%	0	0%	5	0.04%	0	0%	2	0.01%	0	0%	—N/a	—N/a	0	0%
Judaism	3	0.03%	4	0.03%	0	0%	0	0%	0	0%	0	0%	0	0%	—N/a	—N/a	—N/a	—N/a
Jainism	3	0.03%	0	0%	0	0%	0	0%	0	0%	4	0%	0	0%	—N/a	—N/a	—N/a	—N/a
Buddhism	0	0%	0	0%	0	0%	0	0%	0	0%	0	0%	0	0%	—N/a	—N/a	—N/a	—N/a
Sikhism	—N/a	—N/a	—N/a	—N/a	—N/a	—N/a	197	1.73%	61	0.58%	94	0.6%	241	1.12%	—N/a	—N/a	198	0.09%
Ahmadiyya	—N/a	—N/a	—N/a	—N/a	—N/a	—N/a	—N/a	—N/a	—N/a	—N/a	—N/a	—N/a	—N/a	—N/a	0	0%	7	0%
Others	0	0%	0	0%	0	0%	0	0%	0	0%	0	0%	0	0%	57	0.03%	240	0.11%
Total population	11,352	100%	12,396	100%	10,787	100%	11,361	100%	10,583	100%	15,748	100%	21,588	100%	191,098	100%	219,315	100%
1881–1941: Data for the entirety of the town of Jacobabad, which included Jacobabad Municipality and Jacobabad Cantonment. 2017–2023: Urban population of Jacobabad Taluka.

== Climate ==
Jacobabad has a hot desert climate (Köppen BWh) with extremely hot summers and mild winters. The city is well known for consistently having among the highest temperatures in South Asia, with a mean summer temperature of 37 °C (99 °F). The highest recorded temperature is 52.8 °C (127.0 °F), and the lowest recorded temperature is −3.9 °C (25.0 °F). Rainfall is low and mainly occurs in the monsoon season (July–September). The average annual rainfall of Jacobabad is 202.5 millimetres or 7.97 inches based upon the 1991 to 2020 period. The highest annual rainfall ever is 838.7 millimetres or 33.02 inches, recorded in 2022, and the lowest annual rainfall ever is 3.3 millimetres or 0.13 inches, recorded in 1922.

In the 2022 South Asian heat wave, Jacobabad's mean temperature for the month of May broke the all-time record with 43 °C (109.4 °F), reaching or exceeding 50 °C (122 °F) on four days. The city struggles to provide heat-mitigation measures. Many residents who are able to, migrate to higher-elevation Quetta during the summer school break.

Climate data for Jacobabad (1991–2020, extremes 1961–present)
Month	Jan	Feb	Mar	Apr	May	Jun	Jul	Aug	Sep	Oct	Nov	Dec	Year
Record high °C (°F)	30.6 (87.1)	34.0 (93.2)	42.1 (107.8)	47.0 (116.6)	52.5 (126.5)	51.1 (124.0)	47.8 (118.0)	45.0 (113.0)	42.8 (109.0)	41.7 (107.1)	38.0 (100.4)	30.6 (87.1)	52.5 (126.5)
Mean daily maximum °C (°F)	22.0 (71.6)	25.5 (77.9)	31.4 (88.5)	38.5 (101.3)	43.8 (110.8)	44.3 (111.7)	40.2 (104.4)	37.5 (99.5)	36.5 (97.7)	35.0 (95.0)	29.9 (85.8)	24.2 (75.6)	34.1 (93.4)
Daily mean °C (°F)	15.1 (59.2)	18.5 (65.3)	24.2 (75.6)	30.7 (87.3)	35.7 (96.3)	37.1 (98.8)	34.9 (94.8)	33.1 (91.6)	31.5 (88.7)	28.1 (82.6)	22.4 (72.3)	16.9 (62.4)	27.4 (81.3)
Mean daily minimum °C (°F)	8.1 (46.6)	11.5 (52.7)	17.0 (62.6)	22.8 (73.0)	27.6 (81.7)	30.0 (86.0)	29.6 (85.3)	28.5 (83.3)	26.7 (80.1)	21.1 (70.0)	14.9 (58.8)	9.5 (49.1)	20.6 (69.1)
Record low °C (°F)	−1.1 (30.0)	1.0 (33.8)	6.0 (42.8)	13.5 (56.3)	18.9 (66.0)	21.0 (69.8)	20.3 (68.5)	22.8 (73.0)	17.8 (64.0)	12.0 (53.6)	3.9 (39.0)	0.3 (32.5)	−1.1 (30.0)
Average rainfall mm (inches)	4.6 (0.18)	8.4 (0.33)	11.0 (0.43)	4.9 (0.19)	4.0 (0.16)	26.8 (1.06)	47.8 (1.88)	54.5 (2.15)	38.2 (1.50)	1.6 (0.06)	11.5 (0.45)	8.7 (0.34)	212.0 (8.35)
Average rainy days (≥ 1.0 mm)	1.2	1.6	1.9	1.0	0.7	0.7	1.9	1.7	0.6	0.3	0.3	0.9	12.8
Average relative humidity (%)	47	40	37	30	26	41	56	63	59	46	45	50	45
Mean monthly sunshine hours	241.9	214.7	247.5	249.4	266.4	272.7	236.0	259.8	278.1	288.8	267.6	243.7	3,066.6
Source: NOAA (sun 1961–1990), Deutscher Wetterdienst (humidity 1952–1967)

== Airport and airbase ==
The commercial airport at Jacobabad, about 500 kilometres (300 mi) north of Karachi and 500 km (300 mi) southeast of Kandahar, is located on the border between Sindh and Balochistan provinces. The Shahbaz Air Base (co-located with the commercial airport in Jacobabad) was one of three Pakistani air bases used by U.S. and allied forces to support the Operation Enduring Freedom campaign in Afghanistan and reportedly ongoing drone strikes in North Western Pakistan tribal regions.

== See also ==
- Jacobabad Junction railway station
- Thul
- Jacobabad District
