= 2018 Sindh provincial election =

Pakistani provincial election

- 25 July 2018

130 out of 168 seats in the Sindh Assembly 85 seats needed for a majority
- Opinion polls
- Turnout: 48.11%(▼6.51%)
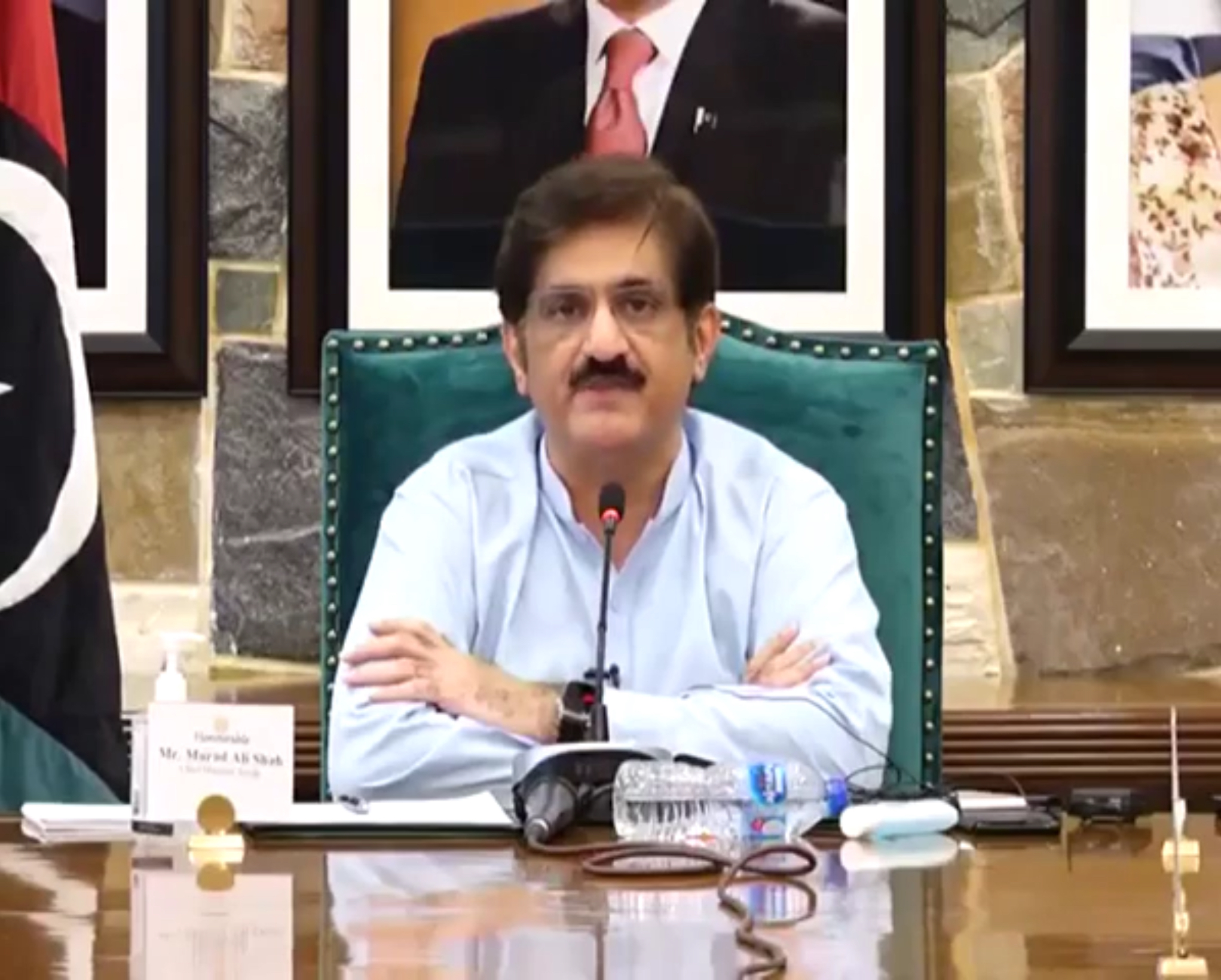

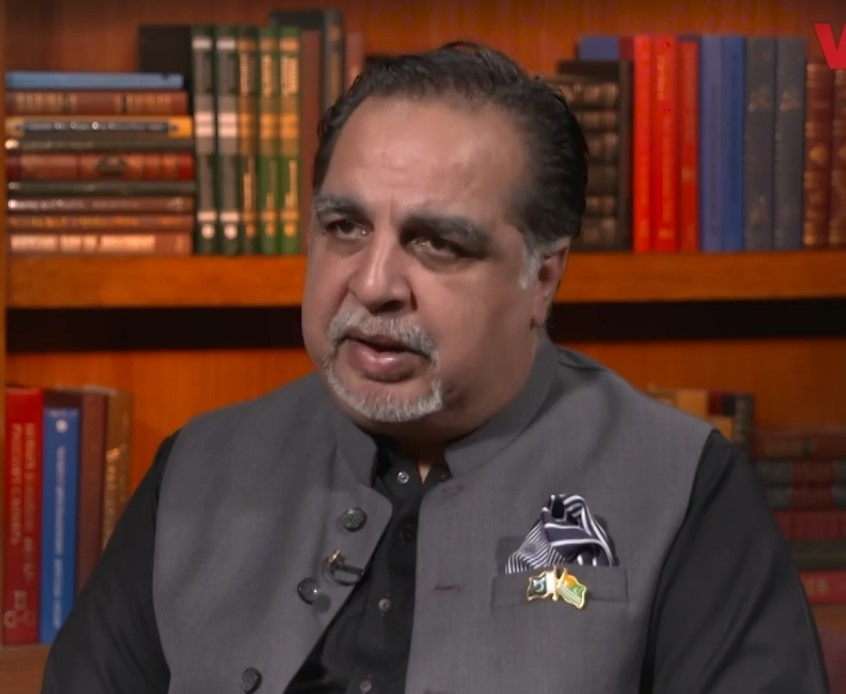

	First party	Second party	Third party
Leader	Murad Ali Shah	Imran Ismail	Khawaja Izharul Hassan
Party	PPP	PTI	MQM-P
Leader's seat	Jamshoro-I	Karachi South-V	Karachi Central-II
Last election	91 seats, 32.63%	4 seats, 6.08%	51 seats, 25.53%
Seats won	98	30	21
Seat change	▲7	▲26	▼30
Popular vote	3,853,081	1,435,813	773,951
Percentage	38.44%	14.47%	7.65%
Swing	▲5.81pp	▲8.39pp	▼17.88pp
- Map of Sindh showing Assembly Constituencies and winning Parties
Chief Minister before election
Murad Ali Shah
PPP
Elected Chief Minister
Murad Ali Shah
PPP

Provincial elections were held in the Pakistani province of Sindh to elect the members of the 13th Provincial Assembly of Sindh on 25 July 2018, alongside nationwide general elections and three other provincial elections in Khyber Pakhtunkhwa, Balochistan and Punjab. The remaining two territories of Pakistan, AJK and Gilgit-Baltistan, were ineligible to vote due to their disputed status.

== Background ==
Following the 2013 elections, despite a significant drop in vote share, the left-wing Pakistan Peoples Party remained the largest party in the assembly and held a comfortable majority with 91 seats. They were followed by the secularist, Muhajir-centric, Muttahida Qaumi Movement, which repeated its 2008 exploits, by securing 51 seats. New additions into the assembly included Pakistan Tehreek-e-Insaf, a welfarist, anti-establishment party led by former cricketer Imran Khan, who emerged as the second largest party in Karachi and gained 4 seats. Meanwhile, Pakistan Muslim League (F), PPP's perennial rival in Interior Sindh, held 11 seats.

Following the elections for the slot of chief ministership, Pakistan Peoples Party was easily able to form a government in Sindh for the ninth time in its existence. Party veteran Qaim Ali Shah was elected in the role of provincial chief minister for the third time in his career, and remained at the position until 2016 when he stepped down and was replaced by Syed Murad Ali Shah.

=== MQM Splits ===
During this tenure, MQM ceased to exist as single party due to internal rifts in the wake of the party's leader, Altaf Hussain, giving a controversial speech in August, 2016. It split into MQM-Pakistan and MQM-London, the former in control of Farooq Sattar, while the latter managed by Hussain, who is in self-imposed exile in London since 1991.

Meanwhile, Mustafa Kamal's nascent Pak Sarzameen Party chipped away at MQM-P members. Kamal himself being a former MQM stalwart and erstwhile Mayor of Karachi, who formed the PSP on 23 March 2016.

Further still, in the lead up to 2018 Senate elections, the MQM-P faction saw another split - into Sattar's MQM-PIB and Aamir Khan's MQM-Bahadruabad. The reason for the split being grievances over the allotment of Senate tickets.

=== Rise of PTI in Karachi ===
In Karachi, Pakistan Tehreek-e-Insaf was seen as a better alternative for the city because of the increasing support and popularity of Imran Khan with the help of the establishment. In May 2018 PTI Chairman presented ten-point Karachi agenda which included holding direct mayoral elections and improving the education system, healthcare and hospitals, police, business and industry, power shortages, playgrounds and sporting facilities, environment, sewerage and the circular railway, this also attracted many people of Karachi to support PTI which never been materialized at any stage.

PTI won 21 Sindh Assembly Seats out of 43 and 14 National Assembly Seat from Karachi and emerged as the largest party in Karachi in terms of vote bank and seats. Nearly 0.7 Million Karachi citizens voted for Pakistan Tehreek-e-Insaf.

== Results ==
98	30	21	14	4
PPP	PTI	MQM	GDA	OTH

Vote Share of different parties in the election.
1. PPP (38.4%)
2. GDA (15.1%)
3. PTI (14.5%)
4. MQM (7.65%)
5. MMA (6.00%)
6. TLP (4.51%)
7. PML(N) (2.00%)
8. PSP (1.61%)
9. IND & OTH (10.2%)
Seat Share of different parties in the election.
1. PPP (58.9%)
2. PTI (17.9%)
3. MQM (12.5%)
4. GDA (8.33%)
5. TLP (1.79%)
6. MMA (0.60%)

Party	Votes	%	Contested	Seats				+/-
Party	Votes	%	Contested	General	Women	Minorities	Total	+/-
Pakistan People’s Party	38,53,904	38.44	128	76	17	5	98	▲7
Pakistan Tehreek-e-Insaf	14,51,132	14.47	97	23	5	2	30	▲26
Muttahida Qaumi Movement - Pakistan	7,66,789	7.65	61	16	4	1	21	▼30
Grand Democratic Alliance	15,14,775	15.11	83	11	2	1	14	New entry
Tehreek-e-Labbaik Pakistan	4,52,109	4.51	67	2	1	0	3	New entry
Jamiat Ulema-e-Islam (F)	6,01,131	6.00	107	1	0	0	1	▲1
Pakistan Muslim League (N)	2,45,415	2.00	68	0	0	0	0	▼4
Pak Sarzameen Party	1,61,860	1.61	77	0	0	0	0	New entry
Independents & Others	9.78,897	10.21	1,506	0	0	0	0	
Postponed				1	0	0	1	
Total Valid Votes	10,026,012	96.08						
Invalid/Blank Votes	4,08,538	3.92						
Total Votes polled	1,04,34,550	100	2,194	130	29	9	168	0
Registered voters/Turnout	2,18,28,628	47.80	–					
Source: Note: The election was postponed in PS-87 Malir-I due to the death of a major candidate.

=== Division-wise results ===
Division	Total seats	PPP	PTI	MQM-P	GDA	Others
Larkana	17	14	1	0	2	0
Sukkur	15	11	1	0	3	0
Nawabshah	14	10	0	0	4	0
Mirpur Khas	11	10	0	0	1	0
Hyderabad	29	25	0	3	1	0
Karachi	44	6	21	13	0	3
Total	130	76	23	16	11	3

=== District-wise results ===
Division	District	Total seats	PPP	PTI	MQM-P	GDA	Others
Larkana	Jacobabad	3	2	1	0	0	0
Larkana	Kashmore	3	3	0	0	0	0
Larkana	Shikarpur	3	2	0	0	1	0
Larkana	Larkana	4	3	0	0	1	0
Larkana	Qambar Shahdadkot	4	4	0	0	0	0
Sukkur	Ghotki	4	2	1	0	1	0
Sukkur	Sukkur	4	4	0	0	0	0
Sukkur	Khairpur	7	5	0	0	2	0
Nawabshah	Naushahro Feroz	4	3	0	0	1	0
Nawabshah	Nawabshah	4	4	0	0	0	0
Nawabshah	Sanghar	6	3	0	0	3	0
Mirpur Khas	Mirpur Khas	4	4	0	0	0	0
Mirpur Khas	Umerkot	3	3	0	0	0	0
Mirpur Khas	Tharparkar	4	3	0	0	1	0
Hyderabad	Matiari	2	2	0	0	0	0
Hyderabad	Tando Allahyar	2	2	0	0	0	0
Hyderabad	Hyderabad	6	3	0	3	0	0
Hyderabad	Tando Muhammad Khan	2	2	0	0	0	0
Hyderabad	Badin	5	4	0	0	1	0
Hyderabad	Sujawal	2	2	0	0	0	0
Hyderabad	Thatta	3	3	0	0	0	0
Hyderabad	Jamshoro	3	3	0	0	0	0
Hyderabad	Dadu	4	4	0	0	0	0
Karachi	Malir	5	4	0	0	0	0
Karachi	Korangi	7	0	2	5	0	0
Karachi	East	8	1	7	0	0	0
Karachi	South	5	0	3	0	0	2
Karachi	West	11	1	5	4	0	1
Karachi	Central	8	0	4	4	0	0
Total		130	76	23	16	11	3

=== Constituency-wise results ===
District	Constituency		Winner				Runner Up				Margin	Turnout %
District	No.	Name	Candidate	Party	Votes	%	Candidate	Party	Votes	%	Margin	Turnout %
Jacobabad	PS-1	Jacobabad-I	Muhammad Aslam Abro	PTI	36,988	53.05	Mir Aurangzeb Panhwar	PPP	25,260	36.23	11,728	43.90
Jacobabad	PS-2	Jacobabad-II	Sohrab Khan Sarki	PPP	30,174	44.91	Tahir Hussain Khan Khoso	PTI	23,314	34.70	6,860	46.24
Jacobabad	PS-3	Jacobabad-III	Mumtaz Hussain Khan	PPP	31,662	47.52	Abdul Razzaq Khoso	PTI	28,138	42.53	3,524	45.97
Kashmore	PS-4	Kashmore-I	Abdul Rauf Khoso	PPP	36,765	58.76	Mir Ghalib Hussain Domki	PTI	23,377	37.36	13,388	44.16
Kashmore	PS-5	Kashmore-II	Ghulam Abid Khan	PPP	29,901	56.34	Rab Nawaz	MMA	19,674	37.07	10,227	37.85
Kashmore	PS-6	Kashmore-III	Mir Shabbir Bijarani	PPP	Elected Unopposed							
Shikarpur	PS-7	Shikarpur-I	Imtiaz Ahmed Shaikh	PPP	50,311	51.82	Agha Taimoor Khan	GDA	30,872	31.70	19,439	48.41
Shikarpur	PS-8	Shikarpur-II	Muhammad Shaharyar Khan Mahar	GDA	37,714	39.48	Ameer Ali Jatoi	IND	26,893	28.15	10,821	55.84
Shikarpur	PS-9	Shikarpur-III	Agha Siraj Durrani	PPP	51,660	58.34	Muzaffar Ali Issani	GDA	15,059	17.01	36,601	46.04
Larkana	PS-10	Larkana-I	Faryal Talpur	PPP	53,674	56.43	Ameer Bux Bhutto	PTI	37,732	39.67	15,942	53.97
Larkana	PS-11	Larkana-II	Moazzam Ali Khan	GDA	32,206	54.93	Nida Khuhro	PPP	21,825	37.23	10,381	41.12
Larkana	PS-12	Larkana-III	Sohail Anwar Siyal	PPP	49,024	58.70	Syed Akbar Hussain	GDA	22,634	27.10	26,390	48.32
Larkana	PS-13	Larkana-IV	Hizbullah Bughio	PPP	46,141	46.37	Aadil Altaf Unar	GDA	44,242	44.46	1,899	57.11
Qambar Shahadkot	PS-14	Qambar Shahdadkot-I	Mir Nadir Ali Khan Magsi	PPP	32,388	52.17	Muzafar Ali Brohi	GDA	10,350	16.67	22,038	41.93
Qambar Shahadkot	PS-15	Qambar Shahdadkot-II	Ghanwer Ali Khan Isran	PPP	40,220	61.74	Safdar Ali Abbasi	GDA	18,819	28.89	21,401	43.57
Qambar Shahadkot	PS-16	Qambar Shahdadkot-III	Sardar Khan Chandio	PPP	42,180	90.53	Nawab Uddin	PPP-SB	2,548	5.47	39,632	31.76
Qambar Shahadkot	PS-17	Qambar Shahdadkot-IV	Burhan Chandio	PPP	40,079	68.05	Aqil Khan	PTI	7,080	12.02	32,999	40.12
Ghotki	PS-18	Ghotki-I	Shahar Yar Khan Shar	PTI	50,343	48.58	Jam Mehtab Hussain Dehar	PPP	39,322	37.94	11,021	60.97
Ghotki	PS-19	Ghotki-II	Abdul Bari Pitafi	PPP	45,422	45.20	Ali Gohar Khan Mahar	GDA	42,201	41.99	3,221	56.17
Ghotki	PS-20	Ghotki-III	Ali Gohar Khan Mahar	GDA	41,572	60.29	Ali Nawaz Khan Mehar	PPP	12,689	18.40	28,883	46.91
Ghotki	PS-21	Ghotki-IV	Ali Nawaz Khan Mehar	PPP	32,241	37.74	Jam Saifullah Khan	MMA	28,604	33.48	3,637	53.75
Sukkur	PS-22	Sukkur-I	Ikramullah Khan Dharejo	PPP	32,984	43.84	Ali Gohar Khan Mahar	GDA	26,015	34.57	6,969	55.36
Sukkur	PS-23	Sukkur-II	Awais Qadir Shah	PPP	43,737	50.10	Muhammad Ali	GDA	36,598	41.93	7,139	61.43
Sukkur	PS-24	Sukkur-III	Syed Farukh Ahmed Shah	PPP	34,027	43.64	Muhammad Zubair Hafeez	MMA	10,448	13.40	23,579	45.13
Sukkur	PS-25	Sukkur-IV	Nasir Hussain Shah	PPP	42,503	48.22	Ameer Bux Alyas Mir	IND	21,364	24.24	21,139	47.71
Khairpur	PS-26	Khairpur-I	Qaim Ali Shah	PPP	48,271	60.33	Abdul Ghaffar Sheikh	GDA	28,129	35.15	20,142	50.19
Khairpur	PS-27	Khairpur-II	Munawar Ali Wassan	PPP	46,557	62.28	Mian Zaheer Abbas Talpur	IND	24,115	32.26	22,442	51.76
Khairpur	PS-28	Khairpur-III	Sajid Ali Banbhan	PPP	40,524	51.62	Syed Masooq Mohyuddin Shah	GDA	29,304	37.33	11,220	57.06
Khairpur	PS-29	Khairpur-IV	Muhammad Rafique	GDA	37,135	47.27	Shiraz Shokat Rajper	PPP	36,234	46.12	901	57.19
Khairpur	PS-30	Khairpur-V	Syed Ahmed Raza Shah Jeelani	PPP	39,035	52.31	Ghulam Rasool Sahito	GDA	22,575	30.25	16,460	50.94
Khairpur	PS-31	Khairpur-VI	Naeem Ahmed Kharal	PPP	36,429	50.45	Ismail Shah	GDA	28,712	39.77	7,717	49.13
Khairpur	PS-32	Khairpur-VII	Muhammad Rashid Shah	GDA	36,285	49.93	Nawab Ali Wassan	PPP	32,077	44.14	4,208	50.71
Naushahro Feroze	PS-33	Naushahro Feroze-I	Syed Serfraz Hussain Shah	PPP	52,974	53.72	Maqsood Ali Khushik	GDA	37,466	37.99	15,508	56.90
Naushahro Feroze	PS-34	Naushahro Feroze-II	Murad Ali Shah	PPP	51,476	47.72	Abdul Sattar Rajper	GDA	32,451	30.08	19,025	54.41
Naushahro Feroze	PS-35	Naushahro Feroze-III	Mumtaz Ali Chandio	PPP	38,440	39.98	Raza Ali Khan Jatoi	GDA	35,040	36.44	3,400	55.38
Naushahro Feroze	PS-36	Naushahro Feroze-IV	Arif Mustafa Jatoi	GDA	47,557	48.98	Zia Ul Hassan	PPP	45,850	47.22	1,707	54.38
Nawabshah	PS-37	Nawabshah-I	Azra Fazal Pechuho	PPP	55,525	59.79	Syed Bagh Ali Shah	GDA	24,640	26.53	30,885	49.78
Nawabshah	PS-38	Nawabshah-II	Tariq Masood Arain	PPP	47,405	50.03	Naeem Akhtar	MQM	14,889	15.71	32,516	44.23
Nawabshah	PS-39	Nawabshah-III	Ghulam Qadir Chandio	PPP	58,159	58.42	Syed Zain ul Abdin	SUP	33,561	33.71	24,598	59.79
Nawabshah	PS-40	Nawabshah-IV	Khan Muhammad Dahri	PPP	56,755	63.93	Asif Ali Shah	GDA	19,837	22.35	36,918	52.01
Sanghar	PS-41	Sanghar-I	Ali Ghulam Nizamani	GDA	36,081	46.73	Mashooque Ali	PPP	35,935	46.54	146	51.33
Sanghar	PS-42	Sanghar-II	Qazi Shams-ud-Din Rajar	GDA	44,636	52.69	Ali Hassan	PPP	35,059	41.39	9,577	59.86
Sanghar	PS-43	Sanghar-III	Jam Madad Ali Khan	PPP	44,750	59.01	Jam Zulfiqar Ali Khan	GDA	28,495	37.57	16,255	55.43
Sanghar	PS-44	Sanghar-IV	Faraz Dero	PPP	54,156	70.87	Niaz Hussain	GDA	13,711	17.94	40,445	45.53
Sanghar	PS-45	Sanghar-V	Shahid Abdul Salam Thahim	PPP	45,818	56.05	Muhammad Bux	GDA	31,206	38.17	14,612	50.43
Sanghar	PS-46	Sanghar-VI	Waryam Faqqeer	GDA	42,472	48.43	Rana Abdul Sattar	PPP	41,549	47.38	923	58.60
Mirpur Khas	PS-47	Mirpur Khas-I	Hari Ram Kishori Lal	PPP	33,793	36.69	Mujeeb Ul Haq	MQM	23,840	25.88	9,953	48.28
Mirpur Khas	PS-48	Mirpur Khas-II	Syed Zulfiqar Ali Shah	PPP	38,112	48.20	Syed Ali Nawaz Shah Rizvi	IND	36,271	45.87	1,841	54.25
Mirpur Khas	PS-49	Mirpur Khas-III	Noor Ahmed Bhurgri	PPP	53,006	57.99	Shuja Muhammad Shah	IND	32,085	35.12	20,921	53.70
Mirpur Khas	PS-50	Mirpur Khas-IV	Mir Tariq Ali Khan Talpur	PPP	50,258	58.60	Inayat Ullah	GDA	27,609	32.19	22,649	53.68
Umerkot	PS-51	Umerkot-I	Syed Sardar Ali Shah	PPP	58,680	61.86	Faqir Muhammad Jadam Mangiro	GDA	29,842	31.46	28,838	58.69
Umerkot	PS-52	Umerkot-II	Syed Mardan Ali Shah	PPP	52,647	60.55	Arbab Ghulam Rahim	GDA	32,148	36.97	20,499	66.71
Umerkot	PS-53	Umerkot-III	Nawab Muhammad Taimur Talpur	PPP	55,351	59.93	Dost Muhammad	PTI	31,689	34.31	23,662	62.62
Tharparkar	PS-54	Tharparkar-I	Abdul Razzaque Rahimoon	GDA	26,510	41.08	Dost Muhammad	PPP	25,403	39.37	1,107	69.40
Tharparkar	PS-55	Tharparkar-II	Muhammad Qasim Soomro	PPP	47,344	51.20	Arbab Anwar Jabbar	GDA	33,215	35.92	14,129	69.66
Tharparkar	PS-56	Tharparkar-III	Fakeer Sher Muhammad Bilalani	PPP	55,160	51.78	Arbab Togachi Fawad Razzaq	GDA	33,369	31.32	21,791	73.92
Tharparkar	PS-57	Tharparkar-IV	Arbab Lutfullah	PPP	65,829	55.92	Arbab Ghulam Rahim	GDA	44,675	37.95	21,154	69.31
Matiari	PS-58	Matiari-I	Makhdoom Mehboob Zaman	PPP	56,829	59.81	Naseer Ahmed	GDA	34,648	36.47	22,181	54.48
Matiari	PS-59	Matiari-II	Makhdoom Rafik Zaman	PPP	46,334	54.98	Syed Jalal Shah	GDA	24,377	28.93	21,957	53.63
Tando Allahyar	PS-60	Tando Allahyar-I	Syed Zia Abbas Shah	PPP	51,325	51.52	Ali Ahmed Palh	PTI	34,761	34.89	16,564	51.58
Tando Allahyar	PS-61	Tando Allahyar-II	Imdad Ali Pitafi	PPP	47,394	52.63	Khair Muhammad Khokhar	GDA	38,990	43.30	8,404	57.30
Hyderabad	PS-62	Hyderabad-I	Jam Khan	PPP	35,278	63.80	Ayaz Latif Pilijo	GDA	13,636	24.66	21,642	43.04
Hyderabad	PS-63	Hyderabad-II	Sharjeel Memon	PPP	44,265	56.00	Muhammad Ali Qazi	TPP	22,607	28.60	21,658	51.81
Hyderabad	PS-64	Hyderabad-III	Abdul Jabbar Khan	PPP	21,896	31.14	Muhammad Younis	MQM	18,292	26.01	3,604	42.60
Hyderabad	PS-65	Hyderabad-IV	Nadeem Ahmed Siddiqui	MQM	28,170	35.08	Mustansar Billah	PTI	21,355	26.60	6,815	38.32
Hyderabad	PS-66	Hyderabad-V	Mohammad Rashid Khilji	MQM	27,491	34.39	Azhar Muhammad Shaikh	PTI	19,680	24.62	7,811	38.66
Hyderabad	PS-67	Hyderabad-VI	Nasir Hussain Qureshi	MQM	22,563	34.46	Umaid Ali Junejo	PTI	13,403	20.47	9,160	41.63
Tando Muhammad Khan	PS-68	Tando Muhammad Khan-I	Syed Aijaz Hussain Shah	PPP	32,665	42.82	Mir Ali Hyder Talpur	GDA	20,738	27.18	11,927	54.99
Tando Muhammad Khan	PS-69	Tando Muhammad Khan-II	Abdul Karim Soomro	PPP	32,109	50.80	Abdul Raheem Katiar	GDA	19,486	30.83	12,623	51.82
Badin	PS-70	Badin-I	Bashir Ahmed	PPP	44,415	61.27	Riaz Ahmed	GDA	23,137	31.92	21,278	53.71
Badin	PS-71	Badin-II	Allah Bux Talpur	PPP	38,550	48.95	Mir Abdullah Khan Talpur	GDA	33,047	41.96	5,503	52.41
Badin	PS-72	Badin-III	Hasnain Mirza	GDA	43,113	49.84	Syed Ali Bux Shah	PPP	35,795	41.38	7,318	56.14
Badin	PS-73	Badin-IV	Taj Muhammad Mallah	PPP	37,432	46.13	Fehmida Mirza	GDA	36,517	45.00	915	58.04
Badin	PS-74	Badin-V	Muhammad Ismail Rahoo	PPP	44,956	57.19	Zulfiqar Mirza	GDA	28,895	36.76	16,061	57.84
Sujawal	PS-75	Sujawal-I	Shah Hussain Shah Sheerazi	PPP	61,422	78.27	Muhammad Ismail Memon	MMA	7,362	9.38	54,060	43.55
Sujawal	PS-76	Sujawal-II	Muhammad Ali Malkani	PPP	49,980	67.73	Ghulam Muhammad Naeemi	TLP	17,832	24.17	32,148	48.80
Thatta	PS-77	Thatta-I	Riaz Hussain Shah Sheerazi	PPP	50,911	76.61	Arslan Bux Brohi	PTI	5,192	7.72	45,719	46.91
Thatta	PS-78	Thatta-II	Ali Hassan Zardari	PPP	48,835	84.40	Zaib Niazi	PTI	4,350	7.52	44,485	41.52
Thatta	PS-79	Thatta-III	Jam Awais Bijar Khan Jokhio	PPP	43,874	75.77	Mitho Khan Baloch	PTI	4,512	7.79	39,362	41.78
Jamshoro	PS-80	Jamshoro-I	Murad Ali Shah	PPP	50,467	62.94	Syed Jalal Mehmood	SUP	21,915	27.33	28,552	56.78
Jamshoro	PS-81	Jamshoro-II	Giyanoo Mal	PPP	34,957	52.14	Malik Changez Khan	IND	26,975	40.24	7,982	52.09
Jamshoro	PS-82	Jamshoro-III	Asad Sikandar	PPP	40,604	49.69	Sikandar Ali Sohro	IND	36,315	44.44	4,289	59.98
Dadu	PS-83	Dadu-I	Abdul Aziz Junejo	PPP	52,020	56.47	Ahsan Ali Jatoi	PTI	38,030	41.29	13,990	49.04
Dadu	PS-84	Dadu-II	Fayaz Ali Butt	PPP	42,232	47.92	Sadaqat Ali Jatoi	PTI	41,091	46.63	1,141	52.44
Dadu	PS-85	Dadu-III	Pir Mujeeb ul Haq	PPP	47,393	58.34	Ashique Ali Zahoor	PTI	26,795	32.98	20,598	47.41
Dadu	PS-86	Dadu-IV	Syed Salah Shah Jillani	PPP	43,720	50.05	Banda Ali Leghari	PTI	38,794	44.41	4,926	51.43
Malir	PS-87	Karachi Malir-I	Election Postponed									
Malir	PS-88	Karachi Malir-II	Muhammad Yousuf Baloch	PPP	22,563	34.84	Muhammad Rizwan Khan	PTI	16,392	25.31	6,171	44.51
Malir	PS-89	Karachi Malir-III	Muhammad Saleem Baloch	PPP	23,937	29.35	Syed Ali Hussain	PTI	18,800	23.05	5,137	42.95
Malir	PS-90	Karachi Malir-IV	Abdul Razak Raja	PPP	16,313	31.11	Shahid Iqbal Arain	PML(N)	9,371	17.87	6,942	44.43
Malir	PS-91	Karachi Malir-V	Mehmood Alam Jamot	PPP	17,880	28.71	Khalil Ur Rehman Jadoon	PTI	12,612	20.25	5,268	45.19
Korangi Karachi	PS-92	Karachi Korangi -I	Muhammad Hussain Khan	MQM	29,889	33.29	Abid Jillani	PTI	25,643	28.56	4,246	42.91
Korangi Karachi	PS-93	Karachi Korangi-II	Hamid Zafar	MQM	32,570	33.41	Waqas Iqbal	PTI	21,939	22.50	10,631	44.17
Korangi Karachi	PS-94	Karachi Korangi-III	Syed Hashim Raza Jilani	MQM	32,729	35.96	Muhammad Wajahat	TLP	14,030	15.42	18,699	37.61
Korangi Karachi	PS-95	Karachi Korangi-IV	Muhammad Javed Hanif Khan	MQM	21,524	36.39	Muhammad Mehboob Ur Rehman	TLP	11,643	19.68	9,880	36.36
Korangi Karachi	PS-96	Karachi Korangi-V	Ghulam Jellani	MQM	19,864	29.09	Muhammad Abu Bakar	TLP	18,962	27.77	902	38.24
Korangi Karachi	PS-97	Karachi Korangi-VI	Raja Azhar Khan	PTI	10,473	22.37	Waqar Hussain Shah	MQM	9,395	20.07	1,078	36.86
Korangi Karachi	PS-98	Karachi Korangi-VII	Adeel Ahmed	PTI	14,415	25.04	Masood Mehmood	MQM	13,006	22.59	1,409	37.03
Karachi East	PS-99	Karachi East-I	Haleem Adil Sheikh	PTI	6,029	28.63	Shahab uddin	PPP	5,402	25.65	627	38.03
Karachi East	PS-100	Karachi East-II	Kareem Bux Gabol	PTI	17,200	35.86	Taj Muhammad	PPP	7,351	15.32	9,849	38.79
Karachi East	PS-101	Karachi East-III	Syed Firdous Shamim Naqvi	PTI	28,036	44.84	Muhammad Haroon Siddiqui	MQM	11,534	18.45	16,502	40.63
Karachi East	PS-102	Karachi East-IV	Arsalan Taj Hussain	PTI	47,949	47.85	Muhammad Arsalan Khan	MQM	17,337	17.30	30,612	41.38
Karachi East	PS-103	Karachi East-V	Bilal Ahmed Ghaffar	PTI	41,454	43.82	Muhammad Junaid Mukati	MMA	17,729	18.74	23,725	41.15
Karachi East	PS-104	Karachi East-VI	Saeed Ghani	PPP	27,635	37.53	Irfanullah Khan Marwat	GDA	11,213	15.23	16,422	43.01
Karachi East	PS-105	Karachi East-VII	Muhammad Ali Aziz	PTI	28,882	32.94	Faisal Rafiq	MQM	20,284	23.14	8,598	37.24
Karachi East	PS-106	Karachi East-VIII	Jamal Uddin Siddiqui	PTI	25,840	33.76	Muhammad Zaid	MQM	13,163	17.20	12,677	37.93
Karachi South	PS-107	Karachi South-I	Muhammad Younus Soomro	TLP	26,498	30.32	Muhammad Asghar Khan	PTI	16,609	19.01	9,889	40.28
Karachi South	PS-108	Karachi South-II	Syed Abdul Rasheed	MMA	16,821	21.78	Abdul Nasir Baloch	PTI	15,579	20.17	1,242	38.13
Karachi South	PS-109	Karachi South-III	Ramzan Ghanchi	PTI	25,345	28.98	Ahmed	TLP	19,913	22.77	5,432	37.50
Karachi South	PS-110	Karachi South-IV	Khurrum Sher Zaman	PTI	38,884	41.46	Syed Najmi Alam	PPP	14,049	14.98	24,835	40.21
Karachi South	PS-111	Karachi South-V	Imran Ismail	PTI	30,578	41.77	Sufian	MMA	8,754	11.96	21,824	41.59
Karachi West	PS-112	Karachi West-I	Liaquat Ali Askani	PPP	11,971	24.73	Amjad Iqbal Afridi	PTI	9,394	19.40	2,577	38.36
Karachi West	PS-113	Karachi West-II	Shah Nawaz Jadoon	PTI	18,691	29.60	Humayun Muhammad Khan	PPP	14,967	23.70	3,724	43.79
Karachi West	PS-114	Karachi West-III	Muhammad Shabbir Qureshi	PTI	13,325	19.99	Syed Shahid Mian	MQM	12,129	18.19	1,196	38.07
Karachi West	PS-115	Karachi West-IV	Muhammad Qasim	TLP	21,596	27.08	Abdul Rehman	PTI	15,071	18.90	6,525	41.08
Karachi West	PS-116	Karachi West-V	Malik Shehzad Awan	PTI	9,966	28.60	Salheen	PML(N)	9,711	27.87	255	36.60
Karachi West	PS-117	Karachi West-VI	Sadaqat Hussain	MQM	25,441	29.66	Shakeel Ahmed	TLP	17,074	19.90	8,367	49.39
Karachi West	PS-118	Karachi West-VII	Adeel Shahzad	MQM	18,491	28.71	Malik Muhammad Arif Awan	PTI	12,938	20.09	5,553	36.56
Karachi West	PS-119	Karachi West-VIII	Ali Khursheedi	MQM	23,532	31.94	Shakeel Akhter	PTI	12,841	17.43	10,691	43.59
Karachi West	PS-120	Karachi West-IX	Saeed Ahmad Afridi	PTI	14,561	23.06	Ahmed Nadeem Mughal	MQM	12,110	19.18	2,451	36.92
Karachi West	PS-121	Karachi West-X	Basit Ahmed Siddiqui	MQM	9,936	22.78	Jan Muhammad Gabol	PTI	9,469	21.71	467	37.46
Karachi West	PS-122	Karachi West-XI	Rabistan Khan	PTI	6,244	21.04	Muhammad Mazahir Amir	MQM	5,476	18.46	768	38.59
Karachi Central	PS-123	Karachi Central-I	Waseemuddin Qureshi	MQM	28,161	36.49	Faizan Muslim	PTI	20,577	26.67	7,584	39.46
Karachi Central	PS-124	Karachi Central-II	Khawaja Izharul Hassan	MQM	26,162	35.05	Muhammad Farooq	TLP	17,909	24.00	8,253	36.70
Karachi Central	PS-125	Karachi Central-III	Abbas Jafri	PTI	30,687	30.84	Abdul Haseeb	MQM	26,818	26.95	3,869	40.44
Karachi Central	PS-126	Karachi Central-IV	Omar Omari	PTI	30,338	31.40	Asif Ali Khan	MQM	25,068	25.95	5,270	38.19
Karachi Central	PS-127	Karachi Central-V	Kunwar Naveed Jamil	MQM	29,939	38.53	Shaikh Mehboob Jilani	PTI	14,424	18.56	15,515	35.32
Karachi Central	PS-128	Karachi Central-VI	Muhammad Abbas Jafri	MQM	29,842	31.38	Nusrat Anwar	PTI	27,771	29.56	2,071	40.12
Karachi Central	PS-129	Karachi Central-VII	Syed Imran Ali Shah	PTI	39,101	41.30	Maaz Muqadam	MQM	17,697	18.69	21,404	41.47
Karachi Central	PS-130	Karachi Central-VIII	Muhammad Riaz Haider	PTI	38,356	36.80	Jamal Ahmed	MQM	33,984	32.60	4,372	41.03

=== Members elected on Reserved seats ===
Reserved Seats	Party	Member
Reserved for Women	Pakistan Peoples Party	Shehla Raza
Reserved for Women	Pakistan Peoples Party	Shaheena Sher Ali
Reserved for Women	Pakistan Peoples Party	Rehana Leghari
Reserved for Women	Pakistan Peoples Party	Hina Dastagir
Reserved for Women	Pakistan Peoples Party	Sadia Javed
Reserved for Women	Pakistan Peoples Party	Nida Khuhro
Reserved for Women	Pakistan Peoples Party	Shazia Umar
Reserved for Women	Pakistan Peoples Party	Ghazala Siyal
Reserved for Women	Pakistan Peoples Party	Shamim Mumtaz
Reserved for Women	Pakistan Peoples Party	Farhat Seemi
Reserved for Women	Pakistan Peoples Party	Tanzila Ume Habiba Qambrani
Reserved for Women	Pakistan Peoples Party	Sajeela Leghari
Reserved for Women	Pakistan Peoples Party	Sharmila Faruqui
Reserved for Women	Pakistan Peoples Party	Syeda Marvi Faseeh
Reserved for Women	Pakistan Peoples Party	Heer Soho
Reserved for Women	Pakistan Peoples Party	Kulsoom Akhtar Chandio
Reserved for Women	Pakistan Peoples Party	Parveen Bashir Qaimkhani
Reserved for Women	Pakistan Tehreek-e-Insaf	Sidra Imran
Reserved for Women	Pakistan Tehreek-e-Insaf	Seema Zia
Reserved for Women	Pakistan Tehreek-e-Insaf	Rabia Azfar Nizami
Reserved for Women	Pakistan Tehreek-e-Insaf	Dua Bhutto
Reserved for Women	Pakistan Tehreek-e-Insaf	Adeeba Hassan
Reserved for Women	Muttahida Qaumi Movement	Mangla Sharma
Reserved for Women	Muttahida Qaumi Movement	Rana Ansar
Reserved for Women	Muttahida Qaumi Movement	Shahana Ashar
Reserved for Women	Muttahida Qaumi Movement	Rabia Khatoon
Reserved for Women	Grand Democratic Alliance	Nusrat Seher Abbasi
Reserved for Women	Grand Democratic Alliance	Naseem Rajpar
Reserved for Women	Tehreek-i-Labbaik Pakistan	Sarwat Fatima
Reserved for Non-Muslims	Pakistan Peoples Party	Rana Hamir Singh
Reserved for Non-Muslims	Pakistan Peoples Party	Mukesh Kumar Chawla
Reserved for Non-Muslims	Pakistan Peoples Party	Lal Chand Ukrani
Reserved for Non-Muslims	Pakistan Peoples Party	Anthony Naveed
Reserved for Non-Muslims	Pakistan Peoples Party	Surendar Valasai
Reserved for Non-Muslims	Pakistan Tehreek-e-Insaf	Sanjay Gangwani
Reserved for Non-Muslims	Pakistan Tehreek-e-Insaf	Sachanand
Reserved for Non-Muslims	Muttahida Qaumi Movement	Sanjay Perwani
Reserved for Non-Muslims	Grand Democratic Alliance	Nand Kumar
