= PS-115 Karachi Keamari-V =

Constituency of the Provincial Assembly of Sindh, Pakistan

- Constituency for the Provincial Assembly of Sindh
- Region: Keamari Town (partly) including Karachi Port and Manora Cantonment of Keamari District in Karachi
- Electorate: 172,674

Current constituency
- Member: Vacant
- Created from: PS-89 Karachi-I (2002-2018); PS-113 Karachi West-II (2018-2023)

PS-115 Karachi Keamari-V (پی ایس-115، کراچی کیماڑی-5) is a constituency of the Provincial Assembly of Sindh.

== General elections 2024 ==
Provincial election 2024: PS-115 Karachi Keamari-V
Party	Candidate	Votes	%	±%
PPP	Muhammad Asif Khan	20,310	30.50	
Independent	Shah Nawaz Jadoon (Note: Filed nomination papers as PTI candidate but ECP allowed him to run as an Independent)	19,544	29.35	
PML(N)	Muhammad Saleem	7,233	10.86	
TLP	Muhammad Anwar UI Islam	6,119	9.19	
JI	Muhammad Tayyab Khan	4,762	7.15	
GDA	Sajjad Hussain	1,997	3.00	
PRHP	Ali Raza	1,744	2.62	
MQM-P	Ahmed Bilal	1,483	2.23	
Independent	Sohail Asad Knan	673	1.01	
Others	Others (nineteen candidates)	2,723	5.10	
Turnout		68,153	39.47	
Total valid votes		66,588	97.70	
Rejected ballots		1,565	2.30	
Majority		766	1.15	
Registered electors		172,674		
PPP gain from PTI				

== General elections 2018 ==
Provincial election 2018: PS-113 Karachi West-II
Party	Candidate	Votes	%	±%
PTI	Shah Nawaz Jadoon	18,691	29.60	
PPP	Humayun Muhammad Khan	14,967	23.70	
TLP	Sultan Ahmed	8,911	14.11	
ANP	Sarfaraz Khan Jadoon	6,792	10.76	
PML(N)	Mohibullah Khan	3,911	6.19	
MMA	Sajjad Ahmed Khan	3,028	4.80	
Independent	Bachu	2,589	4.10	
PRHP	Taj Muhammad Hanfi	2,344	3.71	
Independent	Shaikh Muhammad Kalam	830	1.31	
PSP	Ali Muhammad	423	0.67	
MQM-P	Mangla Sharma	224	0.35	
PML-SB	Muzaffar Ahmed	153	0.24	
PST	Muhammad Asif	106	0.17	
Independent	Muhammad Jameel Khan	53	0.08	
Independent	Ghulam Haider Khan	47	0.07	
Pasban-e-Pakistan	Ali Khan	32	0.05	
Independent	Niaz Muhammad Khan	30	0.05	
Independent	Muhammad Ayub Khan	15	0.02	
Majority		3,724	5.90	
Valid ballots		63,146		
Rejected ballots		1,617		
Turnout		64,763		
Registered electors		147,904		
hold				

== General elections 2013 ==
Contesting candidates	Party affiliation	Votes polled

== General elections 2008 ==
Contesting candidates	Party affiliation	Votes polled

== See also ==
- PS-114 Karachi Keamari-IV
- PS-116 Karachi West-I
