= PS-120 Karachi West-V =

Constituency of the Provincial Assembly of Sindh, Pakistan

- Constituency for the Provincial Assembly of Sindh
- Region: Mominabad Town (partly) of Karachi West District in Karachi
- Electorate: 237,701

Current constituency
- Member: Vacant
- Created from: PS-97 Karachi-IX (2002-2018); PS-118 Karachi West-VII (2018-2023)

PS-120 Karachi West-V (پی ایس-120، کراچی غربی-5) is a constituency of the Provincial Assembly of Sindh.

== General elections 2024 ==
Provincial election 2024: PS-120 Karachi West-V
Party	Candidate	Votes	%	±%
MQM-P	Mazahir Amir Khan	35,789	34.80	
Independent	Syed Shafiq (Note: Filed nomination papers as PTI candidate but ECP allowed him to run as an Independent)	21,097	20.52	
JI	Nazar Muhammad	13,240	12.88	
TLP	Hameed Ullah Khan	6,573	6.39	
PPP	M Kifayatullah	6,025	5.86	
ANP	Abdul Kabir	3,745	3.64	
PML(N)	Mumtaz Khan Tanoli	2,509	2.44	
Independent	Muhammad Arif	2,455	2.39	
Independent	Muhammad Dawood	1,023	1.00	
PRHP	Abdul Hameed	927	0.90	
PMML	Imdad Ali	852	0.83	
Independent	Muhammad Mustafa	841	0.82	
Independent	Muhammad Aslam Kk	740	0.72	
Others	Others (fourteen candidates)	7,016	6.81	
Turnout		104,265	43.86	
Total valid votes		102,832	98.63	
Rejected ballots		1,433	1.37	
Majority		14,692	14.28	
Registered electors		237,701		
MQM-P hold				

== General elections 2018 ==
Provincial election 2018: PS-118 Karachi West-VII
Party	Candidate	Votes	%	±%
MQM-P	Adeel Shahzad	18,491	28.71	
PTI	Malik Muhammad Arif Awan	12,938	20.09	
TLP	Nazir Ahmed	7,742	12.02	
MMA	Hyder Shah	6,938	10.77	
PML(N)	Amanullah khan	6,309	9.80	
ANP	Abdul Kabir	4,034	6.26	
PPP	Shahida Rehmani	3,026	4.70	
PSP	Naseem Khan	2,097	3.26	
AAT	Imdad Ali	1,014	1.57	
APML	Owais Ali Khan	475	0.74	
PRHP	Muhammad Ahmed Siddiqui	392	0.61	
Independent	Muhammad Waqar Akram	352	0.55	
Independent	Jahanzaib Hussain	119	0.18	
Independent	Syed Rais Ahmed Kazmi	110	0.17	
GDA	Abrar Ahmed Siddiqui	109	0.17	
MQM-H	Irshad Qureshi	59	0.09	
PMAP	Haji Muhammad Barki	59	0.09	
Independent	Abdul Rasheed	50	0.08	
Independent	Mumtaz Khan Tanoli	38	0.06	
Independent	Farida Abrar	22	0.03	
Independent	Rana Waqas Talib	13	0.02	
Independent	Ali Afsar Tanoli	12	0.02	
Majority		5,533	8.62	
Valid ballots		64,399		
Rejected ballots		1,282		
Turnout		65,681		
Registered electors		179,649		
hold				

== See also ==
- PS-119 Karachi West-IV
- PS-121 Karachi West-VI
