= PS-93 Karachi Korangi-IV =

Constituency of the Provincial Assembly of Sindh, Pakistan

- Constituency for the Provincial Assembly of Sindh
- Region: Korangi Town (partly) of Korangi District in Karachi

Current constituency
- Seats: 1
- Party: Vacant
- Member: Vacant
- Created from: PS-123 Karachi-XXXV (2002–2018); PS-95 Karachi Korangi-IV (2018–2023)

PS-93 Karachi Korangi-IV (پی ایس-93، کراچی کورنگی-4) is a constituency of the Provincial Assembly of Sindh.

== General elections 2024 ==
Provincial election 2024: PS-93 Karachi Korangi-IV
Party	Candidate	Votes	%	±%
Independent	Sajid Hussain Mir (Note: Filed nomination papers as PTI candidate but ECP allowed him to run as an Independent)	20,372	32.88	
JI	Abdul Hafeez	10,832	17.48	
PPP	Javed Shaikh	8,920	14.40	
MQM-P	Yasir Uddin	7,669	12.38	
TLP	Waqas Ali	6,180	9.98	
Independent	Waleed Farough	1,828	2.95	
PRHP	Younus	1,286	2.08	
PML(N)	Muhammad Shams Ur Rehman	1,052	1.70	
Independent	Shafiq Ahmed	860	1.39	
Others	Others (nineteen candidates)	2,956	4.76	
Turnout		63,034	33.27	
Total valid votes		61,955	98.29	
Rejected ballots		1,079	1.71	
Majority		9,540	15.40	
Registered electors		189,461		
PTI gain from MQM-P				

== General elections 2018 ==
Provincial election 2018: PS-95 Karachi Korangi-IV
Party	Candidate	Votes	%	±%
MQM-P	Muhammad Jawed Hanif Khan	21,524	36.39	
TLP	Muhammad Mehboob Ur Rehman	11,643	19.68	
PTI	Sajid Hussain	7,670	12.97	
MMA	Muhammad Ayub Abbasi	4,047	6.84	
Independent	Bachu	3,489	5.90	
PML(N)	Raiz Ahmed	3,161	5.34	
PPP	Azam Khan	2,346	3.97	
PSP	Sheraz Waheed	2,050	3.47	
MQM-H	Muhammad Tanveer Qurashi	1,157	1.96	
APML	Syed Muhammad Kamran	567	0.96	
PST	Muhammad Tariq	382	0.65	
PMA	Muhammad Islam	377	0.64	
GDA	Muhammad Suhaleheen Qurashi	271	0.46	
PML-SB	Abdul Haq	191	0.32	
Pasban-e-Pakistan	Muhammad Tayyab	115	0.19	
Independent	Abdul Hafeez	91	0.15	
Independent	Syed Adnan Ul Hassan Gilani	71	0.12	
Majority		9,881	16.71	
Valid ballots		59,152		
Rejected ballots		1,287		
Turnout		60,439		
Registered electors		166,211		
hold				

== General elections 2013 ==
Contesting candidates	Party affiliation	Votes polled

== General elections 2008 ==
Contesting candidates	Party affiliation	Votes polled

== See also ==
- PS-92 Karachi Korangi-III
- PS-94 Karachi Korangi-V
