= PS-119 Karachi West-IV =

Constituency of the Provincial Assembly of Sindh, Pakistan

- Constituency for the Provincial Assembly of Sindh
- Region: Orangi Town (partly) and Mominabad town (partly) of Karachi West District in Karachi
- Electorate: 247,362

Current constituency
- Member: Vacant
- Created from: PS-96 Karachi-VIII (2002-2018); PS-120 Karachi West-IX (2018-2023)

PS-119 Karachi West-IV (پی ایس-119، کراچی غربی-4 ) is a constituency of the Provincial Assembly of Sindh.

== General elections 2024 ==
Provincial election 2024: PS-119 Karachi West-IV
Party	Candidate	Votes	%	±%
MQM-P	Ali Khursheedi	22,424	27.14	
Independent	Saeed Ahmad Afridi (Note: Filed nomination papers as PTI candidate but ECP allowed him to run as an Independent)	16,812	20.35	
JI	Abdul Hannan Khan	12,209	14.77	
Independent	Akram Pervez	7,480	9.05	
TLP	Tahir Iqbal	6,294	7.62	
ANP	Anwar Zaib	3,568	4.32	
PPP	Shahida Rehmani	3,567	4.32	
Independent	Muhammad Arif	3,375	4.08	
PML(N)	Syed Muhammad Jamil	1,242	1.50	
PRHP	Muhammad Adil	1,195	1.45	
Independent	Muhammad Ameer Hamza	800	0.97	
Independent	Imran Aziz	760	0.92	
Independent	Abdul Jalil Knan	528	0.64	
Independent	Rooh UI Ameen	440	0.53	
Others	Others (fourteen candidates)	1,942	2.34	
Turnout		84,428	34.13	
Total valid votes		82,636	97.88	
Rejected ballots		1,792	2.12	
Majority		5,612	6.79	
Registered electors		247,362		
MQM-P gain from PTI				

== General elections 2018 ==
Provincial election 2018: PS-120 Karachi West-IX
Party	Candidate	Votes	%	±%
PTI	Saeed Ahmad Afridi	14,561	23.06	
MQM-P	Ahmed Nadeem Mughal	12,110	19.18	
MMA	Abdul Razzaq	10,087	15.97	
ANP	Amir Nawab	5,404	8.56	
PPP	Naseeb Ur rehman	3,770	5.97	
TLP	Arshad	3,688	5.84	
Independent	Siddique Akbar	3,565	5.65	
PRHP	Abdul Hameed	3,553	5.63	
PML(N)	Najeeb Ullah Khan Anjum	2,891	4.58	
PSP	Naseer Ud Din	1,951	3.09	
Independent	Yahya Khan	453	0.72	
AAT	Sher Bahadar Khan	221	0.35	
PMAP	Mehmood Khan	209	0.33	
GDA	Rujhan Ullah	134	0.21	
Independent	Muhammad Shoaib	117	0.19	
Independent	Yousaf Zada	114	0.18	
Independent	Abdul Malang Khan	92	0.15	
Independent	Parveen Usman	79	0.13	
Independent	Anwar Zaib	63	0.10	
Independent	Arshad Khan	49	0.08	
Independent	Arshad Sohail	20	0.03	
Independent	Bashir Ahmed	19	0.03	
Majority		2,451	3.88	
Valid ballots		63,150		
Rejected ballots		1,847		
Turnout		64,997		
Registered electors		176,048		
hold				

== General elections 2013 ==
Contesting candidates	Party affiliation	Votes polled

== General elections 2008 ==
Contesting candidates	Party affiliation	Votes polled

== See also ==
- PS-118 Karachi West-III
- PS-120 Karachi West-V
