= PS-63 Hyderabad-IV =

Constituency of the Provincial Assembly of Sindh, Pakistan

- Constituency for the Provincial Assembly of Sindh
- Region: Latifabad township of Hyderabad city in Hyderabad District
- Electorate: 239,767

Current constituency
- Member: Vacant
- Created from: PS-48 Hyderabad-VI (2002–2018); PS-65 Hyderabad-IV (2018–2023)

PS-63 Hyderabad-IV (پی ایس-63، حیدرآباد-4) is a constituency of the Provincial Assembly of Sindh.

== General elections 2024 ==
Provincial election 2024: PS-63 Hyderabad-IV
Party	Candidate	Votes	%	±%
Independent	Rehan Rajpoot (Note: Filed nomination papers as PTI candidate but ECP allowed him to run as an Independent)	40,709	53.39	
MQM-P	Kamran Shafique	11,882	15.58	
PPP	Sanam Talpur	6,974	9.15	
JI	Afaq Nasar	3,656	4.80	
TLP	Zaman Ahmed Khan	2,514	3.30	
Independent	Imtiaz Ali Arain	2,198	2.88	
Independent	Abdul Majeed Bhatti	2,115	2.77	
Independent	Muhammad Rasheed Khan	1,328	1.74	
PML(N)	Mir Yasir Talpur	617	0.81	
Independent	Mujtaba Sami	538	0.71	
Others	Others (twenty nine candidates)	3,718	4.87	
Turnout		77,932	32.52	
Total valid votes		76,249	97.84	
Rejected ballots		1,683	2.16	
Majority		28,827	37.81	
Registered electors		239,677		
PTI gain from MQM-P				

== General elections 2018 ==
Provincial election 2018: PS-65 Hyderabad-IV
Party	Candidate	Votes	%	±%
MQM-P	Nadeem Ahmed Siddiqui	28,170	35.08	
PTI	Mustansar Billah	21,355	26.60	
PPP	Sanam Talpur	8,436	10.51	
PSP	Raheel Ahmed	7,685	9.57	
TLP	Muhammad Tahir	3,571	4.45	
MMA	Syed Nasir Ali	2,333	2.91	
PML(N)	Asifa	1,661	2.07	
Independent	Suleman	1,454	1.81	
AAT	Faisal Ahmed Khan	1,318	1.64	
Independent	Saghir Ahmed Sheikh	917	1.14	
APML	Jahanzaib Yousafzai	681	0.85	
GDA	Syed Ali Raza Shah	562	0.70	
Independent	Mohsin Ali Sheikh	479	0.60	
PRHP	Muhammad Asif	460	0.57	
Jamiat Ulema-e-Pakistan	Talat Mehmood	301	0.37	
MQM-H	Syed Sarwat Fareed Shah	219	0.27	
PST	Muhammad Ali Malik	216	0.27	
Independent	Kamran Ahmed Khan	159	0.20	
Independent	Aijaz	67	0.08	
Independent	Muhammad Farhan	65	0.08	
Independent	Habib Ur Rehman	44	0.05	
Independent	Syed Shahbaz Ali Abdi	40	0.05	
Independent	Muhammad Saleem	35	0.04	
Independent	Syed Farooq Mushtaq	34	0.04	
Independent	Mushtaq Ahmed	31	0.04	
Majority		6,815	8.48	
Valid ballots		80,293		
Rejected ballots		1,688		
Turnout		81,981		
Registered electors		213,915		
hold				

== General elections 2013 ==
Contesting candidates	Party affiliation	Votes polled

== General elections 2008 ==
Contesting candidates	Party affiliation	Votes polled

== See also ==
- PS-62 Hyderabad-III
- PS-64 Hyderabad-V
