= PS-116 Karachi West-I =

Constituency of the Provincial Assembly of Sindh, Pakistan

- Constituency for the Provincial Assembly of Sindh
- Region: Manghopir town (partly) of Karachi West District in Karachi
- Electorate: 43,045

Current constituency
- Member: Vacant
- Created from: PS-95 Karachi-VII (2002-2018); PS-122 Karachi West-XI (2018-2023)

PS-116 Karachi West-I (پی ایس-116، کراچی غربی-1) is a constituency of the Provincial Assembly of Sindh.

== General elections 2024 ==
Provincial election 2024: PS-116 Karachi West-I
Party	Candidate	Votes	%	±%
PPP	Ali Ahmed Jan	7,153	36.17	
MQM-P	Muhammad Raheel Khan	3,540	17.90	
JI	Muhammad Abul Zia Pervez	2,376	12.02	
PTI	Rabistan Khan (Note: Filed nomination papers as PTI candidate but ECP allowed him to run as independent)	2,170	10.97	
PML(N)	Imran	1,277	6.46	
TLP	Syed Bilal Hussain Shah	1,148	5.81	
Independent	Alif Zar	905	4.58	
PRHP	Muhammad Shafiq	422	2.13	
Others	Others (twenty seven candidates)	784	3.98	
Turnout		20,167	47.01	
Total valid votes		19,775	98.06	
Rejected ballots		392	1.94	
Majority		3,613	18.27	
Registered electors		42,903		
PPP gain from PTI				

== General elections 2018 ==
Provincial election 2018: PS-122 Karachi West-XI
Party	Candidate	Votes	%	±%
PTI	Rabistan Khan	6,244	21.04	
MQM-P	Mazahir Amir Khan	5,476	18.46	
MMA	Syed Muhammad Rizwan Shah	3,826	12.89	
TLP	Syed Bilal Hussain Shah	2,929	9.87	
PPP	Abdul Sattar	2,642	8.90	
PML(N)	Noor Hassan	2,384	8.03	
PSP	Abdul Habib	1,978	6.67	
JUI-S	Hafiz Ahmed Ali	828	2.79	
Independent	Aftab Bakhsh	473	1.59	
PML-SB	Zahid Ullah Khan	404	1.36	
Independent	Muhammad Farooq	392	1.32	
PMA	Muhammad Zahid Awan	330	1.11	
Tehrik Jawanan Pakistan	Haider Ali Kiyani	311	1.05	
Independent	Shahzad Ahmed	298	1.00	
Independent	Sohail Latif	241	0.81	
Independent	Muharam Ali	224	0.75	
Independent	Muhammad Azeem	212	0.71	
Independent	Shafiq Dad	196	0.66	
APML	Shazia Salman	182	0.61	
MQM-H	Haseena Amjad Ali	32	0.11	
Independent	Ghani Ul Fahad	25	0.08	
Independent	Farhat Hussain	16	0.05	
Independent	Faisal Ali Baloch	16	0.05	
Independent	Muhammad Iqbal Brohi	13	0.04	
Majority		768	2.58	
Valid ballots		29,672		
Rejected ballots		894		
Turnout		30,566		
Registered electors		79,213		
hold				

== General elections 2013 ==
Contesting candidates	Party affiliation	Votes polled

== General elections 2008 ==
Contesting candidates	Party affiliation	Votes polled

== See also ==
- PS-115 Karachi Keamari-V
- PS-117 Karachi West-II
