= PS-92 Karachi Korangi-III =

Constituency of the Provincial Assembly of Sindh, Pakistan

- Constituency for the Provincial Assembly of Sindh
- Region: Landhi Town (partly) of Korangi District in Karachi

Current constituency
- Seats: 1
- Party: Vacant
- Member: Vacant
- Created from: PS-122 Karachi-XXXIV (2002-2018); PS-94 Karachi Korangi-III (2018-2023)

PS-92 Karachi Korangi-III (پی ایس-92، کراچی کورنگی-3) is a constituency of the Provincial Assembly of Sindh.

== General elections 2024 ==
Provincial election 2024: PS-92 Karachi Korangi-III
Party	Candidate	Votes	%	±%
Independent	Wajid Hussain Khan (Note: Filed nomination papers as PTI candidate but ECP allowed him to run as an Independent)	28,309	31.76	
JI	Mirza Farhan Baig	20,860	23.40	
MQM-P	Arsalan Ahmed	10,805	12.12	
TLP	Muhammad Kashif	7,468	8.38	
MQM-H	Nighat Fatima	6,993	7.85	
Independent	Shagufta Rafiq	6,820	7.65	
PPP	Muhammad Rehan	3,316	3.72	
PRHP	Muhammad Furqan	1,067	1.20	
Others	Others (fourteen candidates)	3,550	3.92	
Turnout		90,365	32.86	
Total valid votes		89,134	98.64	
Rejected ballots		1,231	1.36	
Majority		7,449	8.36	
Registered electors		275,043		
PTI gain from MQM-P				

== General elections 2018 ==
Provincial election 2018: PS-94 Karachi Korangi-III
Party	Candidate	Votes	%	±%
MQM-P	Muhammad Wajahat	32,729	35.96	
TLP	Muhammad Shoaib Ur Rehman	14,030	15.42	
PTI	Fareedullah	13,640	14.99	
MQM-H	Arif Azam	10,828	11.90	
MMA	Muhammad Aslam Pervaiz Abbasi	7,614	8.37	
PSP	Muhammad Irfan	4,187	4.6	
PPP	Gul E Rana Azhar	2,458	2.70	
Independent	Hafiz Muhammad Kifayatullah	2,204	2.42	
PML(N)	Muhammad Rafique	1,645	1.81	
PST	Shamim Ahmed	788	0.87	
APML	Javed Iqbal	361	0.40	
GDA	Uzma Farooq	208	0.23	
Jamiat Ulema-e-Pakistan	Muhammad Ahmed	104	0.11	
Independent	Javed Ali Shaikh	69	0.08	
Independent	Naseem Ahmed Khan	69	0.08	
Independent	Mirza Farhan Baig	30	0.03	
Independent	Muhammad Saleem Khan	26	0.03	
Independent	Aurangzeb Khan	11	0.01	
Independent	Raees Ur Rehman Khan	9	0.01	
Majority		18,699	20.54	
Valid ballots		91,010		
Rejected ballots		1,686		
Turnout		92,696		
Registered electors		246,449		
hold				

== General elections 2013 ==
Contesting candidates	Party affiliation	Votes polled

== General elections 2008 ==
Contesting candidates	Party affiliation	Votes polled

== See also ==
- PS-91 Karachi Korangi-II
- PS-93 Karachi Korangi-IV
