= Ghulam Jellani =

Pakistani politician

Member of the Provincial Assembly of Sindh
- In office 13 August 2018 – 11 August 2023
- Constituency: PS-96 Korangi Karachi-V

Personal details
- Born: Karachi, Sindh, Pakistan
- Party: MQM-P (2018-present)

Ghulam Jellani is a Pakistani politician who had been a member of the Provincial Assembly of Sindh from August 2018 to August 2023.

== Political career ==
He was elected to the Provincial Assembly of Sindh as a candidate of Muttahida Qaumi Movement – Pakistan from PS-96 Korangi Karachi-V in the 2018 Sindh provincial election.
