= PS-58 Tando Allahyar-I =

Constituency of the Provincial Assembly of Sindh, Pakistan

- Constituency for the Provincial Assembly of Sindh
- Region: Tando Allahyar Tehsil (partly) and Jhando Mari Tehsil (partly) of Tando Allahyar District
- Electorate: 240,822

Current constituency
- Member: Vacant
- Created from: PS-51 Hyderabad-IX (2002–2018); PS-60 Tando Allahyar-I (2018–2023)

PS-58 Tando Allahyar-I (پی ایس-58، ٹنڈو اللہ یار-1) is a constituency of the Provincial Assembly of Sindh.

== General elections 2024 ==
Provincial election 2024: PS-58 Tando Allahyar-I
Party	Candidate	Votes	%	±%
PPP	Syed Zia Abbas Shah	57,606	50.97	
GDA	Rahila Magsi	42,587	37.68	
Independent	Rashid Hussain (Note: Filed nomination papers as PTI candidate but ECP allowed him to run as an Independent)	5,767	5.10	
TLP	Muhammad Umer Jan	2,098	1.86	
Independent	Jazeb Ali	1,229	1.09	
Others	Others (sixteen candidates)	3,723	3.30	
Turnout		116,744	48.47	
Total valid votes		113,010	96.80	
Rejected ballots		3,734	3.20	
Majority		15,019	13.29	
Registered electors		240,882		
PPP hold				

== General elections 2018 ==
Provincial election 2018: PS-60 Tando Allahyar-I
Party	Candidate	Votes	%	±%
PPP	Syed Zia Abbas Shah	51,325	51.52	
PTI	Ali Ahmed Palh	34,761	34.89	
TLP	Abdul Jabbar	3,506	3.52	
MMA	Mohammad Ashfaque	3,019	3.03	
Independent	Altaf Hussain	2,223	2.23	
Independent	Gul Hassan	1,879	1.89	
PSP	Shahbaz Ahmed Khan	446	0.45	
MQM-P	Kashif Naseeb	389	0.39	
Tabdeeli Pasand Party Pakistan	Sherimati Dero	386	0.39	
Independent	Syed Altaf Hussain Shah	323	0.32	
Independent	Pir Ghulam Nabi Shah	264	0.27	
PRHP	Kaleem Ullah Khan	244	0.24	
Independent	Sher Muhammad Mirjat Baloch	178	0.18	
Independent	Kishor Kumar	127	0.13	
Independent	Mehboob Ali	110	0.11	
SUP	Amir Ali Thebo	108	0.11	
Independent	Syed Ali Nawaz Shah Rizvi	106	0.11	
Independent	Memoona Khatoon	81	0.08	
Independent	Rashid Hussain	75	0.08	
Independent	Habibullah Palh	69	0.07	
Majority		16,564	16.63	
Valid ballots		99,619		
Rejected ballots		4,268		
Turnout		103,887		
Registered electors		201,430		
hold				

== General elections 2013 ==
Contesting candidates	Party affiliation	Votes polled

== General elections 2008 ==
Contesting candidates	Party affiliation	Votes polled

== See also ==
- PS-57 Matiari-II
- PS-59 Tando Allahyar-II
