= Dewan Sachanand =

Pakistani politician

Member of the Provincial Assembly of Sindh
- In office 13 August 2018 – 11 August 2023
- Constituency: Reserved seat for minorities

Personal details
- Born: Karachi, Sindh, Pakistan
- Party: AP (2024-present)
- Other political affiliations: PTI (2018-2023)

Dewan Sachanand (Urdu: دیوان سچانند), also known as Dewan Sachal Lakhwani, is a Pakistani politician who had been a member for the Provincial Assembly of Sindh from August 2018 to August 2023.

== Political career ==
He was elected to Provincial Assembly of Sindh on a reserved seat for minorities in the 2018 Sindh provincial election representing Pakistan Tehreek-e-Insaf (PTI).

On 8 August 2023, he was expelled from the PTI for violating party discipline when he voted for Rana Ansar, a member of the Muttahida Qaumi Movement – Pakistan (MQM-P), to become the Leader of the Opposition in the Provincial Assembly.

He joined Awaam Pakistan (AP) soon after the party's founding.
