= Adeel =

Adeel (Arabic: عديل) is a Muslim male name in South Asia.

== Given name ==
- Adeel Ahmed (footballer) (born 1983), Pakistani footballer
- Adeel Ahmed, Pakistani politician
- Adeel Akhtar (born 1980), English actor
- Adeel Chaudhry (born 1988), Pakistani-Canadian singer-songwriter and actor
- Adeel Hussain (born 1978), Pakistani actor and director
- Adeel Malik (born 1985), Pakistani cricketer
- Adeel Raja (born 1980), Dutch cricketer
- Adeel Razzaq, Pakistani writer
- Adeel Shahzad, Pakistani politician
- Adeel Alam (born 1986), American professional wrestler known by his ring name Ali

== Surname ==
- Haji Muhammad Adeel, Pakistani politician
