= Nadeem Ahmed Siddiqui =

Pakistani politician

Member of the Provincial Assembly of Sindh
- In office 13 August 2018 – 11 August 2023
- Constituency: PS-65 Hyderabad-IV

Personal details
- Born: Hyderabad, Sindh, Pakistan
- Party: MQM-P (2018-present)

Nadeem Siddiqui is a Pakistani politician, who had been a member of the Provincial Assembly of Sindh from August 2018 till August 2023. He served as CPLC deputy chief Hyderabad. He was also vice president of the chamber of commerce and chairman of the Hyderabad law and order committee.

== Political career ==
He was elected to the Provincial Assembly of Sindh as a candidate of Muttahida Qaumi Movement from Constituency PS-65 (Hyderabad-IV) in the 2018 Pakistani general election.
