= Muhammad Asif Khan (Pakistani politician) =

Pakistani politician

Muhammad Asif Khan is a Pakistani politician who has been a Member of the Provincial Assembly of Sindh since 2024.

== Political career ==
He was elected to the 16th Provincial Assembly of Sindh as a candidate of the Pakistan People's Party from constituency PS-115 Karachi Keamari-V in the 2024 Pakistani general election.
