= Imdad Ali Pitafi =

Pakistani politician

Member of the Provincial Assembly of Sindh
- In office 13 August 2018 – 11 August 2023
- Constituency: PS-61 Tando Allahyar-II
- In office 29 May 2013 – 28 May 2018

Personal details
- Born: 1 January 1973 (age 53) Tando Allahyar, Sindh, Pakistan
- Party: PPP (2013-present)

Imdad Ali Pitafi is a Pakistani politician who had been a member of the Provincial Assembly of Sindh from August 2018 to August 2023 and from May 2013 to May 2018.

== Early life and education ==
He was born on 1 January 1973 in Tando Allahyar.

He has a degree of Bachelors of Arts from Sindh University.

== Political career ==
He ran for the seat of the Provincial Assembly of Sindh as a candidate of Pakistan Peoples Party (PPP) from Constituency PS-52 (Hyderabad-X) in the 2002 Pakistani general election but was unsuccessful.

He was elected to the Provincial Assembly of Sindh as a candidate of PPP from Constituency PS-52 (TANDO ALLAYAR-II) in the 2008 Pakistani general election.

He was elected to the Provincial Assembly of Sindh as a candidate of PPP from Constituency PS-52 (TANDO ALLAYAR-Il) in the 2013 Pakistani general election. In August 2016, he was into Sindh's provincial cabinet of Chief Minister Syed Murad Ali Shah and was made Provincial Minister of Sindh for Works and Services.

He was re-elected to Provincial Assembly of Sindh as a candidate of PPP from Constituency PS-61 (Tando Allahyar-II) in the 2018 Pakistani general election.
