= PS-62 Hyderabad-III =

Constituency of the Provincial Assembly of Sindh, Pakistan

- Constituency for the Provincial Assembly of Sindh
- Region: Latifabad Tehsil (partly) and Hyderabad Tehsil (partly) of Hyderabad District
- Electorate: 178,972

Current constituency
- Member: Vacant
- Created from: PS-49 Hyderabad-VI (2002-2018); PS-64 Hyderabad-III (2018-2023)

PS-62 Hyderabad-III (پی ایس-62، حیدرآباد-3) is a constituency of the Provincial Assembly of Sindh.

== General elections 2024 ==
Provincial election 2024: PS-62 Hyderabad-III
Party	Candidate	Votes	%	±%
MQM-P	Sabir Hussain Qaimkhani	24,385	36.07	
PPP	Abdul Jabbar	18,209	26.93	
PTI	Awais Khan (Note: Filed nomination papers as PTI candidate but ECP allowed him to run as an independent)	14,287	21.13	
TLP	Muhammad Naveed	3,052	4.51	
JI	Saif Ur Rehman	1,878	2.78	
Independent	Amir Hussain	1,238	1.83	
JUI (F)	Faiz Ullah	1,002	1.48	
Independent	Anwar Mughal	709	1.05	
Others	Others (twenty candidates)	2,845	4.27	
Turnout		69,724	38.96	
Total valid votes		67,605	96.96	
Rejected ballots		2,119	3.04	
Majority		6,176	9.14	
Registered electors		178,973		
MQM-P gain from PPP				

== General elections 2018 ==
Provincial election 2018: PS-64 Hyderabad-III
Party	Candidate	Votes	%	±%
PPP	Abdul Jabbar	21,896	31.14	
MQM-P	Muhammad Younus	18,292	26.01	
PTI	Ghulam Rasool	10,457	14.87	
TLP	Rashid Ali	7,902	11.24	
PSP	Muhammad Aijaz Shaikh	2,746	3.91	
MMA	Saif ur Rehman	2,385	3.39	
PML(N)	Ahmed Hyder	1,266	1.80	
AAT	Waliullah Panhwar	1,052	1.50	
PST	Ghulam Rasool Meo	838	1.19	
Independent	Amarshi	594	0.84	
Independent	Imdad Hussain	572	0.81	
SUP	Gul Hassan Mirbehar	455	0.65	
Independent	Irfan Muhammad Khan	416	0.59	
Independent	Syed Raza Ul Hassan	316	0.45	
Independent	Anwar Ahmad	289	0.41	
APML	Shakeel ur Rehman	287	0.41	
Independent	Syed Azhar Ali Shah	128	0.18	
Independent	Muhammad Zubair Malik	128	0.18	
Independent	Shafiq Ahmed	97	0.14	
Independent	Ashraf Ali	64	0.09	
Independent	Syed Mazhar Kamal	59	0.08	
Independent	Rasheed Ahmed Khan	57	0.08	
Independent	Arsalan Hyder Bhatti	18	0.03	
Majority		3,604	5.13	
Valid ballots		70,943		
Rejected ballots		1,711		
Turnout		72,654		
Registered electors		170,540		
hold				

== General elections 2013 ==
Contesting candidates	Party affiliation	Votes polled

== General elections 2008 ==
Contesting candidates	Party affiliation	Votes polled

== See also ==
- PS-61 Hyderabad-II
- PS-63 Hyderabad-IV
