= PS-91 Karachi Korangi-II =

Constituency of the Provincial Assembly of Sindh, Pakistan

- Constituency for the Provincial Assembly of Sindh
- Region: Shah Faisal Town (partly) of Korangi District in Karachi

Current constituency
- Party: Jamaat-e-Islami Pakistan
- Member: Muhammad Farooq
- Created from: PS-120 Karachi-XXXII (2002-2018); PS-93 Karachi Korangi-II (2018-2023)

PS-91 Karachi Korangi-II (پی ایس-91، کراچی کورنگی-2) is a constituency of the Provincial Assembly of Sindh.

== General elections 2024 ==
Provincial election 2024: PS-91 Karachi Korangi-II
Party	Candidate	Votes	%	±%
JI	Muhammad Farooq	23,499	31.17	
Independent	Abid Jilani	22,732	30.15	
Independent	Rehan Ahmed	6,194	8.22	
MQM-P	Mohammad Abubakar	5,708	7.57	
PTI	Syed Hammad Hussain (Note: Filed nomination papers as PTI candidate but ECP allowed him to run as an Independent)	5,024	6.66	
PML(N)	Nasir Uddin Mahmood	3,702	4.91	
TLP	Muhammad Aftab Khan	3,138	4.16	
PPP	Rehman Waheed Bajwa	1,836	2.44	
Others	Others (twenty three candidates)	3,560	4.72	
Turnout		76,299	37.33	
Total valid votes		75,393	98.81	
Rejected ballots		906	1.19	
Majority		767	1.02	
Registered electors		204,420		
JI gain from MQM-P				

== General elections 2018 ==
Provincial election 2018: PS-93 Karachi Korangi-II
Party	Candidate	Votes	%	±%
MQM-P	Hamid Ul Zafar	32,570	33.41	
PTI	Waqas Iqbal	21,939	22.50	
TLP	Rana Sajid Mehmood	18,731	19.21	
MMA	Taufeequddin Siddiqui	8,159	8.37	
PPP	Sajjad Haider	4,726	4.85	
PSP	Ashfaq Mangi	3,400	3.49	
PML(N)	Muhammad Akbar Awan	2,716	2.79	
Independent	Sanaullah Qureshi	996	1.02	
Independent	Nadeem	951	0.98	
MQM-H	Shahnawaz	891	0.91	
Independent	Shahzad Ur Rehman	675	0.69	
Independent	Muhammad Noman	568	0.58	
GDA	Almas Azam	411	0.42	
Independent	Karim Bux	349	0.36	
Independent	Syed Adnan Ali	134	0.14	
PST	Syed Muhammad Naseem Shah	98	0.1	
Independent	Muhammad Jahanzed Khan	94	0.1	
Independent	Syed Zahid Zafar Ahmed Rizvi	49	0.05	
Pakistan Falah Party	Shakeel Uddin Siddiqui	35	0.04	
Majority		10,631	10.91	
Valid ballots		97,492		
Rejected ballots		1,575		
Turnout		99,067		
Registered electors		224,227		
hold				

== General elections 2013 ==
Contesting candidates	Party affiliation	Votes polled

== General elections 2008 ==
Contesting candidates	Party affiliation	Votes polled

== See also ==
- PS-90 Karachi Korangi-I
- PS-92 Karachi Korangi-III
