= Abdul Bari Pitafi =

Pakistani politician

Provincial Minister for Livestock and Fisheries
- In office 15 October 2018 – 11 August 2023

Provincial Minister for Co-operation
- In office 2018 – 11 August 2023

Member of the Provincial Assembly of Sindh
- In office 13 August 2018 – 11 August 2023
- Constituency: PS-19 Ghotki-II

Personal details
- Party: TLP (2025-present)
- Other political affiliations: PPP (2018-2025)

Abdul Bari Pitafi is a Pakistani politician who had been a member of the Provincial Assembly of Sindh from August 2018 till August 2023.

== Political career ==
He was elected to the Provincial Assembly of Sindh as a candidate of Pakistan Peoples Party from PS-19 Ghotki-II in the 2018 Sindh provincial election.

On 15 October 2018, he was inducted into the provincial Sindh cabinet of Chief Minister Syed Murad Ali Shah and was appointed as Provincial Minister of Sindh for Livestock and Fisheries with the additional ministerial portfolio of Cooperation.
