= Wajid Hussain Khan =

Pakistani politician

Wajid Hussain Khan is a Pakistani politician who has been a Member of the Provincial Assembly of Sindh since 2024.

== Political career ==
He was elected to the 16th Provincial Assembly of Sindh as Pakistan Tehreek-e-Insaf-backed independent candidate from Constituency PS-92 Karachi Korangi-III in the 2024 Pakistani general election.
