= Abdul Jabbar Khan (Sindh politician) =

Member of the Provincial Assembly of Sindh
- In office 13 August 2018 – 11 August 2023
- Constituency: PS-64 Hyderabad-III

Personal details
- Party: Pakistan Peoples Party

Abdul Jabbar Khan is a Pakistani Politician who had been elected as Nazim of Taluka Latifabad in 2002. He was appointed as Advisor to the Chief Minister of Sindh for Cooperative Department. He had been a member of the Provincial Assembly of Sindh from August 2018 till August 2023.

== Political career ==
He was elected to the Nazim of Taluka Latifabad in 2002.

He was participated in general election of 2008 and appointed as advisor to CM Sindh and Minister for Cooperative Department.

He was again participated in General Election 2013 from PS-49 Hyderabad but unsuccessful.

In 2018 he was elected member of Provincial Assembly of Sindh on Pakistan Peoples Party Platform from Constituency PS-64 (Hyderabad-III) in the 2018 Pakistani general election.
