= Hizbullah Bughio =

Pakistani politician

Member of the Provincial Assembly of Sindh
- In office 13 August 2018 – 11 August 2023
- Constituency: PS-13 Larkana-IV

Personal details
- Party: Pakistan Peoples Party

Hizbullah Bughio is a Pakistani politician who had been a member of the Provincial Assembly of Sindh from August 2018 to August 2023.

== Political career ==
He was elected to the Provincial Assembly of Sindh as a candidate of the Pakistan Peoples Party from PS-13 Larkana-IV in the 2018 Sindh provincial election.
