= PS-94 Karachi Korangi-V =

Constituency of the Provincial Assembly of Sindh, Pakistan

- Constituency for the Provincial Assembly of Sindh
- Region: Korangi Town (partly) and Landhi Town (partly) of Korangi District in Karachi

Current constituency
- Seats: 1
- Party: Vacant
- Member: Vacant
- Created from: PS-125 Karachi-XXXVII (2002-2018); PS-96 Karachi Korangi-V (2018-2023)

PS-94 Karachi Korangi-V (پی ایس-94، کراچی کورنگی-5) is a constituency of the Provincial Assembly of Sindh.

== General elections 2024 ==
Provincial election 2024: PS-94 Karachi Korangi-V
Party	Candidate	Votes	%	±%
MQM-P	Najam Mirza	23,285	28.26	
JI	Arshad Hussain	18,884	22.92	
PTI	Abdul Qadeer (Note: Filed nomination papers as PTI candidate but ECP allowed him to run as an Independent)	18,024	21.87	
TLP	Muhammad Qasim	9,957	12.08	
PPP	lmran Ahmed Siddiqui	4,078	4.95	
Independent	Mirza Riaz Hussain	1,772	2.15	
Independent	Syed Mehmood Ali	1,649	2.00	
PML(N)	Abdul Imran	1,228	1.49	
PRHP	Sheraz Hussain Shaikh	821	1.00	
Others	Others (fifteen candidates)	2,710	3.28	
Turnout		83,175	33.18	
Total valid votes		82,408	99.08	
Rejected ballots		767	0.92	
Majority		4,401	5.34	
Registered electors		250,716		
MQM-P hold				

== General elections 2018 ==
Provincial election 2018: PS-96 Karachi Korangi-V
Party	Candidate	Votes	%	±%
MQM-P	Ghulam Jilani	19,864	29.09	
TLP	Muhammad Abu Bakar	18,962	27.77	
PTI	Sajid Hussain	12,087	17.70	
MMA	Rajab Ali Chishti	6,109	8.95	
PSP	Syed Faizan Yasir	4,583	6.71	
PPP	Asad Mujahid	3,326	4.87	
Independent	Muhammad Rafiq Meo	968	1.42	
Independent	Yaseen Jawed	715	1.05	
Independent	Syed Mehmood Ali	555	0.81	
MQM-H	Sheikh Muhammad Saleem	487	0.71	
Independent	Muhammad Ali	419	0.61	
Independent	Muhammad Kamran Khan	70	0.10	
Independent	Muhammad Asim Qasim	65	0.1	
Independent	Abdul Waheed Abbasi	38	0.06	
Independent	Muhammad Wajahat	32	0.05	
Majority		902	1.32	
Valid ballots		68,280		
Rejected ballots		1,404		
Turnout		69,684		
Registered electors		182,239		
hold				

== General elections 2013 ==
Contesting candidates	Party affiliation	Votes polled

== General elections 2008 ==
Contesting candidates	Party affiliation	Votes polled

== See also ==
- PS-93 Karachi Korangi-IV
- PS-95 Karachi Korangi-VI
