= Ali Ahmed Jan =

Pakistani politician

Ali Ahmed Jan is a Pakistani politician who has been a Member of the Provincial Assembly of Sindh since 2024.

== Political career ==
He was elected to the 16th Provincial Assembly of Sindh as a candidate of the Pakistan People's Party from Constituency PS-116 Karachi West-I in the 2024 Pakistani general election.
