= PS-38 Shaheed Benazirabad-III =

Constituency of the Provincial Assembly of Sindh, Pakistan

- Constituency for the Provincial Assembly of Sindh
- Region: Sakrand Taluka of Shaheed Benazirabad District
- Electorate: 219,981

Current constituency
- Member: Vacant
- Created from: PS-27 Nawabshah-IV (2002-2018); PS-39 Nawabshah-III (2018-2023)

PS-38 Shaheed Benazirabad-III (پی ایس-۳۸، شہید بینظیر آباد-۳) is a constituency of the Provincial Assembly of Sindh.

== General elections 2024 ==
Provincial election 2024: PS-38 Shaheed Benazirabad-III
| Party | Candidate | Votes | % | ±% |
|---|---|---|---|---|
| PPP | Ghulam Qadir Chandio | 66,176 | 57.48 | |
| GDA | Syed Zainulabdin | 40,488 | 35.17 | |
| Independent | Arif Niaz Arain | 3,110 | 2.70 | |
| Others | Others (sixteen candidates) | 5,362 | 4.65 | |
| Turnout | | 122,451 | 55.66 | |
| Total valid votes | | 115,136 | 94.03 | |
| Rejected ballots | | 7,315 | 5.97 | |
| Majority | | 25,688 | 22.31 | |
| Registered electors | | 219,981 | | |
| PPP hold | | | | |

== General elections 2018 ==
Provincial election 2018: PS-39 Shaheed Benazirabad-III
| Party | Candidate | Votes | % | ±% |
|---|---|---|---|---|
| PPP | Ghulam Qadir Chandio | 58,159 | 58.42 | |
| SUP | Syed Zain Ul Abdin | 33,561 | 33.71 | |
| Independent | Syed Anwar Ali Shah | 2,888 | 2.90 | |
| Independent | Asadullah Unar | 2,377 | 2.39 | |
| Independent | Ibrahim | 399 | 0.40 | |
| Independent | Ghulam Hussain Chandio | 368 | 0.37 | |
| AAT | Nasiruddin | 323 | 0.32 | |
| PTI | Ghulam Rasool Khan Unar | 297 | 0.30 | |
| Independent | Ghulam Ali Chandio | 295 | 0.30 | |
| Independent | Liaqat Ali | 256 | 0.26 | |
| Independent | Afshan Iqbal | 245 | 0.25 | |
| PPP(SB) | Muhammad Laique Lakho | 162 | 0.16 | |
| Independent | Arbab Ali | 109 | 0.11 | |
| Independent | Abdul Qadir | 83 | 0.08 | |
| Independent | Ghulam Irtaza Unar | 23 | 0.02 | |
| Majority | | 24,598 | 24.71 | |
| Valid ballots | | 99,545 | | |
| Rejected ballots | | 5,087 | | |
| Turnout | | 104,632 | | |
| Registered electors | | 175,010 | | |
| hold | | | | |

== See also ==
- PS-37 Nawabshah-II
- PS-39 Nawabshah-IV
