= Muhammad Shabbir Qureshi =

Pakistani politician

Member of the Provincial Assembly of Sindh
- Incumbent
- Assumed office 25 February 2024
- Constituency: PS-114 Karachi Keamari-IV

Member of the Provincial Assembly of Sindh
- In office 13 August 2018 – 11 August 2023
- Constituency: PS-114 (Karachi West-III)

Personal details
- Born: Karachi, Sindh, Pakistan
- Party: PTI (2018-present)

Muhammad Shabbir Qureshi is a Pakistani politician who had been a member of the Provincial Assembly of Sindh from August 2018 to August 2023. He was elected for the second term in February 2024.

== Political career ==
He was elected to the Provincial Assembly of Sindh as a candidate of Pakistan Tehreek-e-Insaf from Constituency PS-114 (Karachi West-III) in the 2018 Pakistani general election. He was elected to the 16th Provincial Assembly of Sindh as Pakistan Tehreek-e-Insaf-backed independent candidate from Constituency PS-114 Karachi Keamari-IV for the second term in the 2024 Pakistani general election.
