= Syed Hashim Raza Jilani =

Pakistani politician from Karachi

Syed Hashim Raza Jillani

Member of the Provincial Assembly of Sindh
- In office 7 February 2019 – 11 August 2023
- Constituency: PS-94 Korangi Karachi-III

Personal details
- Born: 23 June 1990 (age 35) Karachi, Sindh, Pakistan
- Party: MQM-P (2019-present)

Syed Hashim Raza Jillani is a Pakistani politician who had been a member of the Provincial Assembly of Sindh from February 2019 to August 2023.

== Political career ==
Syed Hashim Raza Jillani contested by-election on 27 January 2019 from PS-94 Korangi Karachi-III of Provincial Assembly of Sindh on the ticket of Muttahida Qaumi Movement – Pakistan. He won the election by the majority of 12,559 votes over the runner up Muhammad Ashraf Jabbar Qureshi of Pakistan Tehreek-e-Insaf. He garnered 21,537 votes while Qureshi received 8,978 votes.
