= Aslam Abro =

Pakistani politician

Muhammad Aslam Abro
- محمد اسلم ابڙو

Member of the Provincial Assembly of Sindh
- In office 13 August 2018 – 11 August 2023
- Constituency: PS-1 Jacobabad-I

Muhammad Aslam Abro (Sindhi: محمد اسلم ابڙو)is a Pakistani politician who had been a member of the Provincial Assembly of Sindh from August 2018 till August 2023.

== Political career ==
He was elected to the Provincial Assembly of Sindh as a candidate of Pakistan Tehreek-e-Insaf (PTI) from PS-1 (Jacobabad-I) in the 2018 Sindh provincial election. He received 36,896 votes and defeated Mir Aurang Zaib Panhwar, a candidate of the Pakistan People's Party (PPP).

On 11 March 2021 was expelled from the PTI for voting against his party's candidates in the 2021 Pakistani Senate election.

On 26 October 2023, he joined the PPP.
