= Malik Shehzad Awan =

Pakistani politician

Member of the Provincial Assembly of Sindh
- In office 13 August 2018 – 11 August 2023
- Constituency: PS-116 (Karachi West-V)

Personal details
- Born: Karachi, Sindh, Pakistan
- Other political affiliations: PTI (2018–2023)

Malik Shehzad Awan is a Pakistani politician and transport sector representative who served as a member of the Provincial Assembly of Sindh from August 2018 to August 2023. He is also associated with the Pakistan Goods Transport Alliance and has served as its president.

== Early life ==
Awan was born in Karachi, Sindh. Details regarding his early life, education, and family background are not widely available in reliable public sources.

== Political career ==
=== Election to Sindh Assembly (2018) ===
Awan was elected to the Provincial Assembly of Sindh in the 2018 Pakistani general election as a candidate of Pakistan Tehreek-e-Insaf (PTI) from constituency PS-116 (Karachi West-V). He assumed office on 13 August 2018.

=== Legislative role and constituency work ===
During his tenure (2018–2023), Awan represented Karachi West District and was part of the opposition benches in the Sindh Assembly, as PTI was not in power in the province.

His role included participation in assembly proceedings, raising constituency-related issues, and engaging in party organisational activities in Karachi. His political focus remained largely on local governance matters such as infrastructure, municipal services, and public concerns within his constituency.

=== Party differences and resignation attempts ===
In 2021, Awan reportedly submitted his resignation from the Sindh Assembly in protest against internal party decisions related to ticket distribution in Karachi by-elections. The resignation was not immediately accepted, and he continued to serve until the completion of the assembly's term.

=== Departure from PTI and politics (2023) ===
In June 2023, following the 2023 Pakistani protests on 9 May, Awan announced his departure from PTI and stated that he was quitting active politics. He condemned attacks on state and military installations and said he could no longer remain affiliated with the party.

His term ended on 11 August 2023 upon the dissolution of the Sindh Assembly.

== Role in transport sector ==
Apart from his political career, Awan has been active in Pakistan's transport and logistics sector through his association with the Pakistan Goods Transport Alliance. In this role, he has represented transporters on issues such as fuel price adjustments, taxation policies, freight rates, and regulatory challenges faced by the industry.

He has also been quoted in media reports highlighting concerns of transport operators and calling for government facilitation measures.

== Controversies ==
Awan has been mentioned in media reports in connection with legal cases. He has denied the allegations and stated that the matters are sub judice.

== See also ==
- Provincial Assembly of Sindh
- 2018 Pakistani general election
- Pakistan Tehreek-e-Insaf
