= Sajid Hussain Mir =

Pakistani politician

Member of the Provincial Assembly of Sindh
- Incumbent
- Assumed office 25 February 2024
- Constituency: PS-93 Karachi Korangi-IV

Personal details
- Born: 1976 (age 49–50) Karachi, Sindh, Pakistan
- Party: PTI (2024-preset)

Sajid Hussain Mir is a Pakistani politician who has been a Member of the Provincial Assembly of Sindh since 25 February 2024.

== Political career ==
He was elected to the 16th Provincial Assembly of Sindh as a Pakistan Tehreek-e-Insaf-backed independent candidate from constituency PS-93 Karachi Korangi-IV in the 2024 Pakistani general election.
