= Abdul Haseeb =

Politician

Member of the Provincial Assembly of Sindh
- In office 2008 – 28 May 2018
- Constituency: PS-92 (Karachi-IV)

Personal details
- Born: 10 May 1962 (age 64) Karachi, Sindh, Pakistan

Abdul Haseeb is a Pakistani politician who had been a Member of the Provincial Assembly of Sindh, from 2008 to May 2018.

== Early life and education ==
He was born on 10 May 1962 in Karachi.

He has a degree in Master of Arts and a degree in Bachelors of Arts, both from Karachi University.

== Political career ==
He was elected to the Provincial Assembly of Sindh as a candidate of Mutahida Quami Movement (MQM) from Constituency PS-92 (Karachi-IV) in the 2008 Pakistani general election. He received 30,981 votes and defeated Shabbir Qureshi, a candidate of Pakistan Peoples Party (PPP).

He was re-elected to the Provincial Assembly of Sindh as a candidate of MQM from Constituency PS-92 Karachi-IV in the 2013 Pakistani general election. He received 37,777 votes and defeated Abdullah Baloch, a candidate of PPP.
