= PS-59 Tando Allahyar-II =

Constituency of the Provincial Assembly of Sindh, Pakistan

- Constituency for the Provincial Assembly of Sindh
- Region: Tando Allahyar Tehsil (partly), Chambar Tehsil and Jhando Mari Tehsil (partly) of Tando Allahyar District
- Electorate: 210,750

Current constituency
- Member: Noor Ahmed Thebo
- Created from: PS-52 Hyderabad-X (2002-2018); PS-61 Tando Allahyar-II (2018-2023)

PS-59 Tando Allahyar-II (پی ایس-59، ٹنڈو اللہ یار-2) is a constituency of the Provincial Assembly of Sindh.

== General elections 2024 ==
Provincial election 2024: PS-59 Tando Allahyar-II
Party	Candidate	Votes	%	±%
PPP	Noor Ahmed Thebo	62,771	65.23	
GDA	Muhammad Mohsin	29,325	30.47	
Others	Others (nine candidates)	4,132	4.30	
Turnout		99,777	47.34	
Total valid votes		96,228	96.44	
Rejected ballots		3,549	3.56	
Majority		33,446	34.76	
Registered electors		210,750		
PPP hold				

== General elections 2018 ==
Provincial election 2018: PS-61 Tando Allahyar-II
Party	Candidate	Votes	%	±%
PPP	Imdad Ali Pitafi	47,394	52.63	
GDA	Khair Muhammad Khokhar	38,990	43.30	
MQM-P	Abdul Hafeez	1,367	1.52	
PTI	Muhammad Aslam	642	0.71	
Independent	Zulqarnain Khokhar	591	0.66	
SUP	Sahib Ali	206	0.23	
Independent	Altaf Hussain	187	0.21	
Independent	Amershi	176	0.20	
Independent	Asad Ali	155	0.17	
PRHP	Dhani Bux	117	0.13	
Independent	Amrio	96	0.11	
Independent	Aijaz Ali	67	0.07	
Independent	Muhammad Saleh Kumbhar	39	0.04	
Independent	Habibullah Palh	27	0.03	
Majority		8,404	9.33	
Valid ballots		90,054		
Rejected ballots		3,652		
Turnout		93,706		
Registered electors		163,530		
hold				

== General elections 2013 ==
Contesting candidates	Party affiliation	Votes polled

== General elections 2008 ==
Contesting candidates	Party affiliation	Votes polled

== See also ==
- PS-58 Tando Allahyar-I
- PS-60 Hyderabad-I
