= Khan Muhammad Dahri =

Pakistani politician

Sardar Khan Muhammad Dahri

Member of the Provincial Assembly of Sindh
- In office 13 August 2018 – 11 August 2023
- Constituency: PS-40 Nawabshah-IV

Personal details
- Party: Pakistan Peoples Party

Sardar Khan Muhammad Dahri is a Pakistani politician who had been a member of the Provincial Assembly of Sindh from August 2018 till August 2023.

== Political career ==
He was elected to the Provincial Assembly of Sindh as a candidate of Pakistan Peoples Party from Constituency PS-40 (Shaheed Benazirabad-IV) in the 2018 Pakistani general election.
