= Rehan Rajpoot =

Member of the Provincial Assembly of Sindh from Hyderabad (2024–2029)

- ریحان راجپوت

Member of the Provincial Assembly of Sindh
- Incumbent
- Assumed office 28 February 2024
- Constituency: PS-63 Hyderabad-IV

Personal details
- Born: Hyderabad, Sindh, Pakistan
- Party: PTI (2024-present)

Muhammad Rehan Rajpoot (Urdu: محمد ریحان راجپوت) is a Pakistani politician who is a member of the Provincial Assembly of Sindh.

== Political career ==
Rajpoot won the 2024 Sindh provincial election from PS-63 Hyderabad-IV as an Independent candidate. He received 40,306 votes while runner up Kamran Shafique of Muttahida Qaumi Movement – Pakistan received 11,844 votes.
