= Shah Hussain Shah Sheerazi =

Pakistani politician (born 1977)

Member of the Provincial Assembly of Sindh
- In office 13 August 2018 – 11 August 2023
- Constituency: PS-75 Sujawal-I
- In office 29 May 2013 – 28 May 2018

Personal details
- Born: 20 July 1977 (age 48) Thatta, Sindh, Pakistan
- Party: PPP (2013-present)

Shah Hussain Shah Sheerazi is a Pakistani politician who had been a Member of the Provincial Assembly of Sindh, from August 2018 to August 2023 and from May 2013 to May 2018.

== Early life ==
He was born on 20 July 1977 in Thatta.

== Political career ==
He was elected to the Provincial Assembly of Sindh as a candidate of Pakistan Muslim League (N) from Constituency PS-86 THATTA-III in the 2013 Pakistani general election.

He was re-elected to Provincial Assembly of Sindh as a candidate of Pakistan Peoples Party (PPP) from Constituency PS-75 (Sujawal-I) in the 2018 Pakistani general election.
