= Kulsoom Akhtar Chandio =

Pakistani politician

Member of the Provincial Assembly of Sindh
- In office 13 August 2018 – 11 August 2023
- Constituency: Reserved seat for women
- In office 2008 – 28 May 2018

Personal details
- Party: Pakistan Peoples Party

Kulsoom Akhtar Chandio is a Pakistani politician who had been a Member of the Provincial Assembly of Sindh, from August 2018 to August 2023 and from 2008 to May 2018.

== Education ==
She has done Bachelor of Science, Bachelor of Laws and Master of Arts in Economics.

== Political career ==
She was elected to the Provincial Assembly of Sindh as a candidate of Pakistan Peoples Party (PPP) on a reserved seat for women in the 2008 Pakistani general election.

She was re-elected to the Provincial Assembly of Sindh as a candidate of PPP on a reserved seat for women in the 2013 Pakistani general election.

She was re-elected to the Provincial Assembly of Sindh as a candidate of PPP on a reserved seat for women in 2018 Pakistani general election.
