= Makhdoom Rafik Zaman =

Pakistani politician

Member of the Provincial Assembly of Sindh
- In office 13 August 2018 – 11 August 2023
- Constituency: PS-59 Matiari-II
- In office 29 May 2013 – 28 May 2018

Personal details
- Born: 24 February 1955 (age 71) Hala, Sindh
- Party: Pakistan Peoples Party

Makhdoom Rafik Zaman is a Pakistani politician who had been a member of the Provincial Assembly of Sindh from August 2018 to August 2023 and from May 2013 to May 2018.

== Early life and education ==
He was born on 24 February 1955 in Hala, Sindh.

He has a degree of Bachelor of Medicine, Bachelor of Surgery from Liaquat National Medical College.

== Political career ==
He has been Home Minister of Sindh.

He also became Nazim/Mayor of Hyderabad from 2001-2005. He was elected to the Provincial Assembly of Sindh as a candidate of Pakistan Peoples Party (PPP) from Constituency PS-44 MATIARI-CUM-HYDERABAD in the 2013 Pakistani general election.

He was re-elected to Provincial Assembly of Sindh as a candidate of PPP from Constituency PS-59 (Matiari-II) in the 2018 Pakistani general election.
