= Jam Madad Ali Khan =

Pakistani politician (1962–2020)

Member of the Provincial Assembly of Sindh
- In office 15 August 2018 – 13 November 2020
- In office June 2013 – May 2018
- In office 2008–2013

Personal details
- Born: 14 December 1962 Sanghar
- Died: 13 November 2020 (aged 57) Karachi
- Party: Pakistan Peoples Party

Jam Madad Ali Khan (14 December 1962 – 13 November 2020) was a Pakistani politician and a Member of the Provincial Assembly of Sindh from June 2013 to May 2018.He was elected as leader of the Opposition in the Provincial Assembly of Sindh in 2008.

== Early life and education ==
He was born on 14 December 1962, in Sanghar.

He attended college in London, United Kingdom, but due to the death of his father Nawab Jam Anwar Ali Khan he had to come back to Pakistan. He then completed a Bachelor of Arts degree at the University of Sindh. Later he completed his Master of Arts degree in London.

== Political career ==
He was elected as leader of the Opposition in the Provincial Assembly of Sindh in 2008 where he served until 2011.

He ran for the seat of the Provincial Assembly of Sindh as a candidate of the Pakistan Muslim League (F) (PML-F) from Constituency PS-81 SANGHAR-CUM-MIRPURKHAS-II in the 2013 Pakistani general election but was unsuccessful.

He was elected to the Provincial Assembly of Sindh as a candidate of PML-F from Constituency PS-81 SANGHAR-CUM-MIRPURKHAS-II in by-polls held in June 2013.

In February 2017, he resigned from his seat in the Provincial Assembly of Sindh after quitting PML-F to join Pakistan Peoples Party (PPP).

He was re-elected to the Provincial Assembly of Sindh as a candidate of PPP from Constituency PS-81 SANGHAR-CUM-MIRPURKHAS-II in by-polls held in April 2017.

He was re-elected to the Provincial Assembly of Sindh as a candidate of PPP from Constituency PS-43 (Sanghar-III) in the 2018 Pakistani general election.

== Death ==
He died on 13 November 2020, in Karachi, due to COVID-19.
