= Sadia Javed =

Pakistani politician

Member of the Provincial Assembly of Sindh
- In office 13 August 2018 – 11 August 2023
- Constituency: Reserved seat for women

Personal details
- Party: PPP (2018-present)

Sadia Javed is a Pakistani politician who had been a member of the Provincial Assembly of Sindh from August 2018 to August 2023.

== Political career ==
She was elected to the Provincial Assembly of Sindh as a candidate of Pakistan Peoples Party (PPP) on a reserved seat for women in the 2018 Pakistani general election.

She is also elected the member of Sindh Assembly for another term of five years from 2024 to 2029. She is also appointed the Syndicate member of Karachi University for three years from 2024 to 2027.
