= Rabia Khatoon =

Pakistani politician

Member of the Provincial Assembly of Sindh
- In office 13 August 2018 – 11 August 2023
- Constituency: Reserved seat for women

Personal details
- Born: Karachi, Sindh, Pakistan
- Party: MQM-P (2018-present)

Rabia Khatoon is a Pakistani politician who had been a member of the Provincial Assembly of Sindh from August 2018 to August 2023.

== Political career ==
She was elected to the Provincial Assembly of Sindh as a candidate of Muttahida Qaumi Movement (MQM) on a reserved seat for women in the 2018 Pakistani general election.
