= PS-113 Karachi Keamari-III =

Constituency of the Provincial Assembly of Sindh, Pakistan

- Constituency for the Provincial Assembly of Sindh
- Region: Baldia Town (partly) and SITE Town (partly) of Keamari District in Karachi
- Electorate: 211,902

Current constituency
- Member: Vacant
- Created from: PS-92 Karachi-IV (2002-2018); PS-115 Karachi West-IV (2018-2023)

PS-113 Karachi Keamari-III (پی ایس-113، کراچی کیماڑی-3) is a constituency of the Provincial Assembly of Sindh.

== General elections 2024 ==
Provincial election 2024: PS-113 Karachi Keamari-III
Party	Candidate	Votes	%	±%
MQM-P	Faheem Ahmed Patni	24,465	30.57	
Independent	Ghulam Qadir (Note: Filed nomination papers as PTI candidate but ECP allowed him to run as an Independent)	21,031	26.28	
TLP	Hafiz Ghulam Sarwar	10,383	12.97	
JI	Muhammad Arshad Oureshi	7,588	9.48	
PPP	Muhammad Ibrahim Baloch	7,093	8.86	
PML(N)	Salheen	5,457	6.82	
Independent	Tariq Aziz	1,254	1.57	
ANP	Israr Uddin	905	1.13	
Others	Others (seventeen candidates)	1,860	2.32	
Turnout		81,406	38.42	
Total valid votes		80,036	98.32	
Rejected ballots		1,370	1.68	
Majority		3,434	4.29	
Registered electors		211,902		
MQM-P gain from PTI				

== General elections 2018 ==
Provincial election 2018: PS-115 Karachi West-IV
Party	Candidate	Votes	%	±%
TLP	Mufti Muhammad Qasim	21,596	27.08	
PTI	Abdul Rehman	15,071	18.90	
PML(N)	Ghulam Shoaib	13,449	16.87	
MQM-P	Faizan Mustafa Jafri	10,404	13.05	
PPP	K. S. Mujahid Khan Baloch	7,009	8.79	
MMA	Hafiz Muhamamd Naeem	6,227	7.81	
ANP	Qaim Khan Afridi	1,809	2.27	
PSP	Muhammad Saqib	1,538	1.93	
Independent	Syed Sabir Ali Raza	910	1.14	
Independent	Fazal Ahad	834	1.05	
APML	Syed Ameer Hussain	214	0.27	
Independent	Anwar Ul Haq Abbasi	197	0.25	
Independent	Abdul Ahad	147	0.18	
Independent	Kamran Akhtar	80	0.10	
Independent	Muhammad Javed Khalid	76	0.10	
Independent	Mohammad Salman Khan Baloch	52	0.07	
Independent	Hafiz Muhammad Mursalen	41	0.05	
Independent	Imran	38	0.05	
Independent	Zahid Mehmood	32	0.04	
Independent	Muhammad Javed Baloch	17	0.02	
Majority		6,525	8.18	
Valid ballots		79,741		
Rejected ballots		1,668		
Turnout		81,409		
Registered electors		198,179		
hold				

== See also ==
- PS-112 Karachi Keamari-II
- PS-114 Karachi Keamari-IV
