= Ghazalla Sial =

Politician in Pakistan

Member of the Provincial Assembly of Sindh
- In office 13 August 2018 – 11 August 2023
- Constituency: Reserved seat for women
- In office June 2013 – 28 May 2018

Personal details
- Born: 29 January 1966 (age 60) Khairpur, Sindh, Pakistan
- Party: Pakistan Peoples Party Parliamentarians

Ghazalla Sial or Ghazala Siyal (Urdu: غزالہ سیال) is a Pakistani politician who had been a member of the Provincial Assembly of Sindh from August 2018 to August 2023 and from June 2013 to May 2018.

== Early life and education ==
She was born on 29 January 1966 in Khairpur District. She earned an LL.B. and the Master of Arts from Shah Abdul Latif University. and also done Master of Laws.

== Political career ==
She was elected to the Provincial Assembly of Sindh as a candidate of Pakistan Peoples Party (PPP) on a reserved seat for women in the 2013 Pakistani general election.

She was then re-elected to the Provincial Assembly of Sindh as a candidate of the Pakistan Peoples Party Parliamentarians to a similar seat in the 2018 Pakistani general election.
