= Ali Khursheedi =

Pakistani politician

Leader of the Opposition of the Provincial Assembly of Sindh
- Incumbent
- Assumed office 31 March 2024
- Preceded by: Rana Ansar

Member of the Provincial Assembly of Sindh
- Incumbent
- Assumed office 25 February 2024
- Constituency: PS-119 Karachi West-IV
- In office 13 August 2018 – 11 August 2023
- Constituency: PS-119 (Karachi West-VIII)

Personal details
- Born: Karachi, Sindh, Pakistan
- Party: MQM-P (2018-present)

Ali Khursheedi is a Pakistani politician who is a member of the Provincial Assembly of Sindh and is currently serving as the Leader of Opposition in the Provincial Assembly of Sindh since March 2024. He contested as the candidate for Chief Minister of Sindh for the Muttahida Qaumi Movement – Pakistan (MQM-P) in the 2024 Sindh provincial election against Murad Ali Shah of the Pakistan Peoples Party. Following the election, Murad Ali Shah won a third term, while Khursheedi's party nominated him as the Opposition Leader in Sindh Assembly in March 2024.

== Political career ==
He was elected to the Provincial Assembly of Sindh as a candidate of Muttahida Qaumi Movement – Pakistan from Constituency PS-119 (Karachi West-VIII) in the 2018 Pakistani general election. He was officially nominated by the MQM-P to be candidate for the position of Chief Minister of Sindh in the 2024 Sindh provincial election, though was defeated by the Pakistan People's Party (PPP). He was elected to the 16th Provincial Assembly of Sindh as a candidate of the MQM-P from constituency PS-119 Karachi West-IV in the 2024 Sindh provincial election. He was nominated by the MQM-P for the slot of opposition leader in the Sindh Assembly against the PPP government.
