= Mohammad Rashid Khilji =

Pakistani politician

Member of the Provincial Assembly of Sindh
- In office 13 August 2018 – 11 August 2023
- Constituency: PS-66 Hyderabad-V
- In office 29 May 2013 – 28 May 2018

Personal details
- Born: 12 June 1973 (age 52) Hyderabad, Sindh, Pakistan
- Party: MQM-P (2018-present)
- Other political affiliations: MQM-L (2013-2018)

Mohammad Rashid Khilji (born 12 June 1973) is a Pakistani politician who has been a member of the Provincial Assembly of Sindh from August 2018 to August 2023 and from May 2013 to May 2018.

== Early life and education ==
He was born on 12 June 1973 in Hyderabad, Pakistan.

He has a degree of Bachelor of Engineering from Mehran University of Engineering and Technology.

== Political career ==
He was elected to the Provincial Assembly of Sindh as a candidate of Mutahida Quami Movement (MQM) from Constituency PS-46 HYDERABAD-II in the 2013 Pakistani general election.

He was re-elected to Provincial Assembly of Sindh as a candidate of MQM from Constituency PS-66 (Hyderabad-V) in the 2018 Pakistani general election.
