= Nusrat Seher Abbasi =

Pakistani politician

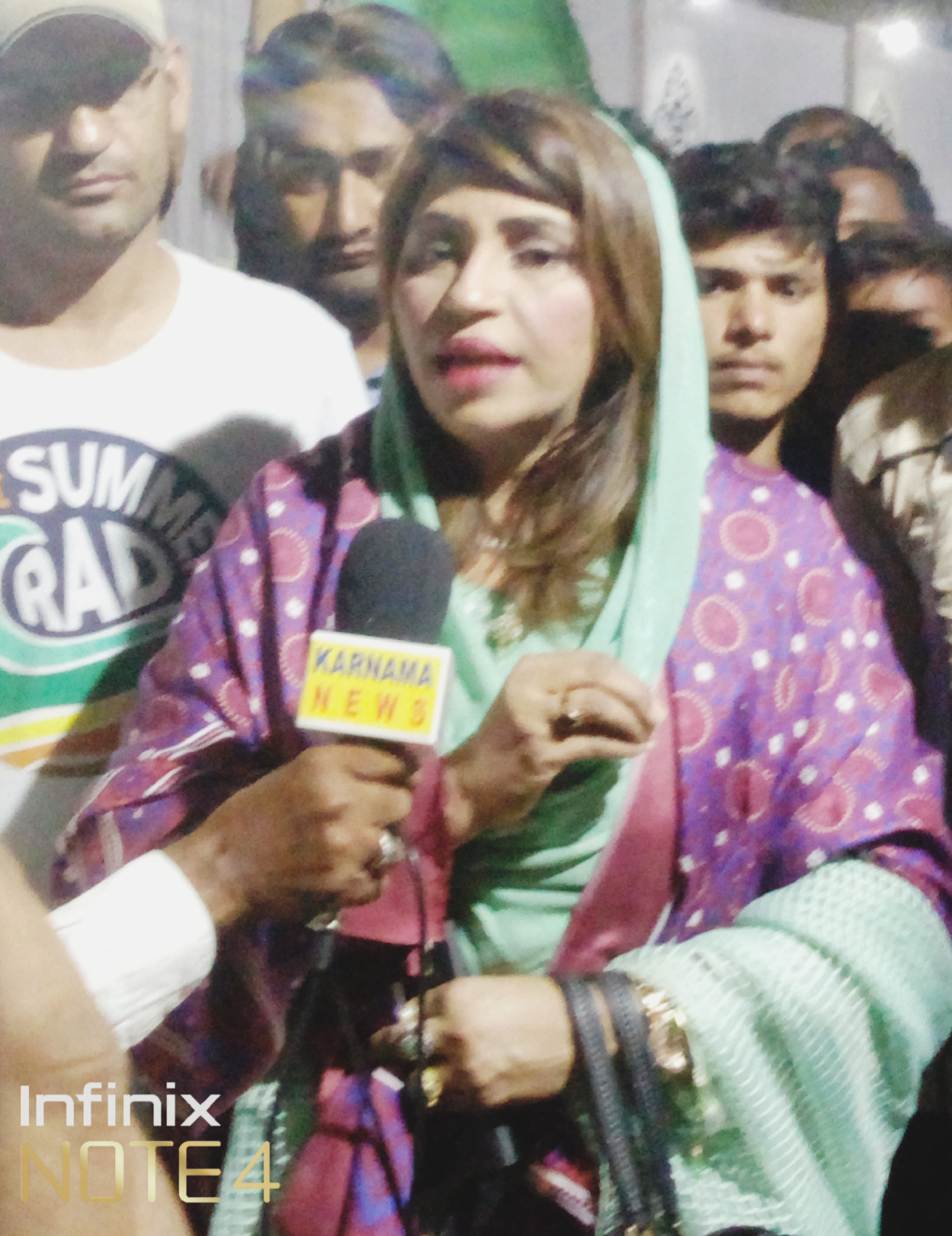

Member of the Provincial Assembly of Sindh
- In office 13 August 2018 – 11 August 2023
- Constituency: Reserved seat for women
- In office 2008 – 28 May 2017

Personal details
- Born: 29 January 1969 (age 57) Rohri, West Pakistan, Pakistan
- Party: Pakistan Muslim League (F)

Nusrat Bano Sehar Abbasi is a Pakistani politician who had been a member of the Provincial Assembly of Sindh, from August 2018 to August 2023 and from 2008 to May 2018.

== Early life and education ==
She was born on 29 January 1969 in Rohri.

She earned a Bachelor of Arts in economics, Bachelor of Law and the Master of Arts in economics, all from Shah Abdul Latif University.

== Political career ==
She was elected to the Provincial Assembly of Sindh as a candidate of Pakistan Muslim League (F) (PML-F) on a reserved seat for women in the 2008 Pakistani general election.

She was re-elected to the Provincial Assembly of Sindh as a candidate of PML-F on a reserved seat for women in the 2013 Pakistani general election.

She was re-elected to the Provincial Assembly of Sindh as a candidate of Grand Democratic Alliance (GDA) on a reserved seat for women in the 2018 Pakistani general election.
