= Tariq Masood Arain =

Pakistani politician

Member of the Provincial Assembly of Sindh
- In office 13 August 2018 – 11 August 2023
- Constituency: PS-38 Nawabshah-II
- In office 29 May 2013 – 28 May 2018

Personal details
- Born: 1 July 1973 (age 52) Nawabshah District
- Party: Pakistan Peoples Party
- Parent: Manzoor Ahmed Arain (father)

Tariq Masood Arain is a Punjabi Pakistani politician who had been a member of the Provincial Assembly of Sindh from August 2018 till August 2023 and from May 2013 till May 2018.

== Early life and education ==
He was born on 1 July 1973 in Nawabshah District.

He is a graduate of University of Sindh.

== Political career ==
He was elected to the Provincial Assembly of Sindh as a candidate of Pakistan Peoples Party (PPP) from Constituency PS-24 SHAHEED BANAZIR ABAD-I in the 2013 Pakistani general election.

He was re-elected to Provincial Assembly of Sindh as a candidate of PPP from Constituency PS-38 (Shaheed Benazirabad-II) in the 2018 Pakistani general election.
