= PS-39 Shaheed Benazirabad-IV =

Constituency of the Provincial Assembly of Sindh, Pakistan

- Constituency for the Provincial Assembly of Sindh
- Region: Kazi Ahmed Taluka and Daur Taluka (partly) of Shaheed Benazirabad District
- Electorate: 209,961

Current constituency
- Member: Bahadur Khan Dahri
- Created from: PS-28 Nawabshah-V (2002-2018); PS-40 Nawabshah-IV (2018-2023)

PS-39 Shaheed Benazirabad-IV (پی ایس-۳۹، شہید بینظیر آباد-۴) is a constituency of the Provincial Assembly of Sindh.

== General elections 2024 ==
Provincial election 2024: PS-39 Shaheed Benazirabad-IV
Party	Candidate	Votes	%	±%
PPP	Bahadur Khan Dahri	70,134	75.14	
GDA	Arif Niaz Arain	15,111	16.19	
PTI	Abdul Latif (Note: Filed nomination papers as PTI candidate but ECP allowed him to run as an Independent)	2,468	2.64	
Independent	Ali Hassan Khaskheli	1,336	1.43	
Others	Others (sixteen candidates)	4,295	4.60	
Turnout		97,880	46.62	
Total valid votes		93,344	95.37	
Rejected ballots		4,536	4.63	
Majority		55,023	58.95	
Registered electors		209,961		
PPP hold				

== General elections 2018 ==
Provincial election 2018: PS-38 Shaheed Benazirabad-II
Party	Candidate	Votes	%	±%
PPP	Khan Muhammad Dahri	56,755	63.93	
GDA	Asif Ali Shah	19,837	22.35	
Independent	Ali Bux	2,180	2.46	
MMA	Ahsanullah	2,044	2.30	
PTI	Abdul Waheed	1,867	2.10	
TLP	Muhammad Hanif	1,189	1.34	
Independent	Nasrullah	1,054	1.19	
Independent	Sikandar Ali	842	0.95	
Independent	Altaf Hussain	615	0.69	
Independent	Bahadur Khan Dahri	573	0.65	
Independent	Afshan Iqbal	449	0.51	
Independent	Abdul Latif	326	0.37	
Independent	Syed Faseeh Ahmed Shah	283	0.32	
Tabdeeli Pasand Party Pakistan	Abdul Qadir Khilji	266	0.30	
AAT	Sardar Hussain	246	0.28	
Independent	Ali Jan	164	0.18	
PSP	Zahida Yaseen	82	0.09	
Majority		36,918	41.58	
Valid ballots		88,772		
Rejected ballots		5,794		
Turnout		94,566		
Registered electors		181,828		
hold				

== General elections 2013 ==
Contesting candidates	Party affiliation	Votes polled

== General elections 2008 ==
Contesting candidates	Party affiliation	Votes polled

== See also ==
- PS-38 Nawabshah-III
- PS-40 Sanghar-I
