= Sajeela Leghari =

Pakistani politician

Member of the Provincial Assembly of Sindh
- In office 13 August 2018 – 11 August 2023
- Constituency: Reserved seat for women
- In office June 2013 – 28 May 2018

Personal details
- Born: 29 March 1954 (age 72) Dadu, Sindh, Pakistan
- Party: PPP (2013-present)

Sajeela Leghari is a Pakistani politician who had been a Member of the Provincial Assembly of Sindh, from August 2018 to August 2023 and from June 2013 to May 2018. Previously, she had been a Member of the Provincial Assembly of Sindh from 2006 to 2007 and again from 2008 to 2013.

== Early life and education ==
She was born on 29 March 1964 in Dadu.

She earned the degree of Bachelor of Medicine and Bachelor of Surgery from Liaquat University of Medical and Health Sciences.

== Political career ==
She was elected to the Provincial Assembly of Sindh as a candidate of Pakistan Muslim League (Q) (PML-Q) from Constituency PS-75 (Dadu-V) in September 2006.

She was re-elected to the Provincial Assembly of Sindh as a candidate of PML-Q on a reserved seat for women in the 2008 Pakistani general election.

She was re-elected to the Provincial Assembly of Sindh as a candidate of Pakistan Peoples Party (PPP) on a reserved seat for women in the 2013 Pakistani general election.

She was re-elected to the Provincial Assembly of Sindh as a candidate of PPP on a reserved seat for women in the 2018 Pakistani general election.
