= Anthony Naveed =

Pakistani politician

Deputy Speaker of the Provincial Assembly of Sindh
- Incumbent
- Assumed office 25 February 2024

Member of the Provincial Assembly of Sindh
- Incumbent
- Assumed office 25 February 2024
- Constituency: Reserved seat for minorities
- In office 13 August 2018 – 11 August 2023
- Constituency: Reserved seat for minorities

Personal details
- Party: PPP (2018-present)

Anthony Naveed (Urdu: انتھونی نوید) is a Pakistani politician who had been a member for the Provincial Assembly of Sindh from August 2018 to August 2023.

== Political career ==
He was elected to Provincial Assembly of Sindh on a reserved seat for minorities in the 2018 Pakistani general election representing Pakistan Peoples Party Parliamentarians.

Naveed is a Roman Catholic and was elected under Pakistan's law of allotting seats to religious minorities. As member of the assembly, he has spoken out against a proposed bill that would have applicants state their religious identification before applying, arguing that it would further promote religious discrimination.
