= Shaheena Sher Ali =

Pakistani politician

Member of the Provincial Assembly of Sindh
- In office June 2013 – 11 August 2023
- Constituency: Reserved seat for women
- In office June 2013 – 28 May 2018

Personal details
- Born: 6 June 1986 (age 39) Karachi, Sindh, Pakistan
- Party: PPP (2013-present)

Shaheena Sher Ali is a Pakistani politician who had been a Member of the Provincial Assembly of Sindh, and current minister of women development authority sindh general secretary of women wing karachi ppp. from August 2018 to August 2023 and from June 2013 to May 2018.

== Early life and education ==
She was born on 6 June 1986 in Karachi.

She graduated from the University of Sindh.

== Political career ==
Shaheena sher ali is current minister of women development authority sindh and general secretary of women wing karachi devison Pakistan people party She was elected to the Provincial Assembly of Sindh as a candidate of Pakistan Peoples Party (PPP) on a reserved seat for women in the 2013 Pakistani general election.

She was re-elected to the Provincial Assembly of Sindh as a candidate of PPP on a reserved seat for women in the 2018 Pakistani general election.
