= Sanjay Perwani =

Pakistani politician

- سنجے پروانی
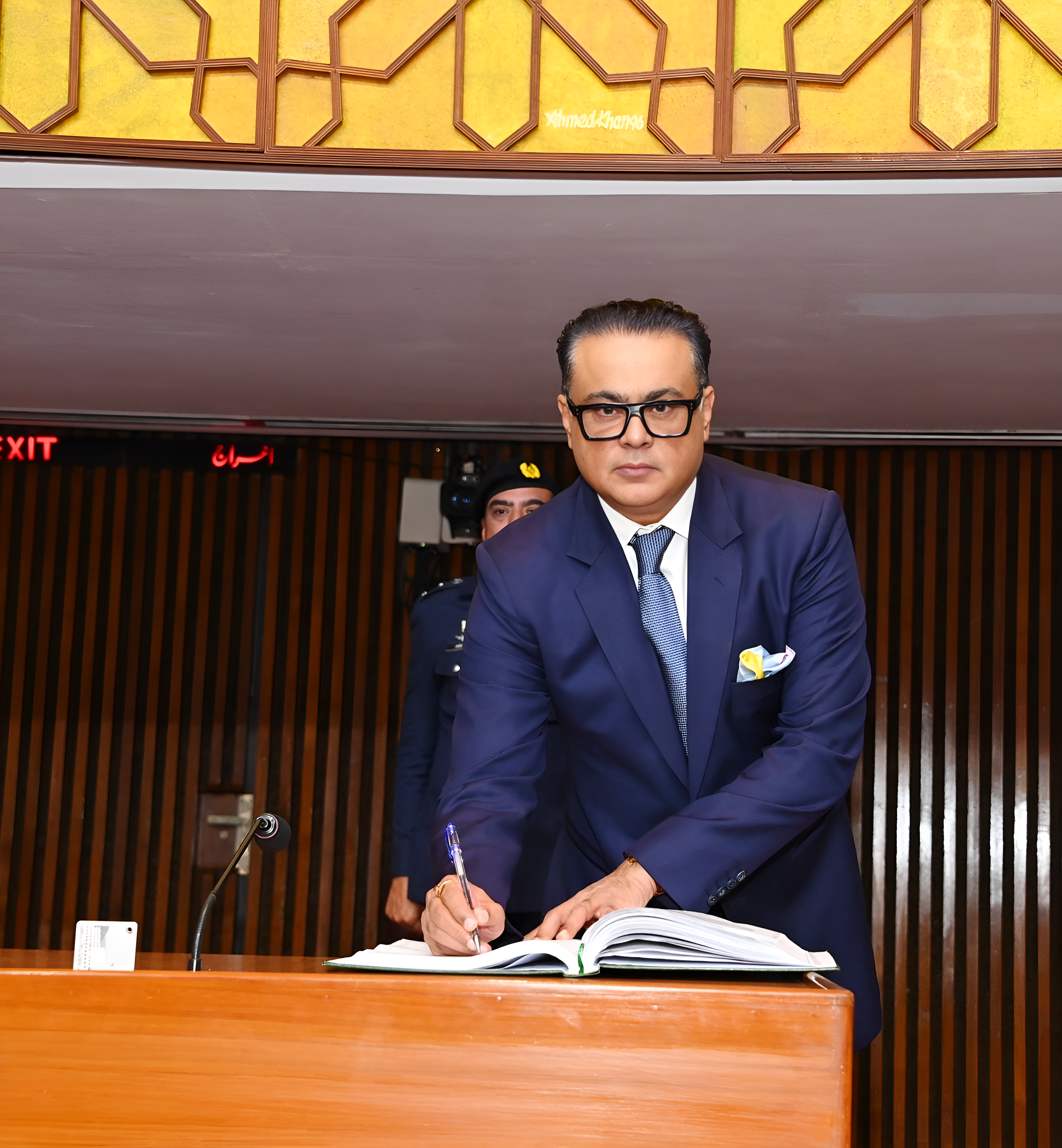

Member of the National Assembly of Pakistan
- Incumbent
- Assumed office 14 January 2025
- Constituency: Reserved seat for minorities
- In office 1 June 2013 – 31 May 2018
- Constituency: Reserved seat for minorities

Personal details
- Born: Karachi, Sindh, Pakistan
- Party: MQM-P (2018-present)
- Other political affiliations: MQM-L (2013-2018)

Sanjay Perwani (Urdu: سنجے پروانی) is a Pakistani politician who has been a member of the Provincial Assembly of Sindh since August 2018. Previously he was a member of the National Assembly of Pakistan, from June 2013 to May 2018, and again from 14 January 2025 to till date.

== Political career ==
He was elected to the National Assembly of Pakistan as a candidate of Muttahida Qaumi Movement (MQM) on a seat reserved for minorities in the 2013 Pakistani general election.

He was elected to the Provincial Assembly of Sindh as a candidate of MQM on a seat reserved for minorities in the 2018 Pakistani general election.
