= Waryam Faqqeer =

Pakistani politician

Member of the Provincial Assembly of Sindh
- In office 13 August 2017 – 11 August 2023
- Constituency: PS-46 Sanghar-VI
- In office 29 May 2013 – 28 May 2018

Personal details
- Born: 14 August 1947 (age 78) Sanghar District
- Party: Grand Democratic Alliance

Waryam Faqqeer is a Pakistani politician who had been a member of the Provincial Assembly of Sindh, from August 2018 till August 2023 from May 2013 to May 2018.

== Early life ==
He was born on 14 August 1947 in Sanghar District.

== Political career ==
He was elected to the Provincial Assembly of Sindh as a candidate of Pakistan Muslim League (F) from Constituency PS-79 SANGHAR-II in the 2013 Pakistani general election.

He was re-elected to Provincial Assembly of Sindh as a candidate of Grand Democratic Alliance (GDA) from Constituency PS-46 (Sanghar-VI) in the 2018 Pakistani general election.
