= Waqar Hussain Shah =

Pakistani politician

Member of the Provincial Assembly of Sindh
- In office June 2013 – 28 May 2018

Personal details
- Born: 10 June 1967 (age 58) Karachi, Sindh, Pakistan
- Party: MQM-P (2018-present)
- Other political affiliations: MQM-L (2013-2018)

Waqar Hussain Shah (born 10 June 1967) is a Pakistani politician who had been a Member of the Provincial Assembly of Sindh from June 2013 to May 2018.

== Early life and education ==
He was born on 10 June 1967 in Karachi.

He has a degree of Master of Arts in political science.

== Political career ==
He was elected to the Provincial Assembly of Sindh as a candidate of Mutahida Quami Movement from Constituency PS-128 KARACHI-XL in by-polls held in June 2013.
