= Muhammad Abbas Jafri =

Pakistani politician

Member of the Provincial Assembly of Sindh
- In office 13 August 2018 – 11 August 2023
- Constituency: PS-128 (Karachi Central-VI)

Personal details
- Born: Karachi, Sindh, Pakistan
- Party: MQM-P (2018–present)

Syed Muhammad Abbas Jafri is a Pakistani politician who was a member of the Provincial Assembly of Sindh from August 2018 to August 2023.

== Political career ==
He was elected to the Provincial Assembly of Sindh as a candidate of Muttahida Qaumi Movement from Constituency PS-128 (Karachi Central-VI) in the 2018 Pakistani general election.
