= Farhat Seemi =

Pakistani politician

Member of the Provincial Assembly of Sindh
- In office 13 August 2018 – 11 August 2023
- Constituency: Reserved seat for women
- In office June 2013 – 28 May 2018

Personal details
- Born: 11 September 1968 (age 57) Ratodero
- Party: Pakistan Peoples Party

Farhat Seemi is a Pakistani politician who had been a Member of the Provincial Assembly of Sindh from August 2018 to August 2023 and from June 2013 to May 2018.

== Early life and education ==
She was born on 11 September 1968 in Ratodero.

She has done Bachelor of Arts.

== Political career ==
She was elected to the Provincial Assembly of Sindh as a candidate of Pakistan Peoples Party (PPP) on a reserved seat for women in the 2013 Pakistani general election.

She was re-elected to the Provincial Assembly of Sindh as a candidate of PPP on a reserved seat for women in the 2018 Pakistani general election.
