= Naseem Rajpar =

Politician in Pakistan

Member of the Provincial Assembly of Sindh
- In office 13 August 2018 – 11 August 2023
- Constituency: Reserved for women

Personal details
- Born: Khairpur, Sindh, Pakistan
- Party: Grand Democratic Alliance
- Spouse: Rafique Ahmed Rajpar
- Children: 2

Naseem Rajpar is a Pakistani politician who had been a member of the Provincial Assembly of Sindh from August 2018 to August 2023.

== Personal life ==
Naseem was born in Khairpur located in Sindh province of Pakistan. She is married to Rafique Ahmed Rajpar and has two children. She lives in Karachi and has her permanent residence is in village Cheeho taluka located in Naushahro Feroze District.

== Political career ==
Naseem was elected to the Provincial Assembly of Sindh as a candidate of Grand Democratic Alliance (GDA) on a reserved seat for women in consequence of the 2018 Pakistani general election. She assumed the membership of the assembly on 13 August 2018.
