= Sarwat Fatima =

Pakistani politician

Member of the Provincial Assembly of Sindh
- In office 13 August 2018 – 11 August 2023
- Constituency: Reserved seat for women-159

Personal details
- Party: TLP (2018-present)

Sarwat Fatima is a Pakistani politician who has been a member of the Provincial Assembly of Sindh from August 2018 to August 2023.

== Political career ==
She was elected to the Provincial Assembly of Sindh as a candidate of Tehreek-e-Labbaik Pakistan on a reserved seat for women in the 2018 Pakistani general election.
