= Syed Ahmed Raza Shah Jeelani =

Member of the Provincial Assembly of Sindh
- In office 22 October 2018 – 11 August 2023
- Constituency: PS-30 Khairpur-V

Personal details
- Party: Pakistan Peoples Party
- Children: 8

Syed Ahmed Raza Shah Jeelani is a Pakistani politician who had been the member of the Provincial Assembly of Sindh from October 2018 to August 2023.

== Political career ==
Jeelani was elected to the Provincial Assembly of Sindh from the constituency PS-30 in the 2018 Pakistani by-elections on the ticket of Pakistan Peoples Party, defeating Syed Muharram Ali Shah of Grand Democratic Alliance.
