= Shamim Mumtaz =

Pakistani politician

Member of the Provincial Assembly of Sindh
- In office 13 August 2018 – 11 August 2023
- Constituency: Reserved seat for women
- In office June 2013 – 28 May 2018

Personal details
- Born: 15 November 1957 (age 68) Karachi
- Party: Pakistan Peoples Party

Shamim Mumtaz is a Pakistani politician who had been a Member of the Provincial Assembly of Sindh, from August 2018 to August 2023 and from June 2013 to May 2018.

== Early life and education ==
She was born on 15 November 1957 in Karachi.

She has done Bachelor of Arts.

== Political career ==
She was elected to the Provincial Assembly of Sindh as a candidate of Pakistan Peoples Party (PPP) on a reserved seat for women in the 2013 Pakistani general election.

In July 2016, she was inducted into the provincial Sindh cabinet of Chief Minister Syed Murad Ali Shah and was appointed Provincial Minister of Sindh for Social Welfare. In April 2017, she was denotified as Provincial Minister of Sindh for Social Welfare and was appointed Advisor to Chief Minister of Sindh on Social Welfare.

She was re-elected to the Provincial Assembly of Sindh as a candidate of PPP on a reserved seat for women in the 2018 Pakistani general election.
