= Qazi Shams-ud-Din Rajar =

Pakistani politician

Member of the Provincial Assembly of Sindh
- In office 13 August 2018 – 11 August 2023
- Constituency: PS-42 Sanghar-II

Personal details
- Party: Grand Democratic Alliance

Qazi Shams-ud-Din Rajar is a Pakistani politician who had been a member of the Provincial Assembly of Sindh from August 2018 till August 2023.

== Political career ==
He was elected to the Provincial Assembly of Sindh as a candidate of Grand Democratic Alliance from Constituency PS-42 (Sanghar-II) in the 2018 Pakistani general election.
