= Mufti Muhammad Qasim =

Pakistani politician

Member of the Provincial Assembly of Sindh
- In office 13 August 2018 – 11 August 2023
- Constituency: PS-115 Karachi West-IV

Personal details
- Born: 3 October 1983 (age 42) Quetta, Balochistan, Pakistan
- Party: TLP (2018-present)
- Children: 4

Mufti Muhammad Qasim (born 3 October 1983) is a Pakistani politician who had been a member of the Provincial Assembly of Sindh from August 2018 to August 2023.

== Early life and education ==
He was born on 3 October 1983 in Quetta, Balochistan, and completed his religious education in Karachi, completing Fazil courses from a Darul Uloom and in Arabic.

== Political career ==
He was elected to the Provincial Assembly of Sindh as a candidate of Tehreek-e-Labbaik Pakistan from Constituency PS-115 (Karachi West-IV) in the 2018 Pakistani general election.
