= PS-114 Karachi Keamari-IV =

Constituency of the Provincial Assembly of Sindh, Pakistan

- Constituency for the Provincial Assembly of Sindh
- Region: Keamari Town (partly) and SITE Town (partly) of Keamari District in Karachi
- Electorate: 226,274

Current constituency
- Member: Vacant
- Created from: PS-89 Karachi-I (2002-2018); PS-114 Karachi West-III (2018-2023)

PS-114 Karachi Keamari-IV (پی ایس-114، کراچی کیماڑی-4) is a constituency of the Provincial Assembly of Sindh.

== General elections 2024 ==
Provincial election 2024: PS-114 Karachi Keamari-IV
Party	Candidate	Votes	%	±%
Independent	Muhammad Shabbir Qureshi (Note: Filed nomination papers as PTI candidate but ECP allowed him to run as an Independent)	21,531	31.24	
PPP	Niaz Muhammad	14,559	21.13	
JI	Abdul Razzak	13,132	19.06	
JUI (F)	Muhammad Usman	7,111	10.32	
MQM-P	Fayaz Kaim Khani	3,831	5.56	
TLP	Ahsan UI Haq	3,622	5.26	
Independent	Altaf Hussain Mengal	2,098	3.04	
Others	Others (twenty six candidates)	3,033	4.39	
Turnout		69,049	30.52	
Total valid votes		68,917	99.81	
Rejected ballots		132	0.19	
Majority		6,972	10.11	
Registered electors		226,270		
PTI gain from PPP				

== General elections 2018 ==
General election 2018: PS-114 Karachi West-III
Party	Candidate	Votes	%	±%
PTI	Muhammad Shabbir Qureshi	13,325	19.99	
MQM-P	Syed Shahid Mian	12,129	18.19	
PPP	Mir Talib Hussain Brohi	11,775	17.66	
PML(N)	Saeedullah Khan	9,227	13.84	
MMA	Muhammad Usman	8,865	13.30	
TLP	Qaiser Ali Butt	5,869	8.80	
PSP	Syed Hafeezuddin	2,605	3.91	
Independent	Ghulam Mustafa	1,555	2.33	
ANP	Zafar Khan	597	0.90	
Independent	Asif Rehan	550	0.83	
MQM-H	Muhammad Asad Khan	76	0.11	
PST	Muhammad Imran	46	0.07	
Independent	Muhammad Rustam	30	0.05	
Independent	Muhammad Asif Khan	21	0.03	
Total valid votes		66,670		
Rejected ballots		1,507		
Registered electors		179,099		

== General elections 2013 ==
Contesting candidates	Party affiliation	Votes polled

== General elections 2008 ==
Contesting candidates	Party affiliation	Votes polled

== See also ==
- PS-113 Karachi Keamari-III
- PS-115 Karachi Keamari-V
