= Rana Ansar =

Pakistani politician

Leader of the Opposition of the Provincial Assembly of Sindh
- In office 26 July 2023 – 11 August 2023
- Preceded by: Haleem Adil Sheikh
- Succeeded by: Ali Khursheedi

Member of the Provincial Assembly of Sindh
- In office 13 August 2018 – 11 August 2023
- Constituency: Reserved seat for women
- In office 29 May 2013 – 28 May 2018
- Constituency: Reserved seat for women

Personal details
- Born: 17 August 1966 (age 59) Hyderabad, Sindh, Pakistan
- Party: MQM-P (2018-present)
- Other party: MQM-L (2013-2018)

Rana Ansar is a Pakistani politician who had been the Leader of the Opposition in Sindh from July 2023 to August 2023 and a member of the Provincial Assembly of Sindh from August 2018 to August 2023 and from June 2013 to May 2018.

== Early life and education ==
She was born on 17 August 1966 in Hyderabad, Pakistan.

She has earned the degree of Master of Arts in Islamic Culture from the University of Sindh.

== Political career ==
She was elected to the Provincial Assembly of Sindh as a candidate of Muttahida Qaumi Movement (MQM) on a reserved seat for women in the 2013 Pakistani general election.

She was re-elected to the Provincial Assembly of Sindh as a candidate of MQM-P on a reserved seat for women in the 2018 Pakistani general election.

On 13 July 2023, she was nominated as the Leader of the Opposition in the Provincial Assembly of Sindh by her party.
