= Mazahir Amir Khan =

Pakistani politician

Member of the Provincial Assembly of Sindh
- In office 29 May 2013 – 28 May 2018

Personal details
- Born: 11 November 1971 (age 54) Karachi, Sindh, Pakistan
- Party: MQM-P (2018-present)
- Other political affiliations: MQM-L (2008-2018)

Mazahir Amir Khan is a Pakistani politician who had been a Nazim of UC-08, Qasba Colony, SITE Town, from 2005 to 2008, and a member of the Provincial Assembly of Sindh from 2008 to 2018.

== Early life and education ==
Khan was born on 11 November 1971 in Karachi. He has a Bachelors of Arts from the Allama Iqbal Open University.

== Political career ==
Khan was elected to the Provincial Assembly of Sindh as a candidate of Mutahida Quami Movement from Constituency PS-96 KARACHI-VIII in the 2008 Pakistani general election and the 2013 Pakistani general election.
