= Sunni Tehreek =

Political party in Pakistan

Pakistan Sunni Tehreek سنی تحریک
- Leader: Sarwat Ejaz Qadri
- General Secretary: Ahmed Bilal Qadri
- Founder: Muhammad Saleem Qadri
- Founded: 1990; 36 years ago
- Split from: TLP
- Ideology: Pan-Islamism; Islamism
- Political position: Far-right politics
- Religion: Sunni Islam (specifically majority, Barelvi)
- Colors: Green

Election symbol
- Table Lamp (2018 General Election)

Website
- Official Website

Pakistan Sunni Tehreek or simply Sunni Tehreek is a Pakistani Barelvi organization. The organization was founded by Muhammad Saleem Qadri in 1990 in order to prevent Barelvi mosques from being seized by Deobandi and Wahabi organizations. It also sees itself as a defender of Barelvis from attacks from Deobandis and Wahabi Muslims.

The Islamist group is known for its strong support of Pakistan's controversial blasphemy laws, and for its hardline support of the death penalty for those accused of committing blasphemy. Sunni Tehreek is vocal in its support of Mumtaz Qadri, the bodyguard who murdered Punjab's governor Salman Taseer after Taseer called the blasphemy laws as "Black Laws". According to him, these laws were comparable to the Rowlatt Act, a blatant lie. Supporters of the organization assaulted the popular former pop-star Junaid Jamshed, and called for his prosecution under the blasphemy laws.

The party was delisted in January 2024 by the Election Commission of Pakistan for failing to conduct intra-party elections.

== History ==
After the fragmentation and decline of the Muttahida Qaumi Movement, Pakistan Sunni Tehreek arose as the primary opposition to the Deobandi-Wahabi Banuri Mosque, headed by Nizamuddin Shamzai. The Pakistan Sunni Tehreek strongly opposed the appointment of Deobandis to important religious posts. Its branch in Lahore publicly declared its opposition to the appointment of a Deobandi cleric as khateeb of Badshahi Mosque, and other similar appointments.

=== Split into PST and ST and reunion ===
Due to internal disputes, Sunni Tehreek later split up into two main factions. Sarwat Ejaz Qadri, one of its main leader formed a much larger faction which was later named as Pakistan Sunni Tehreek (PST), while Ahmed Bilal Qadri (son of ST's founder Saleem Qadri) formed his own faction and his faction adapted its same old name. Both factions later announced merger in September 2023 with Ahmed Bilal Qadri appointed as party's secretary general and Sarwat Ejaz Qadri as party's president.

Ahead of the 2024 elections, the party was delisted by the Election Commission of Pakistan for failing to conduct intra-party elections and was not eligible to contest on any seat.

== Controversies ==
In May 2001, sectarian riots broke out after Sunni Tehreek leader Saleem Qadri was assassinated by Sipah-e-Muhammed Pakistan, a Shia Islamist, vigilante, militant, and assassin organization and network. His successor, Abbas Qadri, charged President Asif Ali Zardari with "patronising terrorists" and "standing between us and the murderers."

In April 2007, alleged Sunni Tehreek members opened gunfire on an Ahl-i Hadith mosque in Karachi. One worshiper was killed in the attack.
