= Pakistan Rah-e-Haq Party =

Political party in Pakistan

Pakistan Rah-e-Haq Party پاکستان راہِ حق پارٹی
- Abbreviation: PRHP
- President: Ibrahim Khan Qasmi
- Founder: Ibrahim Khan Qasmi
- Founded: 2012; 14 years ago
- Headquarters: Qasmi Public Secretariat, Mohalla Farooq-e-Azam, Landi Arbab, Peshawar
- Ideology: Islamism; Islamic fundamentalism; Religious conservatism
- Political position: Far-right
- Religion: Sunni Islam
- National affiliation: SSP; TTAP
- Colors
- Provincial Assembly of Punjab: 0 / 371

Election symbol
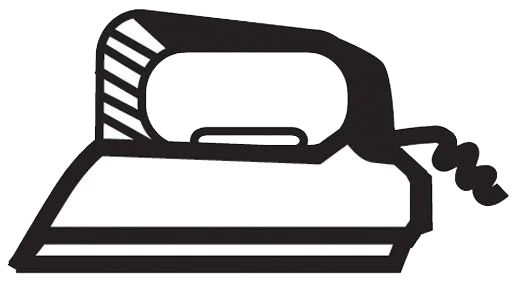
- Iron (Urdu: استری)

Party flag

Pakistan Rah-e-Haq Party (PRHP) (Urdu:پاکستان راہِ حق پارٹی) is an Islamist politico-religious party in Pakistan. It was founded by Ibrahim Khan Qasmi in February 2012.

== History ==
Hakeem Muhammad Ibrahim Qasmi, a former provincial leader of Sipah-e-Sahaba Pakistan, founded the PRHP in Peshawar in February 2012. Qasmi was elected as member of the then NWFP Assembly from then PF-4, a constituency of Peshawar in the 2002 Pakistani general election and after being elected he supported Muttahida Majlis-e-Amal, an electoral alliance of six religious parties.

== See also ==
- List of Deobandi organisations
- Sipah-e-Sahaba Pakistan
