= List of members of the 15th Provincial Assembly of Sindh =

This is the list of current members of the Provincial Assembly of Sindh elected following the 2018 provincial election.

The 15th Provincial Assembly was dissolved on 11 August 2023 by Governor Kamran Tessori, on the advice of Chief Minister Murad Ali Shah.

== Members ==
No.	Constituency	District	Party	Member	Assumed office
1	Jacobabad-I	Jacobabad	Pakistan Tehreek-e-Insaf	Muhammad Aslam Abro	13 August 2018
2	Jacobabad-II	Jacobabad	Pakistan Peoples Party	Sohrab Khan Sarki	13 August 2018
3	Jacobabad-III	Jacobabad	Pakistan Peoples Party	Mumtaz Hussain Khan	13 August 2018
4	Kashmore-I	Kashmore	Pakistan Peoples Party	Abdul Rauf Khoso	13 August 2018
5	Kashmore-II	Kashmore	Pakistan Peoples Party	Ghulam Abid Khan	13 August 2018
6	Kashmore-III	Kashmore	Pakistan Peoples Party	Mir Shabbir Bijarani	13 August 2018
7	Shikarpur-I	Shikarpur	Pakistan Peoples Party	Imtiaz Ahmed Shaikh	13 August 2018
8	Shikarpur-II	Shikarpur	Grand Democratic Alliance	Muhammad Shaharyar Khan Mahar	13 August 2018
9	Shikarpur-III	Shikarpur	Pakistan Peoples Party	Agha Siraj Durrani	13 August 2018
10	Larkana-I	Larkana	Pakistan Peoples Party	Faryal Talpur	13 August 2018
11	Larkana-II	Larkana	Grand Democratic Alliance	Moazzam Ali Khan	29 October 2019
12	Larkana-III	Larkana	Pakistan Peoples Party	Sohail Anwar Siyal	13 August 2018
13	Larkana-IV	Larkana	Pakistan Peoples Party	Hizbullah Bughio	13 August 2018
14	Qambar Shahdadkot-I	Qambar Shahadkot	Pakistan Peoples Party	Mir Nadir Ali Khan Magsi	13 August 2018
15	Qambar Shahdadkot-II	Qambar Shahadkot	Pakistan Peoples Party	Ghanwer Ali Khan Isran	13 August 2018
16	Qambar Shahdadkot-III	Qambar Shahadkot	Pakistan Peoples Party	Nawab Ghaibi Sardar Khan Chandio	13 August 2018
17	Qambar Shahdadkot-IV	Qambar Shahadkot	Pakistan Peoples Party	Burhan Chandio	13 August 2018
18	Ghotki-I	Ghotki	Pakistan Tehreek-e-Insaf	Shahar Yar Khan Shar	13 August 2018
19	Ghotki-II	Ghotki	Pakistan Peoples Party	Abdul Bari Pitafi	13 August 2018
20	Ghotki-III	Ghotki	Grand Democratic Alliance	Ali Gohar Khan Mahar	13 August 2018
21	Ghotki-IV	Ghotki	Pakistan Peoples Party	Ali Nawaz Khan Mehar	13 August 2018
22	Sukkur-I	Sukkur	Pakistan Peoples Party	Ikramullah Khan Dharejo	13 August 2018
23	Sukkur-II	Sukkur	Pakistan Peoples Party	Awais Qadir Shah	13 August 2018
24	Sukkur-III	Sukkur	Pakistan Peoples Party	Syed Farukh Ahmed Shah	13 August 2018
25	Sukkur-IV	Sukkur	Pakistan Peoples Party	Nasir Hussain Shah	13 August 2018
26	Khairpur-I	Khairpur	Pakistan Peoples Party	Qaim Ali Shah	13 August 2018
27	Khairpur-II	Khairpur	Pakistan Peoples Party	Munawar Ali Wassan	13 August 2018
28	Khairpur-III	Khairpur	Pakistan Peoples Party	Sajid Ali Banbhan	13 August 2018
29	Khairpur-IV	Khairpur	Grand Democratic Alliance	Muhammad Rafique	13 August 2018
30	Khairpur-V	Khairpur	Pakistan Peoples Party	Syed Ahmed Raza Shah Jeelani	22 October 2018
31	Khairpur-VI	Khairpur	Pakistan Peoples Party	Naeem Ahmed Kharal	13 August 2018
32	Khairpur-VII	Khairpur	Grand Democratic Alliance	Muhammad Rashid Shah	13 August 2018
33	Naushahro Feroze-I	Naushahro Feroze	Pakistan Peoples Party	Syed Serfraz Hussain Shah	13 August 2018
34	Naushahro Feroze-II	Naushahro Feroze	Pakistan Peoples Party	Syed Murad Ali Shah	13 August 2018
35	Naushahro Feroze-III	Naushahro Feroze	Pakistan Peoples Party	Mumtaz Ali Chandio	13 August 2018
36	Naushahro Feroze-IV	Naushahro Feroze	Grand Democratic Alliance	Arif Mustafa Jatoi	13 August 2018
37	Nawabshah-I	Nawabshah	Pakistan Peoples Party	Azra Fazal Pechuho	13 August 2018
38	Nawabshah-II	Nawabshah	Pakistan Peoples Party	Tariq Masood Arain	13 August 2018
39	Nawabshah-III	Nawabshah	Pakistan Peoples Party	Ghulam Qadir Chandio	13 August 2018
40	Nawabshah-IV	Nawabshah	Pakistan Peoples Party	Khan Muhammad Dahri	13 August 2018
41	Sanghar-I	Sanghar	Grand Democratic Alliance	Ali Ghulam Nizamani	13 August 2018
42	Sanghar-II	Sanghar	Grand Democratic Alliance	Qazi Shams-ud-Din Rajar	13 August 2018
43	Sanghar-III	Sanghar	Pakistan Peoples Party	Jam Shabbir Ali Khan	25 February 2021
44	Sanghar-IV	Sanghar	Pakistan Peoples Party	Faraz Dero	13 August 2018
45	Sanghar-V	Sanghar	Pakistan Peoples Party	Shahid Abdul Salam Thahim	13 August 2018
46	Sanghar-VI	Sanghar	Grand Democratic Alliance	Waryam Faqqeer	13 August 2018
47	Mirpur Khas-I	Mirpur Khas	Pakistan Peoples Party	Hari Ram Kishori Lal	13 August 2018
48	Mirpur Khas-II	Mirpur Khas	Pakistan Peoples Party	Syed Zulfiqar Ali Shah	15 August 2018
49	Mirpur Khas-III	Mirpur Khas	Pakistan Peoples Party	Noor Ahmed Bhurgri	13 August 2018
50	Mirpur Khas-IV	Mirpur Khas	Pakistan Peoples Party	Mir Tariq Ali Khan Talpur	13 August 2018
51	Umerkot-I	Umerkot	Pakistan Peoples Party	Syed Sardar Ali Shah	13 August 2018
52	Umerkot-II	Umerkot	Pakistan Peoples Party	Syed Ameer Ali Shah	18 January 2021
53	Umerkot-III	Umerkot	Pakistan Peoples Party	Nawab Muhammad Taimur Talpur	13 August 2018
54	Tharparkar-I	Tharparkar	Grand Democratic Alliance	Abdul Razzaque Rahimoon	16 August 2018
55	Tharparkar-II	Tharparkar	Pakistan Peoples Party	Muhammad Qasim Soomro	13 August 2018
56	Tharparkar-III	Tharparkar	Pakistan Peoples Party	Fakeer Sher Muhammad Bilalani	13 August 2018
57	Tharparkar-IV	Tharparkar	Pakistan Peoples Party	Arbab Lutfullah	13 August 2018
58	Matiari-I	Matiari	Pakistan Peoples Party	Makhdoom Mehboob Zaman	13 August 2018
59	Matiari-II	Matiari	Pakistan Peoples Party	Makhdoom Rafik Zaman	13 August 2018
60	Tando Allahyar-I	Tando Allahyar	Pakistan Peoples Party	Syed Zia Abbas Shah	13 August 2018
61	Tando Allahyar-II	Tando Allahyar	Pakistan Peoples Party	Imdad Ali Pitafi	13 August 2018
62	Hyderabad-I	Hyderabad	Pakistan Peoples Party	Jam Khan	13 August 2018
63	Hyderabad-II	Hyderabad	Pakistan Peoples Party	Sharjeel Inam Memon	13 August 2018
64	Hyderabad-III	Hyderabad	Pakistan Peoples Party	Abdul Jabbar Khan	13 August 2018
65	Hyderabad-IV	Hyderabad	Muttahida Qaumi Movement	Nadeem Ahmed Siddiqui	13 August 2018
66	Hyderabad-V	Hyderabad	Muttahida Qaumi Movement	Mohammad Rashid Khilji	13 August 2018
67	Hyderabad-VI	Hyderabad	Muttahida Qaumi Movement	Nasir Hussain Qureshi	13 August 2018
68	Tando Muhammad Khan-I	Tando Muhammad Khan	Pakistan Peoples Party	Syed Aijaz Hussain Shah	13 August 2018
69	Tando Muhammad Khan-II	Tando Muhammad Khan	Pakistan Peoples Party	Abdul Karim Soomro	13 August 2018
70	Badin-I	Badin	Pakistan Peoples Party	Muhammad Halepoto	31 May 2021
71	Badin-II	Badin	Pakistan Peoples Party	Allah Bux Talpur	13 August 2018
72	Badin-III	Badin	Grand Democratic Alliance	Hasnain Mirza	13 August 2018
73	Badin-IV	Badin	Pakistan Peoples Party	Taj Muhammad Mallah	13 August 2018
74	Badin-V	Badin	Pakistan Peoples Party	Muhammad Ismail Rahoo	13 August 2018
75	Sujawal-I	Sujawal	Pakistan Peoples Party	Shah Hussain Shah Sheerazi	13 August 2018
76	Sujawal-II	Sujawal	Pakistan Peoples Party	Muhammad Ali Malkani	13 August 2018
77	Thatta-I	Thatta	Pakistan Peoples Party	Riaz Hussain Shah Sheerazi	13 August 2018
78	Thatta-II	Thatta	Pakistan Peoples Party	Ali Hassan Zardari	13 August 2018
79	Thatta-III	Thatta	Pakistan Peoples Party	Jam Awais Bijar Khan Jokhio	13 August 2018
80	Jamshoro-I	Jamshoro	Pakistan Peoples Party	Syed Murad Ali Shah	13 August 2018
81	Jamshoro-II	Jamshoro	Pakistan Peoples Party	Giyanoo Mal	13 August 2018
82	Jamshoro-III	Jamshoro	Pakistan Peoples Party	Asad Sikandar	13 August 2018
83	Dadu-I	Dadu	Pakistan Peoples Party	Abdul Aziz Junejo	13 August 2018
84	Dadu-II	Dadu	Pakistan Peoples Party	Fayaz Ali Butt	13 August 2018
85	Dadu-III	Dadu	Pakistan Peoples Party	Pir Mujeeb ul Haq	13 August 2018
86	Dadu-IV	Dadu	Pakistan Peoples Party	Syed Salah Shah Jillani	14 November 2019
87	Malir-I	Malir	Pakistan Peoples Party	Muhammad Sajid Jokhio	13 August 2018
88	Malir-II	Malir	Pakistan Peoples Party	Muhammad Yousuf Baloch	25 February 2021
89	Malir-III	Malir	Pakistan Peoples Party	Muhammad Saleem Baloch	13 August 2018
90	Malir-IV	Malir	Pakistan Peoples Party	Abdul Razak Raja	13 August 2018
91	Malir-V	Malir	Pakistan Peoples Party	Mehmood Alam Jamot	13 August 2018
92	Korangi Karachi-I	Korangi Karachi	Muttahida Qaumi Movement	Muhammad Hussain Khan	13 August 2018
93	Korangi Karachi-II	Korangi Karachi	Muttahida Qaumi Movement	Hamid Zafar	13 August 2018
94	Korangi Karachi-III	Korangi Karachi	Muttahida Qaumi Movement	Syed Hashim Raza Jilani	7 February 2019
95	Korangi Karachi-IV	Korangi Karachi	Muttahida Qaumi Movement	Muhammad Javed Hanif Khan	13 August 2018
96	Korangi Karachi-V	Korangi Karachi	Muttahida Qaumi Movement	Ghulam Jellani	13 August 2018
97	Korangi Karachi-VI	Korangi Karachi	Pakistan Tehreek-e-Insaf	Raja Azhar Khan	13 August 2018
98	Korangi Karachi-VII	Korangi Karachi	Pakistan Tehreek-e-Insaf	Adeel Ahmed	13 August 2018
99	Karachi East-I	Karachi East	Pakistan Tehreek-e-Insaf	Haleem Adil Sheikh	13 August 2018
100	Karachi East-II	Karachi East	Pakistan Tehreek-e-Insaf	Kareem Bux Gabol	13 August 2018
101	Karachi East-III	Karachi East	Pakistan Tehreek-e-Insaf	Syed Firdous Shamim Naqvi	13 August 2018
102	Karachi East-IV	Karachi East	Pakistan Tehreek-e-Insaf	Arsalan Taj Hussain	13 August 2018
103	Karachi East-V	Karachi East	Pakistan Tehreek-e-Insaf	Bilal Ahmed Ghaffar	13 August 2018
104	Karachi East-VI	Karachi East	Pakistan Peoples Party	Saeed Ghani	13 August 2018
105	Karachi East-VII	Karachi East	Pakistan Tehreek-e-Insaf	Muhammad Ali Aziz	13 August 2018
106	Karachi East-VIII	Karachi East	Pakistan Tehreek-e-Insaf	Jamal Uddin Siddiqui	13 August 2018
107	Karachi South-I	Karachi South	Tehreek-e-Labbaik Pakistan	Muhammad Younus Soomro	13 August 2018
108	Karachi South-II	Karachi South	Jamaat-e-Islami Pakistan	Syed Abdul Rasheed	13 August 2018
109	Karachi South-III	Karachi South	Pakistan Tehreek-e-Insaf	Ramzan Ghanchi	13 August 2018
110	Karachi South-IV	Karachi South	Pakistan Tehreek-e-Insaf	Khurrum Sher Zaman	13 August 2018
111	Karachi South-V	Karachi South	Pakistan Tehreek-e-Insaf	Shahzad Qureshi	22 October 2018
112	Karachi West-I	Karachi West	Pakistan Peoples Party	Liaquat Ali Askani	13 August 2018
113	Karachi West-II	Karachi West	Pakistan Tehreek-e-Insaf	Shah Nawaz Jadoon	13 August 2018
114	Karachi West-III	Karachi West	Pakistan Tehreek-e-Insaf	Muhammad Shabbir Qureshi	13 August 2018
115	Karachi West-IV	Karachi West	Tehreek-e-Labbaik Pakistan	Mufti Muhammad Qasim	13 August 2018
116	Karachi West-V	Karachi West	Pakistan Tehreek-e-Insaf	Malik Shehzad Awan	13 August 2018
117	Karachi West-VI	Karachi West	Muttahida Qaumi Movement	Sadaqat Hussain	13 August 2018
118	Karachi West-VII	Karachi West	Muttahida Qaumi Movement	Adeel Shahzad	13 August 2018
119	Karachi West-VIII	Karachi West	Muttahida Qaumi Movement	Ali Khursheedi	13 August 2018
120	Karachi West-IX	Karachi West	Pakistan Tehreek-e-Insaf	Saeed Ahmad Afridi	13 August 2018
121	Karachi West-X	Karachi West	Muttahida Qaumi Movement	Basit Ahmed Siddiqui	13 August 2018
122	Karachi West-XI	Karachi West	Pakistan Tehreek-e-Insaf	Rabistan Khan	13 August 2018
123	Karachi Central-I	Karachi Central	Muttahida Qaumi Movement	Waseemuddin Qureshi	13 August 2018
124	Karachi Central-II	Karachi Central	Muttahida Qaumi Movement	Khawaja Izharul Hassan	13 August 2018
125	Karachi Central-III	Karachi Central	Pakistan Tehreek-e-Insaf	Abbas Jafri	13 August 2018
126	Karachi Central-IV	Karachi Central	Pakistan Tehreek-e-Insaf	Omar Omari	13 August 2018
127	Karachi Central-V	Karachi Central	Muttahida Qaumi Movement	Kunwar Naveed Jamil	13 August 2018
128	Karachi Central-VI	Karachi Central	Muttahida Qaumi Movement	Muhammad Abbas Jafri	13 August 2018
129	Karachi Central-VII	Karachi Central	Pakistan Tehreek-e-Insaf	Syed Imran Ali Shah	13 August 2018
130	Karachi Central-VIII	Karachi Central	Pakistan Tehreek-e-Insaf	Muhammad Riaz Haider	13 August 2018
131	Reserved for Women		Pakistan Peoples Party	Shehla Raza	13 August 2018
132	Reserved for Women		Pakistan Peoples Party	Shaheena Sher Ali	13 August 2018
133	Reserved for Women		Pakistan Peoples Party	Rehana Leghari	13 August 2018
134	Reserved for Women		Pakistan Peoples Party	Hina Dastagir	13 August 2018
135	Reserved for Women		Pakistan Peoples Party	Sadia Javed	13 August 2018
136	Reserved for Women		Pakistan Peoples Party	Nida Khuhro	13 August 2018
137	Reserved for Women		Pakistan Peoples Party	Shazia Umar	13 August 2018
138	Reserved for Women		Pakistan Peoples Party	Ghazala Siyal	13 August 2018
139	Reserved for Women		Pakistan Peoples Party	Shamim Mumtaz	13 August 2018
140	Reserved for Women		Pakistan Peoples Party	Farhat Seemi	13 August 2018
141	Reserved for Women		Pakistan Peoples Party	Tanzila Ume Habiba Qambrani	13 August 2018
142	Reserved for Women		Pakistan Peoples Party	Sajeela Leghari	13 August 2018
143	Reserved for Women		Pakistan Peoples Party	Sharmil Faruqui	3 June 2020
144	Reserved for Women		Pakistan Peoples Party	Syeda Marvi Faseeh	13 August 2018
145	Reserved for Women		Pakistan Peoples Party	Heer Soho	13 August 2018
146	Reserved for Women		Pakistan Peoples Party	Kulsoom Akhtar Chandio	13 August 2018
147	Reserved for Women		Pakistan Peoples Party	Parveen Bashir Qaimkhani	13 August 2018
148	Reserved for Women		Pakistan Tehreek-e-Insaf	Sidra Imran	13 August 2018
149	Reserved for Women		Pakistan Tehreek-e-Insaf	Seema Zia	13 August 2018
150	Reserved for Women		Pakistan Tehreek-e-Insaf	Rabia Azfar Nizami	13 August 2018
151	Reserved for Women		Pakistan Tehreek-e-Insaf	Dua Bhutto	13 August 2018
152	Reserved for Women		Pakistan Tehreek-e-Insaf	Adeeba Hassan	13 August 2018
153	Reserved for Women		Muttahida Qaumi Movement	Mangla Sharma	13 August 2018
154	Reserved for Women		Muttahida Qaumi Movement	Rana Ansar	13 August 2018
155	Reserved for Women		Muttahida Qaumi Movement	Shahana Ashar	13 August 2018
156	Reserved for Women		Muttahida Qaumi Movement	Rabia Khatoon	13 August 2018
157	Reserved for Women		Grand Democratic Alliance	Nusrat Seher Abbasi	13 August 2018
158	Reserved for Women		Grand Democratic Alliance	Naseem Rajpar	13 August 2018
159	Reserved for Women		Tehreek-e-Labbaik Pakistan	Sarwat Fatima	13 August 2018
160	Reserved for Non-Muslims		Pakistan Peoples Party	Rana Hamir Singh	13 August 2018
161	Reserved for Non-Muslims		Pakistan Peoples Party	Mukesh Kumar Chawla	13 August 2018
162	Reserved for Non-Muslims		Pakistan Peoples Party	Lal Chand Ukrani	13 August 2018
163	Reserved for Non-Muslims		Pakistan Peoples Party	Anthony Naveed	13 August 2018
164	Reserved for Non-Muslims		Pakistan Peoples Party	Surendar Valasai	13 August 2018
165	Reserved for Non-Muslims		Pakistan Tehreek-e-Insaf	Sanjay Gangwani	13 August 2018
166	Reserved for Non-Muslims		Pakistan Tehreek-e-Insaf	Sachanand	13 August 2018
167	Reserved for Non-Muslims		Muttahida Qaumi Movement	Sanjay Perwani	13 August 2018
168	Reserved for Non-Muslims		Grand Democratic Alliance	Nand Kumar	13 August 2018

== Former members ==
- Imran Ismail (oath 13 August 2018), resigned to become Governor
- Muhammad Wajahat (oath 13 August 2018), died on 28 November 2018
- Ghulam Shah Jeelani (oath 13 August 2018), died on 13 September 2019
- Ali Mardan Shah (oath 13 August 2018), died on 19 January 2020
