= 2024 Sindh provincial election =

Pakistani provincial election

- 8 February 2024

130 out of 168 seats in the Sindh Assembly (Note: 29 seats are reserved for women and 9 are reserved for non-Muslims filled through Proportional representation) 85 seats needed for a majority
- Registered: 26,994,769
- Turnout: 43.7% (▼4.41%)
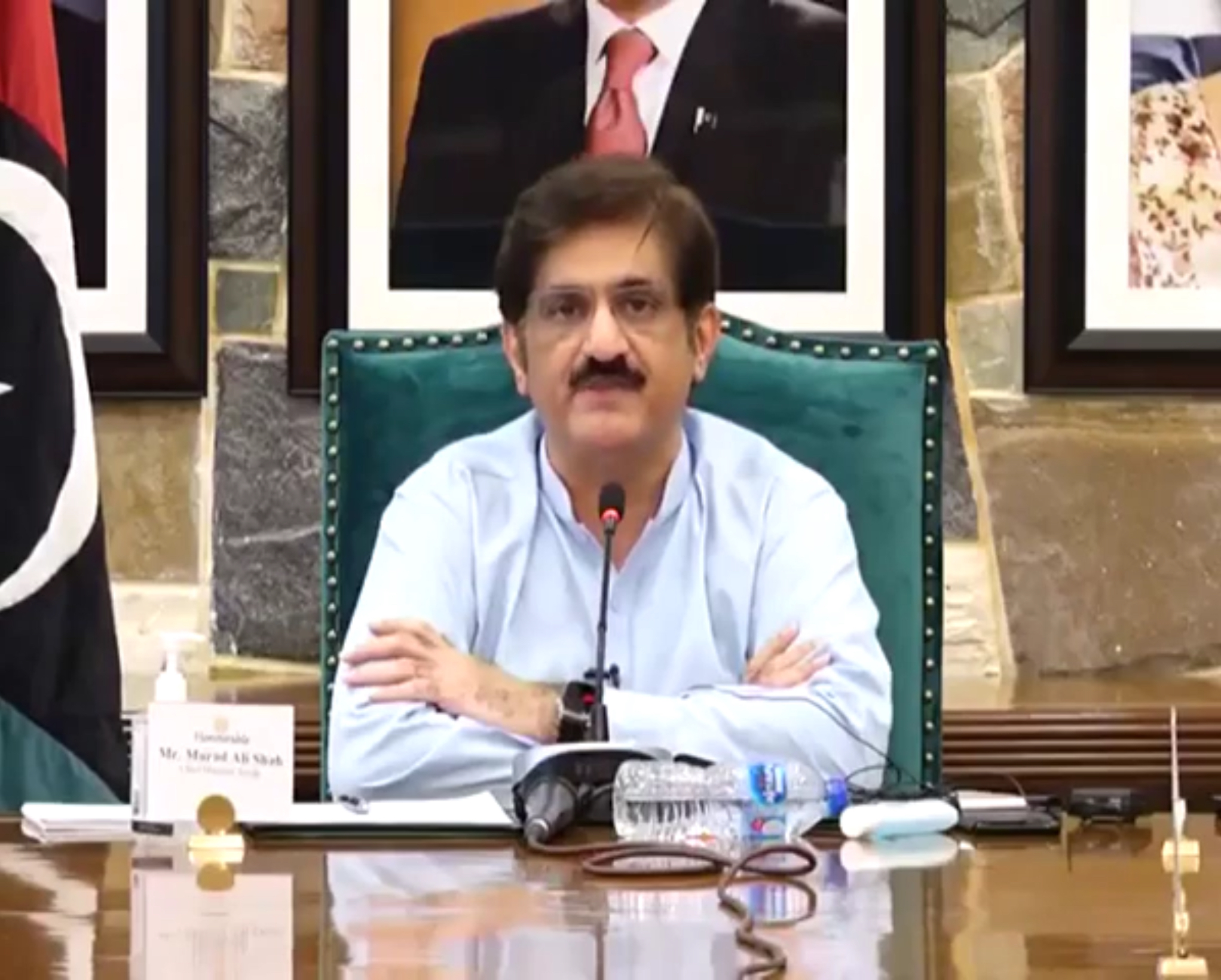
	First party	Second party	Third party
Leader	Murad Ali Shah	Ali Khursheedi	Ali Palh
Party	PPP	MQM-P	IND (backed by PTI)
Leader since	29 July 2016	-	-
Leader's seat	Jamshoro-I	Karachi West-IV	Karachi East-VII (lost)
Last election	38.44%, 99 Seats	7.65%, 20 seats	14.47%
Seats before	99	21	30
Seats won	115	36	12
Seat change	▲16	▲15	▼18
Popular vote	5,228,678	905,896	1,105,243
Percentage	46.11%	7.99%	9.75%
Swing	▲7.77pp	▲0.34pp	▼4.72pp
- Map of Sindh with Provincial Assembly constituencies
Chief Minister before election
Murad Ali Shah
PPP
Elected Chief Minister
Murad Ali Shah
PPP

Provincial elections were held in Sindh on 8 February 2024 to elect a new provincial legislature. On 5 August 2023, after the approval of the results of the 2023 digital census by the Council of Common Interests headed by Prime Minister Shehbaz Sharif, elections have been delayed for several months, as new delimitations will be published on 14 December 2023. On 2 November 2023, the Election Commission of Pakistan announced, in agreement with the President of Pakistan, Arif Alvi, that the elections should be held on 8 February 2024. This election was held concurrently with nationwide general elections and other provincial elections.

== Background ==
In the 2018 election, the Pakistan People's Party (PPP) won 99 seats, gaining a majority in the Provincial Assembly. It became the third consecutive time that the PPP was able to form government in Sindh Since 2008.

The Pakistan Tehreek-e-Insaf (PTI) became the largest party in Karachi by winning 21 out of 44 seats from the city. It was the first time since 1988 that any party other than the MQM-P got the mandate to represent the city on the provincial and national levels. Overall, the PTI won 30 seats and became the second largest party, and the largest party in the opposition.

The Muttahida Qaumi Movement - Pakistan (MQM-P), which was the largest and most popular party in Karachi, Hyderabad and other urban areas of Sindh, faced a tough challenge from the rising popularity of the PTI and received its worst ever result. It won only 21 seats and became the third largest party in the province. The MQM-P also opted to join the opposition.

In April 2022, after circumstances arising during a political crisis in Pakistan after the successful no-confidence motion against Prime Minister Imran Khan, the MQM-P left the opposition and joined the PPP-led provincial government.

In September 2022, Former Prime Minister and Leader of Pakistan Tehreek-e-Insaf Imran Khan announced to liberate Sindh from Zardari Mafia. He stated that Pakistan Tehreek-e-Insaf will team up with the youth to liberate the poor and oppressed people of Interior Sindh from Feudal lords of Pakistan People's Party. This was the very first time some party leader threatened dominance of People's Party in Sindh and upcoming election will be a battle for survival of PPP in interior Sindh as Pakistan Tehreek-e-Insaf has support of the people of Karachi and Hyderabad and will be able to gain seats in Interior Sindh if they campaign well.

=== Merger of MQM factions ===
Since the appointment of Kamran Tessori as the Governor of Sindh, efforts began to merge breakaway factions of the MQM-P like the Pak Sarzameen Party (PSP) and the Farooq Sattar group back into the MQM-P to unite their vote bank to overcome the growing popularity of Pakistan Tehreek-e-Insaf (PTI). The Mohajir Qaumi Movement Pakistan - Haqiqi (MQM-H) was also approached, but refused to merge with the MQM-P.

On the evening of 12 January 2023 Syed Mustafa Kamal, the leader of the PSP, and Farooq Sattar announced their merger with the MQM-P in a press conference.

=== Ban on PTI from contesting as a party ===
On 22 December 2023, the Election Commission of Pakistan (ECP) decided against letting the PTI retain its electoral symbol, arguing that the party had failed to hold intra-party elections. On 22 December, the PTI approached the Peshawar High Court (PHC) against the ECP's order and hence, a single-member bench suspended the ECP's order until 9 January 2024. On 30 December 2023, the ECP filed a review application within the PHC, and days later, a two-member bench withdrew the suspension order as it heard the case. However, on 10 January 2024, the two-member bench had declared the ECP's order to be "illegal, without any lawful authority, and of no legal effect. On 11 January, the ECP challenged this ruling in the Supreme Court, and on 13 January, a three-member bench ruled in favor of the ECP and stripped the PTI of its electoral symbol. As a consequence of this ruling, the PTI could not allot party tickets to any of its candidates. Therefore, all candidates of the party will be listed as independent candidates and each will have a different electoral symbol.

== Schedule ==
The schedule of the election was announced by the Election Commission of Pakistan on 15 December 2023.

Sr no	Poll Event	Schedule
1	Public Notice Issued by the Returning Officers	19 December 2023
2	Dates of filing Nomination papers with the Returning Officers by the candidates	20 December 2023 to 24 December 2023
3	Publication of names of the nominated candidates.	24 December 2023
4	Last date of scrutiny of nomination papers by the Returning Officer	25 December 2023 to 30 December 2023
5	Last date of filing appeals against decisions of the Returning Officer rejecting/accepting nomination papers.	3 January 2024
6	Last date for deciding of appeals by the Appellate Tribunal	10 January 2024
7	Publication of revised list of candidates	11 January 2024
8	Last date of withdrawal of candidate and publication of revised list of candidates	12 January 2024
9	Allotment of election symbol to contesting candidates	13 January 2024
10	Date of Polling and Counting of Votes	8 February 2024

== Electoral system ==
The 168 seats of the Sindh Assembly consist of 130 general seats, whose members are elected by the first-past-the-post voting system through single-member constituencies. 29 seats are reserved for women and 9 seats are reserved for non-Muslims. The members on these seats are elected through proportional representation based on the total number of general seats secured by each political party.

== Opinion polls ==
Polling firm	Last date of polling	Link	PPP	PTI	MQM(P)	PML-N	MMA	Other	Ind.	Lead	Sample size	Undecideds & Non-voters (Note: This is a column that lists the percentage of undecided voters and non-voters in certain polls that publish this data. As some polls do not publish any data whatsoever on undecided voters and non-voters, the columns with survey participants that had a preference when polled are all that is needed to reach 100%. In surveys that do include data on non-voters and undecided voters, a scaling factor is applied to the margin of error and the rest of the data (for example, if the number of undecideds and non-voters equals 20%, each party would have their vote share scaled up by a factor of 100/80 (the formula is 100/(100-UndecidedPercentage)). This is done to keep consistency between the different polls and the different types data they provide.)
PA	11 August 2023	The Provincial Assembly is dissolved by Governor Kamran Tessori on the advice of Chief Minister Murad Ali Shah.										
Gallup Pakistan	30 June 2023	PDF	35%	36%	2%	3%	1%	23%		1%	3,500	N/A (Note: This poll or crosstabulation did not include any data about undecided voters or non-voters and cut them out completely from the published results.)
NA	11–12 April 2022	Imran Khan is removed from office in a no-confidence motion										
IPOR (IRI)	21 March 2022	PDF	44%	17%	5%	7%	27%			27%	~810	N/A
Gallup Pakistan	31 January 2022	PDF	21%	18%	2%	9%	3%	33%	1%	3%	~1,300	13%
IPOR (IRI)	9 January 2022	PDF	44%	13%	7%	3%	33%			31%	867	N/A
IPOR (IRI)	11 November 2020	PDF	22%	13%	1%	9%	3%	52%		9%	467	N/A
2018 Elections	25 July 2018	ECP	38.4%	14.5%	7.7%	2.0%	6.0%	24.0%	7.4%	23.6%	10,025,437	N/A
Directly elected seats			76	23	16	0	1	_{GDA 11 TLP 2}	1 post.	53	_{Women: 29 / non-Muslims: 9 Total =168 seats}	
ECP 2024 Gen.Elections delimitations for Sindh PA seats: 130 directly elected + 29 women + 9 non-Muslims = 168

== Results ==
=== Result by party ===
Party	Popular vote			Seats							
Party	Popular vote			General				Reserved		Total	+/−
Party	Votes	%	±pp	Contested	Won	Independents joined	Total	Women	Non-Muslims	Total	+/−
PPP	5,228,678	46.11	▲7.77	130	85	4	89	20	6	115	▲16
MQM-P	905,896	7.99	▲0.34	88	28	0	28	6	2	36	▲15
PTI	1,105,243	9.75	▼4.72	113	10	9			12	▼18	
GDA	1,399,137	12.34	▼2.77	75	2	0	2	1	0	3	▼11
JIP	708,413	6.25	N/A	102	2	0	2	0	0	2	▲1
TLP	329,715	2.91	▼1.60	119	0	0	0	0	0	0	▼3
PMLN	188,473	1.66	▼0.34	51	0	0	0	0	0	0	Steady
IPP	4951	0.04	N/A	28	0	0	0	0	0	0	Steady
MQM-L	103,592	0.91	N/A	54	0	0	0			0	Steady
PRHP	921,159	8.12	▼2.09	0	3	−3	0			0	Steady
IND	921,159	8.12	▼2.09	0	0	0	0			0	Steady
Total	11,338,919	100%			130			29	9	168	
Valid votes	11,338,919										
Invalid votes											
Votes cast/ turnout											
Abstentions											
Registered voters	26,994,769										
Source: Election Commission of Pakistan

=== Results by region ===
Region	Seats	PPP	MQM-P	PTI (Note: Backed by the Pakistan Tehreek-e-Insaf)	JIP	GDA	IND	Others
Upper Sindh	44	39	0	0	0	2	3	0
Lower Sindh	39	35	3	1	0	0	0	0
Karachi	47	11	25	9	2	0	0	0
Total	130	85	28	10	2	2	3	0

=== Results by division ===
Division	Total seats	PPP	MQM-P	PTI	JIP	GDA	IND	Others
Larkana	17	16	0	0	0	0	1	0
Sukkur	14	11	0	0	0	1	2	0
Nawabshah	13	12	0	0	0	1	0	0
Mirpur Khas	11	11	0	0	0	0	0	0
Hyderabad	28	24	3	1	0	0	0	
Karachi	47	11	25	9	2	0	0	0
Total	130	85	28	10	2	2	3	0

=== Results by district ===
Division	District	Seats	PPP	MQM-P	PTI	JIP	GDA	IND	Others
Larkana	Jacobabad	3	2	0	0	0	0	1	0
Larkana	Kashmore	3	3	0	0	0	0	0	0
Larkana	Shikarpur	3	3	0	0	0	0	0	0
Larkana	Larkana	4	4	0	0	0	0	0	0
Larkana	Qambar Shahdadkot	4	4	0	0	0	0	0	0
Sukkur	Ghotki	4	2	0	0	0	0	2	0
Sukkur	Sukkur	4	4	0	0	0	0	0	0
Sukkur	Khairpur	6	5	0	0	0	1	0	0
Nawabshah	Naushahro Feroz	4	4	0	0	0	0	0	0
Nawabshah	Nawabshah	4	4	0	0	0	0	0	0
Nawabshah	Sanghar	5	4	0	0	0	1	0	0
Mirpur Khas	Mirpur Khas	4	4	0	0	0	0	0	0
Mirpur Khas	Umerkot	3	3	0	0	0	0	0	0
Mirpur Khas	Tharparkar	4	4	0	0	0	0	0	0
Hyderabad	Matiari	2	2	0	0	0	0	0	0
Hyderabad	Tando Allahyar	2	2	0	0	0	0	0	0
Hyderabad	Hyderabad	6	2	3	1	0	0	0	0
Hyderabad	Tando Muhammad Khan	2	2	0	0	0	0	0	0
Hyderabad	Jamshoro	3	3	0	0	0	0	0	0
Hyderabad	Dadu	4	4	0	0	0	0	0	0
Hyderabad	Badin	5	5	0	0	0	0	0	0
Hyderabad	Sujawal	2	2	0	0	0	0	0	0
Hyderabad	Thatta	2	2	0	0	0	0	0	0
Karachi	Malir	6	5	0	1	0	0	0	0
Karachi	Korangi	7	1	2	3	1	0	0	0
Karachi	East	9	1	8	0	0	0	0	0
Karachi	South	5	1	1	3	0	0	0	0
Karachi	Keamari	5	2	1	2	0	0	0	0
Karachi	West	6	1	5	0	0	0	0	0
Karachi	Central	9	0	8	0	1	0	0	0
Total		130	85	28	10	2	2	3	0

=== Results by constituency ===
District	Constituency		Winner				Runner Up				Margin	Turnout %
District	No.	Name	Candidate	Party	Votes	%	Candidate	Party	Votes	%	Margin	Turnout %
Jacobabad	1	Jacobabad-I	Sher Muhammad Khan Mugheri	PPP	48,242	63.44	Abdul Razzaque Khan	IND	18,130	23.84	30,112	37.18
Jacobabad	2	Jacobabad-II	Sohrab Khan Sarki	PPP	52,630	49.77	Shafique Ahmed Khoso	JUI(F)	48,896	46.24	3,734	60.76
Jacobabad	3	Jacobabad-III	Mumtaz Hussain Khan	IND	40,106	53.10	Mir Aurang Zaib Panhwar	PPP	31,432	41.61	8,674	42.18
Kashmore	4	Kashmore-I	Abdul Rauf Khoso	PPP	58,046	64.35	Mir Ghalib Hussain Khan	IND	25,758	28.56	32,288	49.75
Kashmore	5	Kashmore-II	Ghulam Abid Khan	PPP	31,132	47.03	Rabnawaz	JUI(F)	21,052	31.80	10,080	35.15
Kashmore	6	Kashmore-III	Mir Mehboob Ali Khan Bijarani	PPP	86,365	85.28	Abdul Qayoom	JUI(F)	9,945	9.82	76,420	55.26
Shikarpur	7	Shikarpur-I	Imtiaz Ahmed Shaikh	PPP	61,874	53.76	Agha Taimor Khan	JUI(F)	45,048	39.14	16,826	44.82
Shikarpur	8	Shikarpur-II	Muhammad Arif Khan Mahar	PPP	64,016	54.33	Abid Hussain Jatoi	JUI(F)	51,869	44.02	12,147	62.97
Shikarpur	9	Shikarpur-III	Agha Siraj Khan Durrani	PPP	63,760	64.86	Rushdullah Shah	JUI(F)	25,634	26.07	38,126	39.04
Larkana	10	Larkana-I	Faryal Talpur	PPP	85,920	75.98	Kifayatullah	JUI(F)	18,477	16.34	67,443	47.93
Larkana	11	Larkana-II	Jameel Ahmed Soomro	PPP	41,441	60.28	Kazim Ali Khan	GDA	20,871	30.36	20,570	36.92
Larkana	12	Larkana-III	Sohail Anwar Siyal	PPP	54,077	59.78	Moazam Ali Khan Abbasi	GDA	31,850	35.21	22,227	46.96
Larkana	13	Larkana-IV	Adil Altaf Unnar	PPP	89,662	91.72	Naseer Muhammad	JUI(F)	4,028	4.12	85,634	44.64
Qambar Shahdadkot	14	Qambar Shahdadkot-I	Mir Nadir Ali Khan Magsi	PPP	38,473	58.27	Muzafar Ali Brohi	GDA	20,422	30.93	18,051	33.58
Qambar Shahdadkot	15	Qambar Shahdadkot-II	Nisar Ahmed Khuhro	PPP	44,810	64.77	Mir Humayun Khan	PML(N)	17,211	24.88	27,599	35.81
Qambar Shahdadkot	16	Qambar Shahdadkot-III	Nawab Ghaibi Sardar Khan Chandio	PPP	38,057	67.54	Muhammad Ali Hakro	IND	12,581	22.33	25,476	29.98
Qambar Shahdadkot	17	Qambar Shahdadkot-IV	Burhan Chandio	PPP	43,885	62.76	Javed Hussain Khokhar	GDA	21,658	30.97	22,227	62.76
Ghotki	18	Ghotki-I	Jam Mehtab Hussain Dahar	IND	57,143	44.99	Shehryar Khan Shar	PPP	55,190	43.45	1,953	60.19
Ghotki	19	Ghotki-II	Sardar Nadir Akmal Khan Leghari	IND	56,429	50.61	Abdul Bari Pitafi	PPP	44,197	39.64	11,497	51.11
Ghotki	20	Ghotki-III	Muhammad Bux Khan Mahar	PPP	87,743	83.99	Mohammad Ishaq Laghari	JUI(F)	9,403	9.00	78,030	47.64
Ghotki	21	Ghotki-IV	Ali Nawaz Khan Mahar	PPP	63,758	63.39	Ghulam Ali Abbas	GDA	29,273	29.10	34,485	46.32
Sukkur	22	Sukkur-I	Ikramullah Khan	PPP	41,828	49.06	Muhammad Mubeen	JUI(F)	40,035	46.96	2,050	48.78
Sukkur	23	Sukkur-II	Awais Qadir Shah	PPP	69,268	72.14	Inayatullah	GDA	21,137	22.01	48,131	52.15
Sukkur	24	Sukkur-III	Syed Farukh Ahmed Shah	PPP	41,235	54.27	Mubeen Ahmed	IND	19,623	25.83	21,612	36.82
Sukkur	25	Sukkur-IV	Nasir Hussain Shah	PPP	51,798	53.20	Ameer Bux Alias Meer	JUI(F)	25,046	25.73	26,752	41.69
Khairpur	26	Khairpur-I	Syed Qaim Ali Shah	PPP	63,686	68.06	Imam Bux Phulpoto	GDA	19,041	20.35	44,645	43.95
Khairpur	27	Khairpur-II	Hallar Wassan	PPP	93,337	87.20	Muhammad Sharif Buriro	JUI(F)	10,734	10.03	82,603	48.33
Khairpur	28	Khairpur-III	Sajid Ali Banbhan	PPP	59,219	51.35	Ismail Shah	GDA	54,850	47.57	4,369	57.33
Khairpur	29	Khairpur-IV	Shiraz Shaukat Rajpar	PPP	69,590	58.69	Muhammad Rafique Banbhan	GDA	45,734	38.57	23,856	56.72
Khairpur	30	Khairpur-V	Naeem Ahmed Kharal	PPP	57,004	60.85	Shaikh Khalid Hussain	GDA	26,913	28.73	30,091	39.72
Khairpur	31	Khairpur-VI	Muhammad Rashid Shah	GDA	58,091	50.78	Muhammad Bachal Shah	PPP	51,769	45.26	6,322	46.85
Naushahro Feroze	32	Naushahro Feroze-I	Syed Serfraz Hussain Shah	PPP	60,339	59.23	Syed Zohaib Ali Shah	GDA	28,604	28.08	31,735	46.37
Naushahro Feroze	33	Naushahro Feroze-II	Syed Hassan Ali Shah	PPP	61,926	54.64	Shakeel Ahmed Jalbani	GDA	28,419	25.08	33,507	46.89
Naushahro Feroze	34	Naushahro Feroze-III	Mumtaz Ali Chandio	PPP	52,385	49.03	Shahnawaz Jatoi	GDA	46,442	43.47	5,943	46.77
Naushahro Feroze	35	Naushahro Feroze-IV	Zia Ul Hassan Lanjar	PPP	81,818	70.63	Masroor Ahmed Khan Jatoi	GDA	29,614	25.57	52,204	53.10
Nawabshah	36	Nawabshah-I	Azra Fazal Pechuho	PPP	75,485	73.89	Mir Bahawal Khan Rind	IND	16,659	16.31	58,826	44.60
Nawabshah	37	Nawabshah-II	Chaudhary Javed Iqbal Arain	PPP	70,799	62.11	Inayat Ali Rind	IND	20,300	17.81	50,499	45.12
Nawabshah	38	Nawabshah-III	Ghulam Qadir Chandio	PPP	66,176	57.48	Syed Zain Ul Abdin	GDA	40,488	35.17	25,688	55.66
Nawabshah	39	Nawabshah-IV	Bahadur Khan Dahri	PPP	70,134	75.14	Arif Niaz Arain	GDA	15,111	16.19	55,023	46.62
Sanghar	40	Sanghar-I	Ghulam Dastageer Rajar	GDA	56,400	48.29	Naveed Dero	PPP	52,988	45.37	3,412	51.17
Sanghar	41	Sanghar-II	Ali Hassan Hingorjo	PPP	64,496	49.40	Qazi Shams Din	GDA	62,708	48.03	1,788	55.50
Sanghar	42	Sanghar-III	Jam Shabbir Ali Khan	PPP	58,748	53.15	Jam Nafees Ali Khan	GDA	48,078	43.50	10,670	51.70
Sanghar	43	Sanghar-IV	Sardar Paras Dero	PPP	68,432	65.44	Niaz Hussain	GDA	23,891	22.85	44,541	43.17
Sanghar	44	Sanghar-V	Shahid Abdul Salam Thahim	PPP	60,411	51.89	Muhamamd Bux	GDA	49,144	42.21	11,267	48.35
Mirpur Khas	45	Mirpur Khas-I	Hari Ram	PPP	33,199	34.97	Dr Zafar Ahmed Khan	MQM(P)	20,099	21.17	13,100	40.83
Mirpur Khas	46	Mirpur Khas-II	Syed Zulfiqar Ali Shah	PPP	51,656	60.11	Shuja Muhammad Shah	IND	30,096	35.02	21,560	47.19
Mirpur Khas	47	Mirpur Khas-III	Noor Ahmed Bhurgri	PPP	56,812	58.13	Faisal kachelo	IND	17,441	17.84	39,371	46.06
Mirpur Khas	48	Mirpur Khas-IV	Mir Tariq Ali Khan Talpur	PPP	66,115	67.72	Inayatullah	GDA	15,638	16.02	50,477	49.30
Umerkot	49	Umerkot-I	Syed Sardar Ali Shah	PPP	52,286	56.24	Khizar Hayat	GDA	24,563	26.42	27,723	47.09
Umerkot	50	Umerkot-II	Syed Ameer Ali Shah	PPP	75,760	64.96	Fakir Ghulam Nabi Mangrio	GDA	14,743	16.19	47,409	59.11
Umerkot	51	Umerkot-III	Nawab Muhammad Taimur Talpur	PPP	60,518	63.26	Dr. Dost Muhammad Memon	GDA	27,752	29.01	32,766	48.77
Tharparkar	52	Tharparkar-I	Dost Muhammad	PPP	70,429	80.37	Sher Khan	GDA	15,853	18.09	54,576	74.20
Tharparkar	53	Tharparkar-II	Muhammad Qasim Soomro	PPP	74,982	61.89	Arbab Anwar Jabbar	GDA	41,320	34.11	33,662	67.96
Tharparkar	54	Tharparkar-III	Fakeer Sher Muhammad Bilalani	PPP	70,272	54.48	Arbab Togachi Fawad Razzaq	GDA	34,469	26.72	35,803	69.20
Tharparkar	55	Tharparkar-IV	Arbab Lutfullah	PPP	108,463	77.82	Arbab Zakaullah	GDA	17,768	12.75	90,965	66.34
Matiari	56	Matiari-I	Makhdoom Mehboob Zaman	PPP	72,178	62.54	Naseer Ahmed	PML(N)	35,525	30.78	36,653	54.77
Matiari	57	Matiari-II	Makhdoom Fakhar Zaman	PPP	52,175	51.38	Syed Jalal Shah	GDA	46,016	45.32	6,159	52.80
Tando Allahyar	58	Tando Allahyar-I	Syed Zia Abbas Shah	PPP	57,606	50.97	Rahila Magsi	GDA	42,587	37.68	15,019	48.47
Tando Allahyar	59	Tando Allahyar-II	Imdad Ali Pitafi	PPP	62,771	65.23	Muhammad Mohsin Magsi	GDA	29,325	30.47	33,446	47.34
Hyderabad	60	Hyderabad-I	Jam Khan Shoro	PPP	38,099	72.39	Ayaz Latif Palijo	GDA	6,922	13.15	31,177	38.76
Hyderabad	61	Hyderabad-II	Sharjeel Inam Memon	PPP	63,079	77.06	Saeed Ahmed Talpur	JUI(F)	11,368	13.89	51,711	42.72
Hyderabad	62	Hyderabad-III	Sabir Hussain	MQM(P)	24,385	36.07	Abdul Jabbar	PPP	18,209	26.93	6,176	38.96
Hyderabad	63	Hyderabad-IV	Rehan Rajpoot	IND	40,709	53.39	Kamran Shafique	MQM(P)	11,882	15.58	28,827	32.52
Hyderabad	64	Hyderabad-V	Muhammad Rashid Khan	MQM(P)	35,012	36.22	Naeem Ud Din	IND	26,072	26.97	8,940	36.91
Hyderabad	65	Hyderabad-VI	Nasir Hussain Qureshi	MQM(P)	23,184	33.97	Shoaib Shoukat	IND	14,321	20.99	8,863	35.03
Tando Muhammad Khan	66	Tando Muhammad Khan-I	Syed Aijaz Hussain Shah	PPP	47,705	56.28	Ahmed Saeed Jan	IND	17,648	20.82	30,057	48.77
Tando Muhammad Khan	67	Tando Muhammad Khan-II	Khurram Karim Soomro	PPP	52,006	66.92	Qadir Bux Magsi	KS	16,615	21.38	35,391	47.72
Badin	68	Badin-I	Muhammad Halepoto	PPP	63,506	74.80	Mansoor Ali Nizamani	GDA	14,236	16.77	49,270	45.81
Badin	69	Badin-II	Allah Bux Talpur	PPP	38,759	48.57	Mir Abdullah Khan	GDA	33,378	41.82	5,381	43.35
Badin	70	Badin-III	Sardar Arbab Ameer Amanullah Khan	PPP	44,206	48.57	Hassnain Ali Mirza	GDA	36,861	40.50	7,345	49.22
Badin	71	Badin-IV	Taj Muhammad	PPP	41,134	44.40	Muhammad Hassam Mirza	GDA	32,477	35.06	8,657	51.03
Badin	72	Badin-V	Ismail Rahoo	PPP	39,849	55.50	Ameer Hassan	GDA	24,296	33.84	15,553	46.09
Sujawal	73	Sujawal-I	Shah Hussain Shah Sheerazi	PPP	72,567	85.18	Muhammad Ismail Memon	JUI(F)	6,052	7.10	66,515	40.41
Sujawal	74	Sujawal-II	Muhammad Ali Malkani	PPP	83,900	79.01	Abdul Sattar	IND	14,259	13.43	69,641	53.32
Thatta	75	Thatta-I	Riaz Hussain Shah Sheerazi	PPP	80,745	80.88	Muhammad Arshad Memon	JUI(F)	6,596	6.61	74,149	39.21
Thatta	76	Thatta-II	Ali Hassan Zardari	PPP	71,408	81.86	Altaf Hussain Kachhi	TLP	4,812	5.52	66,596	35.52
Jamshoro	77	Jamshoro-I	Murad Ali Shah	PPP	74,613	81.39	Roshan Ali Buriro	GDA	10,268	11.20	64,345	53.44
Jamshoro	78	Jamshoro-II	Sikandar Ali Shoro	PPP	51,193	73.02	Syed Muneer Haider	GDA	10,850	15.48	40,343	45.38
Jamshoro	79	Jamshoro-III	Malik Sikandar Khan (Sindh politician)	PPP	42,959	69.75	Malik Changez Khan	IND	7,849	12.75	35,110	45.86
Dadu	80	Dadu-I	Abdul Aziz Junejo	PPP	52,301	51.30	Karim Ali Jatoi	GDA	43,816	42.98	8,485	42.12
Dadu	81	Dadu-II	Fayaz Ali Butt	PPP	54,635	52.66	Liaquat Ali Jatoi	GDA	47,019	45.32	7,616	48.24
Dadu	82	Dadu-III	Pir Mujeeb ul Haq	PPP	44,565	58.23	Ashique Ali Zounr	GDA	19,618	25.63	24,947	37.99
Dadu	83	Dadu-IV	Pir Saleh Shah Jeelani	PPP	48,980	52.96	Imdad Hussain Leghari	GDA	20,715	22.40	28,265	40.74
Malir	84	Karachi Malir-I	Muhammad Yousuf Baloch	PPP	26,358	45.53	Zain Ul Abedin Kolachi	IND	13,907	24.02	12,451	44.55
Malir	85	Karachi Malir-II	Muhammad Sajid	PPP	27,773	43.96	Pir Hafeez Ullah	PML(N)	14,361	22.73	13,412	42.52
Malir	86	Karachi Malir-III	Abdul Razak Raja	PPP	15,017	45.50	Muhammad Yaqoob	PML(N)	6,633	20.10	8,384	39.35
Malir	87	Karachi Malir-IV	Mehmood Alam Jamot	PPP	19,220	41.12	Tause Khan	IND	7,703	16.48	11,517	44.79
Malir	88	Karachi Malir-V	Ajaz Khan	IND	17,680	29.60	Syed Muzammil Shah	PPP	12,940	21.67	4,818	38.26
Malir	89	Karachi Malir-VI	Muhammad Saleem Baloch	PPP	25,326	35.37	Ahsan Khattak	IND	15,768	22.02	9,558	39.02
Korangi	90	Karachi Korangi-I	Shariq Jamal	MQM(P)	35,609	29.66	Waqas Iqbal	IND	32,645	27.20	2,964	42.64
Korangi	91	Karachi Korangi-II	Muhammad Farooq	JI	23,499	31.17	Abid Jilani	IND	22,732	30.15	767	37.33
Korangi	92	Karachi Korangi-III	Wajid Hussain Khan	IND	28,309	31.76	Mirza Farhan Baig	JI	20,860	23.40	7,446	32.86
Korangi	93	Karachi Korangi-IV	Sajid Hussain	IND	20,372	32.88	Abdul Hafeez	JI	10,832	17.48	9,540	33.27
Korangi	94	Karachi Korangi-V	Najam Mirza	MQM(P)	23,285	28.26	Arshad Hussain	JI	18,884	22.92	4,401	33.18
Korangi	95	Karachi Korangi-VI	Muhammad Farooq Awan	PPP	16,386	32.78	Raja Azhar Khan	IND	11,027	22.06	5,359	38.95
Korangi	96	Karachi Korangi-VII	Muhammad Owais	IND	16,997	29.47	Shafiq Ahmed	JI	9,644	16.72	7,353	33.43
Karachi East	97	Karachi East-I	Shoukat Ali	MQM(P)	5,000	27.11	Bashir Ahmed	PPP	4,603	24.96	397	34.16
Karachi East	98	Karachi East-II	Arsalan Perwaiz	MQM(P)	13,903	44.95	Hammad Ullah Khan	JI	5,551	17.95	8,352	34.74
Karachi East	99	Karachi East-III	Syed Farhan Ansari	MQM(P)	26,658	37.80	Muhammad Yunus Barai	JI	22,321	31.65	4,337	35.90
Karachi East	100	Karachi East-IV	Syed Muhammad Usman	MQM(P)	21,970	31.83	Haider Ali Umrani	PPP	15,241	22.08	6,729	31.24
Karachi East	101	Karachi East-V	Moid Anver	MQM(P)	43,859	34.79	Agha Arsalan Khan	IND	35,186	27.91	8,673	42.35
Karachi East	102	Karachi East-VI	Muhammad Aamir Siddiqui	MQM(P)	25,330	28.77	Muhammad Najeed Ayubi	JI	19,514	22.16	5,816	35.92
Karachi East	103	Karachi East-VII	Faisal Rafiq	MQM(P)	15,870	28.36	Muhammad Yunus	JI	12,345	22.06	3,525	28.99
Karachi East	104	Karachi East-VIII	Muhammad Daniyal	MQM(P)	30,465	40.24	Muhammad Junaid Mukati	JI	23,588	31.15	6,877	35.66
Karachi East	105	Karachi East-IX	Saeed Ghani	PPP	26,168	39.87	Irfanullah Khan Marwat	GDA	20,111	30.64	6,057	41.33
Karachi South	106	Karachi South-I	Sajjad Ali Somroo	IND	20,670	28.18	Usman Ghani	PPP	16,842	22.96	3,804	32.74
Karachi South	107	Karachi South-II	Muhammad Yousuf	PPP	26,902	37.71	Khalid	IND	19,673	27.57	7,229	29.07
Karachi South	108	Karachi South-III	Muhammad Dilawar	MQM(P)	20,014	26.04	Murad Sheikh	IND	16,966	22.08	3,048	30.35
Karachi South	109	Karachi South-IV	Bilal Hussain Khan Jadoon	IND	27,856	40.46	Muhammad Ziker Mahenti	JI	12,825	18.63	15,029	31.23
Karachi South	110	Karachi South-V	Rehan Bandukda	IND	47,866	45.12	Sufyan	JI	22,630	21.33	24,820	34.04
Keamari	111	Karachi Keamari-I	Liaquat Ali Askani	PPP	29,396	56.93	Amjad Iqbal Afridi	IND	7,743	15.00	21,653	42.99
Keamari	112	Karachi Keamari-II	Muhammad Asif	PPP	11,724	26.27	Malak Sarbuland Khan	IND	9,943	22.28	1,781	32.14
Keamari	113	Karachi Keamari-III	Faheem Ahmed	MQM(P)	24,465	30.57	Ghulam Qadir	IND	21,031	26.28	3,434	38.42
Keamari	114	Karachi Keamari-IV	Muhammad Shabbir	IND	21,531	31.24	Niaz Muhammad	PPP	14,559	21.13	6,972	30.52
Keamari	115	Karachi Keamari-V	Muhammad Asif Khan	PPP	20,310	30.50	Shah Nawaz Jadoon	IND	19,544	29.35	766	39.47
Karachi West	116	Karachi West-I	Ali Ahmed	PPP	7,153	36.17	Hassan Ali	IND	3,540	17.90	3,613	47.01
Karachi West	117	Karachi West-II	Sheikh Abdullah	MQM(P)	11,205	32.20	Tariq Hussain	IND	9,766	28.07	1,439	34.37
Karachi West	118	Karachi West-III	Naseer Ahmed	MQM(P)	9,740	26.02	Salih Zada	IND	7,136	19.07	2,604	35.74
Karachi West	119	Karachi West-IV	Ali Khurshidi	MQM(P)	22,424	27.14	Saeed Ahmed	IND	16,812	20.35	5,612	34.13
Karachi West	120	Karachi West-V	Mazahir Amir Khan	MQM(P)	35,789	34.80	Syed Shafiq	IND	21,097	20.52	14,692	43.86
Karachi West	121	Karachi West-VI	Syed Ejaz Ul Haque	MQM(P)	26,454	29.72	Shakeel Ahmad	IND	21,460	24.11	4,994	42.04
Karachi Central	122	Karachi Central-I	Rehan Akram	MQM(P)	48,170	42.27	Farhan Saleem	IND	23,018	20.20	25,152	55.57
Karachi Central	123	Karachi Central-II	Abdul Waseem	MQM(P)	17,526	27.14	Muhammad Akbar	JI	13,117	20.31	4,409	33.46
Karachi Central	124	Karachi Central-III	Abdul Basit	MQM(P)	31,035	35.45	Muhammad Ahmed	JI	18,438	21.06	12,597	42.81
Karachi Central	125	Karachi Central-IV	Syed Adil Askari	MQM(P)	63,812	37.65	Muhammad Farooq Naimatullah	JI	49,943	29.47	13,869	63.36
Karachi Central	126	Karachi Central-V	Muhammad Iftikhar Alam	MQM(P)	38,729	34.76	Nusrat Ullah	JI	25,835	23.19	12,894	41.78
Karachi Central	127	Karachi Central-VI	Muhammad Maaz Mehboob	MQM(P)	23,493	37.68	Muhammad Masood Ali	JI	12,673	20.33	10,820	25.88
Karachi Central	128	Karachi Central-VII	Taha Ahmed Khan	MQM(P)	34,915	44.13	Syed Wajeeh Hassan	JI	18,882	23.86	16,033	31.07
Karachi Central	129	Karachi Central-VIII	Hafiz Naeem Ur Rehman	JI	26,296	31.48	Maaz Mukaddam	MQM(P)	20,608	24.67	5,688	31.73
Karachi Central	130	Karachi Central-IX	Jamal Ahmed	MQM(P)	38,884	43.25	Haris Ali Khan	JI	19,366	21.54	19,518	40.41

== See also ==
- 2024 Pakistani general election
- 2024 Khyber Pakhtunkhwa provincial election
- 2024 Balochistan provincial election
- 2024 Punjab provincial election
