= Sheikh Abdullah (disambiguation) =

Sheikh Abdullah (1905–1982) was the 1st elected prime minister and 3rd chief minister of Jammu and Kashmir, India.

Sheikh Abdullah may also refer to:

- Sheikh Abdullah (Pakistani politician) (born 1965), former member of the Provincial Assembly of Sindh
- Sheikh Abdullah (educationalist) (1874–1965), Indian educationalist, social reformer, lawyer, founder of Women's College, Aligarh

== Other uses ==
- Sheikh Abdullah Al-Salem Cultural Centre, cultural complex located in Kuwait
