= Azfar =

Azfar (Urdu: اظفر) is both a masculine given name and a surname mainly occurring in Pakistan, but also in Bangladesh and Malaysia. Notable people with the name include:

== Given name ==
- Azfar Arif (born 1999), Malaysian footballer
- Azfar Hussain, Bangladeshi American bilingual writer, translator, and literary critic
- Azfar Jafri, Pakistani film director, screenwriter, and actor
- Azfar Rehman (born 1987), Pakistani model, TV host and actor

== Surname ==
- Kamaluddin Azfar (1930–2025), Pakistani politician from Sindh

== See also ==
- Rabia Azfar Nizami, Pakistani politician from Sindh
