= Wajahat =

Wajahat is a given name and a surname. It may refer to:

== Given name ==
- Chaudhry Wajahat Hussain (born 1950), Pakistani politician
- Wajahat Ali, Pakistani-American writer, see The Domestic Crusaders
- Wajahat Attre (1945–2017), Pakistani music director
- Wajahat Habibullah (born 1945), Indian civil servant
- Wajahat Khan (born 1964), Indian sarod player and composer
- Wajahat Saeed Khan (born 1978), Pakistani journalist
- Wajahat Masood (born 1966), Pakistani journalist and human rights activist
- Wajahat Mirza (1908–1990), Indian screenwriter and film director
- Wajahat Ather Mirza (born 1975), Indian politician
- Wajahat Rauf (born 1976), Pakistani director, actor, screenwriter, producer and musician

== Surname ==
- Asghar Wajahat (born 1946), Indian scholar of Hindi and writer
- Muhammad Wajahat (died 2018), Pakistani politician
- Shazia Wajahat, Pakistani television and film producer
