= Khurram Karim Soomro =

Member of the Provincial Assembly of Sindh from Tando Muhammad Khan (2024–2029)

- خرم ڪريم سومرو

Member of the Provincial Assembly of Sindh
- Incumbent
- Assumed office 25 February 2024
- Constituency: PS-67 Tando Muhammad Khan-II

Personal details
- Party: PPP (2024-present)
- Parent: Abdul Karim Soomro (father)

Khurram Karim Soomro (Sindhi: خرم ڪريم سومرو; Urdu: خُرم کریم سُومرو) is a Pakistani politician who is member of the Provincial Assembly of Sindh.

== Political career ==
Soomro won the 2024 Sindh provincial election from PS-67 Tando Muhammad Khan-II as a Pakistan People’s Party candidate. He received 51,886 votes while runner up Qadir Magsi of Sindh Taraqi Pasand Party received 16,602 votes.
