= Chaudhary Javed Iqbal Arain =

Pakistani politician

- چوہدری جاوید اقبال آرائیں

Member of the Provincial Assembly of Sindh
- Incumbent
- Assumed office 25 February 2024
- Constituency: PS-37 Shaheed Benazirabad-II

Personal details
- Party: PPP (2024-present)

Chaudhary Javed Iqbal Arain (Urdu: چوہدری جاوید اقبال آرائیں) is a Pakistani politician who is member of the Provincial Assembly of Sindh.

== Political career ==
Arain won the 2024 Sindh provincial election from PS-37 Shaheed Benazirabad-II as a Pakistan People’s Party candidate. He received 70,383 votes while runner up Independent (PTI) Supported Pakistan Tehreek-e-Insaf, candidate Anayatullah Rind received 20,492 votes.
