= Muhammad Rashid Khan (Pakistani politician) =

Member of the Provincial Assembly of Sindh from Hyderabad (2024–2029)

- محمد راشد خان

Member of the Provincial Assembly of Sindh
- Incumbent
- Assumed office 25 February 2024
- Constituency: PS-64 Hyderabad-V

Personal details
- Born: Hyderabad, Sindh, Pakistan
- Party: MQM-P (2024-present)

Muhammad Rashid Khan (Urdu: محمد راشد خان) is a Pakistani politician who is member of the Provincial Assembly of Sindh.

== Political career ==
Khan won the 2024 Sindh provincial election from PS-64 Hyderabad-V as a Muttahida Qaumi Movement – Pakistan candidate. He received 35,235 votes while runner up Independent candidate Naeemuddin received 26,063 votes.
