= Muhammad Arif Khan Mahar =

Member of the Provincial Assembly of Sindh from Shikarpur (2024–2029)

- محمد عارف خان مھر

Member of the Provincial Assembly of Sindh
- Incumbent
- Assumed office 25 February 2025
- Constituency: PS-8 Shikarpur-II

Personal details
- Party: PPP (2024-present)

Muhammad Arif Khan Mahar (Sindhi: محمد عارف خان مھر;Urdu: محمد عارف خان مہر) is a Pakistani politician who is member of the Provincial Assembly of Sindh.

== Political career ==
Mahar won the 2024 Sindh provincial election from PS-8 Shikarpur-II as a Pakistan People’s Party candidate. He received 64,016 votes while runner up Abid Hussain Jatoi of Jamiat Ulema-e-Islam (F) received 51,869 votes.
