= PS-66 Tando Muhammad Khan-I =

Constituency of the Provincial Assembly of Sindh, Pakistan

- Constituency for the Provincial Assembly of Sindh
- Region: Tando Muhammad Khan Tehsil and Tando Ghulam Hyder Tehsil (partly) of Tando Muhammad Khan District

Current constituency
- Party: PPP
- Member: Syed Aijaz Hussain Shah
- Created from: PS-53 Hyderabad-XI (2002-2018); PS-68 Tando Muhammad Khan-I (2018-2023)

PS-66 Tando Muhammad Khan-I (پی ایس-66، ٹنڈو محمد خان-1) is a constituency of the Provincial Assembly of Sindh.

== General elections 2024 ==
Provincial election 2024: PS-66 Tando Muhammad Khan-I
Party	Candidate	Votes	%	±%
PPP	Syed Aijaz Hussain Shah	47,705	56.28	
Independent	Ahmed Saeed Jan	17,648	20.82	
PTI	Muhammad Altaf Niazmani (Note: Filed nomination papers as PTI candidate but ECP allowed him to run as an independent)	8,675	10.24	
Independent	Muhammad lrfan	4,263	5.03	
TLP	Pir Muhammad Ali Sarhandi	1,775	2.09	
Independent	Sadain Jan	1,453	1.71	
JI	Aijaz Ali	1,149	1.36	
Others	Others (fourteen candidates)	2,089	2.47	
Turnout		89,707	48.77	
Total valid votes		84,757	94.48	
Rejected ballots		4,950	5.52	
Majority		30,057	35.46	
Registered electors		183,937		
PPP hold				

== General elections 2018 ==
Provincial election 2018: PS-68 Tando Muhammad Khan-I
Party	Candidate	Votes	%	±%
PPP	Syed Aijaz Hussain Shah	32,665	42.82	
GDA	Mir Ali Hyder Talpur	20,738	27.18	
PTI	Muhammad Altaf Nizamani	13,805	18.10	
Independent	Rai Singh	4,517	5.92	
Independent	Dr. Ahmed Noonari	1,618	2.12	
Independent	Muhammad Khan	1,469	1.93	
PPP(SB)	Qadir Bux Khan Nizamani	354	0.46	
Independent	Ghulam Murtaza Memon	259	0.34	
Independent	Muhammad Irfan	177	0.23	
Independent	Hussain Ali	167	0.22	
Independent	Yar Muhammad	158	0.21	
Independent	Muhammad Essa Jagsi	113	0.15	
Independent	Muhammad Juman Kehar	85	0.11	
Independent	Mir Jawad Ali Talpur	67	0.09	
Independent	Ghulam Rasool Mirbahar	48	0.06	
Independent	Ali Murtaza	29	0.04	
Independent	Shafique Ahmed Bhatti	23	0.03	
Majority		11,927	15.64	
Valid ballots		76,292		
Rejected ballots		4,650		
Turnout		80,942		
Registered electors		147,191		
hold				

== General elections 2013 ==
Contesting candidates	Party affiliation	Votes polled

== General elections 2008 ==
Contesting candidates	Party affiliation	Votes polled

== See also ==
- PS-65 Hyderabad-VI
- PS-67 Tando Muhammad Khan-II
