= PS-111 Karachi Keamari-I =

Constituency of the Provincial Assembly of Sindh, Pakistan

- Constituency for the Provincial Assembly of Sindh
- Region: Gabo Pat village of Maripur town and Baldia Town (partly) of Keamari District in Karachi
- Electorate: 122,783

Current constituency
- Member: Vacant
- Created from: PS-90 Karachi-II (2002-2018); PS-112 Karachi West-I (2018-2023)

PS-111 Karachi Keamari-I (پی ایس-۱۱۱، کراچی کیماڑی-۱) is a constituency of the Provincial Assembly of Sindh.

== General elections 2024 ==
Provincial election 2024: PS-111 Karachi Keamari-I
Party	Candidate	Votes	%	±%
PPP	Liaquat Ali Askani	29,396	56.93	
Independent	Amjad Iqbal Afridi (Note: Filed nomination papers as PTI candidate but ECP allowed him to run as an Independent)	7,743	15.00	
JUI (F)	Umar Sadiq	4,573	8.86	
JI	Ghulam Mustafa	4,098	7.94	
TLP	Syed Zia Uddin	2,991	5.79	
MQM-P	Fayyaz Ul Haq Khan	1,621	3.14	
Others	Others (thirteen candidates)	1,211	2.34	
Turnout		52,786	42.99	
Total valid votes		51,633	97.82	
Rejected ballots		1,153	2.18	
Majority		21,653	41.93	
Registered electors		122,783		
PPP hold				

== General elections 2018 ==
Provincial election 2018: PS-112 Karachi West-I
Party	Candidate	Votes	%	±%
PPP	Liaquat Ali Askani	11,971	24.73	
PTI	Amjad Iqbal Afridi	9,394	19.40	
PML(N)	Saleem Javed	7,298	15.07	
Independent	Mubarak Baloch	5,611	11.59	
TLP	Muhammad Akram Awan	4,276	8.83	
MMA	Naik Amanullah Khan	3,587	7.41	
PSP	Imtiaz Akbar	1,843	3.81	
MMA	Afshan Qamber Ali	775	1.60	
PRHP	Jamshed Alam	720	1.49	
Independent	Zain Ul Abdeen	684	1.41	
Independent	Muhammad Hanif	397	0.82	
Independent	Muhammad Ali Khuharo	287	0.59	
GDA	Mirza Faysal Baig	267	0.55	
Independent	Aijaz Ali	261	0.54	
ANP	Asif Khan Yousuf Zai	244	0.50	
Independent	Muhammad Shahzad Akram	239	0.49	
AAT	Muhammad Ejaz Chaudhary	213	0.44	
Independent	Ahmed Raza	125	0.26	
Independent	Abdul Karim	61	0.13	
Independent	Imtiaz Ahmed	54	0.11	
Independent	Shoukat Zaman	42	0.09	
Independent	Muhammad Akbar Khan	41	0.08	
Independent	Muhammad Hashim Noorani	16	0.03	
Independent	Rizwan Khan	8	0.02	
Majority		2,577	5.33	
Valid ballots		48,414		
Rejected ballots		1,922		
Turnout		50,336		
Registered electors		131,219		
hold				

== General elections 2013 ==
Contesting candidates	Party affiliation	Votes polled

== General elections 2008 ==
Contesting candidates	Party affiliation	Votes polled

== See also ==
- PS-110 Karachi South-V
- PS-112 Karachi Keamari-II
