= PS-35 Naushahro Feroze-IV =

Constituency of the Provincial Assembly of Sindh, Pakistan

- Constituency for the Provincial Assembly of Sindh
- Region: Naushahro Feroze Taluka (partly) and Moro Tehsil (partly) including Moro city of Naushahro Feroze District
- Electorate: 225,708

Current constituency
- Member: Vacant
- Created from: PS-23 Naushero Feroze-V (2002–2018); PS-36 Naushahro Feroze-IV (2018–2023)

PS-35 Naushahro Feroze-IV (پی ایس-35، نوشہروفِيروز-4) is a constituency of the Provincial Assembly of Sindh.

== General elections 2024 ==
Provincial election 2024: PS-35 Naushahro Feroze-IV
| Party | Candidate | Votes | % | ±% |
|---|---|---|---|---|
| PPP | Zia Ul Hassan Lanjar | 81,818 | 70.63 | |
| GDA | Masroor Ahmed Khan Jatoi | 29,614 | 25.57 | |
| Others | Others (nineteen candidates) | 4,403 | 3.80 | |
| Turnout | | 119,844 | 53.10 | |
| Total valid votes | | 115,835 | 96.66 | |
| Rejected ballots | | 4,009 | 3.34 | |
| Majority | | 52,204 | 45.06 | |
| Registered electors | | 225,708 | | |
| PPP gain from GDA | | | | |

== General elections 2018 ==
Provincial election 2018: PS-36 Nausharo Feroze-IV
| Party | Candidate | Votes | % | ±% |
|---|---|---|---|---|
| GDA | Arif Mustafa Jatoi | 47,557 | 48.98 | |
| PPP | Zia Ul Hassan | 45,850 | 47.22 | |
| PTI | Shahnawaz Jatoi | 1,320 | 1.36 | |
| Independent | Imdad Ali | 956 | 0.98 | |
| Independent | Aziz Ahmed Behan | 237 | 0.24 | |
| Independent | Ghulam Murtaza Khan Jatoi | 222 | 0.23 | |
| PSP | Kouro | 192 | 0.20 | |
| PML(N) | Adnan Arain | 169 | 0.17 | |
| Independent | Farooque Ahmed | 147 | 0.15 | |
| Independent | Feroze Ahmed Jamali | 142 | 0.15 | |
| Independent | Khan Bahadur Bhatti | 81 | 0.08 | |
| Independent | Sadullah Kalhoro | 78 | 0.08 | |
| Independent | Wajid Mustafa Korai | 66 | 0.07 | |
| Independent | Ibrar Ali | 41 | 0.04 | |
| Independent | Muhammad Yameen Chandio | 35 | 0.04 | |
| Majority | | 1,707 | 1.76 | |
| Valid ballots | | 97,093 | | |
| Rejected ballots | | 4,295 | | |
| Turnout | | 101,388 | | |
| Registered electors | | 186,437 | | |
| hold | | | | |

== General elections 2013 ==
| Contesting candidates | Party affiliation | Votes polled |

== General elections 2008 ==
| Contesting candidates | Party affiliation | Votes polled |

== See also ==
- PS-34 Naushahro Feroze-III
- PS-36 Nawabshah-I
