= Mir Mehboob Ali Khan Bijarani =

Member of the Provincial Assembly of Sindh from Kashmore (2024–2029)

- میر محبوب علی خان بجارانی

Member of the Provincial Assembly of Sindh
- Incumbent
- Assumed office 25 February 2024
- Constituency: PS-6 Kashmore-III

Personal details
- Party: PPP (2024-present)

Sardar Mir Mehboob Ali Khan Bijarani (Urdu: سردار میر محبوب علی خان بجارانی) is a Pakistani politician who is member of the Provincial Assembly of Sindh.

== Political career ==
Bijarani won the 2024 Sindh provincial election from PS-6 Kashmore-III as a Pakistan People’s Party candidate. He received 86,365 votes while runner up Abdul Qayyum of Jamiat Ulema-e-Islam (F) received 9,945 votes.
