= PS-4 Kashmore-I =

Constituency of the Provincial Assembly of Sindh, Pakistan

- Constituency for the Provincial Assembly of Sindh
- Region: Kashmore Tehsil (partly) Kashmore District
- Electorate: 193,419

Current constituency
- Member: Vacant
- Created from: PS-18 Jacobabad-VI

PS-4 Kashmore-I (پی ایس-4، کشمور-1) is a constituency of the Provincial Assembly of Sindh.

== General elections 2024 ==
Provincial election 2024: PS-4 Kashmore-I
Party	Candidate	Votes	%	±%
PPP	Abdul Rauf Khoso	58,046	64.35	
Independent	Mir Ghalib Hussain Khan	25,758	28.56	
Independent	Manzoor Ahmed Khoso	3,289	3.65	
Others	Others (nineteen candidates)	3,106	3.44	
Turnout		96,233	49.75	
Total valid votes		90,199	93.73	
Rejected ballots		6,034	6.27	
Majority		32,288	35.79	
Registered electors		193,419		

== General elections 2018 ==
Contesting candidates	Party affiliation	Votes polled

== General elections 2013 ==
Contesting candidates	Party affiliation	Votes polled

== General elections 2008 ==
Contesting candidates	Party affiliation	Votes polled

== See also ==
- PS-3 Jacobabad-III
- PS-5 Kashmore-II
