= PS-64 Hyderabad-V =

Constituency of the Provincial Assembly of Sindh, Pakistan

- Constituency for the Provincial Assembly of Sindh
- Region: Hyderabad city and Cantonment in Hyderabad District
- Electorate: 267,110

Current constituency
- Member: Vacant
- Created from: PS-45 Hyderabad-III (2002-2018); PS-66 Hyderabad-V (2018-2023)

PS-64 Hyderabad-V (پی ایس-64، حیدرآباد-5) is a constituency of the Provincial Assembly of Sindh.

== General elections 2024 ==
Provincial election 2024: PS-64 Hyderabad-V
Party	Candidate	Votes	%	±%
MQM-P	Muhammad Rashid Khan	35,012	36.22	
PTI	Naeem Ud Din (Note: Filed nomination papers as PTI candidate but ECP allowed him to run as an Independent)	26,072	26.97	
PPP	Mukhtiar Ahmed Dhamrah Aaijz	15,650	16.19	
Independent	Hina Naz	5,069	5.24	
Independent	Muhammad Rashid Qureshi	3,562	3.69	
TLP	Sallahuddin	3,375	3.49	
JI	Zaheeruddin Shaikh	2,800	2.90	
PML(N)	Rashid Hameed	990	1.02	
Others	Others (thirty five candidates)	4,140	4.28	
Turnout		98,600	36.91	
Total valid votes		96,670	98.04	
Rejected ballots		1,930	1.96	
Majority		8,940	9.25	
Registered electors		267,110		
MQM-P hold				

== General elections 2018 ==
Provincial election 2018: PS-66 Hyderabad-V
Party	Candidate	Votes	%	±%
MQM-P	Muhammad Rashid khilji	27,491	34.39	
PTI	Azhar Muhammad Shaikh	19,680	24.62	
PPP	Mukhtiar Ahmed Dhamrah	12,950	16.20	
TLP	Abida Naz	5,496	6.88	
MMA	Abdul Waheed Qureshi	4,698	5.88	
PSP	Syed Muhammad Ahmed Rasheed	3,012	3.77	
PML(N)	Kaleem Shaikh	1,695	2.12	
AAT	Abdul Jabbar	1,653	2.07	
PRHP	Ahmer Bilal	635	0.79	
Independent	Muhammad Asif Memon	526	0.66	
Independent	Muhammad Farhan Baba	498	0.62	
Independent	Syed Babar Yawar Shah	434	0.54	
Independent	Noor Muhammad	205	0.26	
MQM-H	Muhammad Usman	190	0.24	
PST	Tanveer Ahmed Siddique	172	0.22	
Independent	Samar Hussain	155	0.19	
Independent	Fatima Zahra	148	0.19	
Independent	Abdul Rasheed	111	0.14	
Independent	Kamran Shafique	84	0.11	
Independent	Faisal Farooq	57	0.07	
Independent	Saleem Khawaja	49	0.06	
Majority		7,811	9.77	
Valid ballots		79,939		
Rejected ballots		1,366		
Turnout		81,305		
Registered electors		210,308		
hold				

== General elections 2013 ==
Contesting candidates	Party affiliation	Votes polled

== General elections 2008 ==
Contesting candidates	Party affiliation	Votes polled

== See also ==
- PS-63 Hyderabad-IV
- PS-65 Hyderabad-VI
