= PS-65 Hyderabad-VI =

Constituency of the Provincial Assembly of Sindh, Pakistan

- Constituency for the Provincial Assembly of Sindh
- Region: Hyderabad city in Hyderabad District
- Electorate: 199,721

Current constituency
- Member: Vacant
- Created from: PS-46 Hyderabad-IV (2002-2018); PS-67 Hyderabad-VI (2018-2023)

PS-65 Hyderabad-VI (پی ایس-65، حیدرآباد-6) is a constituency of the Provincial Assembly of Sindh.

== General elections 2024 ==
Provincial election 2024: PS-65 Hyderabad-VI
Party	Candidate	Votes	%	±%
MQM-P	Nasir Hussain Qureshi	23,184	33.97	
Independent	Shoaib Shoukat (Note: Filed nomination papers as PTI candidate but ECP allowed him to run as an Independent)	14,321	20.99	
PPP	Muhammad Fareed Qureshi	14,209	20.82	
Independent	Muhammad Rashid Qureshi	3,406	4.99	
TLP	Muhammad Amjad	3,130	4.59	
Independent	Muhammad Iqbal Arain	2,710	3.97	
JI	Irfan	1,939	2.84	
Others	Others (thirty three candidates)	5,525	7.83	
Turnout		69,956	35.03	
Total valid votes		68,242	97.55	
Rejected ballots		1,714	2.45	
Majority		8,863	12.98	
Registered electors		199,721		
MQM-P hold				

== General elections 2018 ==
Provincial election 2018: PS-67 Hyderabad-VI
Party	Candidate	Votes	%	±%
MQM-P	Nasir Hussain Qureshi	22,563	34.46	
PTI	Umaid Ali Junejo	13,403	20.47	
PPP	Mohammad Sagheer	12,172	18.59	
TLP	Raza Muhammad Abbasi	8,124	12.41	
PSP	Mir Atiq ullah Talpur	3,525	5.38	
MMA	Syed Farhad Ali	2,624	4.01	
PML(N)	Muhammad Fahad Abbasi	1,028	1.57	
Independent	Muhammad Fareed Qureshi	404	0.62	
AAT	Muhammad Asif	375	0.57	
APML	Muhammad Ibrahim Azam	315	0.48	
PST	Syed Sajid Ali	205	0.31	
Independent	Abdul Hameed	172	0.26	
MQM-H	Rashid Ahmed	163	0.25	
Independent	Syed Ameer Shah Bukhari	159	0.24	
Independent	Manthar Ali Jatoi	73	0.11	
Independent	Irfan Anjum	67	0.10	
Independent	Abdul Jabbar	64	0.10	
Independent	Javed Baloch	37	0.06	
Majority		9,160	13.99	
Valid ballots		65,639		
Rejected ballots		1,679		
Turnout		67,318		
Registered electors		161,718		
hold				

== General elections 2013 ==
Contesting candidates	Party affiliation	Votes polled

== General elections 2008 ==
Contesting candidates	Party affiliation	Votes polled

== See also ==
- PS-64 Hyderabad-V
- PS-66 Tando Muhammad Khan-I
