= PS-117 Karachi West-II =

Constituency of the Provincial Assembly of Sindh, Pakistan

- Constituency for the Provincial Assembly of Sindh
- Region: Manghopir town (partly) of Karachi West District in Karachi
- Electorate: 103,313

Current constituency
- Member: Vacant
- Created from: PS-94 Karachi-VI (2002-2018); PS-121 Karachi West-X (2018-2023)

PS-117 Karachi West-II (پی ایس-117، کراچی غربی-2) is a constituency of the Provincial Assembly of Sindh.

== General elections 2024 ==
Provincial election 2024: PS-117 Karachi West-II
Party	Candidate	Votes	%	±%
MQM-P	Sheikh Abdullah	11,205	32.20	
Independent	Tariq Hussain (Note: Filed nomination papers as PTI candidate but ECP allowed him to run as an Independent)	9,766	28.07	
JI	Syed Muhammad Rizwan Shah	5,293	15.21	
TLP	Qais Mansoor Sheikh	3,132	9.00	
Independent	Muhammad Jamil Akhtar Khan	2,185	6.28	
PPP	Shamim Mumtaz	1,737	4.99	
PML(N)	Muhammad Sadiq Khan	487	1.40	
Others	Others (twenty three candidates)	989	2.85	
Turnout		35,503	34.37	
Total valid votes		34,794	98.00	
Rejected ballots		709	2.00	
Majority		1,439	4.13	
Registered electors		103,313		
MQM-P hold				

== General elections 2018 ==
Provincial election 2018: PS-121 Karachi West-X
Party	Candidate	Votes	%	±%
MQM-P	Basit Ahmed Siddiqui	9,936	22.78	
PTI	Jan Muhammad Gabool	9,469	21.71	
PPP	Ali Akbar	6,673	15.30	
TLP	Haider Ali	4,620	10.59	
MMA	Muhammad Khalid	4,606	10.56	
PSP	Sheikh Abdullah	3,024	6.93	
PML(N)	Abdul Nabi Brohi	2,436	5.59	
PML(Q)	Abdul Latif Rind	1,855	4.25	
Independent	Muhammad Sajid Hussain	225	0.52	
Independent	Shakir Ullah	167	0.38	
Independent	Junaid Hayat	162	0.37	
Independent	Habib Ur Razzaque	150	0.34	
Independent	Hafiz Junaid Saeed	89	0.20	
GDA	Azhar Salam	80	0.18	
MQM-H	Muhammad Naeem	47	0.11	
Independent	Abdul Shakoor Mengal	33	0.08	
Independent	Qadir Bux	25	0.06	
Independent	Saqib Ali	18	0.04	
Majority		467	1.07	
Valid ballots		43,615		
Rejected ballots		1,288		
Turnout		44,903		
Registered electors		119,886		
hold				

== General elections 2013 ==
Contesting candidates	Party affiliation	Votes polled

== General elections 2008 ==
Contesting candidates	Party affiliation	Votes polled

== See also ==
- PS-116 Karachi West-I
- PS-118 Karachi West-III
