= PS-5 Kashmore-II =

Constituency of the Provincial Assembly of Sindh, Pakistan

- Constituency for the Provincial Assembly of Sindh
- Region: Kashmore Tehsil (partly) and Kandhkot Tehsil (partly) of Kashmore District
- Electorate: 205,668

Current constituency
- Member: Vacant
- Created from: PS-17 Jacobabad-V

PS-5 Kashmore-II (پی ایس-5، کشمور-2) is a constituency of the Provincial Assembly of Sindh.

== General elections 2024 ==
Provincial election 2024: PS-5 Kashmore-II
Party	Candidate	Votes	%	±%
PPP	Ghulam Abid Khan	31,132	47.03	
JUI (F)	Rabnawaz	21,052	31.80	
PML(N)	Sardar Tegho Khan	10,760	16.26	
Others	Others (thirteen candidates)	3,253	4.91	
Turnout		72,288	35.15	
Total valid votes		66,197	91.57	
Rejected ballots		6,091	8.43	
Majority		10,080	15.23	
Registered electors		205,668		

== General elections 2018 ==
Contesting candidates	Party affiliation	Votes polled
Sardar Ghulam Abid	PPP	29809
Rabnawaz	MMA	19637
Jamsher Ogahi	Independent	1299
Abdul Raheem Pathan	Independent	656
Ihsan Ahmed Soomro	Independent	414
Dil Murad	SUP	337
Ahsan Ali Mirani	Independent	200
Faique Ali	Independent	192
Muhammad Ramzan Soomro	Independent	166
Sardar Ali Akbar Bangwar	Independent	127
Muhammad Yoqoob	Independent	108

== See also ==
- PS-4 Kashmore-I
- PS-6 Kashmore-III
