= PS-126 Karachi Central-V =

Constituency of the Provincial Assembly of Sindh, Pakistan

- Constituency for the Provincial Assembly of Sindh
- Region: Gulberg Town (partly) and Liaquatabad Town (partly) of Karachi Central District in Karachi
- Electorate: 290,983

Current constituency
- Member: Vacant
- Created from: PS-106 Karachi-XVIII (2002-2018); PS-126 Karachi Central-IV (2018-2023)

PS-126 Karachi Central-V (پی ایس-126، کراچی وسطی-5) is a constituency of the Provincial Assembly of Sindh.

== General elections 2024 ==
Provincial election 2024: PS-126 Karachi Central-V
Party	Candidate	Votes	%	±%
MQM-P	Iftikhar Alam	38,729	34.76	
JI	Nusrat Ullah	25,835	23.19	
PTI	Sheraz Ahmad Nagani (Note: Filed nomination papers as PTI candidate but ECP allowed him to run as an Independent)	18,757	16.84	
TLP	Nasir Ahmed	7,757	6.96	
Independent	Abid Hussain Qureshi	7,364	6.61	
PPP	Shezad Majeed	3,624	3.25	
Independent	Dua Masood	1,710	1.54	
Independent	Syed Muhammad Jahanzeb	1,702	1.53	
Independent	Asghar Ali	1,496	1.34	
Independent	Muhammad Idrees	1,287	1.16	
Others	Others (fifteen candidates)	3,157	2.82	
Turnout		113,029	41.78	
Total valid votes		111,418	98.58	
Rejected ballots		1,611	1.42	
Majority		12,894	11.57	
Registered electors		270,552		
MQM-P gain from JI				

== General elections 2018 ==
Provincial election 2018:PS-126 Karachi Central-IV
Party	Candidate	Votes	%	±%
PTI	Omar Omari	30,338	31.40	
MQM-P	Asif Ali Khan	25,068	25.95	
TLP	Abdul Rahim	16,014	16.57	
MMA	Muhammad Farooq Naimat Ullah	12,420	12.85	
PSP	Iftikhar Alam	6,184	6.40	
PML(N)	Zareena Shaheen	1,811	1.87	
PPP	Muhammad Jawad Jeelani	1,533	1.59	
AAT	Naseer Ahmed	1,383	1.43	
Independent	Imran	639	0.66	
PMA	Abdul Latif	506	0.52	
Independent	Sheraz Ahmad Nagani	266	0.28	
Independent	Irshad Ali	131	0.14	
Independent	Intikhab Alam Soori	131	0.14	
MQM-H	Anila Liaqat	80	0.08	
Independent	Nabeel Nasir	72	0.07	
Independent	Ausama Bin Shakeel	35	0.04	
Independent	Muhammad Haris Nazim Khan	7	0.01	
Majority		5,270	5.45	
Valid ballots		96,618		
Rejected ballots		1,248		
Turnout		97,866		
Registered electors		256,298		
hold				

== See also ==
- PS-125 Karachi Central-IV
- PS-127 Karachi Central-VI
