= PS-112 Karachi Keamari-II =

Constituency of the Provincial Assembly of Sindh, Pakistan

- Constituency for the Provincial Assembly of Sindh
- Region: Baldia Town (partly) of Keamari District in Karachi
- Electorate: 157,585

Current constituency
- Member: Muhammad Asif
- Created from: PS-91 Karachi-III (2002-2018); PS-116 Karachi West-V (2018-2023)

PS-112 Karachi Keamari-II (پی ایس-112، کراچی کیماڑی-2) is a constituency of the Provincial Assembly of Sindh.

== General elections 2024 ==
Provincial election 2024: PS-112 Karachi Keamari-II
Party	Candidate	Votes	%	±%
PPP	Muhammad Asif	11,724	26.27	
Independent	Sarbuland Khan (Note: Filed nomination papers as PTI candidate but ECP allowed him to run as an Independent)	9,943	22.28	
MQM-P	Muhammad Akram	5,571	12.48	
JI	Syed Khaleeq Ur Rehman	5,248	11.76	
PML(N)	Ghulam Shoaib	4,150	9.30	
TLP	Muhammad Usman	4,143	9.28	
Others	Others (twenty nine candidates)	3,845	8.63	
Turnout		50,642	32.14	
Total valid votes		44,624	88.12	
Rejected ballots		6,018	11.88	
Majority		1,781	3.99	
Registered electors		157,585		
PPP hold				

== General elections 2018 ==
Provincial election 2018: PS-116 Karachi West-V
Party	Candidate	Votes	%	±%
PTI	Malik Shehzad Awan	9,966	28.60	
PML(N)	Salheen	9,711	27.87	
MMA	Umar Sadiq	5,306	15.23	
TLP	Muhammad Afzal	2,373	6.81	
ANP	Gul Rasool	2,109	6.05	
PPP	Syed Qareeb Shah	1,904	5.46	
Independent	Dil Nawaz Ahmed	1,400	4.02	
MQM-P	Kiran Masood	1,307	3.75	
PSP	Muhammad Shahnawaz Qureshi	371	1.06	
PRHP	Sana Ullah	175	0.50	
GDA	Shoukat Hayat	52	0.15	
Independent	Sher Wali Khan	39	0.11	
Independent	Khan Muhammad	27	0.08	
Independent	Ali Akbar	27	0.08	
Independent	Syed Makhdoom Javed Husnain	21	0.06	
Independent	Jamal Khan	17	0.05	
Independent	Raja Haq Nawaz	16	0.05	
Independent	Irshad Alam	12	0.03	
Independent	Syed Anwar Shah	10	0.03	
Majority		255	0.73	
Valid ballots		34,834		
Rejected ballots		973		
Turnout		35,807		
Registered electors		97,851		
hold				

== General elections 2013 ==
Contesting candidates	Party affiliation	Votes polled

== General elections 2008 ==
Contesting candidates	Party affiliation	Votes polled

== See also ==
- PS-111 Karachi Keamari-I
- PS-113 Karachi Keamari-III
