= PS-7 Shikarpur-I =

Constituency of the Provincial Assembly of Sindh, Pakistan

- Constituency for the Provincial Assembly of Sindh
- Region: Khanpur Tehsil (partly) and Shikarpur Tehsil (partly) of Shikarpur District
- Electorate: 267,105

Current constituency
- Member: Vacant
- Created from: PS-11 Shikarpur-III

PS-7 Shikarpur-I (پی ایس-7، شكارپور-1) is a constituency of the Provincial Assembly of Sindh.

== General elections 2024 ==
Provincial election 2024: PS-7 Shikarpur-I
| Party | Candidate | Votes | % | ±% |
|---|---|---|---|---|
| PPP | Imtiaz Ahmed Shaikh | 61,874 | 53.76 | |
| JUI (F) | Agha Taimour Khan | 45,048 | 39.14 | |
| MWM | Asghar All | 2,796 | 2.43 | |
| Independent | Agha Shamasuddin Khan | 1,862 | 1.62 | |
| Others | Others (seven candidates) | 3,513 | 3.05 | |
| Turnout | | 119,711 | 44.82 | |
| Total valid votes | | 115,093 | 96.14 | |
| Rejected ballots | | 4,618 | 3.86 | |
| Majority | | 16,826 | 14.62 | |
| Registered electors | | 267,105 | | |

== General elections 2018 ==
| Contesting candidates | Party affiliation | Votes polled |

== General elections 2013 ==
| Contesting candidates | Party affiliation | Votes polled |

== General elections 2008 ==
| Contesting candidates | Party affiliation | Votes polled |

== See also ==
- PS-6 Kashmore-III
- PS-8 Shikarpur-II
