= Iftikhar Alam =

Pakistani politician

Member of the Provincial Assembly of Sindh
- Incumbent
- Assumed office 24 February 2024
- Constituency: PS-126 Karachi Central-V

Member of the Provincial Assembly of Sindh
- In office 29 May 2013 – 28 May 2018
- Constituency: PS-106 (Karachi-XVIII)

Personal details
- Born: Karachi, Sindh, Pakistan
- Party: MQM-P (2023-present)
- Other political affiliations: PSP (2016-2023); MQM-L (2013-2016)
- Parent: Muhammad Sardar Alam (father)

Muhammad Iftikhar Alam is a Pakistani politician who has been member of the Provincial Assembly of Sindh from 2013 to 2018. He was elected for another term in February 2024.

== Early life ==
Iftikhar Alam was born on 16 May 1972 in Karachi, Pakistan. His father is Muhammad Sardar Alam.

== Political career ==
In 2013, Iftikhar won PS-106 (Karachi-XVIII) on the seat of Muttahida Qaumi Movement – London (MQM-L).

In May 2016, Iftikhar left MQM and joined Anis Kaimkhani and Syed Mustafa Kamal newly formed party called PSP. In 2018, Iftikhar contested from PS-126 (Karachi Central 4) from PSP. However he received 6184 votes and couldn't win his seat in the Sindh Assembly.

In 2020, Iftikhar Alam was elected as senior joint secretary of PSP.

He was elected to the List of members of the 16th Provincial Assembly of Sindh as a candidate of the MQM-P from constituency PS-126 Karachi Central-V in the 2024 Pakistani general election.
