= PS-60 Hyderabad-I =

Constituency of the Provincial Assembly of Sindh, Pakistan

- Constituency for the Provincial Assembly of Sindh
- Region: Hyderabad Tehsil (partly) and Qasimabad Tehsil (partly) of Hyderabad District
- Electorate: 139,907

Current constituency
- Member: Vacant
- Created from: PS-47 Hyderabad-V (2002-2018); PS-62 Hyderabad-I (2018-2023)

PS-60 Hyderabad-I (پی ایس-60، حیدرآباد-1) is a constituency of the Provincial Assembly of Sindh.

== General elections 2024 ==
Provincial election 2024: PS-60 Hyderabad-I
| Party | Candidate | Votes | % | ±% |
|---|---|---|---|---|
| PPP | Jam Khan Shoro | 38,099 | 72.39 | |
| GDA | Ayaz Latif Palijo | 6,922 | 13.15 | |
| PTI | Afroz Shoro (Note: Filed nomination papers as PTI candidate but ECP allowed him to run as an Independent) | 4,138 | 7.86 | |
| Independent | Nek Muhammad Brohi | 1,044 | 1.98 | |
| Others | Others (sixteen candidates) | 2,427 | 4.62 | |
| Turnout | | 54,229 | 38.76 | |
| Total valid votes | | 52,630 | 97.05 | |
| Rejected ballots | | 1,599 | 2.95 | |
| Majority | | 31,177 | 59.24 | |
| Registered electors | | 139,907 | | |
| PPP hold | | | | |

== General elections 2018 ==
Provincial election 2018: PS-62 Hyderabad-I
| Party | Candidate | Votes | % | ±% |
|---|---|---|---|---|
| PPP | Jam Khan Shoro | 35,278 | 63.80 | |
| GDA | Ayaz Latif Palijo | 13,636 | 24.66 | |
| PTI | Mehfooz Ur Rehman Ursani | 4,389 | 7.94 | |
| Independent | Qadir Bux Magsi | 1,045 | 1.89 | |
| PPP(SB) | Abdul Majeed | 381 | 0.69 | |
| Independent | Muhammad Ali Vighio | 169 | 0.31 | |
| Independent | Muhammad Ali Abro | 98 | 0.18 | |
| PSP | Saddam Hussain | 87 | 0.16 | |
| MQM-P | Riaz Hussain | 51 | 0.09 | |
| Independent | Roshan Ali | 39 | 0.07 | |
| Independent | Habib Ur Rehman | 38 | 0.07 | |
| Independent | Shahid Hussain Solangi | 37 | 0.07 | |
| SUP | Dodo Maheri | 24 | 0.04 | |
| Independent | Allah Dad Talpur | 21 | 0.04 | |
| Majority | | 21,642 | 39.14 | |
| Valid ballots | | 55,293 | | |
| Rejected ballots | | 1,889 | | |
| Turnout | | 57,182 | | |
| Registered electors | | 132,864 | | |
| hold | | | | |

== General elections 2013 ==
| Contesting candidates | Party affiliation | Votes polled |

== General elections 2008 ==
| Contesting candidates | Party affiliation | Votes polled |

== See also ==
- PS-59 Tando Allahyar-II
- PS-61 Hyderabad-II
