= PS-128 Karachi Central-VII =

Constituency of the Provincial Assembly of Sindh, Pakistan

- Constituency for the Provincial Assembly of Sindh
- Region: Nazimabad Town (partly) of Karachi Central District in Karachi
- Electorate: 278,932

Current constituency
- Party: Muttahida Qaumi Movement – Pakistan
- Member: Taha Ahmed Khan
- Created from: PS-104 Karachi-XVI (2002-2018); PS-128 Karachi Central-VI (2018-2023)

PS-128 Karachi Central-VII (پی ایس-128، کراچی وسطی-7) is a constituency of the Provincial Assembly of Sindh.

== General elections 2024 ==
General elections will be held on 8 February 2024.

Provincial election 2024: PS-128 Karachi Central-VII
| Party | Candidate | Votes | % | ±% |
|---|---|---|---|---|
| MQM-P | Taha Ahmed Khan | 34,915 | 44.13 | |
| JI | Syed Wajih Hassan | 18,882 | 23.86 | |
| PTI | Saqib Iqbal (Note: Filed nomination papers as PTI candidate but ECP allowed him to run as an Independent) | 9,126 | 11.53 | |
| Independent | Khurram Saeed Khan | 3,494 | 4.42 | |
| Independent | Muhammad Saleem Khan | 3,357 | 4.24 | |
| PPP | Muhammad Arif Hussain Qureshi | 3,130 | 3.96 | |
| TLP | Muhammad Irfan | 2,271 | 2.87 | |
| Others | Others (twenty five candidates) | 3,951 | 4.99 | |
| Turnout | | 80,504 | 31.07 | |
| Total valid votes | | 79,126 | 98.29 | |
| Rejected ballots | | 1,378 | 1.71 | |
| Majority | | 16,033 | 20.27 | |
| Registered electors | | 259,126 | | |
| MQM-P hold | | | | |

== General elections 2018 ==
General elections were held on 25 July 2018.

Provincial election 2018: PS-128 Karachi Central-VI
| Party | Candidate | Votes | % | ±% |
|---|---|---|---|---|
| MQM-P | Muhammad Abbas Jafri | 29,482 | 31.38 | |
| PTI | Nusrat Anwar | 27,771 | 29.56 | |
| MMA | Syed Wajih Hassain | 8,871 | 9.44 | |
| TLP | Zohaib Ayubi | 8,859 | 9.43 | |
| PSP | Taha Ahmed Khan | 6,473 | 6.89 | |
| PPP | Muhammad Arif Hussain Qureshi | 4,953 | 5.27 | |
| PML(N) | Mohsin Jawed Dar | 4,015 | 4.27 | |
| APML | Syed Suleman Ali Ahmed | 1,554 | 1.65 | |
| ANP | Fazal Qayyum | 801 | 0.85 | |
| AAT | Ahsan Habib | 358 | 0.38 | |
| GDA | Muhammad Hafeez Khan | 256 | 0.27 | |
| Independent | Irshad Ali | 188 | 0.20 | |
| Independent | Muhammad Ayoub Javed | 100 | 0.11 | |
| MQM-H | Khizar Ali | 76 | 0.08 | |
| Independent | Muhammad Zahid | 75 | 0.08 | |
| Independent | Waqar Ali | 38 | 0.04 | |
| Peoples Movement of Pakistan | Ali Mansoor | 34 | 0.04 | |
| Independent | Muhammad Anis | 29 | 0.03 | |
| Independent | Nadeem Ahmed Zuberi | 27 | 0.03 | |
| Majority | | 1,711 | 1.82 | |
| Valid ballots | | 93,960 | | |
| Rejected ballots | | 1,156 | | |
| Turnout | | 95,116 | | |
| Registered electors | | 237,062 | | |
| hold | | | | |

== See also ==
- PS-127 Karachi Central-VI
- PS-129 Karachi Central-VIII
