= PS-3 Jacobabad-III =

Constituency of the Provincial Assembly of Sindh, Pakistan

- Constituency for the Provincial Assembly of Sindh
- Region: Jacobabad Tehsil (partly),Garhi Khairo Tehsil and Thul Tehsil (partly) of Jacobabad District
- Electorate: 196,661

Current constituency
- Member: Vacant
- Created from: PS-13 Jacobabad-I

PS-3 Jacobabad-III (پی ایس-3، جیکب آباد-3) is a constituency of the Provincial Assembly of Sindh.

== General elections 2024 ==
Provincial election 2024: PS-3 Jacobabad-III
Party	Candidate	Votes	%	±%
PPP	Mumtaz Hussain Khan	40,106	53.10	
PTI	Mir Aurangzaib Panhwar	31,432	41.61	
TLP	Arbab Khan	1,034	1.37	
Others	Others (twelve candidates)	2,963	3.92	
Turnout		82,954	42.18	
Total valid votes		75,535	91.06	
Rejected ballots		7,419	8.94	
Majority		8,674	11.49	
Registered electors		196,661		

== General elections 2018 ==
Contesting candidates	Party affiliation	Votes polled

== General elections 2013 ==
Contesting candidates	Party affiliation	Votes polled

== General elections 2008 ==
Contesting candidates	Party affiliation	Votes polled

== See also ==
- PS-2 Jacobabad-II
- PS-4 Kashmore-I
