= PS-67 Tando Muhammad Khan-II =

Constituency of the Provincial Assembly of Sindh, Pakistan

- Constituency for the Provincial Assembly of Sindh
- Region: Bulri Shah Karim and Tando Ghulam Hyder Tehsil (partly) of Tando Muhammad Khan District

Current constituency
- Party: PPP
- Member: Abdul Karim Soomro
- Created from: PS-54 Hyderabad-XII (2002-2018); PS-69 Tando Muhammad Khan-II (2018-2023)

PS-67 Tando Muhammad Khan-II (پی ایس-67، ٹنڈو محمد خان-2) is a constituency of the Provincial Assembly of Sindh.

== General elections 2024 ==
Provincial election 2024: PS-67 Tando Muhammad Khan-II
Party	Candidate	Votes	%	±%
PPP	Khurram Karim Soomro	52,006	66.92	
STP	Qadir Magsi	16,615	21.38	
PTI	Abdul Rahim (Note: Filed nomination papers as PTI candidate but ECP allows him to run as an independent)	4,461	5.74	
TLP	Noor Muhammad Turk	1,967	2.53	
Others	Others (eight candidates)	2,668	3.43	
Turnout		82,316	47.72	
Total valid votes		77,717	94.41	
Rejected ballots		4,599	5.59	
Majority		35,391	45.54	
Registered electors		172,507		
PPP hold				

== General elections 2018 ==
Provincial election 2018: PS-69 Tando Muhammad Khan-II
Party	Candidate	Votes	%	±%
PPP	Abdul Karim Soomro	32,109	50.80	
GDA	Abdul Raheem Katiar	19,486	30.83	
PTI	Syed Zulfiqar Ali Shah	9,524	15.07	
Independent	Abdul Latif Soomro	1,347	2.13	
Tabdeeli Pasand Party Pakistan	Kawish Bagh Ali	302	0.48	
Independent	Abdul Qadir Soomro	188	0.30	
Independent	Fayaz Raheem Katiar	158	0.25	
Independent	Khurram Kareem Soomro	92	0.15	
Majority		12,623	19.97	
Valid ballots		63,206		
Rejected ballots		2,993		
Turnout		66,199		
Registered electors		127,750		
hold				

== General elections 2013 ==
Contesting candidates	Party affiliation	Votes polled

== General elections 2008 ==
Contesting candidates	Party affiliation	Votes polled

== See also ==
- PS-66 Tando Muhammad Khan-I
- PS-68 Badin-I
