= PS-8 Shikarpur-II =

Constituency of the Provincial Assembly of Sindh, Pakistan

- Constituency for the Provincial Assembly of Sindh
- Region: Khanpur Tehsil (partly) and Lakhi Tehsil (partly) of Shikarpur District
- Electorate: 192,459

Current constituency
- Member: Vacant
- Created from: PS-12 Shikarpur-IV

PS-8 Shikarpur-II (پی ایس-8، شكارپور-2) is a constituency of the Provincial Assembly of Sindh.

== General elections 2024 ==
Provincial election 2024: PS-8 Shikarpur-II
Party	Candidate	Votes	%	±%
PPP	Muhammad Arif Khan Mahar	64,016	54.33	
JUI (F)	Abid Hussain Jatoi	51,869	44.02	
Others	Others (four candidates)	1,936	1.65	
Turnout		121,199	62.97	
Total valid votes		117,821	97.21	
Rejected ballots		3,378	2.79	
Majority		12,147	10.31	
Registered electors		192,461		

== General elections 2018 ==
Contesting candidates	Party affiliation	Votes polled

== General elections 2013 ==
Contesting candidates	Party affiliation	Votes polled

== General elections 2008 ==
Contesting candidates	Party affiliation	Votes polled

== See also ==
- PS-7 Shikarpur-I
- PS-9 Shikarpur-III
