= PS-37 Shaheed Benazirabad-II =

Constituency of the Provincial Assembly of Sindh, Pakistan

- Constituency for the Provincial Assembly of Sindh
- Region: Nawabshah Taluka including Shaheed Benazirabad city of Shaheed Benazirabad District
- Electorate: 258,473

Current constituency
- Member: Vacant
- Created from: PS-26 Nawabshah-III (2002-2018); PS-38 Nawabshah-II (2018-2023)

PS-37 Shaheed Benazirabad-II (پی ایس-۳۷، شہید بینظیر آباد-۲) is a constituency of the Provincial Assembly of Sindh.

== General elections 2024 ==
Provincial election 2024: PS-37 Shaheed Benazirabad-II
Party	Candidate	Votes	%	±%
PPP	Chaudhary Javed Iqbal Arain	70,799	62.11	
PTI	Inayat Ali Rind (Note: Filed nomination papers as PTI candidate but ECP allowed him to run as an Independent)	20,300	17.81	
MQM-P	Syed Sajjad Hussain Shah Taqvi	9,492	8.33	
Independent	Muhammad Bilal	3,859	3.39	
TLP	Muhammad Arif	3,785	3.32	
JUI (F)	Zakir Hussain Jamali	2,065	1.81	
Others	Others (seventeen candidates)	3,691	3.23	
Turnout		116,628	45.12	
Total valid votes		113,991	97.74	
Rejected ballots		2,637	2.26	
Majority		50,499	44.30	
Registered electors		258,473		
PPP hold				

== General elections 2018 ==
Provincial election 2018: PS-38 Shaheed Benazirabad-II
Party	Candidate	Votes	%	±%
PPP	Tariq Masood Arain	47,405	50.03	
MQM-P	Naeem Akhtar	14,889	15.71	
GDA	Syed Zahid Hussain Shah	11,241	11.86	
PTI	Inayat Ali Rind	8,630	9.11	
PML(N)	Syed Ghulam Muhiuddin Shah	2,975	3.14	
TLP	Junaid Abdul Shakoor	2,855	3.01	
MMA	Najaf Raza	2,328	2.46	
Independent	Nisar Ali Keerio	1,367	1.44	
Independent	Qurban Ali	909	0.96	
Independent	Sardar Sher Muhammad Rind	401	0.42	
Independent	Saeed Khan Jamali	287	0.30	
Independent	Tariq Mehmood Arain	272	0.29	
AAT	Zakir Hussain	216	0.23	
Independent	Noor Muhammad Khaskheli	195	0.21	
PSP	Javed Iqbal Arain S/O Faqeer Muhammad Arain	135	0.14	
Independent	Syed Faseeh Ahmed Shah	117	0.12	
Independent	Karam Ali	115	0.12	
Independent	Irshad Ali Arain	83	0.09	
Independent	Syed Sajjad Hussain Shah Taqvi	83	0.09	
Independent	Shaheen Khan	63	0.07	
Independent	Javed Iqbal S/O Manzoor Ahmed Arain	50	0.05	
Independent	Abdul Razzaq Rustamani	46	0.05	
Independent	Abdul Hafeez Jamali	38	0.04	
Independent	Mir Hassan	36	0.04	
Independent	Mian Abdul Sattar Arain	12	0.01	
Majority		32,516	34.32	
Valid ballots		94,748		
Rejected ballots		4,001		
Turnout		98,749		
Registered electors		223,277		
hold				

== General elections 2013 ==
Contesting candidates	Party affiliation	Votes polled

== General elections 2008 ==
Contesting candidates	Party affiliation	Votes polled

== See also ==
- PS-36 Nawabshah-I
- PS-38 Nawabshah-III
