= PS-34 Naushahro Feroze-III =

Constituency of the Provincial Assembly of Sindh, Pakistan

- Constituency for the Provincial Assembly of Sindh
- Region: Naushahro Feroze Taluka (partly) including Naushahro Feroze city, Moro Tehsil (partly), Kandiaro Tehsil (partly) and Mehrabpur tehsil (partly) of Naushahro Feroze District
- Electorate: 240,138

Current constituency
- Member: Vacant
- Created from: PS-19 Naushahro Feroze-I & PS-20 Naushero Feroze-II (2002-2018); PS-35 Naushahro Feroze-III (2018-2023)

PS-34 Naushahro Feroze-III (پی ایس-34، نوشہروفِيروز-3) is a constituency of the Provincial Assembly of Sindh.

== General elections 2024 ==
Provincial election 2024: PS-34 Naushahro Feroze-III
Party	Candidate	Votes	%	±%
PPP	Mumtaz Ali Chandio	52,385	49.03	
GDA	Shahnawaz Jatoi	46,442	43.47	
TLP	Sardar Ahmed	1,574	1.47	
JI	Muhammad Shabir Khanzada	1,468	1.37	
PRHP	Nasir Ali	1,130	1.06	
Others	Others (twelve candidates)	3,845	3.60	
Turnout		112,317	46.77	
Total valid votes		106,844	95.13	
Rejected ballots		5,473	4.87	
Majority		5,943	5.56	
Registered electors		240,138		
PPP hold				

== General elections 2018 ==
Provincial election 2018: PS-35 Nausharo Feroze-III
Party	Candidate	Votes	%	±%
PPP	Mumtaz Ali	38,440	39.98	
GDA	Razi Ali Khan Jatoi	35,040	36.44	
Independent	Abdul Haq Dost Muhammad	9,232	9.60	
Independent	Mumtaz Ali Chandio	3,365	3.50	
MMA	Abdul Rehman	2,661	2.77	
Independent	Syed Zahid Ali Shah	1,924	2.00	
PRHP	Khalid Hussain	1,124	1.17	
PTI	Amanullah	866	0.90	
TLP	Huma Rajput	575	0.60	
Independent	Allando Shah Alias Zafar Ali Shah	546	0.57	
Independent	Mashoque Ali	431	0.45	
Independent	Aziz Ahmed Behan	231	0.24	
Independent	Ghulam Murtaza Khan Jatoi	211	0.22	
Independent	Zuilfiqar Ali	210	0.22	
Independent	Muhammad Khan	163	0.17	
MQM-P	Muhammad Afzal	153	0.16	
PSP	Syed Kazim Ali Shah	152	0.16	
Independent	Abdul Sattar Rajpar	134	0.14	
Independent	Abrar Hussain	132	0.14	
Independent	Haji Khan Mashori	132	0.14	
Independent	Sikandar Ali	112	0.12	
Independent	Amjad Hussain Rajper	93	0.10	
Independent	Muhammad Ishaque	77	0.08	
Independent	Lutuf Ali	68	0.07	
Independent	Noor Muhammad Khaskheli	40	0.04	
Independent	Munir Ahmed Mubejo	35	0.04	
Majority		3,400	3.54	
Valid ballots		96,147		
Rejected ballots		5,255		
Turnout		101,402		
Registered electors		183,094		
hold				

== General elections 2013 ==
Contesting candidates	Party affiliation	Votes polled

== General elections 2008 ==
Contesting candidates	Party affiliation	Votes polled

== See also ==
- PS-33 Naushahro Feroze-II
- PS-35 Naushahro Feroze-IV
