= PS-61 Hyderabad-II =

Constituency of the Provincial Assembly of Sindh, Pakistan

- Constituency for the Provincial Assembly of Sindh
- Region: Hyderabad Tehsil (partly) of Hyderabad District
- Electorate: 199,760

Current constituency
- Member: Vacant
- Created from: PS-50 Hyderabad-VIII (2002-2018); PS-63 Hyderabad-II (2018-2023)

PS-61 Hyderabad-II (پی ایس-61، حیدرآباد-2) is a constituency of the Provincial Assembly of Sindh.

== General elections 2024 ==
Provincial election 2024: PS-61 Hyderabad-II
Party	Candidate	Votes	%	±%
PPP	Sharjeel Memon	63,079	77.06	
JUI (F)	Saeed Ahmed Talpur	11,368	13.89	
JI	Fateh Muhammad Shoro	2,482	3.03	
TLP	Waqas Shoban	1,243	1.52	
Others	Others (nine candidates)	3,686	4.50	
Turnout		85,035	42.72	
Total valid votes		81,858	96.26	
Rejected ballots		3,177	3.74	
Majority		51,711	63.17	
Registered electors		199,048		
PPP hold				

== General elections 2018 ==
Provincial election 2018: PS-63 Hyderabad-II
Party	Candidate	Votes	%	±%
PPP	Sharjeel Memon	44,265	56.00	
Tabdeeli Pasand Party Pakistan	Muhammad Ali Kazi	22,607	28.60	
MMA	Asif Raza	7,476	9.46	
Independent	Umar Khalil Jan	1,628	2.06	
Independent	Zeenat Inam	746	0.94	
Independent	Zeeshan	579	0.73	
Independent	Muhammad Rizwan	528	0.67	
PP	Habibullah	387	0.49	
MQM-P	Atif Ali	282	0.36	
SUP	Riaz Hussain	143	0.18	
Independent	Qurban Ali Sodhro	126	0.16	
Independent	Hoat Khan	118	0.15	
AAT	Sheeraz Ahmed Shoro	84	0.11	
PST	Javed Rajput	80	0.10	
Majority		21,658	27.40	
Valid ballots		79,049		
Rejected ballots		3,965		
Turnout		83,041		
Registered electors		160,241		
hold				

== General elections 2013 ==
Contesting candidates	Party affiliation	Votes polled

== General elections 2008 ==
Contesting candidates	Party affiliation	Votes polled

== See also ==
- PS-60 Hyderabad-I
- PS-62 Hyderabad-III
