= PS-89 Karachi Malir-VI =

Constituency of the Provincial Assembly of Sindh, Pakistan

- Constituency for the Provincial Assembly of Sindh
- Region: Ibrahim Hyderi and Murad Memon Goth towns (partly) of Malir District in Karachi
- Electorate: 187,503

Current constituency
- Member: Muhammad Saleem Baloch
- Created from: PS-127 Karachi-XXXIX (2002–2018); PS-91 Karachi Malir-V (2018–2023)

PS-89 Karachi Malir-VI (پی ایس-89، کراچی ملير-6) is a constituency of the Provincial Assembly of Sindh.

== General elections 2024 ==
Provincial election 2024: PS-89 Karachi Malir-VI
Party	Candidate	Votes	%	±%
PPP	Muhammad Saleem Baloch	25,326	35.37	
PTI	Ahsan Khattak (Note: Filed nomination papers as PTI candidate but ECP allowed him to run as an Independent)	15,768	22.02	
JI	Shoaib Haider	7,223	10.09	
TLP	Khalid Latif	5,843	8.16	
MQM-P	Hamid Uz Zafar	4,139	5.78	
TLP	Moiddin Junaidi	2,522	3.52	
PML(N)	Ejaz Ahmed	2,501	3.49	
Independent	Muhammad Ashraf Samoo	1,701	2.38	
Independent	Syed Shahid Ali Shah	1,623	2.27	
PRHP	Shakeel Ahmed	805	1.12	
Others	Others (thirthy two candidates)	4,161	5.80	
Turnout		73,154	39.02	
Total valid votes		71,612	97.89	
Rejected ballots		1,542	2.11	
Majority		9,558	13.35	
Registered electors		187,503		
PPP hold				

== General elections 2018 ==
Provincial election 2018: PS-91 Malir-V
Party	Candidate	Votes	%	±%
PPP	Mahmood Alam Jamot	17,880	28.71	
PTI	Khalil ur Rehman Jadoon	12,612	20.25	
Independent	Haji Muzafar Ali Shujra	8,621	13.84	
PML(N)	Malik Muhammad Taj	8,002	12.85	
MMA	Ahsan Ullah	6,929	11.13	
ANP	Siraj Ahmed	2,537	4.07	
TLP	Samiullah Khan	2,064	3.31	
Independent	Syed Imdad Hussain Shah	577	0.93	
Independent	Muhammad Aslam Bhutto	467	0.75	
PML(SB)	Haroon Rasheed	432	0.69	
PMA	Kamal	400	0.64	
MQM-P	Mumtaz Ali	340	0.55	
Independent	Abdul Sattar Hakim	324	0.52	
Tehreek-e-Suba Hazara	Khursheed Ali	306	0.49	
Independent	Asif Khan	227	0.36	
Independent	Nazir Ahmed	214	0.34	
Independent	Sher Ali Khan	144	0.23	
PSP	Muhammad Hanif	109	0.18	
Independent	Rahim Dad Khan	30	0.05	
Independent	Rasool Khan	30	0.05	
Independent	Muhammad Sajid	25	0.04	
Majority		5,268	8.46	
Valid ballots		62,270		
Rejected ballots		2,019		
Turnout		64,289		
Registered electors		144,707		
hold				

== General elections 2013 ==
Contesting candidates	Party affiliation	Votes polled

== General elections 2008 ==
Contesting candidates	Party affiliation	Votes polled

== See also ==
- PS-88 Karachi Malir-V
- PS-90 Karachi Korangi-I
