= Sheikh Abdullah (Pakistani politician) =

Pakistani politician

Member of the Provincial Assembly of Sindh
- Incumbent
- Assumed office 25 February 2024
- Constituency: PS-117 Karachi West-II

Member of the Provincial Assembly of Sindh
- In office 29 May 2013 – 28 May 2018

Personal details
- Born: Karachi, Sindh, Pakistan
- Party: MQM-P (2023-present)
- Other political affiliations: PSP (2016-2023); MQM-L (2013-2016)

Sheikh Abdullah is a Pakistani politician who had been a Member of the Provincial Assembly of Sindh, from May 2013 to May 2018. He was reelected for another term in February 2024.

== Early life and education ==
He was born on 10 July 1965 in Karachi.

He has a degree of Bachelor of Arts from Karachi University.

== Political career ==
He was elected to the Provincial Assembly of Sindh as a candidate of Mutahida Quami Movement from Constituency PS-97 KARACHI-IX in the 2013 Pakistani general election. In March 2017, he quit MQM to join Pak Sarzameen Party. He was reelected to the 16th Provincial Assembly of Sindh as a candidate of the Muttahida Qaumi Movement – Pakistan from Constituency PS-117 Karachi West-II in the 2024 Pakistani general election.
