= Rehana Leghari =

Pakistani politician

Deputy Speaker of the Provincial Assembly of Sindh
- In office 15 August 2018 – 11 August 2023
- Speaker: Agha Siraj Durrani
- Preceded by: Shehla Raza

Member of the Provincial Assembly of Sindh
- In office 13 August 2018 – 11 August 2023
- Constituency: Reserved seat for women
- In office June 2013 – 28 May 2018
- Constituency: Reserved seat for women

Personal details
- Born: Sujawal, Sindh, Pakistan
- Party: PPP (2013-present)

Rehana Leghari is a Pakistani politician who was the Deputy Speaker of the Provincial Assembly of Sindh, in office from August 2018 to August 2023. She had been a Member of the Provincial Assembly of Sindh from August 2018 to August 2023 and from June 2013 to May 2018.

== Early life ==
She was born in 1971 in Sujawal district.

== Political career ==
She was elected to the Provincial Assembly of Sindh as a candidate of Pakistan Peoples Party (PPP) on a reserved seat for women in the 2013 Pakistani general election.

In August 2016, she was inducted into the provincial Sindh cabinet of Chief Minister Syed Murad Ali Shah and was appointed as special assistants to Chief Minister on human rights.

She was re-elected to the Provincial Assembly of Sindh as a candidate of PPP on a reserved seat for women in the 2018 Pakistani general election. Following her successful election, PPP nominated her for the office of deputy speaker of the Sindh Assembly. On 15 August 2018, she was elected as Deputy Speaker of the Provincial Assembly of Sindh. She received 98 votes against her opponent Rabia Azfar Nizami who secured 59 votes.
