= PS-6 Kashmore-III =

Constituency of the Provincial Assembly of Sindh, Pakistan

- Constituency for the Provincial Assembly of Sindh
- Region: Kashmore Tehsil (partly) and Kandhkot Tehsil (partly) of Kashmore District
- Electorate: 191,642

Current constituency
- Member: Vacant
- Created from: PS-16 Jacobabad-IV

PS-6 Kashmore-III (پی ایس-6، کشمور-3) is a constituency of the Provincial Assembly of Sindh.

== General elections 2024 ==
Provincial election 2024: PS-6 Kashmore-III
Party	Candidate	Votes	%	±%
PPP	Mir Mehboob Ali Khan Bijarani	86,365	85.28	
JUI (F)	Abdul Qayoom	9,945	9.82	
PML(N)	Abdul Nabi	2,526	2.49	
Others	Others (nine candidates)	2,433	2.41	
Turnout		105,896	55.26	
Total valid votes		101,269	95.63	
Rejected ballots		4,627	4.37	
Majority		76,420	75.46	
Registered electors		191,642		

== General elections 2018 ==
Contesting candidates	Party affiliation	Votes polled

== General elections 2013 ==
Contesting candidates	Party affiliation	Votes polled

== General elections 2008 ==
Contesting candidates	Party affiliation	Votes polled

== See also ==
- PS-5 Kashmore-II
- PS-7 Shikarpur-I
