= PS-127 Karachi Central-VI =

Constituency of the Provincial Assembly of Sindh, Pakistan

- Constituency for the Provincial Assembly of Sindh
- Region: Liaquatabad Town (partly) and Nazimabad Town (partly) of Karachi Central District in Karachi
- Electorate: 269,874

Current constituency
- Member: Vacant
- Created from: PS-107 Karachi-XIX (2002-2018); PS-127 Karachi Central-V (2018-2023)

PS-127 Karachi Central-VI (پی ایس-127، کراچی وسطی-6) is a constituency of the Provincial Assembly of Sindh.

== General elections 2024 ==
Provincial election 2024: PS-127 Karachi Central-VI
Party	Candidate	Votes	%	±%
MQM-P	Muhammad Maaz Mehboob	23,493	37.68	
JI	Muhammad Masood Ali	12,673	20.33	
PTI	Shaikh Mehboob Jilani (Note: Filed nomination papers as PTI candidate but ECP allowed him to run as an Independent)	10,395	16.67	
TLP	Salman Haider	5,288	8.48	
Independent	Osama Anjum Alim	4,322	6.93	
PPP	Rizwan Rafique	2,538	4.07	
Others	Others (sixteen candidates)	3,637	5.84	
Turnout		63,575	25.88	
Total valid votes		62,346	98.07	
Rejected ballots		1,229	1.93	
Majority		10,820	17.35	
Registered electors		245,634		
MQM-P hold				

== General elections 2018 ==
Provincial election 2018: PS-127 Karachi Central-V
Party	Candidate	Votes	%	±%
MQM-P	Kanwar Naveed Jamil	29,939	38.53	
PTI	Shaikh Mehboob Jilani	14,424	18.56	
TLP	Mohammed Adeel	12,973	16.69	
PSP	Syed Mustafa Kamal	6,385	8.22	
PPP	Sadam Abdul Samad	3,740	4.81	
MMA	Muhammad Siddiq Rathore	3,676	4.73	
PML(N)	Shaheen	2,922	3.76	
APML	Kousar Shaheen	1,174	1.51	
PMA	Muhammad Younis	658	0.85	
ANP	Abdul Razzaq	503	0.65	
Independent	Hafiz Hifz Ur Rehman	466	0.60	
MQM-H	Faizan khan	189	0.24	
Independent	Asghar Ali	146	0.19	
ANP	Irshad Ali	120	0.15	
Independent	Abdul Samad Sardar	115	0.15	
PP	Asif Ahmed	77	0.10	
Independent	Muhammad Zubair Yaseen	54	0.07	
Independent	Naseem Khan	50	0.06	
Independent	Muhammad Asghar Ali	43	0.06	
Independent	Muhammad Kamran Khan	32	0.04	
Independent	Ashraf Ali	25	0.03	
Majority		15,515	19.97	
Valid ballots		77,711		
Rejected ballots		976		
Turnout		78,687		
Registered electors		222,764		
hold				

== General elections 2013 ==
Contesting candidates	Party affiliation	Votes polled

== General elections 2008 ==
Contesting candidates	Party affiliation	Votes polled

== See also ==
- PS-126 Karachi Central-V
- PS-128 Karachi Central-VII
