= PS-118 Karachi West-III =

Constituency of the Provincial Assembly of Sindh, Pakistan

- Constituency for the Provincial Assembly of Sindh
- Region: Orangi Town (partly) and Manghopir town (partly) of Karachi West District in Karachi
- Electorate: 107,939

Current constituency
- Member: Vacant
- Created from: PS-93 Karachi-V (2002-2018); PS-119 Karachi West-VIII (2018-2023)

PS-118 Karachi West-III (پی ایس-118، کراچی غربی-3) is a constituency of the Provincial Assembly of Sindh.

== General elections 2024 ==
Provincial election 2024: PS-118 Karachi West-III
Party	Candidate	Votes	%	±%
MQM-P	Naseer Ahmed	9,740	26.02	
Independent	Salih Zada (Note: Filed nomination papers as PTI candidate but ECP allowed him to run as an Independent)	7,136	19.07	
PPP	Jan Muhammad Gabool	6,971	18.62	
JI	Abdul Majeed	3,541	9.46	
JUI (F)	Muhammad Khalid	3,404	9.09	
TLP	Shaukat Khan	1,458	3.90	
BNP (M)	Ahmed Jan	632	1.69	
PRHP	Muhammad Dawood	623	1.66	
ANP	Amir Nawab	622	1.66	
Independent	Jamshed Ahmed Khan	360	0.96	
Independent	Abdul Saleem	358	0.96	
Independent	Arshad Ali	249	0.67	
IPP	Wahid Ali Khan	249	0.67	
Independent	Abdul Qayyum	239	0.64	
Others	Others (twenty candidates)	1,848	4.93	
Turnout		38,577	35.74	
Total valid votes		37,430	97.03	
Rejected ballots		1,147	2.97	
Majority		2,604	6.95	
Registered electors		107,939		
MQM-P hold				

== General elections 2018 ==
Provincial election 2018: PS-119 Karachi West-VIII
Party	Candidate	Votes	%	±%
MQM-P	Ali Khurshidi	23,532	31.94	
PTI	Shakeel Akhter	12,841	17.43	
TLP	Fatima	11,746	15.94	
PPP	Zahir Shah	7,733	10.50	
MMA	Ata E Rabbi	7,514	10.20	
PSP	Mehboob Alam	2,989	4.06	
PML(N)	Syed Nadeem	2,349	3.19	
PMA	Mehfooz Ullah	1,368	1.86	
APML	Muhammad Farooq	868	1.18	
ANP	Murad Khan	649	0.88	
Independent	Mujasil	497	0.67	
Independent	Muhammad Asif	468	0.64	
AAT	Zahid Anwar	313	0.42	
Independent	Jaffar Alam	280	0.38	
GDA	Sohail Baig	137	0.19	
Independent	Riaz Ahmed	134	0.18	
Independent	Asmatullah	119	0.16	
Independent	Muhammad Maqbool Khan	57	0.08	
Independent	Amir hameed Abbasi	38	0.05	
Independent	Zubaida Wahid	23	0.03	
Independent	Abdul Hannan Khan	18	0.02	
Majority		10,691	14.51	
Valid ballots		73,673		
Rejected ballots		2,061		
Turnout		75,734		
Registered electors		173,751		
hold				

== General elections 2013 ==
Contesting candidates	Party affiliation	Votes polled
Arbab Alamgir Khan Arbab Najeeb Ullah Khan Khalil and 9 other|| Pakistan Peoples Party Parliamentarians Awami National Party and other|| Out: 77892 Valid: 76293 Rejected: 2003

== General elections 2008 ==
Contesting candidates	Party affiliation	Votes polled

== See also ==
- PS-117 Karachi West-II
- PS-119 Karachi West-IV
