= Muhammad Ali Malkani =

Pakistani politician

Member of the Provincial Assembly of Sindh
- In office 13 August 2018 – 11 August 2023
- Constituency: PS-76 Sujawal-II
- In office 29 May 2013 – 28 May 2018

Personal details
- Born: 22 November 1966 (age 59)
- Party: PPP (2013-present)

Muhammad Ali Malkani is a Pakistani politician who had been a member of the Provincial Assembly of Sindh from August 2017 to August 2023 and from May 2013 to May 2018.

== Early life and education ==
He was born on 22 November 1966.

He has done graduation.

== Political career ==
He was elected to the Provincial Assembly of Sindh as a candidate of Pakistan Peoples Party from Constituency PS-87 THATTA-IV in the 2013 Pakistani general election. Prior to 2016 he served in cabinet as Minister for Industries and before that Minister of tourism. In August 2016, he was into Sindh's provincial cabinet of Chief Minister Syed Murad Ali Shah and was made Provincial Minister of Sindh for livestock and fisheries. In May 2017, he was given the additional ministerial portfolio of Environment, Climate Change and Coastal Development.

Furthermore, he was elected MPA from Ps-74 Sujawal (II) and was inducted to the cabinet of Syed Murad Ali shah and given portfolio of Universities and boards till current day. In a later cabinet reshuffle on 15 November 2024 Muhammad Ali Malkani was made the Provincial Minister for Livestock and Fisheries.
