= Abdul Rauf Khosa =

Pakistani politician

Member of the Provincial Assembly of Sindh
- In office 13 August 2018 – 11 August 2023
- Constituency: PS-4 Kashmore-I
- In office 29 May 2013 – 28 May 2018
- Constituency: PS-18 Kashmore-II

Personal details
- Born: 5 February 1960 (age 66) Kashmore, Sindh, Pakistan
- Party: PPP (2013-present)

Abdul Rauf Khosa (Urdu: عبدالرؤوف کھوسہ) is a Pakistani politician who had been a member of the Provincial Assembly of Sindh from August 2018 till August 2023. He previously had served in this role from May 2013 to May 2018.

== Early life ==
Abdul Rauf Khosa was born on 5 February 1960.

== Political career ==
He was elected to the Provincial Assembly of Sindh as a candidate of Pakistan Peoples Party (PPP) from PS-18 Kashmore-II in the 2013 Sindh provincial election.

He was re-elected to Provincial Assembly of Sindh as a candidate of PPP from PS-4 Kashmore-I in the 2018 Sindh provincial election.
