= Mumtaz Hussain Khan Jakhrani =

Pakistani politician (born 1973)

Sardarzada Mir Mumtaz Hussain Khan Jakhrani

Member of the Provincial Assembly of Sindh
- In office 13 August 2018 – 11 August 2023
- Constituency: PS-3 Jacobabad-III
- In office 29 May 2013 – 28 May 2018
- Constituency: PS-13 Jacobabad-I

Personal details
- Born: 8 March 1973 (age 53) Jacobabad Tehsil, Sindh, Pakistan
- Party: PPP (2013-present)

Mir Mumtaz Hussain Khan Jakhrani (born 8 March 1973) is a Pakistani politician who had been a member of the Provincial Assembly of Sindh from 2013 till August 2018. He Then Again served in this role from July 2018 to August 2023 and is also currently serving from 2024 to 2029.

== Early life ==
He was born on 8 March 1973 in Jacobabad Taluka. His father Sardar Naik Muhammad Khan was chief of the Jakhrani tribe. Currently his elder brother Sardar Dàad Muhammad is the sardar of the Jakhrani tribe.

== Political career ==
He was elected to the Provincial Assembly of Sindh as a candidate of Pakistan Peoples Party (PPP) from Constituency PS-13 Jacobabad-I in the 2013 Sindh provincial election.

He was re-elected to Provincial Assembly of Sindh as a candidate of PPP from PS-3 (Jacobabad-III) in the 2018 Sindh provincial election.
