= Abdul Karim Soomro =

Pakistani politician

- عبدالڪريم سومرو

Member of the Provincial Assembly of Sindh
- In office 13 August 2018 – 11 August 2023
- Constituency: PS-69 Tando Muhammad Khan-II
- In office 2008 – 28 May 2018
- Constituency: PS-54 Tando Muhammad Khan-cum-Badin

Personal details
- Born: 3 November 1962 (age 63)
- Party: PPP (2008-present)

Abdul Karim Soomro (Sindhi: عبدالڪريم سومرو) is a Pakistani politician who had been a Member of the Provincial Assembly of Sindh from August 2018 to Ausgut 2023 and from 2008 to May 2018.

== Early life and education ==
He was born on 3 November 1962.

He is a graduate.

== Political career ==
He was elected to the Provincial Assembly of Sindh as a candidate of Pakistan Peoples Party (PPP) from Constituency PS-54 (Tando Muhammad Khan-Cum-Badin) in the 2008 Pakistani general election. He received 26,082 votes and defeated Sayed Muhammad Kamil Shah, a candidate of Pakistan Muslim League (Q) (PML-Q).

He was re-elected to the Provincial Assembly of Sindh as a candidate of PPP from Constituency PS-54 (Tando Muhammad Khan-cum-Badin) in the 2013 Pakistani general election. He received 35,444 votes and defeated an independent candidate, Syed Shabbir Hyder Shah.

He was re-elected to Provincial Assembly of Sindh as a candidate of PPP from Constituency PS-69 (Tando Muhammad Khan-II) in the 2018 Pakistani general election.
