= Jam Khan Shoro =

Pakistani politician

- ڄام خان شورو
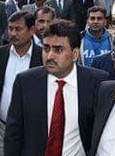
- Jam Khan Shoro

Provincial Minister of Sindh for Irrigation
- Incumbent
- Assumed office 12 March 2024

Member of the Provincial Assembly of Sindh
- Incumbent
- Assumed office 25 February 2024
- Constituency: PS-62 Hyderabad-I
- In office 13 August 2018 – 11 August 2023
- Constituency: PS-62 Hyderabad-I
- In office 29 May 2013 – 28 May 2018
- Constituency: PS-47 (Hyderabad-III)

Personal details
- Born: 5 March 1982 (age 44) Hyderabad, Sindh, Pakistan
- Party: PPP (2013-present)
- Relations: Kashif Shoro (brother)

Jam Khan Shoro (Sindhi: ڄام خان شورو; born 5 March 1982) is a Pakistani politician who had been a Member of the Provincial Assembly of Sindh from August 2018 till August 2023. Previously he was member of the Sindh Assembly from May 2013 to May 2018.

== Early life and education ==
He was born on 5 March 1982 in Hyderabad, Pakistan.

He has a degree of Bachelor of Laws and a degree of Bachelor of Commerce.

In 2008, he was co-accused of physically torturing a policeman.

== Political career ==
He was elected to the Provincial Assembly of Sindh as a candidate of Pakistan Peoples Party (PPP) from Constituency PS-47 (Hyderabad-III) in the 2013 Pakistani general election. In June 2013, he was inducted into Sindh's provincial cabinet of Chief Minister Syed Qaim Ali Shah and was made Provincial Minister of Sindh for livestock and fisheries. In November 2015, Provincial Minister of Sindh for local government.

In July 2016, he was into Sindh's provincial cabinet of Chief Minister Syed Murad Ali Shah and was made Provincial Minister of Sindh for local government.

He was re-elected to Provincial Assembly of Sindh as a candidate of PPP from Constituency PS-62 (Hyderabad-I) in the 2018 Pakistani general election.

In October 2018, the National Accountability Bureau (NAB) issued arrest warrants for Khan for illegally allotting 19 plots of the Karachi Development Authority worth Rs1 billion.
