= Muhammad Saleem Baloch =

Pakistani politician

Special Assistant to the CM on Public Health Engineering and Rural Development
- Incumbent
- Assumed office 15 November 2024

Member of the Provincial Assembly of Sindh
- Incumbent
- Assumed office 25 February 2024
- Constituency: PS-89 Karachi Malir-VI

Member of the Provincial Assembly of Sindh
- In office 13 August 2018 – 11 August 2023
- Constituency: PS-89 (Malir-III)

Personal details
- Party: PPP (2018-present)

Muhammad Saleem Kalmati is a Pakistani politician who is member of the Provincial Assembly of Sindh, and also a special assistant to CM Sindh.

== Political career ==
He was also elected to the Provincial Assembly of Sindh as a candidate of Pakistan Peoples Party (PPP) from Constituency PS-89 (Malir-III) in the 2018 Pakistani general election. He received 23,923 votes and defeated Syed Ali Hussain, a candidate of Pakistan Tehreek-e-Insaf (PTI).
