= Ghulam Qadir Chandio =

Pakistani politician

Member of the Provincial Assembly of Sindh
- In office 13 August 2018 – 11 August 2023
- Constituency: PS-39 Nawabshah-III
- In office 29 May 2013 – 28 May 2018

Personal details
- Born: 15 October 1959 (age 66)
- Party: PPP (2013-present)

Ghulam Qadir Chandio (born 15 October 1959) is a Pakistani politician who had been a member of the Provincial Assembly of Sindh from August 2018 till August 2023 and from May 2013 to May 2018.

== Early life and education ==
He was born on 15 October 1959.

He has a degree of Master of Arts in Political Science and a degree of Bachelors of Arts.

== Political career ==
He was elected to the Provincial Assembly of Sindh as a candidate of Pakistan Peoples Party (PPP) from Constituency PS-27 SHAHEED BANAZIR ABAD-IV in the 2013 Pakistani general election.

He was re-elected to Provincial Assembly of Sindh as a candidate of PPP from Constituency PS-39 (Shaheed Benazirabad-III) in the 2018 Pakistani general election.
