= Muhammad Wajahat =

Pakistani politician (1970–2018)

Member of the Provincial Assembly of Sindh
- In office 13 August 2018 – 27 November 2018
- Constituency: PS-94 (Korangi Karachi-III)

Personal details
- Party: Muttahida Qaumi Movement

Muhammad Wajahat was a Pakistani politician who was a member of the Provincial Assembly of Sindh from August to November 2018.

== Early life and education ==
He was born on 15 December 1970 in Karachi, Pakistan.

He did B.Com. from the Karachi University.

== Political career ==
He had been associated with Muttahida Qaumi Movement (MQM since mid-1990s.

He was serving as "joint in-charge" of Korangi town of the MQM before getting elected to the Provincial Assembly of Sindh as a candidate of MQM from Constituency PS-94 (Korangi Karachi-III) in the 2018 Pakistani general election.

He died on 27 November 2018.
