= Rabia Azfar Nizami =

Pakistani politician

Rabia Azfar Nizami is a Pakistani politician who had been a member of the Provincial Assembly of Sindh from August 2018 to August 2023.

Born on 18 Dec 1971 did Bachelor of Engineering from Dawood College of Engineering and Technology, 26 years of IT Career, Alma mater of Microsoft and Education Activist. Rabia is also a Member Orphanage Board of Sindh Social Welfare Department and Member of Education Steering Committee of Sindh. She is also an Education Activist with a keen interest in public education reforms in Sindh, she wrote many articles on education issues in Sindh province. Rabia Azfar raise her voice for education on many platforms. She also works for issues related to Child Protection and Child Rights and Thalassemia.

== Political career ==
She was elected to the Provincial Assembly of Sindh as a candidate of Pakistan Tehreek-e-Insaf (PTI) on a reserved seat for women which was on the base of a quota in the 2018 Pakistani general election. Following her successful election, PTI nominated her for the office of Deputy Speaker of Provincial Assembly of Sindh. On 15 August 2018, she received 59 votes and lost the seat to Rehana Leghari who secured 98 votes.
