= Zia Ul Hassan Lanjar =

Pakistani politician

- ضياءَ الحسن لنجار

Member of the Provincial Assembly of Sindh
- In office March 2016 – 28 May 2018
- Constituency: PS-23 Naushero Feroze-V

Personal details
- Born: 28 July 1974 (age 51) Nawabshah, Sindh, Pakistan
- Party: PPP (2016-present)

Zia Ul Hassan Lanjar (Sindhi: ضياءَ الحسن لنجار; born 28 July 1974) is a Pakistani politician who had been a Member of the Provincial Assembly of Sindh from March 2016 to May 2018.

== Early life and education ==
He was born on 28 July 1974 in Nawabshah.

He has a degree of Bachelor of Arts, a degree of Bachelor of Laws and a degree of Master of Laws, all from Sindh University.

== Political career ==
He was elected to the Provincial Assembly of Sindh as a candidate of Pakistan Peoples Party from Constituency PS-23 NAUSHERO FEROZE-V in by-polls held in March 2016.
