= Nasir Hussain Qureshi =

Pakistani politician

Member of the Provincial Assembly of Sindh
- In office 13 August 2018 – 11 August 2023
- Constituency: PS-67 Hyderabad-VI

Personal details
- Born: Hyderabad, Sindh, Pakistan
- Party: MQM-P (2018-present)

Nasir Hussain Qureshi is a Pakistani politician who had been a member of the Provincial Assembly of Sindh from August 2018 till August 2023.

== Political career ==
He was elected to the Provincial Assembly of Sindh as a candidate of Muttahida Qaumi Movement from Constituency PS-67 (Hyderabad-VI) in the 2018 Pakistani general election.
