= Imtiaz Ahmed Shaikh =

Pakistani politician

- امتياز احمد شيخ

Provincial Minister of Sindh for Energy
- In office 5 September 2018 – 11 August 2023

Member of the Provincial Assembly of Sindh
- In office 13 August 2018 – 11 August 2023
- Constituency: PS-7 Shikarpur-I
- In office 29 May 2013 – 28 May 2018
- Constituency: PS-11 (Shikarpur-I)

Personal details
- Party: PPP (2013-present)

Imtiaz Ahmed Shaikh (Sindhi: امتياز احمد شيخ) is a Pakistani politician who was the Provincial Minister of Sindh for Energy from September 2018 to August 2023. He was a member of the Provincial Assembly of Sindh from August 2018 to August 2023 and before that a member of the Provincial Assembly of Sindh from May 2013 to May 2018.

== Political career ==
He was elected to the Provincial Assembly of Sindh as a candidate of Pakistan Peoples Party (PPP) from Constituency PS-11 (Shikarpur-I) in the 2013 Sindh provincial election.

He was re-elected to Provincial Assembly of Sindh as a candidate of PPP from Constituency PS-7 (Shikarpur-I) in the 2018 Sindh provincial election.

On 5 September 2018, he was inducted into the provincial Sindh cabinet of Chief Minister Syed Murad Ali Shah and was appointed as Provincial Minister of Sindh for Energy.
