= Mumtaz Ali Chandio =

Pakistani politician

Member of the Provincial Assembly of Sindh
- In office 13 August 2018 – 11 August 2023
- Constituency: PS-35 Naushahro Feroze-III

Personal details
- Party: PPP (2018-present)

Mumtaz Ali Chandio is a Pakistani politician who had been a member of the Provincial Assembly of Sindh from August 2018 till August 2023. He is now again elected as Member of Provincial Assembly of Pakistan in 2024 elections.

== Political career ==
He was elected to the Provincial Assembly of Sindh as a candidate of Pakistan Peoples Party from Constituency PS-35 (Naushahro Feroze-III) in the 2018 Pakistani general election.
