= Syed Aijaz Hussain Shah =

Pakistani politician

- سيد اعجاز حسين شاھ

Member of the Provincial Assembly of Sindh
- In office 13 August 2018 – 11 August 2023
- Constituency: PS-68 (Tando Muhammad Khan-I)

Personal details
- Party: PPP (2018-present)

Syed Aijaz Hussain Shah (Sindhi: سيد اعجاز حسين شاھ) is a Pakistani politician who has been a member of the Provincial Assembly of Sindh since August 2018.

== Political career ==
He was elected to the Provincial Assembly of Sindh as a candidate of the Pakistan Peoples Party from Constituency PS-68 (Tando Muhammad Khan-I) in the 2018 Pakistani general election.
