= List of members of the 16th Provincial Assembly of Sindh =

The List of members of the 16th Provincial Assembly of Sindh is the list of all the members elected to the 16th Provincial Assembly of Sindh. The assembly was constituted following the 2024 provincial election held in Sindh, and its term is to last until 2029. The election officially resulted in a landslide majority of 115 seats being won by the Pakistan Peoples Party (PPP) resulting in the creation of the Second Murad Ali Shah ministry.

Following the February 2024 election in Sindh, the Pakistan Tehreek-e-Insaf (PTI), Grand Democratic Alliance (GDA), Jaamat-e-Islami (JI) and Sunni Ittehad Council (SIC) bashed the election as rigged in favor of the PPP and the Muttahida Qaumi Movement – Pakistan (MQM-P). As a result, Jamaat-e-Islami leader Hafiz Naeem ur Rehman forfeited his own seat saying it had been rigged for him to win against a PTI candidate. Pir Pagara's Grand Democratic Alliance forfeited both of its two seats in protest, alleging that the PPP had rigged seats in rural Sindh.

== Elected members ==
District	Constituency	Party		Member	Ref
Jacobabad	PS-1 Jacobabad-I		PPP	Sher Muhammad Khan Mugheri	
Jacobabad	PS-2 Jacobabad-II		PPP	Sohrab Khan Sarki	
Jacobabad	PS-3 Jacobabad-III		PPP	Mumtaz Hussain Khan	
Kashmore	PS-4 Kashmore-I		PPP	Abdul Rauf Khoso	
Kashmore	PS-5 Kashmore-II		PPP	Ghulam Abid Khan	
Kashmore	PS-6 Kashmore-III		PPP	Mir Mehboob Ali Khan Bijarani	
Shikarpur	PS-7 Shikarpur-I		PPP	Imtiaz Ahmed Shaikh	
Shikarpur	PS-8 Shikarpur-II		PPP	Muhammad Arif Khan Mahar	
Shikarpur	PS-9 Shikarpur-III		PPP	Agha Shahbaz Ali Durrani	
Larkana	PS-10 Larkana-I		PPP	Faryal Talpur	
Larkana	PS-11 Larkana-II		PPP	Jameel Ahmed Soomro	
Larkana	PS-12 Larkana-III		PPP	Sohail Anwar Siyal	
Larkana	PS-13 Larkana-IV		PPP	Adil Altaf Unnar	
Qambar Shahdadkot	PS-14 Qambar Shahdadkot-I		PPP	Mir Nadir Ali Khan Magsi	
Qambar Shahdadkot	PS-15 Qambar Shahdadkot-II		PPP	Nisar Khuhro	
Qambar Shahdadkot	PS-16 Qambar Shahdadkot-III		PPP	Nawab Ghaibi Sardar Khan Chandio	
Qambar Shahdadkot	PS-17 Qambar Shahdadkot-IV		PPP	Burhan Chandio	
Ghotki	PS-18 Ghotki-I		PPP	Jam Mehtab Hussain Dahar	
Ghotki	PS-19 Ghotki-II		MQM-P	Sardar Nadir Akmal Khan Leghari	
Ghotki	PS-20 Ghotki-III		SIC	Sardar Muhammad Bakhsh Khan Mahar	
Ghotki	PS-21 Ghotki-IV		SIC	Ali Nawaz Khan Mahar	
Sukkur	PS-22 Sukkur-I		PPP	Ikramullah Khan Dharejo	
Sukkur	PS-23 Sukkur-II		PPP	Awais Qadir Shah	
Sukkur	PS-24 Sukkur-III		PPP	Syed Farukh Ahmed Shah	
Sukkur	PS-25 Sukkur-IV		PPP	Nasir Hussain Shah	
Khairpur	PS-26 Khairpur-I		PPP	Syed Qaim Ali Shah	
Khairpur	PS-27 Khairpur-II		PPP	Hallar Wassan	
Khairpur	PS-28 Khairpur-III		PPP	Sajid Ali Banbhan	
Khairpur	PS-29 Khairpur-IV		PPP	Shiraz Shaukat Rajpar	
Khairpur	PS-30 Khairpur-V		PPP	Asfandyar Khan Kharal	
Khairpur	PS-31 Khairpur-VI		GDA	Muhammad Rashid Shah	
Naushahro Feroze	PS-32 Naushahro Feroze-I		PPP	Syed Serfraz Hussain Shah	
Naushahro Feroze	PS-33 Naushahro Feroze-II		PPP	Syed Hassan Ali Shah	
Naushahro Feroze	PS-34 Naushahro Feroze-III		PPP	Mumtaz Ali Chandio	
Naushahro Feroze	PS-35 Naushahro Feroze-IV		PPP	Zia Ul Hassan Lanjar	
Shaheed Benazirabad	PS-36 Shaheed Benazirabad-I		PPP	Azra Fazal Pechuho	
Shaheed Benazirabad	PS-37 Shaheed Benazirabad-II		PPP	Chaudhary Javed Iqbal Arain	
Shaheed Benazirabad	PS-38 Shaheed Benazirabad-III		PPP	Ghulam Qadir Chandio	
Shaheed Benazirabad	PS-39 Shaheed Benazirabad-IV		PPP	Bahadur Khan Dahri	
Sanghar	PS-40 Sanghar-I		GDA	Ghulam Dastageer Rajar	
Sanghar	PS-41 Sanghar-II		PPP	Ali Hassan Hingorjo	
Sanghar	PS-42 Sanghar-III		PPP	Jam Shabbir Ali Khan	
Sanghar	PS-43 Sanghar-IV		PPP	Sardar Paras Dero	
Sanghar	PS-44 Sanghar-V		PPP	Shahid Abdul Salam Thahim	
Mirpur Khas	PS-45 Mirpur Khas-I		PPP	Hari Ram	
Mirpur Khas	PS-46 Mirpur Khas-II		PPP	Syed Zulfiqar Ali Shah	
Mirpur Khas	PS-47 Mirpur Khas-III		PPP	Noor Ahmed Bhurgri	
Mirpur Khas	PS-48 Mirpur Khas-IV		PPP	Mir Tariq Ali Khan Talpur	
Umarkot	PS-49 Umerkot-I		PPP	Syed Sardar Ali Shah	
Umarkot	PS-50 Umerkot-II		PPP	Syed Ameer Ali Shah	
Umarkot	PS-51 Umerkot-III		PPP	Nawab Muhammad Taimur Talpur	
Tharparkar	PS-52 Tharparkar-I		PPP	Dost Muhammad Rahimoon	
Tharparkar	PS-53 Tharparkar-II		PPP	Muhammad Qasim Soomro	
Tharparkar	PS-54 Tharparkar-III		PPP	Fakeer Sher Muhammad Bilalani	
Tharparkar	PS-55 Tharparkar-IV		PPP	Arbab Lutfullah	
Matiari	PS-56 Matiari-I		PPP	Makhdoom Mehboob Zaman	
Matiari	PS-57 Matiari-II		PPP	Makhdoom Fakhar Zaman	
Tando Allahyar	PS-58 Tando Allahyar-I		PPP	Syed Zia Abbas Shah	
Tando Allahyar	PS-59 Tando Allahyar-II		PPP	Imdad Ali Pitafi	
Hyderabad	PS-60 Hyderabad-I		PPP	Jam Khan Shoro	
Hyderabad	PS-61 Hyderabad-II		PPP	Sharjeel Memon	
Hyderabad	PS-62 Hyderabad-III		MQM-P	Sabir Hussain Qaimkhani	
Hyderabad	PS-63 Hyderabad-IV		SIC	Rehan Rajpoot	
Hyderabad	PS-64 Hyderabad-V		MQM-P	Muhammad Rashid Khan	
Hyderabad	PS-65 Hyderabad-VI		MQM-P	Nasir Hussain Qureshi	
Tando Muhammad Khan	PS-66 Tando Muhammad Khan-I		PPP	Syed Aijaz Hussain Shah	
Tando Muhammad Khan	PS-67 Tando Muhammad Khan-II		PPP	Khurram Karim Soomro	
Badin	PS-68 Badin-I		PPP	Muhammad Halepoto	
Badin	PS-69 Badin-II		PPP	Allah Bux Talpur	
Badin	PS-70 Badin-III		PPP	Sardar Arbab Ameer Amanullah Khan	
Badin	PS-71 Badin-IV		PPP	Taj Muhammad Mallah	
Badin	PS-72 Badin-V		PPP	Ismail Rahoo	
Sujawal	PS-73 Sujawal-I		PPP	Shah Hussain Shah Sheerazi	
Sujawal	PS-74 Sujawal-II		PPP	Muhammad Ali Malkani	
Thatta	PS-75 Thatta-I		PPP	Riaz Hussain Shah Sheerazi	
Thatta	PS-76 Thatta-II		PPP	Ali Hassan Zardari	
Jamshoro	PS-77 Jamshoro-I		PPP	Murad Ali Shah	
Jamshoro	PS-78 Jamshoro-II		PPP	Sikandar Ali Shoro	
Jamshoro	PS-79 Jamshoro-III		PPP	Malik Sikandar Khan	
Dadu	PS-80 Dadu-I		PPP	Zubair Ahmed Junejo	
Dadu	PS-81 Dadu-II		PPP	Fayaz Ali Butt	
Dadu	PS-82 Dadu-III		PPP	Pir Mujeeb ul Haq	
Dadu	PS-83 Dadu-IV		PPP	Pir Saleh Shah Jeelani	
Karachi	PS-84 Karachi Malir-I		PPP	Muhammad Yousuf Murtaza Baloch	
Karachi	PS-85 Karachi Malir-II		PPP	Muhammad Sajid Jokhio	
Karachi	PS-86 Karachi Malir-III		PPP	Abdul Razak Raja	
Karachi	PS-87 Karachi Malir-IV		PPP	Mehmood Alam Jamot	
Karachi	PS-88 Karachi Malir-V		PPP	Ajaz Khan Swati	
Karachi	PS-89 Karachi Malir-VI		PPP	Muhammad Saleem Baloch	
Karachi	PS-90 Karachi Korangi-I		MQM-P	Syed Shariq Jamal	
Karachi	PS-91 Karachi Korangi-II		JIP	Muhammad Farooq Farhan	
Karachi	PS-92 Karachi Korangi-III		SIC	Wajid Hussain Khan	
Karachi	PS-93 Karachi Korangi-IV		SIC	Sajid Hussain Mir	
Karachi	PS-94 Karachi Korangi-V		MQM-P	Najam Mirza	
Karachi	PS-95 Karachi Korangi-VI		PPP	Muhammad Farooq Awan	
Karachi	PS-96 Karachi Korangi-VII		SIC	Muhammad Owais	
Karachi	PS-97 Karachi East-I		MQM-P	Rana Shoukat Ali	
Karachi	PS-98 Karachi East-II		MQM-P	Arsalan Perwaiz Siddiqui	
Karachi	PS-99 Karachi East-III		MQM-P	Syed Farhan Ansari	
Karachi	PS-100 Karachi East-IV		MQM-P	Syed Muhammad Usman	
Karachi	PS-101 Karachi East-V		MQM-P	Moeed Anwar	
Karachi	PS-102 Karachi East-VI		MQM-P	Muhammad Aamir Siddiqui	
Karachi	PS-103 Karachi East-VII		MQM-P	Faisal Rafiq	
Karachi	PS-104 Karachi East-VIII		MQM-P	Muhammad Daniyal	
Karachi	PS-105 Karachi East-IX		PPP	Saeed Ghani	
Karachi	PS-106 Karachi South-I		SIC	Sajjad Ali Soomro	
Karachi	PS-107 Karachi South-II		PPP	Muhammad Yousuf Baloch	
Karachi	PS-108 Karachi South-III		MQM-P	Muhammad Dilawar	
Karachi	PS-109 Karachi South-IV		SIC	Bilal Hussain Khan Jadoon	
Karachi	PS-110 Karachi South-V		SIC	Rehan Bandukda	
Karachi	PS-111 Karachi Keamari-I		PPP	Liaquat Ali Askani	
Karachi	PS-112 Karachi Keamari-II		PPP	Muhammad Asif	
Karachi	PS-113 Karachi Keamari-III		MQM-P	Faheem Ahmed Patni	
Karachi	PS-114 Karachi Keamari-IV		SIC	Muhammad Shabbir Qureshi	
Karachi	PS-115 Karachi Keamari-V		PPP	Muhammad Asif Khan	
Karachi	PS-116 Karachi West-I		PPP	Ali Ahmed Jan	
Karachi	PS-117 Karachi West-II		MQM-P	Sheikh Abdullah	
Karachi	PS-118 Karachi West-III		MQM-P	Naseer Ahmed	
Karachi	PS-119 Karachi West-IV		MQM-P	Ali Khursheedi	
Karachi	PS-120 Karachi West-V		MQM-P	Mazahir Amir Khan	
Karachi	PS-121 Karachi West-VI		MQM-P	Syed Ejaz Ul Haque	
Karachi	PS-122 Karachi Central-I		MQM-P	Rehan Akram Mirza	
Karachi	PS-123 Karachi Central-II		MQM-P	Abdul Waseem	
Karachi	PS-124 Karachi Central-III		MQM-P	Abdul Basit	
Karachi	PS-125 Karachi Central-IV		MQM-P	Syed Adil Askari	
Karachi	PS-126 Karachi Central-V		MQM-P	Iftikhar Alam	
Karachi	PS-127 Karachi Central-VI		MQM-P	Muhammad Maaz Mehboob	
Karachi	PS-128 Karachi Central-VII		MQM-P	Taha Ahmed Khan	
Karachi	PS-129 Karachi Central-VIII	bgcolor=“#C80000	MQM-P	Maaz Mukaddam	
Karachi	PS-130 Karachi Central-IX		MQM-P	Jamal Ahmed	
Reserved Seats	Women		PPP	Arooba Rashid Rabbani	
Reserved Seats	Women		PPP	Bibi Yasmeen Shah	
Reserved Seats	Women		PPP	Farzana Hanif Baloch	
Reserved Seats	Women		MQM-P	Heer Soho	
Reserved Seats	Women		PPP	Hina Dastagir	
Reserved Seats	Women		PPP	Khairunisa Mughal	
Reserved Seats	Women		PPP	Maleeha Manzoor	
Reserved Seats	Women		PPP	Nida Khuhro	
Reserved Seats	Women		MQM-P	Nuzhat Pathan	
Reserved Seats	Women		PPP	Rehana Leghari	
Reserved Seats	Women		PPP	Rooma Mushtaq Matto	
Reserved Seats	Women		PPP	Rukhsana Perveen	
Reserved Seats	Women		PPP	Sadia Javed	
Reserved Seats	Women		PPP	Saima Agha	
Reserved Seats	Women		PPP	Sajeela Leghari	
Reserved Seats	Women		PPP	Seema Khurram	
Reserved Seats	Women		PPP	Shaheena Sher Ali	
Reserved Seats	Women		PPP	Shazia Umar	
Reserved Seats	Women			Seat suspended to Reserved seats case	
Reserved Seats	Women		PPP	Syeda Marvi Faseeh	
Reserved Seats	Women		PPP	Tanzeela Qambrani	
Reserved Seats	Women		MQM-P	Bilqees Mukhtar	
Reserved Seats	Women		MQM-P	Farah Sohail	
Reserved Seats	Women		MQM-P	Fouzia Hameed	
Reserved Seats	Women		MQM-P	Kiran Masood	
Reserved Seats	Women			Seat suspended to Reserved seats case	
Reserved Seats	Women		MQM-P	Qurratulain Khan	
Reserved Seats	Women		MQM-P	Sikandar Khatoon	
Reserved Seats	Minorities		MQM-P	Aneel Kumar	
Reserved Seats	Minorities		MQM-P	Mahesh Kumar Hasija	
Reserved Seats	Minorities		PPP	Anthony Naveed	
Reserved Seats	Minorities		PPP	Giyanoo Mal	
Reserved Seats	Minorities		PPP	Khatumal Jeewan	
Reserved Seats	Minorities		PPP	Mukesh Kumar Chawla	
Reserved Seats	Minorities		PPP	Rana Hamir Singh	
Reserved Seats	Minorities			Seat suspended to Reserved seats case	
Reserved Seats	Minorities		PPP	Sham Sunder Advani	
