= NA-234 Karachi Korangi-III =

Constituency of the National Assembly of Pakistan

- Constituency for the National Assembly of Pakistan
- Region: Korangi Town (partly) and Korangi Cantonment (partly) of Korangi District in Karachi
- Electorate: 314,450

Current constituency
- Party: Muttahida Qaumi Movement - Pakistan
- Member: Muhammad Moin Aamir Pirzada
- Created from: NA-254 Karachi-XVI

NA-234 Karachi Korangi-III (این اے-234، کراچی کورنگی-3) is a constituency for the National Assembly of Pakistan. The constituency had previously been a stronghold of MQM-P.

== Assembly Segments ==
Constituency number	Constituency	District	Current MPA	Party
95	PS-95 Karachi Korangi-VI	Korangi District	Muhammad Farooq Awan	PPP
96	PS-96 Karachi Korangi-VII	Korangi District	Muhammad Owais	PTI

== Members of Parliament ==
=== 2018–2023: NA-241 Karachi Korangi-III ===
Election	Member	Party
2018	Faheem Khan	PTI

=== 2024–present: NA-234 Karachi Korangi-III ===
Election	Member	Party
2024	Muhammad Moin Aamir Pirzada	MQM-P

== Election 1997 ==
General election 1997: NA-195 Karachi East Cum Malir-XVI
Party	Candidate	Votes	%	±%
MQM	Sheikh Liaquat Hussain	26,692	32.53	
PML(N)	Sahabzada Muneeruddin Khan	19,949	24.31	
MQM-H	Naseeruddin	11,568	14.10	
PPP	Nabi Dad Khan (N. D. Khan)	10,771	13.13	
PPP(SB)	Jam Sultan Ahmad	9,028	11.00	
Others	Others (seven candidates)	4,046	4.93	
Turnout		83,452	27.03	
Total valid votes		82,054	98.33	
Rejected ballots		1,398	1.67	
Majority		6,743	8.22	
Registered electors		308,731		

== Election 2002 ==
The Pakistan General elections of 2002 were held in Pakistan on 10 October. MQM had a tough election run with competition from the coalition of most religious parties named MMA, however the people of NA-254 showed their support by making Nawab Mirza Advocate of MQM victorious by a significant margin. Mirza got 42888 votes as compared to 16733 of runner-up Syed Zahid Siraj.

General election 2002: NA-254 Karachi East Cum Malir-XVI
Party	Candidate	Votes	%	±%
MQM	Nawab Mirza	42,888	54.18	
MMA	Syed Zahid Siraj	16,733	21.14	
PMA	Abdul Hafiz	5,991	7.57	
PPP	Farzana Latif	4,926	6.22	
PST	Sanwat Ejaz	4,231	5.35	
Others	Others (nine candidates)	4,394	5.54	
Turnout		80,354	34.80	
Total valid votes		79,163	98.52	
Rejected ballots		1,191	1.48	
Majority		26,155	33.04	
Registered electors		230,917		

== Election 2008 ==
General election were supposed to be held on 8 January 2008 but were postponed due to the death of Benazir Bhutto and the PPPP led violence that followed. Elections were eventually held on 18 February 2008.

Dr. Muhammad Ayoub Shaikh of the MQM succeeded in the election 2008 and became the member of National Assembly. He received 132648 votes while the runner-up, Syed Sohail Abrar of the PPPP, could get only 14302 votes.

General election 2008: NA-254 Karachi East Cum Malir-XVI
Party	Candidate	Votes	%	±%
MQM	Muhammad Ayub Sheikh	132,648	86.98	
PPP	Syed Sohail Abrar	14,302	9.38	
PML(N)	Malik Akhtar Hussain Awan	4,965	3.26	
Others	Others (five candidates)	1,587	0.38	
Turnout		155,050	50.18	
Total valid votes		153,502	99.00	
Rejected ballots		1,548	1.00	
Majority		118,346	77.60	
Registered electors		309,017		
MQM hold				

== Election 2013 ==
General election 2013 was held on 11 May however the elections of this constituency were delayed after ANP's candidate, Sadiq Zaman Khattak, was killed on May 2, 2013 by unknown militants. The Taliban later accepted responsibility for the attack stating that it was a part of the attacks on the secular parties: ANP, PPPP & MQM.

The elections were held on 22 August 2013 under heavy security. The voter turnout was low as generally, the enthusiasm to vote is very low in by elections. Some people complained of not being allowed to vote due to errors in the electoral lists. The election commission announced the results on August 23, 2013 declaring MQM's Muhammad Ali Rashid the winner with 84% of the votes.

General election 2013: NA-254 Karachi East Cum Malir-XVI
Party	Candidate	Votes	%	±%
MQM	Ali Rashid	53,045	83.69	
PTI	Muhammad Naeem	5,855	9.24	
PML(N)	Mian Muhammad Ilyas Rasheed	2,533	4.00	
Others	Others (twelve candidates)	1,949	3.07	
Turnout		63,809	16.85	
Total valid votes		63,382	99.33	
Rejected ballots		427	0.67	
Majority		47,190	74.45	
Registered electors		378,712		
MQM hold				

== Election 2018 ==
General elections were held on 25 July 2018.

General election 2018: NA-241 Karachi Korangi-III
Party	Candidate	Votes	%	±%
PTI	Faheem Khan	26,706	23.41	
MQM-P	Muhammad Moin Aamir Pirzada	23,873	20.93	
TLP	Allama Tahir Iqbal Qadri	19,184	16.82	
PML(N)	Taib Zar Khan	16,892	14.81	
PPP	Moazzam Ali Qureshi	9,367	8.21	
PSP	Muhammad Danish Khan	5,167	4.53	
GDA	Abdul Hafiz	4,606	4.04	
Others	Others (eight candidates)	6,017	5.27	
Turnout		114,072	36.28	
Rejected ballots		2,260	1.98	
Majority		2,833	2.48	
Registered electors		314,450		
PTI gain from MQM-P				

== Election 2024 ==
General elections were held on 8 February 2024. Muhammad Moin Aamir Pirzada won the election with 72,009 votes.

General election 2024: NA-234 Karachi Korangi-III
Party	Candidate	Votes	%	±%
MQM-P	Muhammad Moin Aamir Pirzada	72,009	41.60	▲20.67
PTI	Faheem Khan (Note: Filed nomination papers as PTI candidate but ECP allowed him to run as an Independent)	44,487	25.70	▲2.29
PPP	Ali Rashid	18,038	10.42	▲2.21
JI	Akhter Hussain Qureshi	13,521	7.81	N/A
TLP	Abdul Sattar	8,763	5.06	▼11.76
PML(N)	Saleem Zia	6,580	3.80	▼11.01
Others	Others (fourteen candidates)	9,719	5.61	
Turnout		175,071	45.40	▲9.12
Total valid votes		173,117	98.88	
Rejected ballots		1,954	1.12	
Majority		27,522	15.90	
Registered electors		385,628		
MQM-P gain from PTI				

== See also ==
- NA-233 Karachi Korangi-II
- NA-235 Karachi East-I
