= NA-230 Karachi Malir-II =

Constituency of the National Assembly of Pakistan

- Constituency for the National Assembly of Pakistan
- Region: Ibrahim Hyderi Town (partly) and Korangi Cantonment (partly) of Malir District in Karachi
- Electorate: 250,009

Current constituency
- Created: 2018
- Party: Pakistan People's Party
- Member: Syed Rafiullah
- Created from: NA-257 (Karachi-XIX)

NA-230 Karachi Malir-II (این اے-230، کراچی ملیر-2) is a newly-created a constituency for the National Assembly of Pakistan. It mainly comprises the Ibrahim Hyderi Subdivision, and some areas of Korangi Creek Cantonment. It was created in the 2018 delimitation from the bifurcation of the old NA-257.

== Assembly Segments ==
Constituency number	Constituency	District	Current MPA	Party
86	PS-86 Karachi Malir-III	Malir District	Abdul Razak Raja	PPP
87	PS-87 Karachi Malir-IV	Malir District	Mehmood Alam Jamot	PPP

== Members of Parliament ==
=== 2018–2023: NA-238 Karachi Malir-III ===
Election	Member	Party
2018	Syed Rafiullah	PPPP

=== 2024–present: NA-230 Karachi Malir-II ===
Election	Member	Party
2024	Syed Rafiullah	PPPP

== Election 2018 ==
General elections were held on 25 July 2018.

General election 2018: NA-238 Karachi Malir-III
Party	Candidate	Votes	%	±%
PPP	Syed Rafiullah	29,598	28.67	
PRHP	Awrangzib Faruqi	19,463	18.86	
PTI	Zunaira Rehman	16,495	15.98	
PML(N)	Syed Shah Muhammad Shah	14,026	13.59	
MQM-P	Gulfaraz Khan Khattak	6,793	6.58	
MMA	Muhammad Islam	6,673	6.46	
Others	Others (fourteen candidates)	7,360	7.13	
Turnout		103,223	44.00	
Rejected ballots		2,816	2.73	
Majority		10,135	9.81	
Registered electors		234,616		
PPP gain from PRHP				

== Election 2024 ==
General elections were held on 8 February 2024. Syed Rafiullah won the election with 32,099 votes.

General election 2024: NA-230 Karachi Malir-II
Party	Candidate	Votes	%	±%
PPP	Syed Rafiullah	32,099	32.25	▲3.58
PTI	Masroor Ali (Note: Filed nomination papers as PTI candidate but ECP allowed him to run as an Independent)	23,370	23.48	▲7.50
PRHP	Awrangzib Faruqi	15,593	15.66	▼3.20
PML(N)	Haji Muzaffar Ali Shajra	14,805	14.87	▲1.28
Others	Others (twenty-one candidates)	13,679	13.74	
Turnout		102,208	40.88	▼3.12
Total valid votes		99,546	97.40	
Rejected ballots		2,662	2.69	
Majority		8,729	8.77	▼1.04
Registered electors		250,009		
PPP hold				

== See also ==
- NA-229 Karachi Malir-I
- NA-231 Karachi Malir-III
