= Abbas Jafri =

Pakistani model turned politician

Syed Muhammad Abbas Jafri

Member of the Provincial Assembly of Sindh
- Incumbent
- Assumed office 13 August 2018
- Constituency: PS-125 Karachi Central-IV

Personal details
- Born: 30 November 1991 (age 34) Karachi, Sindh, Pakistan
- Occupation: Cricketer, Model, Politician

Syed Muhammad Abbas Jafri (Urdu: عباس جعفری) is a Pakistani politician and model. Jafri is two times Best Male Model Lux Style Awards winner and one time Hum Awards winner.

Jafri contested the 2018 Sindh provincial election for the Sindh Assembly's PS-125 Karachi Central-IV as a candidate of Pakistan Tehreek-e-Insaf (PTI). He won, securing 30,687 votes. In 2020, he was suspended from PTI and was restricted from “speaking or commenting on media (Electronic, Print and Social) against party members and policy decision of the party.” In 2023, Abbas Jafri resigned from his party membership.

== Career ==
Abbas Jafri started his career in cricket and had played in Pakistan Under-19 cricket team for some years. He also played in domestic cricket tournaments. Later in 2001 he got offers for fashion industry so he joined modeling industry and has been seen in different fashion events and shows.

== Awards and nominations ==
- Winner - 10th Lux Style Awards - Model of the Year (Male), 2011
- Winner - 11th Lux Style Awards - Model of the Year (Male), 2012
- Winner - 1st Hum Awards - Best Model (Male), 2013
