= Chandio =

Tribe or clan in Pakistan

The Chandio (چانڊيو) is a Baloch tribe in the Sindh and Balochistan provinces of Pakistan. The Chandio tribe follows a tribal system with their tribal leader, Nawab Ghaibi Sardar Khan Chandio.

== Notable people with this name ==
- Jalal Chandio (1944–2001), Sindhi music folk singer
- Maula Bakhsh Chandio, Member, Senate of Pakistan
- Gulab Chandio - Pakistani television and film actor.
- Umme Rubab Chandio - She is an activist and lawyer
