= PS-123 Karachi Central-II =

Constituency of the Provincial Assembly of Sindh, Pakistan

- Constituency for the Provincial Assembly of Sindh
- Region: New Karachi Town (partly) of Karachi Central District in Karachi
- Electorate: 161,413

Current constituency
- Member: Vacant
- Created from: PS-102 Karachi-XIV (2002-2018); PS-124 Karachi Central-II (2018-2023)

PS-123 Karachi Central-II (پی ایس-123، کراچی وسطی-2) is a constituency of the Provincial Assembly of Sindh.

== General elections 2024 ==
Provincial election 2024: PS-123 Karachi Central-II
Party	Candidate	Votes	%	±%
MQM-P	Abdul Waseem	17,526	27.14	
JI	Muhammad Akber	13,117	20.31	
PTI	Imitaz Ahmed (Note: Filed nomination papers as PTI candidate but ECP allowed him to run as an independent)	9,641	14.93	
TLP	Muhammad Farooq	9,000	13.94	
Independent	Jabina Zameer	3,434	5.32	
PPP	Waseemuddin Qureshi	2,612	4.04	
Independent	Syed Zulfiqar Ali	2,580	4.00	
Independent	Abdul Wahaj Khan	1,801	2.79	
Independent	Jamal Uddin Nasir	1,477	2.29	
PML(N)	Khalid Mumtaz	637	0.99	
Others	Others (twenty one candidates)	2,758	4.25	
Turnout		66,481	33.46	
Total valid votes		64,583	97.15	
Rejected ballots		1,898	2.85	
Majority		4,409	6.83	
Registered electors		198,670		
MQM-P hold				

== General elections 2018 ==
General election 2018: PS-124 Karachi Central-II
Party	Candidate	Votes	%	±%
MQM-P	Khawaja Izharul Hassan	26,162	35.05	
TLP	Muhammad Farooq	17,909	24.00	
PTI	Farhan Saleem	11,198	15.00	
PSP	Syed Mustafa Kamal	7,605	10.19	
MMA	Muhammad Khalid Siddiqui	4,138	5.54	
PPP	Shamim Mumtaz	2,211	2.96	
PML(N)	Mudassir Rahim	2,209	2.96	
PST	Syed Muhammad Umair Sami	947	1.27	
Independent	Muhammad Anees	479	0.64	
PP	Danish	424	0.57	
Independent	Khalid Mumtaz	350	0.47	
Jamiat Ulema-e-Pakistan	Shah Abdul Qadir Siddiqui	320	0.43	
MQM-H	Aamir Akhter	178	0.24	
Independent	Farhan Chishti	169	0.23	
Independent	Muhammad Asif	94	0.13	
Independent	Muhammad Shahid	81	0.11	
ANP	Siraj Ahmed	68	0.09	
Independent	Liaquat Ali Khan Lodhi	35	0.05	
Independent	Muhammad Arshad Choudary	19	0.03	
Independent	Muhammad Ashraf Jabbar	18	0.02	
Independent	Syed Tayyab Hussain hashmi	11	0.01	
Independent	Muhammad Iftikhar Alam	11	0.01	
Total valid votes		74,636		
Rejected ballots		1,030		
Registered electors		206,174		

== See also ==
- PS-122 Karachi Central-I
- PS-124 Karachi Central-III
