= Umme Rubab Chandio =

Pakistani activist and lawyer

Lawyer & Activist Umme Rubab Chandio ام رباب چانڈیو

Personal details
- Born: Umme Rubab Chandio ؟ 31 April 1999 ? Dadu, Sindh, Pakistan
- Education: University of Sindh (LL.B.); University of Sindh (BA)
- Profession: Lawyer, Activist

Umme Rubab Chandio (Sindhi: اُمِ رباب چانڍيو); (Urdu: أم رباب چانڈیو) (born ؟ 31 April 1999) is a Pakistani lawyer and activist, born in Dadu. She became famous after her father Mukhtiar Chandio, grandfather Karamullah Chandio and her paternal uncle Qabil Chandio were gunned down on 17 January 2018.

== Early life ==
Umme Rubab Chandio was born in Dadu into a Sindhi family. In her youth, she received her education in her city. Later she enrolled in the University of Sindh for a Bachelor of Law degree.

She is an activist and lawyer. She went viral on local and international media when she and her father stood against feudalism and feudal tyrants of Sindh. This resulted in the assassinations of her father, grandfather, and uncle.

== Father's case ==
Umme Rubab's father Mukhtiar Chandio, grandfather Karamullah Chandio and paternal uncle Kabil Chandio were gunned down on 17 January 2018 outside of their home. She appealed to then Chief Justice of Pakistan Gulzar Ahmed to take notice of the case and then the case became high profile in Sindh.

It's said that the reason why Umme Rubab hasn't been able to get justice is that the ruling party of Sindh has close ties with the culprits because both culprits MPA Sardar Khan Chandio and his brother MPA Burhan Khan Chandio are a part of the PPP and have remained as aides to the Chief Minister of Sindh Syed Murad Ali Shah.

As of November 2020, two men Ali Gohar Chandio and Sikandar Chandio have been arrested and are in jail while Murtaza Chandio and Zulfiqar are still absconding and allegedly hiding in Balochistan. Umme Rubab finally achieved her first win against Feudals when Dadu’s Criminal Model Trial Court charged Sardar Khan Chandio. The trial court judge Nadeem Babar delivered a reserved verdict.

District court dadu acquitted all eight accused, including two Pakistan Peoples Party MPAs,Nawab Sardar Khan Chandio and his brother Nawabzada Burhan Chandio, in the high-profile murder case of Advocate Ume Rubab Chandio’s grandfather, father and uncle on March 30, 2026

== Career ==
Umme Rubab Chandio started her career in her locality. She played an active role in her city after her father's assassination. She walked barefoot outside of the Supreme Court of Pakistan in order to get justice for her father.

She is also practicing to be a lawyer and she has completed her law degree in 2021. She has also applied to be a member of the Sindh Bar Council.
