= Adeel Ahmed =

Adeel Ahmed may refer to:

- Adeel Ahmed (footballer)
- Adeel Ahmed (politician)
