= Muhammad Younus Soomro =

Pakistani politician

Member of the Provincial Assembly of Sindh
- In office 13 August 2018 – 11 August 2023
- Constituency: PS-107 Karachi South-I

Personal details
- Born: Karachi, Sindh, Pakistan
- Party: TLP (2018-present)

Muhammad Younus Soomro is a Pakistani politician and businessman who had been a member of the Provincial Assembly of Sindh from August 2018 to August 2023. He was elected to the Provincial Assembly of Sindh as a candidate of Tehreek-e-Labbaik Pakistan from Constituency PS-107 (Karachi South-I) in the 2018 Pakistani general election.

== Early life and education ==
He was born in Karachi's Lyari town into a middle-class Sindhi family of the Soomro tribe.

He has earned a B. Com.

== Business career ==
He has been running a small business related to the supply and manufacture of industrial equipment.

== Political career ==
He was elected from the PS-107 Karachi South 2 constituency as a candidate of the Tehreek-e-Labbaik Pakistan (TLP), securing 26,248 votes and defeating his closest rival, Muhammad Asghar Khan of Pakistan Tehreek-e-Insaf (PTI), who received 15,915 votes.
