= PS-122 Karachi Central-I =

Constituency of the Provincial Assembly of Sindh, Pakistan

- Constituency for the Provincial Assembly of Sindh
- Region: New Karachi Town (partly) of Karachi Central District in Karachi
- Electorate: 136,940

Current constituency
- Member: Vacant
- Created from: PS-98 Karachi-X (2002-2018); PS-123 Karachi Central-I (2018-2023)

PS-122 Karachi Central-I (پی ایس-122، کراچی وسطی-1) is a constituency of the Provincial Assembly of Sindh.

== General elections 2024 ==
Provincial election 2024: PS-122 Karachi Central-I
Party	Candidate	Votes	%	±%
MQM-P	Rehan Akram Mirza	48,170	42.27	
PTI	Farhan Saleem (Note: Filed nomination papers as PTI candidate but ECP allowed him to run as an Independent)	23,018	20.20	
JI	Qazi Syed Sadaruddin	19,437	17.06	
Independent	Syed Muhammad Asif Raza	6,013	5.28	
PPP	Syed Masroor Ahsan	5,714	5.01	
TLP	Muhammad Yaqoob	3,854	3.38	
IPP	Muhammad Ashraf Jabbar	3,736	3.28	
Others	Others (twenty candidates)	4,013	3.52	
Turnout		115,076	55.57	
Total valid votes		113,955	99.03	
Rejected ballots		1,121	0.97	
Majority		25,152	22.07	
Registered electors		207,082		
MQM-P hold				

== General elections 2018 ==
General election 2018: PS-123 Karachi Central-I
Party	Candidate	Votes	%	±%
MQM-P	Waseemuddin Qureshi	28,161	36.49	
PTI	Faizan Muslim	20,577	26.67	
PSP	Naila Muneer	8,062	10.45	
TLP	Syed Aslam Ahmed Qadri	6,739	8.73	
MMA	Muhammad Yousuf	6,519	8.45	
PML(N)	Umair Fayyaz	3,504	4.54	
PPP	Rehana Anjum	1,145	1.48	
APML	Syed Muhammad Asif	684	0.89	
Independent	Liaquat Ali	603	0.78	
Independent	Malik Abdul Nasir Khilji	243	0.31	
Independent	Fareed Ud Din Chishti	238	0.31	
PST	Malik Matloob Ali Awan	208	0.27	
GDA	Muhammad Ali Tariq	164	0.21	
PKI-Ch.Anwar	Zain Ul Abidin	102	0.13	
Independent	Waqar Hassan	79	0.10	
Independent	Muhammad Yaseen	55	0.07	
MQM-H	Syed Kamran Ali Rizvi	35	0.05	
Independent	Muhammad Azeem Khan	31	0.04	
Independent	Muhammad Mohiuddin	13	0.02	
Peoples Movement Pakistan	Malik Waleed Jahangir	6	0.01	
Total valid votes		77,168		
Rejected ballots		920		
Registered electors		197,879		

== General elections 2013 ==
Contesting candidates	Party affiliation	Votes polled

== General elections 2008 ==
Contesting candidates	Party affiliation	Votes polled

== See also ==
- PS-121 Karachi West-VI
- PS-123 Karachi Central-II
