= Khawaja Izharul Hassan =

Pakistani politician

- خواجہ اظہار الحسن
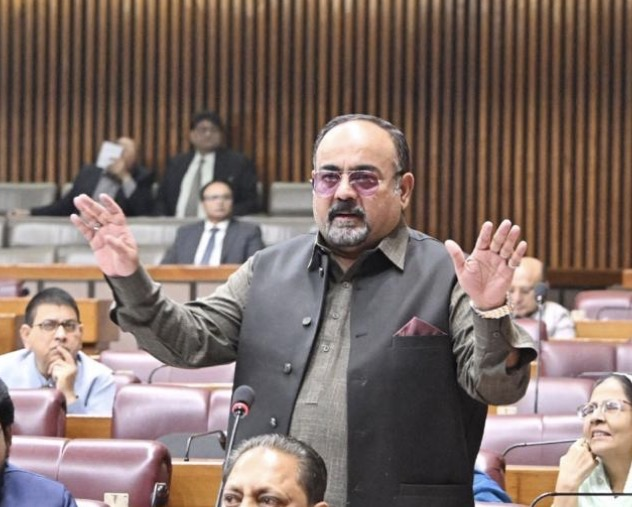

Leader of the Opposition of Provincial Assembly of Sindh
- In office 29 April 2015 – 28 May 2018
- Preceded by: Muhammad Shaharyar Khan Mahar
- Succeeded by: Firdous Naqvi
- Constituency: PS-99 (Karachi-XI)

Member of Provincial Assembly of Sindh
- In office 13 August 2018 – 11 August 2023
- Constituency: PS-124 (Karachi Central-II)
- In office 2013–2018
- Succeeded by: Himself
- Constituency: PS-99 (Karachi-XI)
- In office 2008–2013

Personal details
- Born: Karachi, Sindh, Pakistan
- Party: MQM-P (2016-present)
- Other political affiliations: MQM-L (2008-2016)
- Education: MBA, PIMSAT; LL.B., University of Karachi; BSc, University of Karachi
- Profession: Politician, businessperson
- Committees: Standing Committee on Cooperatives (Chairperson); Standing Committee on Information and Archives; Standing Committee on Katchi Abadies; Standing Committee on Planning, Development and Special Initiatives

Khawaja Izharul Hassan (Urdu: خواجہ اظہار الحسن; born 26 October 1971) is a Pakistani politician from the Muttahida Qaumi Movement Pakistan (MQM) and was the leader of the opposition in the 12th Sindh Assembly. He has been a member of the National Assembly of Pakistan since February 2024. He was also a member of the Provincial Assembly of Sindh from August 2018 to August 2023.

He is married and has three children namely Hashir, Mehak and Aaraiz. He won the PS-99 (Karachi-XI) seat in the 2008 and 2013 Pakistani general elections. Hassan served as the chairperson of the Standing Committee on Cooperatives in the 12th Sindh Assembly. He is also a member of the standing committees on Kachi Abadies; Information and Archives; and Planning, Development and Special Initiatives.

== Assassination attempt ==
Early morning on 2 September 2017, he escaped unhurt in an assassination attempt following the Eid ul Adha prayer in Buffer Zone, Karachi by terrorist group Ansarul Sharia Pakistan. A police constable from Hassan's police guards and a 13-year-old boy were killed in the attack and at least four others were injured. One of the attackers was shot dead in retaliatory firing, while the second was injured but managed to flee. The police recovered as many as 27 bullet casings of 9mm pistol from the scene.
