= Muhammad Farooq Farhan =

Pakistani politician

Muhammad Farooq Farhan is a Pakistani politician who has been a Member of the Provincial Assembly of Sindh since 2024.

== Political career ==
He was elected to the 16th Provincial Assembly of Sindh as a candidate of the Jamaat-e-Islami (Pakistan) from Constituency PS-91 Karachi Korangi-II in the 2024 Pakistani general election.
