= Faheem Khan (politician) =

Pakistani politician

Member of the National Assembly of Pakistan
- In office 13 August 2018 – 17 January 2023
- Constituency: NA-241 (Korangi Karachi-III)

Personal details
- Born: Karachi, Sindh, Pakistan
- Party: PTI (2018–present)

Faheem Khan Swati is a Pakistani politician who was a member of the National Assembly of Pakistan from August 2018 to January 2023. He is from Mandravi clan of the Swati tribe of Battal Mansehra.

== Political career ==
Khan was elected to the National Assembly of Pakistan from Constituency NA-241 (Korangi Karachi-III) as a candidate of Pakistan Tehreek-e-Insaf in the 2018 Pakistani general election.
