= Syed Ejaz Ul Haque =

Pakistani politician

Syed Ejaz Ul Haque is a Pakistani politician who has been a Member of the Provincial Assembly of Sindh since 2024.

== Political career ==
He was elected to the 16th Provincial Assembly of Sindh as a candidate of the Muttahida Qaumi Movement – Pakistan from Constituency PS-121 Karachi West-VI in the 2024 Pakistani general election.
