= Syed Rafiullah =

Pakistani politician

Member of the National Assembly of Pakistan
- Incumbent
- Assumed office 29 February 2024
- Constituency: NA-230 Karachi Malir-II
- In office 13 August 2018 – 10 August 2023
- Constituency: NA-230 Karachi Malir-II

Personal details
- Born: Karachi, Sindh, Pakistan
- Party: PPP (2018-present)

Syed Agha Rafiullah is a Pakistani politician who was a member of the National Assembly of Pakistan in 2024. Rafiullah previously served in the post from August 2018 until August 2023.

== Political career ==
He was elected to the National Assembly of Pakistan from Constituency NA-238 (Malir-III) as a candidate of Pakistan Peoples Party in the 2018 Pakistani general election.

He was re-elected to the National Assembly of Pakistan from Constituency NA-230 (Malir-II) as a candidate of Pakistan Peoples Party in the 2024 Pakistani general election.
