= Muhammad Ayub Sheikh =

Pakistani politician

Member of the National Assembly of Pakistan
- In office 2008–2013
- Constituency: NA-254 (Karachi-XVI)

Personal details
- Born: Karachi, Sindh, Pakistan

Muhammad Ayub Sheikh is a Pakistani politician who was a member of the National Assembly of Pakistan from 2008 to 2013.

== Political career ==
He was elected to the National Assembly of Pakistan from Constituency NA-254 (Karachi-XVI) as a candidate of Muttahida Qaumi Movement (MQM) in the 2008 Pakistani general election. He received 132,648 votes and defeated Syed Suhail Abrar, a candidate of Pakistan Peoples Party (PPP).
