= Syed Adil Askari =

Pakistani politician and businessman

Member of the Provincial Assembly of Sindh
- Incumbent
- Assumed office 24 February 2024
- Constituency: PS-125 Karachi Central-IV

Personal details
- Born: 9 February 1981 (age 45) Karachi, Sindh, Pakistan
- Party: MQM-P (2024-present)

Syed Adil Askari is a Pakistani politician who has been a Member of the Provincial Assembly of Sindh since 2024 his political party is mqm adil Askari is known for criticising traffic-e-challan system he is also known for advocating for a better Karachi

== Early life and education ==
He was born on 9 February 1982. in Karachi, Pakistan.

He holds a B.S. in Engineering from Sir Syed University of Engineering and Technology, an MBA from the Institute of Business Management, Karachi, and an MPA from the University of Karachi.

== Political career ==
He was elected to the 16th Provincial Assembly of Sindh as a candidate of the Muttahida Qaumi Movement – Pakistan from constituency PS-125 Karachi Central-IV in the 2024 Pakistani general election.
