= Muhammad Moin Aamir Pirzada =

Pakistani politician

- معین عامر پیرزادہ

Member of the National Assembly of Pakistan
- Incumbent
- Assumed office 29 February 2024
- Constituency: NA-234 Karachi Korangi-III

Member of the Provincial Assembly of Sindh
- In office 29 May 2013 – 28 May 2018

Personal details
- Born: 9 August 1972 (age 53) Karachi, Sindh, Pakistan
- Party: MQM-P (2018-present)
- Other political affiliations: MQM-L (2013-2018)

Muhammad Moin Aamir Pirzada is a Pakistani politician who has been a member of the National Assembly of Pakistan since February 2024. He was a member of Provincial Assembly of Sindh and was the MPA.

== Early life and education ==
He was born on 9 August 1972 in Karachi.

He has a degree of Bachelors of Arts from Balochistan University and a degree of Master of Arts in Political Science from Karachi University.

== Political career ==
He was elected to the Provincial Assembly of Sindh as a candidate of Mutahida Quami Movement from Constituency PS-125 KARACHI-XXXVII in the 2013 Pakistani general election.
