= Dua Bhutto =

Pakistani politician

Member of the Provincial Assembly of Sindh
- In office 13 August 2018 – 11 August 2023
- Constituency: Reserved seat for women

Personal details
- Born: Karachi, Sindh, Pakistan
- Party: PTI (2018-present)
- Spouse: Haleem Adil Sheikh (m. 2018)

Dua Bhutto is a Pakistani politician who had been a member of the Provincial Assembly of Sindh from August 2018 to August 2023.

== Political career ==
She was elected to the Provincial Assembly of Sindh as a candidate of Pakistan Tehreek-e-Insaf (PTI) on a reserved seat for women in the 2018 Pakistani general election.

== Personal life ==
In October 2022, Dua Bhutto approached the Malir family court to file ‘khula [separation]’ from Haleem Adil Sheikh. She stated in his plea that she does not want to live with Sheikh anymore for many reasons. Later it was reported that Bhutto withdrew her plea to seek divorce. The couple have a son together.
