= Abdul Basit (Pakistani politician) =

Pakistani politician

Abdul Basit MPA

Member of the Provincial Assembly of Sindh
- Incumbent
- Assumed office 24 February 2024
- Constituency: PS-124 Karachi Central-III
- Majority: 12,597

Personal details
- Party: Muttahida Qaumi Movement – Pakistan

Abdul Basit is a Pakistani politician who serves as a member of the Provincial Assembly of Sindh, a position he has held since February 2024. He represents the constituency PS-124 Karachi Central-III as a legislative member of the Muttahida Qaumi Movement – Pakistan (MQM-P).

== Political career ==
Basit entered the legislative arena during the 2024 Pakistani general election, contesting for a seat in the 16th Provincial Assembly of Sindh. He ran as the official nominee of the Muttahida Qaumi Movement – Pakistan from the constituency PS-124 Karachi Central-III, which was formed following the 2023 electoral delimitations based on the national census.

During the polling held on 8 February 2024, Basit successfully secured the seat by accumulating 31,035 votes, which accounted for approximately 35.45% of the total cast ballots. He defeated his runner-up opponent, Muhammad Ahmed of Jamaat-e-Islami Pakistan, who obtained 18,438 votes, registering a winning majority margin of 12,597 votes. He was formally sworn into office alongside fellow assembly members on 24 February 2024 during the inaugural session of the provincial legislature.

=== Election results ===
Provincial election 2024: PS-124 Karachi Central-III
Party	Candidate	Votes	%	±%
MQM-P	Abdul Basit	31,035	35.45	
JI	Muhammad Ahmed	18,438	21.06	
Independent	Muhammad Wajahat Ali	15,770	18.01	
TLP	Muhammad Amjad Ali	9,626	11.00	
PRHP	Abdul Ghaffar	2,650	3.03	
Independent	Munawer Nawab	2,501	2.86	
Turnout		88,751	42.81	
Majority		12,597	14.39	
MQM-P gain from		Swing		
