= Firdous Shamim Naqvi =

Pakistani politician

Leader of the Opposition in the Provincial Assembly of Sindh
- In office 24 September 2018 – 8 January 2021
- Preceded by: Khawaja Izharul Hassan
- Succeeded by: Haleem Adil Sheikh

Member of the Provincial Assembly of Sindh
- In office 13 August 2018 – 11 August 2023
- Constituency: PS-101 (Karachi East-III)

Personal details
- Born: Karachi, Sindh, Pakistan
- Party: PTI (1996-present)

Syed Firdous Shamim Naqvi is a Pakistani politician who served as the Leader of the Opposition in the Provincial Assembly of Sindh from 24 September 2018 to 8 January 2021. He had been a member of the Provincial Assembly of Sindh from August 2018 to August 2023. He has served as a member of the Core Committee of PTI since 1996. He has also served from 2015 to 2019 in the Karachi Municipal Corporation as Union Council Chairman for UC-18 Karachi East.

== Early life and education ==
Naqvi was born on 10 May 1956 in Faisalabad, Pakistan.

He received a degree of Bachelor of Engineering in Civil from the NED University of Engineering and Technology and degree of Masters in Construction Management and Masters in Highways & Design Material from the University of Michigan in only 8 months (2 semesters) bringing accolade for NED & Pakistan.

== Political career ==
He joined PTI as a founding member in 1996 and worked closely with Imran Khan in building the party. Naqvi became a member Central executive of Pakistan Tehreek-e-Insaf when it was founded by Imran Khan in 1996. He was appointed its spokesperson in 2007. Naqvi also chaired party's Manifesto Committee for 2013 elections. Naqvi serves as the member of the Central Executive Committee and spokesperson on Commerce & Industry of Pakistan Tehreek-e-Insaf. One of Tehreek-e-Insaf's most prominent members from Karachi. Naqvi still remains Member in Core Committee of Tehreek-e-Insaf since 1996. He was President of PTI Karachi chapter during elections 2018. Under his leadership PTI won 14 out 21 National Assembly seats and 21 out of 44 Provincial Assembly seats. He was elected to the Provincial Assembly of Sindh as a candidate of Pakistan Tehreek-e-Insaf (PTI) from Constituency PS-101 (Karachi East-III) in the 2018 Pakistani general election.

In September 2018, he resigned as president of PTI chapter in Karachi.

On 5 September 2018, PTI nominated him as leader of the opposition in the Provincial Assembly of Sindh. On 24 September, he was declared as Leader of Opposition.

On 8 January 2021, he resigned as leader of Opposition of Sindh Assembly.
