= Bilal Ahmed Ghaffar =

Pakistani politician

Member of the Provincial Assembly of Sindh
- In office 13 August 2018 – 11 August 2023
- Constituency: PS-103 (Karachi East-V)

Personal details
- Born: Karachi, Sindh, Pakistan
- Other political affiliations: PTI (2018-2023)

Bilal Ahmed Ghaffar is a Pakistani politician who has been a member of the Provincial Assembly of Sindh since August 2018.

== Political career ==
He was elected to the Provincial Assembly of Sindh as a candidate of Pakistan Tehreek-e-Insaf from Constituency PS-103 (Karachi East-V) in the 2018 Pakistani general election.
In February 2023, Chairman PTI Imran Khan decided to remove him as President of PTI Karachi Chapter & appointed in central party position. He left PTI (Pakistan Tehreek-e-Insaaf) on 23 May 2023 and in his interview, he said "After working as a political activist for the last 12 years, i’ve decided to quit politics for good."
