= PS-106 Karachi South-I =

Constituency of the Provincial Assembly of Sindh, Pakistan

- Constituency for the Provincial Assembly of Sindh
- Region: Lyari Town (partly) of Karachi South District in Karachi
- Electorate: 227,787

Current constituency
- Member: Vacant
- Created from: PS-109 Karachi-XXI (2002–2018); PS-107 Karachi South-I (2018–2023)

PS-106 Karachi South-I (پی ایس-106، کراچی جنوبی-1) is a constituency of the Provincial Assembly of Sindh.

== General elections 2024 ==
Provincial election 2024: PS-106 Karachi South-I
Party	Candidate	Votes	%	±%
Independent	Sajjad Ali Soomro (Note: Filed nomination papers as PTI candidate but ECP allowed him to run as an Independent)	20,670	28.18	
PPP	Usman Ghani	16,842	22.96	
JI	Syed Abdul Rasheed	15,888	21.66	
TLP	Muhammad Shakeel	12,534	17.09	
JUI (F)	Nasir Mahmood	5,081	6.93	
Others	Others (fourteen candidates)	2,335	3.18	
Turnout		74,586	32.74	
Total valid votes		73,350	98.34	
Rejected ballots		1,236	1.66	
Majority		3,828	5.22	
Registered electors		227,787		
PTI gain from PPP				

== General elections 2018 ==
Provincial election 2018: PS-107 Karachi South-I
Party	Candidate	Votes	%	±%
TLP	Muhammad Younas Soomro S/O Ismail	26,498	30.32	
PTI	Muhammad Asghar Khan	16,609	19.01	
PPP	Muhammad Jawaid	15,000	17.17	
MMA	Fazal Ur Rehman Niazi	12,850	14.71	
PML(N)	Shahid Rana	5,177	5.92	
MQM-P	Muhammad Rafique S/O Ahmed	2,739	3.13	
Independent	Shah Jahan Baloch	2,426	2.78	
Independent	Muhammad Hanif	1,298	1.49	
PPP(SB)	Faiz Ur Rehman	831	0.95	
PRHP	Muhammad Sami	689	0.79	
Independent	Muhammad Rafique S/O Muhammad Suleman	684	0.78	
Pasban-e-Pakistan	Fazal E Rabi	551	0.63	
PSP	Ali Muhammad	489	0.56	
Independent	Afshan	399	0.46	
GDA	Akbar	363	0.42	
ANP	Akhtar Muhammad	349	0.40	
Independent	Babar Riaz Brohi	191	0.22	
PJDP	Muhammad Imran Qureshi	96	0.11	
Independent	Noor Muhammad	68	0.08	
Independent	Muhammad Younus Soomro S/O Adam Soomro	44	0.05	
PSP	Abdul Latif	13	0.01	
Independent	Abdul Razzaq	11	0.01	
Independent	Muhammad Hashim Attari	9	0.01	
Majority		9,889	11.31	
Valid ballots		87,384		
Rejected ballots		1,773		
Turnout		89,157		
Registered electors		221,361		
hold				

== General elections 2013 ==
Contesting candidates	Party affiliation	Votes polled

== General elections 2008 ==
Contesting candidates	Party affiliation	Votes polled

== See also ==
- PS-105 Karachi East-IX
- PS-107 Karachi South-II
