= Ali Rashid =

Pakistani politician

Muhammad Ali Rashid

Member of the National Assembly of Pakistan
- In office 16 September 2013 – 31 May 2018
- Constituency: NA-234 Karachi Korangi-III

Personal details
- Party: TLP (2025–present)
- Other political affiliations: PPP (2024–2025); MQM-L (2013–2016)

Muhammad Ali Rashid (Urdu: محمد علی راشد) is a Pakistani politician who served as a member of the National Assembly of Pakistan from September 2013 to May 2018.

== Political career ==
He was elected to the National Assembly of Pakistan as a candidate of Muttahida Qaumi Movement (MQM) from Constituency NA-254 (Karachi-XVI) in by-elections held in August 2013. He received 53,045 votes and defeated Muhammad Naem, a candidate of Pakistan Tehreek-e-Insaf (PTI).
