= PS-121 Karachi West-VI =

Constituency of the Provincial Assembly of Sindh, Pakistan

- Constituency for the Provincial Assembly of Sindh
- Region: Mominabad Town (partly) of Karachi West District in Karachi
- Electorate: 215,610

Current constituency
- Member: Vacant
- Created from: PS-97 Karachi-IX (2002-2018); 117 Karachi West-VI (2018-2023)

PS-121 Karachi West-VI (پی ایس-121، کراچی غربی-6) is a constituency of the Provincial Assembly of Sindh.

== General elections 2024 ==
Provincial election 2024: PS-121 Karachi West-VI
Party	Candidate	Votes	%	±%
MQM-P	Syed Ejaz Ul Haque	26,454	29.72	
PTI	Shakeel Ahmed (Note: Filed nomination papers as PTI candidate but ECP allowed him to run as an Independent)	21,460	24.11	
JI	Muhammad Mudassir Hussain Ansari	17,592	19.76	
TLP	Abid Hussain	11,377	12.78	
PPP	Muhammad Aleem	3,329	3.74	
Independent	Naila Yousuf	2,954	3.32	
Independent	Syed Muhammad Hasnain	938	1.05	
Independent	Mohi Uddin	837	0.94	
PML(N)	Niaz Ahmed Malik	739	0.83	
Others	Others (seventeen candidates)	3,344	3.75	
Turnout		90,643	42.04	
Total valid votes		89,024	98.41	
Rejected ballots		1,619	1.59	
Majority		4,994	5.61	
Registered electors		215,610		
MQM-P hold				

== General elections 2018 ==
General election 2018: PS-117 Karachi (West-VI)
Party	Candidate	Votes	%	±%
MQM-P	Sadaqat Hussain	25,441	29.66	
TLP	Mohammad Munawar Ali Shaikh	17,074	19.90	
PTI	Shakeel Ahmed	16,371	19.08	
MMA	Mohammad Mudassir Ansari	13,961	16.27	
PPP	Waseem Akhter	3,658	4.26	
PSP	Mohammad Adil Khan	3,472	4.05	
PML(N)	Fahad Shafiq	1,984	2.31	
APML	Ghulam Qadir	1,854	2.16	
Independent	Syed Shahid Iqbal	410	0.48	
AAT	Nadir Khan	388	0.45	
Independent	Muhammad Naeem	227	0.26	
PP	Zafar Iqbal	201	0.23	
Independent	Muhammad Razzaq	165	0.19	
Independent	Tariq Iqbal	147	0.17	
Independent	Muhammad Sabir Hussain	108	0.13	
Independent	Syed Javed Hussain	56	0.07	
Independent	Muhammad Kamran Ansari	48	0.06	
Independent	Anam Fishan	46	0.05	
Independent	Anwar Malik	45	0.05	
Independent	Asif Iqbal	44	0.05	
Independent	Muhammad Saleem	36	0.04	
Independent	Mehmood Saeed	26	0.03	
PMP	Syed Muhammad Abdul Bashar	25	0.03	
Total valid votes		85,787	49.39	
Rejected ballots		1,834		
Registered electors		177,415		

== See also ==
- PS-120 Karachi West-V
- PS-122 Karachi Central-I
