= Altaf Shakoor =

Pakistani politician

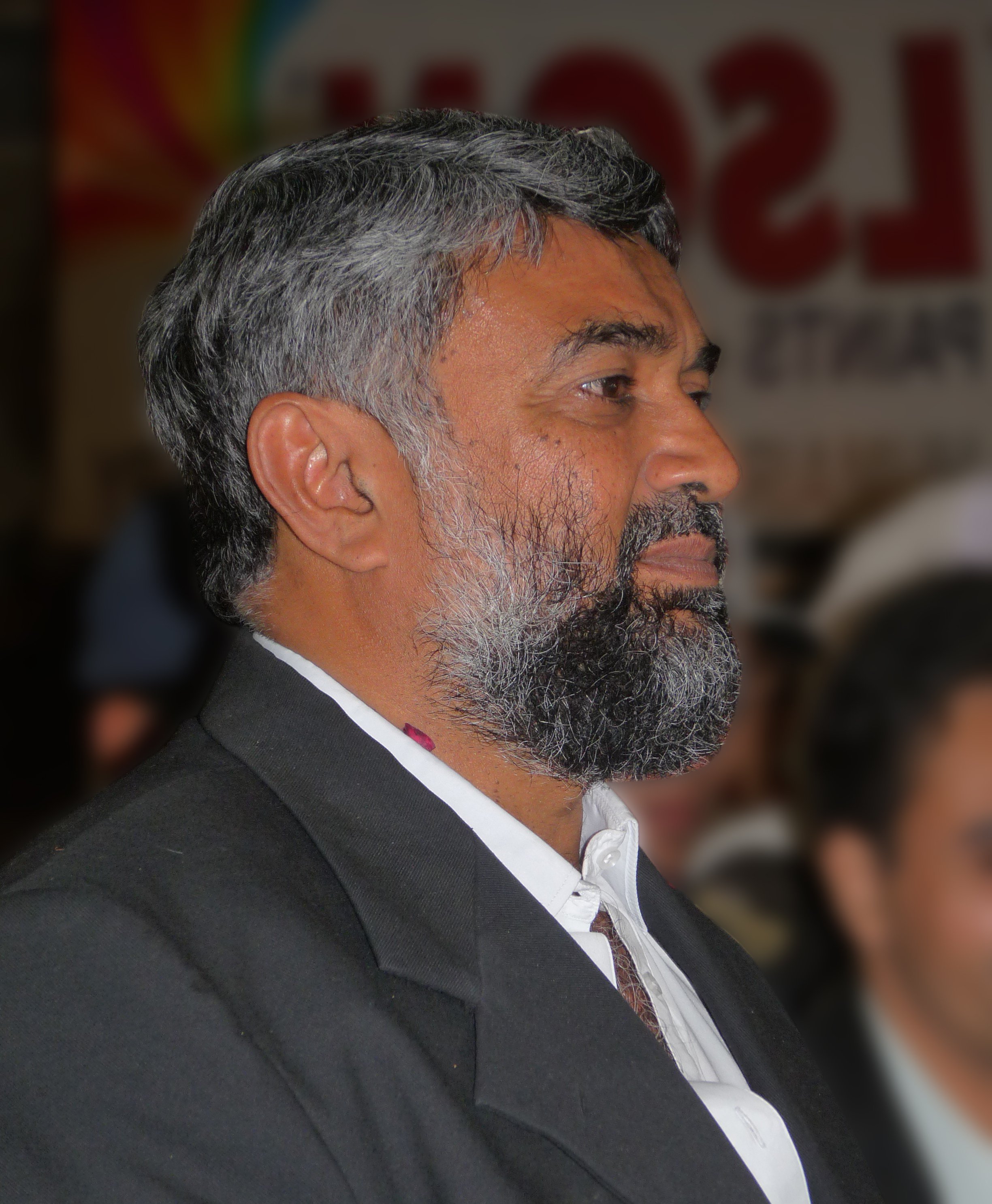
- Altaf Shakoor in 2015

President of Pasban-e-Pakistan
- Incumbent
- Assumed office 1995
- Preceded by: Position established

Personal details
- Party: Pasban-e-Pakistan (1995-present)
- Education: Engineer
- Occupation: Politician
- Profession: Trader

Altaf Shakoor (Urdu: الطاف شکور; born 15 August 1959) is a Pakistani politician who is the founder and current president of Pasban, a Pakistani social-political organization.

== Early life ==
Altaf Shakoor was born on 15 August 1959, in Karachi, Sindh. He is an engineer by education and trader by profession.

== Political career ==
In 1994, he founded the Pasban Party and he was elected as president of Pasban Pakistan in the same year. He then established various branches of Pasban in Sindh province, the most literate part in the south of Pakistan. It highlights the problems faced by common man of the society in media.
