= PS-103 Karachi East-VII =

Constituency of the Provincial Assembly of Sindh, Pakistan

- Constituency for the Provincial Assembly of Sindh
- Region: Jamshed Town (partly) and Gulshan-e-Iqbal town (partly) of Karachi East District in Karachi
- Electorate: 196,454

Current constituency
- Created: 2023
- Party: MQM-P
- Member: Faisal Rafiq
- Created from: PS-106 Karachi East-VIII (2018-2023)

PS-103 Karachi East-VII (پی ایس-103، کراچی مشرقی-7) is a constituency of the Provincial Assembly of Sindh. This was created after 2023 Delimitations when Karachi East gained 1 seat.

== General elections 2024 ==
Provincial election 2024: PS-103 Karachi East-VII
Party	Candidate	Votes	%	±%
MQM-P	Faisal Rafiq	15,870	28.36	
JI	Muhammad Ynuns	12,345	22.06	
PTI	Ali Ahmed Palh (Note: Filed nomination papers PTI candidate but ECP allowed him to run as an independent)	9,779	17.47	
TLP	Muhammad Bilal Raza	5,685	10.16	
PPP	Thakur Zulfiqar Ali Kaim Khani	3,441	6.15	
Independent	Noor Ahmed Khan	2,010	3.59	
Independent	Asghar Hussain Manekia	1,754	3.13	
Independent	Syed Muhammad Danish	957	1.71	
Independent	Muhammad Noman Khan	931	1.66	
MQM-H	Muhammad Adnan	745	1.33	
PML(N)	Muazzama Arjumand	642	1.15	
Others	Others (twenty one candidates)	1,805	3.23	
Turnout		56,957	28.99	
Total valid votes		55,964	98.26	
Rejected ballots		993	1.74	
Majority		3,525	6.30	
Registered electors		196,454		
MQM-P win (new seat)				

== See also ==
- PS-102 Karachi East-VI
- PS-104 Karachi East-VIII
