= Sajjad Ali Soomro =

Pakistani politician

Sajjad Ali Soomro is a Pakistani politician who has been a Member of the Provincial Assembly of Sindh since 2024.

== Political career ==
He was elected to the 16th Provincial Assembly of Sindh as a Pakistan Tehreek-e-Insaf-backed independent candidate for constituency PS-106 Karachi South-I in the 2024 Pakistani general election.
