= Ansarul Sharia Pakistan =

Islamist militant group based in Karachi, Pakistan

- Founder: Sheheryar aka Abdullah Hashmi (POW)
- Dates active: February 2017 - May 2019
- Allegiance: Al-Qaeda
- Active regions: Karachi
- Ideology: Islamism; Islamic extremism Qutbism; Anti-Secularism; Anti-Liberalism

Ansarul Sharia Pakistan (Urdu: انصار الشیعیعہ جماعات; ASP) was an Islamist militant group based in Karachi, Pakistan. The organization was founded in February 2017. The group was known for committing many attacks, at one point it was performing attacks on a weekly basis. The group claimed that it had recruited members from South Punjab, Balochistan, and Waziristan. The group had also claimed to have ties to Al-Qaeda.

== History ==
The group was founded in February 2017 and originates from the Punjab, Pakistan. The leaders of the group are claimed to have derived their ideology and tactical methodologies from Osama Bin Laden and his organization, Al-Qaeda. Members of the group allegedly fought for the Islamic State Khurasan Province, but the organization's brutal tactics drove its members into creating Ansarul Sharia Pakistan.

The group originally consisted of roughly ten to twelve young men who attended various universities in Karachi, Pakistan. The group was known to communicate using smartphone apps and were known to be wearing medallions that held small memory cards that carried important information about the group. Law enforcement claimed that the group receives a list of targeted killing tasks from abroad.

Eight members of the group were killed during a counter-terrorism operation in Karachi. The encounter claimed the life of the group's leader Sheheryar who went by the alias Dr. Abdullah Hashmi. Another identified from the dead was Arsalan Baig who was known for his activity in the group's targeted killings. After this attack, five people in the group died immediately and three others died while en route to the hospital.

== Leadership ==
The leader of Ansarul Shariah (Pakistan) was Sheheryar. He received his master's degree in applied physics from the University of Karachi. He worked as an information technology expert for the computer department at NED University of Engineering and Technology.

Sheheryar was arrested in September 2017.

Abdul Karim Sarosh Siddiqui and Muzammil Ali Junaidi are claimed to have been the masterminds behind the attacks on Khawaja Izharul Hassan, the leader of the opposition in the Sindh Assembly. Siddiqui was also a student of applied physics at the University of Karachi while Muzammil was a final year student at NED University. Siddiqui was suspected of being close friends with the suspected militant Hassan who died during the attempted assassination of Izharul Hassan.

== Claimed attacks ==
1. In Karachi, the group claimed responsibility for the killing of retired colonel Tahir Zia Nagi around the Baloch Colony area.
2. The organization attempted an assassination on Khawaja Izharul Hassan. Hassan was the leader of the opposition in the Sindh Assembly and lead the creation of new record keeping laws in order to track terrorist activity in Karachi. During this attack the police were able to chase down and identify one of the attackers. This eventually led to the downfall of the Ansarul Sharia.
3. The group claimed responsibility for the killing of a security guard in Gulistan-e-Johar.
4. The militant organization used motorcycles to shoot dead four police officers in Karachi. The attackers left the scene without confrontation. The group left behind pamphlets that stated that it was targeting security forces in the area and claimed responsibility for the attacks. This also led police to determine that the organization was behind the shooting.

== Culpability for attacks ==
1. The group was tied to the attack of two New Town policemen.
2. They are suspected of being responsible for the killing of DSP Traffic and his constable driver in Azizabad.
3. The organization has been tied to the murder of two employees of the Federal Board of Revenue in Gulistan-e-Johar. The employees were sought out because the group suspected them of being policemen.
4. The group was accused of being responsible for the murder of Qaumi Razakar a police officer who was on the Northern Bypass.
