= Raja Azhar Khan =

Pakistani politician

Member of the Provincial Assembly of Sindh
- In office 13 August 2018 – 11 August 2023
- Constituency: PS-97 Korangi Karachi-VI

Personal details
- Born: Karachi, Sindh, Pakistan
- Party: PTI (2013-present)

Raja Azhar Khan is a Pakistani politician who had been a member of the Provincial Assembly of Sindh from August 2018 to August 2023.

== Political career ==
He was elected to the Provincial Assembly of Sindh as a candidate of Pakistan Tehreek-e-Insaf from PS-97 Korangi Karachi-VI in the 2018 Sindh provincial election.
