= PS-102 Karachi East-VI =

Constituency of the Provincial Assembly of Sindh, Pakistan

- Constituency for the Provincial Assembly of Sindh
- Region: Jamshed Town (partly) of Karachi East District in Karachi
- Electorate: 247,329

Current constituency
- Member: Vacant
- Created from: PS-116 Karachi-XXVIII (2002–2018); PS-106 Karachi East-VIII (2018–2023)

PS-102 Karachi East-VI (پی ایس-102، کراچی مشرقی-6) is a constituency of the Provincial Assembly of Sindh.

== General elections 2024 ==
Provincial election 2024: PS-102 Karachi East-VI
Party	Candidate	Votes	%	±%
MQM-P	Muhammad Aamir Siddiqui	25,330	28.77	
JI	Muhammad Najeeb Ayubi	19,514	22.16	
PTI	Jamal Uddin Siddiqui (Note: Filed nomination papers as PTI candidate run as an independent)	18,728	21.27	
PPP	Aqraba Fatima	11,526	13.09	
TLP	Muhammad Hussain	5,945	6.75	
Independent	Muhammed Khalid	3,081	3.50	
PML(N)	Syed Nisar Shah	1,345	1.53	
Others	Others (twenty one candidates)	2,578	2.93	
Turnout		88,835	35.92	
Total valid votes		88,047	99.11	
Rejected ballots		788	0.89	
Majority		5,816	6.61	
Registered electors		247,325		
MQM-P gain from PTI				

== General elections 2018 ==
Provincial election 2018: PS-106 Karachi East-VIII
Party	Candidate	Votes	%	±%
PTI	Jamal Uddin Siddqui	25,840	33.76	
MQM-P	Muhammad Zahid	13,163	17.20	
TLP	Ghulam Hashim	9,660	12.62	
MMA	Muhammad Aslam Ghori	8,909	11.64	
PPP	Shehzad Natha	6,212	8.12	
PML(N)	Muhammad Tahir Shehzada	5,227	6.83	
PSP	Syed Qamar Akhtar Naqvi	3,237	4.23	
Independent	Liaquat Munwar	1,372	1.79	
Independent	Salim Sachwani	642	0.84	
Independent	Jamal Uddin Saeed	555	0.73	
ANP	Sami Ullah	398	0.52	
Independent	Uzma Saeed	342	0.45	
Independent	Dilawar Jackson	303	0.40	
Independent	Muhammad Hussain	255	0.33	
Independent	Jamsheed Ali	239	0.31	
MQM-H	Laiq Ahmed	86	0.11	
Independent	Hafiz Muhammad Shehryar Khan	74	0.10	
Independent	Adil Niaz Khan	18	0.02	
Independent	Muhammad Nasir Akbani	18	0.02	
Majority		12,677	16.56	
Valid ballots		76,550		
Rejected ballots		1,361		
Turnout		77,911		
Registered electors		205,385		
hold				

== General elections 2013 ==
Contesting candidates	Party affiliation	Votes polled

== General elections 2008 ==
Contesting candidates	Party affiliation	Votes polled

== See also ==
- PS-101 Karachi East-V
- PS-103 Karachi East-VII
