= Waseemuddin Qureshi =

Pakistani politician

Member of the Provincial Assembly of Sindh
- In office 13 August 2018 – 11 August 2023
- Constituency: PS-123 Karachi Central-I
- In office 29 May 2013 – 28 May 2018

Personal details
- Born: 11 June 1967 (age 59) Karachi, Sindh, Pakistan
- Party: MQM-H (2026-present)
- Other political affiliations: PPP (2023-2025); MQM-P (2018-2023); MQM-L (2011-2018)

Waseemuddin Qureshi is a Pakistani politician who had been a Member of the Provincial Assembly of Sindh, from August 2018 to August 2023 and from May 2013 to May 2018.

== Early life and education ==
He was born on 11 June 1967 in Karachi.

He has a degree of Bachelor of Laws from Sindh Muslim Law College.

== Political career ==
He was elected to the Provincial Assembly of Sindh as a candidate of Muttahida Quami Movement - London (MQM-L) from Constituency PS-98 Karachi-X in the 2013 Sindh provincial election. He received 86,049 votes and defeated Shahid, a candidate of the Pakistan Tehreek-e-Insaf (PTI).

He was re-elected to Provincial Assembly of Sindh as a candidate of Muttahida Qaumi Movement – Pakistan (MQM-P) from PS-123 (Karachi Central-I) in the 2018 Sindh provincial election. He received 28,161 votes and defeated Faisal Muslim, a candidate of the PTI.

On 21 November 2023, he left the MQM-P and joined the PPP.
