= PS-16 Qambar Shahdadkot-III =

Constituency of the Provincial Assembly of Sindh, Pakistan

- MOA constituency for the Provincial Assembly of Sindh
- Region: Qambar Tehsil (partly) including Qambar city and Warah Tehsil (partly) of Qambar Shahdadkot District
- Electorate: 197,908

Current constituency
- Created: 2018
- Party: Pakistan People’s party
- Member: Nawab Ghaibi Sardar Khan Chandio
- Created from: PS-40 Larkana-VI

PS-16 Qambar Shahdadkot-III (پی ایس-16، قمبر-شہدادکوٹ-3) is a constituency of the Provincial Assembly of Sindh.

== General elections 2024 ==
Provincial election 2024: PS-16 Qambar Shahdadkot-III
Party	Candidate	Votes	%	±%
PPP	Nawab Ghaibi Sardar Khan Chandio	38,057	67.54	
PTI	Muhammad Ali Hakro (Note: Filed nomination papers as PTI candidate but ECP allowed him to run as an independent)	12,581	22.33	
TLP	Abdul Hakeem	1,636	2.90	
Independent	Ranjhan Ali	1,399	2.48	
Others	Others (ten candidates)	2,671	4.75	
Turnout		59,324	29.98	
Total valid votes		56,344	94.98	
Rejected ballots		2,980	5.02	
Majority		25,476	45.21	
Registered electors		197,908		

== General elections 2018 ==
Contesting candidates	Party affiliation	Votes polled

== General elections 2013 ==
Contesting candidates	Party affiliation	Votes polled

== General elections 2008 ==
Contesting candidates	Party affiliation	Votes polled

== See also ==
- PS-15 Qambar Shahdadkot-II
- PS-17 Qambar Shahdadkot-IV
