= Maleeha Manzoor =

Member of the Provincial Assembly of Sindh (2024–2029)

- ملیحہ منظور

Member of the Provincial Assembly of Sindh
- Incumbent
- Assumed office 25 February 2024
- Constituency: Reserved seat for women

Personal details
- Party: PPP (2024-present)

Maleeha Manzoor (Urdu: ملیحہ منظور) is a Pakistani politician who is member of the Provincial Assembly of Sindh.

== Political career ==
Maleeha was allotted a reserved seat for women in Provincial Assembly of Sindh after the 2024 Sindh provincial election as part of the reserved quota for Pakistan People’s Party Parliamentarians.
