= Adeel Ahmed (politician) =

Pakistani politician

Member of the Provincial Assembly of Sindh
- In office 13 August 2018 – 11 August 2023
- Constituency: PS-98 Korangi Karachi-VII

Personal details
- Born: Karachi, Sindh, Pakistan
- Party: PTI (2018–present)

Adeel Ahmed is a Pakistani politician who had been a member of the Provincial Assembly of Sindh from August 2018 to August 2023.

== Political career ==
He was elected to the Provincial Assembly of Sindh as a candidate of Pakistan Tehreek-e-Insaf from Constituency PS-98 (Korangi Karachi-VII) in the 2018 Pakistani general election.
