= PS-100 Karachi East-IV =

Constituency of the Provincial Assembly of Sindh, Pakistan

- Constituency for the Provincial Assembly of Sindh
- Region: Gulshan-e-Iqbal town (partly) of Karachi East District in Karachi
- Electorate: 220,953

Current constituency
- Member: Vacant
- Created from: PS-115 Karachi-XXVII (2002–2018); PS-103 Karachi East-V (2018–2023)

PS-100 Karachi East-V (پی ایس-100، کراچی مشرقی-5) is a constituency of the Provincial Assembly of Sindh.

== General elections 2024 ==
Provincial election 2024: PS-100 Karachi East-IV
Party	Candidate	Votes	%	±%
MQM-P	Syed Muhammad Usman	21,970	31.83	
PPP	Haider Ali Urmani	15,241	22.08	
JI	Naeem Akhtar	12,336	17.87	
PTI	Syed Muhammad Taha (Note: Filed nomination papers as PTI candidate but ECP allowed him to run as an independent)	8,250	11.95	
TLP	Muhammad Shahnawaz	2,094	3.03	
PML(N)	Sarwat Jawahir	1,018	1.48	
Others	Others (thirty seven candidates)	8,117	11.76	
Turnout		69,030	31.24	
Total valid votes		69,026	99.99	
Rejected ballots		4	0.01	
Majority		6,729	9.75	
Registered electors		220,953		
MQM-P gain from PTI				

== General elections 2018 ==
General election 2018: PS-103 (Karachi East-V)
Party	Candidate	Votes	%	±%
PTI	Bilal Ahmed Ghaffar	41,454	43.82	
MMA	Muhammad Junaid Mukati	17,729	18.74	
MQM-P	Tanzeel Bin Abdul Rauf	12,568	13.28	
PML(N)	Ali Ashiq	7,365	7.78	
PPP	Muhammad Shahzad	4,697	4.96	
TLP	Muhammad Arif	4,121	4.36	
PSP	Soofia Saeed Shah	4,072	4.30	
GDA	Asghar Ali	977	1.03	
Independent	Lal Bux	429	0.45	
AAT	Ubaid Khalil	420	0.44	
Independent	Zeeshan Bashir Farooqui	250	0.26	
APML	Muhammad Kamal Mughal	113	0.12	
Independent	Khalid Ali	109	0.12	
MQM-H	Muhammad Akber	61	0.06	
Independent	Raza Shah	53	0.06	
Independent	Naeem Ahmed	52	0.06	
Independent	Faisal Ahmed Baig	33	0.03	
PKI-Ch.Anwar	Muhammad Hilal Usmani	33	0.03	
ANP	Masooma Tareen	30	0.03	
Independent	Mirza Asghar Baig	27	0.03	
Independent	Muhammad Altaf Shah	16	0.02	
Total valid votes		94,607		
Rejected ballots		1,446		
Registered electors		233,420		

== See also ==
- PS-99 Karachi East-III
- PS-101 Karachi East-V
