= Muhammad Owais =

Pakistani politician

Muhammad Owais is a Pakistani politician who has been a Member of the Provincial Assembly of Sindh since 2024.

== Political career ==
He was elected to the 16th Provincial Assembly of Sindh as a Pakistan Tehreek-e-Insaf-backed independent candidate from constituency PS-96 Karachi Korangi-VII in the 2024 Pakistani general election.
