= PS-87 Karachi Malir-IV =

Constituency of the Provincial Assembly of Sindh, Pakistan

- Constituency for the Provincial Assembly of Sindh
- Region: Ibrahim Hyderi town (partly) of Malir District in Karachi
- Electorate: 106,855

Current constituency
- Member: Mehmood Alam Jamot
- Created from: PS-129 Karachi-XLI (2002-2018); PS-88 Karachi Malir-II (2018-2023)

PS-87 Karachi Malir-IV (پی ایس-87، کراچی ملير-4) is a constituency of the Provincial Assembly of Sindh.

== General elections 2024 ==
Provincial election 2024: PS-87 Karachi Malir-IV
Party	Candidate	Votes	%	±%
PPP	Mehmood Alam Jamot	19,220	41.12	
PTI	Tause Khan (Note: Filed nomination papers as PTI candidate but ECP allowed him to run as an Independent)	7,703	16.48	
PML(N)	Mehran Ali Shah	7,048	15.08	
PRHP	Mohai Uddin Shah	6,665	14.26	
JI	Miraj Muhammad Khan	3,120	6.68	
TLP	Hafiz Muhammad Imran	1,521	3.25	
Others	Others (thirteen candidates)	1,466	3.13	
Turnout		47,856	44.79	
Total valid votes		46,743	97.67	
Rejected ballots		1,113	2.33	
Majority		11,517	24.64	
Registered electors		106,855		
PPP hold				

== General elections 2018 ==
Provincial election 2018: PS-88 Malir-II
Party	Candidate	Votes	%	±%
PPP	Ghulam Murtaza Baloch	22,563	34.84	
PTI	Muhammad Rizwan Khan	16,392	25.31	
TLP	Rizwan Ahmed	7,694	11.88	
MQM-P	Syed Abul Hassan	5,207	8.04	
PML(N)	Rana Muhammad Ehsan	4,962	7.66	
MMA	Altaf Hussain Patni	2,650	4.09	
GDA	Muhammad Yaqoob	2,560	3.95	
PSP	Farhan Javed	972	1.5	
Independent	Dawood Paul	779	1.2	
Independent	Samina Khaskheli	332	0.51	
Independent	Muhammad Younis Memon	175	0.27	
Independent	Rahman Dino Mahesar	168	0.26	
Independent	Abdul Ghafoor	87	0.13	
MQM-H	Rao Muhammad Kashif Hayat	75	0.12	
Independent	Muhammad Ibrahim	72	0.11	
Independent	Muhammad Saleem Memon	39	0.06	
Independent	Aijaz Ali	26	0.04	
Independent	Madad Ali Bughio	11	0.02	
Majority		6,171	9.53	
Valid ballots		64,765		
Rejected ballots		1,321		
Turnout		66,086		
Registered electors		148,465		
hold				

== General elections 2013 ==
Contesting candidates	Party affiliation	Votes polled
Shafi Muhammad Jamot	Pakistan Muslim League (N)	22994
Muhammad Rafique	Pakistan Peoples Party	15499
Gul Mohammad Mengal	Muttahida Qaumi Movement Pakistan	15384
Ghulam Mustafa	Pakistan Tehreek-e-Insaf	6543
Molana Syed Muhiudin Shah Al Hussaini	Muttahida Deeni Mahaz	5254
Haleem Adil Shaikh	Pakistan Muslim League (Q)	2699
Usman Ghani	Independent	871
Bilal Qasim Kachhi	Independent	561
Nisar Ahmed	Pakistan Peoples Party (Shaheed Bhutto)	537
Akbar Dars	Pakistan Muslim League (Sher-e-Bangal)	518
Zahid Iqbal	Pakistan Sunni Tehreek	369
Haji Saeed Ahmed Gujjar	Pakistan Muslim League (F)	329
Sardar Muhammad Iqbal Khan	Tehreek-e-Suba Hazara	208
Mastan Khan	Independent	163
Zeenat Bano	Independent	124
Mohammed Saeed Khan Afghan	Awami National Party	106
Ahmed Khan	Independent	101
Mufti Zia Ul Islam Takarvi	Independent	82
Molana Iftikhar Ahmed Noorani	Independent	60
Sir Malik Asghar Mehmood	Independent	49
Muhammad Jaffar Jatoi	Pakistan Conservative Party	48
Sher Wali Khan Wazeer	Pashtunkhwa Milli Awami Party	45
Akhtar Roheela	All Pakistan Muslim League	39
Doctor Qaiser Khan	Independent	37
Syed Khan	Independent	34
Bakhtiar	Independent	34
Banaras Khan	Hazara Qaumi Mahaz	27
Sarwar Kamal	Pak Muslim Alliance	24
Fazal Rahim Shakir	Independent	23
Zafar Ali	Independent	21
Irshad Ahmed	Independent	14
Syed Imdad Hussain Shah	Independent	9
Malik Muhammad Taj	Independent	6
Advocate Haseena Mashuri	Independent	6
Mansoor Ahmed	Independent	3
Jawaid Arsala Khan	Independent	3
Source (UrduPoint)

== See also ==
- PS-86 Karachi Malir-III
- PS-88 Karachi Malir-V
