= PS-97 Karachi East-I =

Constituency of the Provincial Assembly of Sindh, Pakistan

- Constituency for the Provincial Assembly of Sindh
- District: Gulzar-e-Hijri town (partly) of Karachi East District in Karachi
- Electorate: 55,963

Current constituency
- Created: 2018
- Member: Vacant
- Created from: PS-99 Karachi East-I (2018–2023)

PS-97 Karachi East-I (پی ایس-97، کراچی مشرقی-1) is a constituency of the Provincial Assembly of Sindh.

== General elections 2024 ==
Provincial election 2024: PS-97 Karachi East-I
Party	Candidate	Votes	%	±%
MQM-P	Rana Shoukat Ali	5,000	27.11	
PPP	Bashir Ahmed	4,603	24.96	
PTI	Bashir Ahmed Sodar (Note: Filed nomination papers as PTI candidate but ECP allows him to run as independent)	2,129	11.55	
JI	Muhammad Khalid Siddiqui	2,030	11.01	
PML(N)	Fahad Shafiq	1,760	9.54	
JUI (F)	Muhammad Aslam Ghauri	868	4.71	
TLP	Naseeb Ullah	768	4.17	
Independent	Majid Khan	218	1.18	
Others	Others (thirthy two candidates)	1,065	5.77	
Turnout		19,115	34.16	
Total valid votes		18,441	96.47	
Rejected ballots		674	3.53	
Majority		397	2.15	
Registered electors		55,963		
MQM-P gain from PTI				

== General elections 2018 ==
General election 2018: PS-99 (Karachi East-I)
Party	Candidate	Votes	%	±%
PTI	Haleem Adil Sheikh	6,029	28.63	
PPP	Shahab Uddin	5,402	25.65	
MMA	Muhammad Ghayas	2,779	13.20	
PML(N)	Muhammad Jamil Gill	2,743	13.02	
TLP	Muhammad Akram	870	4.13	
PSP	Taj Muhammad	747	3.55	
MQM-P	Syed Mussadiq Shah	589	2.80	
Independent	Mohi Uddin Ahmed	493	2.34	
AAT	Ali Muhammad Gabol	312	1.48	
PRHP	Muhammad Hanif	193	0.92	
Independent	Jalil Ahmed Mugheri	174	0.83	
ANP	Zafar Ali	137	0.65	
Independent	Jan Muhammad	130	0.62	
PKI-Ch.Anwar	Muhammad Aslam	81	0.38	
PMA	Muhammad Zahid Awan	77	0.37	
Independent	Muhammad Ramzan	45	0.21	
Independent	Atta ur Rehman	43	0.20	
Independent	Muhammad Ismail Brohi	38	0.18	
MQM-H	Muhammad Marjan	33	0.16	
PML-SB	Muhammad Hussain	30	0.14	
Independent	Deedar Ali	29	0.14	
PMAP	Sardar Muhammad	22	0.10	
Independent	Pir Umar Uddin Zafar	13	0.06	
Independent	Dildar	12	0.06	
Independent	Manzoor Burfat	10	0.05	
Independent	Pir Muhammad Farrukh Shah Serhandi	9	0.04	
Independent	Sati Khan	9	0.04	
Independent	Muhammad Aslam Bhutto	5	0.02	
Independent	Muhammad Hammad Khan Sherwani	4	0.02	
Independent	Raees Anwar Ullah Khan	3	0.01	
Total valid votes		21,061	38.02	
Rejected ballots		820		
Registered electors		57,544		

== General elections 2013 ==
General election 2013: PS-99 (Karachi-XI)
Party	Candidate	Votes	%	±%
MQM	Khawaja Izharul Hassan	86,033		
PTI	M Saleem Ghori	9336		
PML(N)	Rahat Hussain Siddiqui	934		
PPP	Sohail Sami Dehalvi Arain	742		
Independent	Dr Muhammad Naveed Saleem Advocate	47		
Independent	Muhammad Kachhi	31		
Independent	Muhammad Naseem	30		
Independent	Nawab Khan Bozdar	27		
Independent	Syed Absar Ul Hassan	18		

== See also ==
- PS-96 Karachi Korangi-VII
- PS-98 Karachi East-II
