= Muhammad Farooq Awan =

Pakistani politician

Muhammad Farooq Awan is a Pakistani politician who has been a Member of the Provincial Assembly of Sindh since 2024.

== Political career ==
Awan had served as an SSP (Senior Superintendent of Police) before entering politics..

He was elected to the 16th Provincial Assembly of Sindh as a candidate of the Pakistan People's Party from Constituency PS-95 Karachi Korangi-VI in the 2024 Pakistani general election.

In April 2024, a Mercedes vehicle was discovered at the farmhouse owned by Awan following a road accident resulting in the death of an 8-year-old child. In response, the PTI called for Awan to be included in the police investigation.
