= Muhammad Sajid Jokhio =

Pakistani politician

Member of the Provincial Assembly of Sindh
- Incumbent
- Assumed office 25 February 2024
- Constituency: PS-85 Karachi Malir-II
- In office 13 August 2018 – 11 August 2023
- Constituency: PS-87 Karachi Malir-I
- In office 29 May 2013 – 28 May 2018
- Constituency: PS-130 Karachi-XLII

Personal details
- Born: 3 February 1971 (age 55) Karachi, Sindh, Pakistan
- Party: PPP (2013-present)

Muhammad Sajid Jokhio is a Pakistani politician who is member of the Provincial Assembly of Sindh, he also had been a Member of the Provincial Assembly of Sindh from August 2018 to August 2023 and from May 2013 to May 2018.

== Early life ==
He was born 3 February 1971 in Karachi.

== Political career ==
He was elected to the Provincial Assembly of Sindh as a candidate of Pakistan Peoples Party from Constituency PS-130 KARACHI-XLII in the 2013 Pakistani general election and PS-87 Karachi Malir-I in the 2018 Pakistani general election
