= PS-99 Karachi East-III =

Constituency of the Provincial Assembly of Sindh, Pakistan

- Constituency for the Provincial Assembly of Sindh
- Region: Gulshan-e-Iqbal and Gulzar-e-Hijri towns (partly) of Karachi East District in Karachi
- Electorate: 198,327

Current constituency
- Member: Vacant
- Created from: PS-126 Karachi-XXXVIII (2002-2018); PS-101 Karachi East-III (2018-2023)

PS-99 Karachi East-III (پی ایس-99، کراچی مشرقی-3) is a constituency of the Provincial Assembly of Sindh.

== General elections 2024 ==
Provincial election 2024: PS-99 Karachi East-III
Party	Candidate	Votes	%	±%
MQM-P	Syed Farhan Ansari	26,658	37.80	
JI	Muhammad Yunus Barai	22,321	31.65	
PPP	Masti Khan Masood	7,337	10.40	
PTI	Zain Parvez (Note: Filed nomination papers to PTI candidate but ECP allowed him to run an as independent)	5,038	7.14	
TLP	Abdul Rahi	4,708	6.68	
PML(N)	Muhammad Amin	1,493	2.12	
Others	Others (twenty candidates)	2,971	4.21	
Turnout		71,201	35.90	
Total valid votes		70,526	99.05	
Rejected ballots		675	0.95	
Majority		4,337	6.15	
Registered electors		198,327		
MQM-P gain from PTI				

== General elections 2018 ==
General elections are scheduled to be held on 25 July 2018.

General election 2018: PS-101 (Karachi East-III)
Party	Candidate	Votes	%	±%
PTI	Firdous Naqvi	28,036	44.84	
MQM-P	Muhammad Haroon Siddiqui	11,534	18.45	
MMA	Babar Qamar Alam	7,186	11.49	
PPP	Muhammad Ayub Khosa	5,121	8.19	
PSP	Muhammad Salman	3,636	5.82	
PML(N)	Perveen Basheer	3,333	5.33	
TLP	Muhammad Asif	2,105	3.37	
AAT	Fahad Yousuf	777	1.24	
ANP	Muhammad Tahir Khan	270	0.43	
Independent	Noman Badar Farooqui	218	0.35	
APML	Mirza Mustafa Zaheer	131	0.21	
Independent	Mir Khuda Bux Murri	49	0.08	
Independent	Muhammad Ahmed	41	0.07	
Independent	Aamir Masood Sheikh	26	0.04	
Independent	Attaullah Khan	23	0.04	
Independent	Muhammad Irfan	17	0.03	
Independent	Muhammad Faheem	12	0.02	
Independent	Rehan Zafar Ahmed Ghori	5	0.01	
Total valid votes		62,520		
Majority		16502	26.39	
Registered electors		155,961		
Turnout		62387	40	

== See also ==
- PS-98 Karachi East-II
- PS-100 Karachi East-IV
