= Qurratulain Khan =

Member of the Provincial Assembly of Sindh (2024–2029)

- قُرَّۃُ العین خان

Member of the Provincial Assembly of Sindh
- Incumbent
- Assumed office 25 February 2024
- Constituency: Reserved seat for women

Personal details
- Born: Hyderabad, Sindh, Pakistan
- Party: MQM-P (2024-present)

Qurratulain Khan (Urdu: قُرَّۃُ العین خان) is a Pakistani politician who is member of the Provincial Assembly of Sindh.

== Political career ==
Khan was allotted a reserved seat for women in Provincial Assembly of Sindh after the 2024 Sindh provincial election as part of the reserved quota for Muttahida Qaumi Movement – Pakistan.
