= PS-96 Karachi Korangi-VII =

Constituency of the Provincial Assembly of Sindh, Pakistan

- Constituency for the Provincial Assembly of Sindh
- Region: Korangi Town (partly), Landhi Town (partly), Faisal Cantonment (partly) and Shah Faisal Town (partly) of Korangi District in Karachi

Current constituency
- Seats: 1
- Party: Vacant
- Member: Vacant
- Created from: PS-119 Karachi-XXXI (2002-2018); PS-98 Karachi Korangi-VII (2018-2023)

PS-96 Karachi Korangi-VII (پی ایس-96، کراچی کورنگی-7) is a constituency of the Provincial Assembly of Sindh.

== General elections 2024 ==
Provincial election 2024: PS-96 Karachi Korangi-VII
| Party | Candidate | Votes | % | ±% |
|---|---|---|---|---|
| Independent | Muhammad Owais (Note: Filed nomination papers as PTI candidate but ECP allowed him to run as an Independent) | 16,997 | 29.47 | |
| JI | Shafiq Ahmed | 9,644 | 16.72 | |
| PPP | Muhammad Sharjeel Humayun | 6,683 | 11.59 | |
| PML(N) | Ali Akbar | 5,725 | 9.93 | |
| MQM-P | Shabbir Qaimkhani | 4,093 | 7.10 | |
| TLP | Muhammad Waris Khan | 2,887 | 5.01 | |
| Independent | Muhammad Danish Khan | 2,625 | 4.55 | |
| PRHP | Ameer Muavia | 2,156 | 3.74 | |
| Independent | Abdul Rehman Khan | 1,543 | 2.68 | |
| MQM-H | Asim Hussain | 923 | 1.60 | |
| Sulaiman Khel Qabail Movement | Ahsan Khan | 861 | 1.49 | |
| ANP | Muhammad Asad | 669 | 1.16 | |
| Others | Others (thirty candidates) | 2,872 | 4.96 | |
| Turnout | | 58,919 | 33.43 | |
| Total valid votes | | 57,678 | 97.89 | |
| Rejected ballots | | 1,241 | 2.11 | |
| Majority | | 7,353 | 12.75 | |
| Registered electors | | 176,250 | | |

== General elections 2018 ==
Provincial election 2018: PS-99 Karachi Korangi-VII
| Party | Candidate | Votes | % | ±% |
|---|---|---|---|---|
| PTI | Adeel Ahmed | 14,415 | 25.04 | |
| MQM-P | Masood Mahmood | 13,006 | 22.59 | |
| PML(N) | Muhammad Iqbal | 7,620 | 13.24 | |
| MMA | Abdul Haq Usmani | 5,972 | 10.37 | |
| TLP | Zafar Iqbal | 4,970 | 8.63 | |
| PPP | Muhammad Haroon Khan | 4,911 | 8.53 | |
| PSP | Yasir Uddin | 2,086 | 3.62 | |
| MQM-H | Syed Muhammad Zahoor | 1,000 | 1.74 | |
| ANP | Bahri Kamal | 901 | 1.57 | |
| Independent | Fazal Ali | 605 | 1.05 | |
| PML-SB | Abdul Haq Bayyani | 498 | 0.87 | |
| Independent | Muhammad Saad Ali | 404 | 0.70 | |
| PPP(SB) | Roshan Ali | 372 | 0.65 | |
| Independent | Asif Ali | 316 | 0.55 | |
| Independent | Umar Ahmed Siddique | 133 | 0.23 | |
| Jamiat Ulema-e-Pakistan | Mehtab Ahmed | 105 | 0.18 | |
| Independent | Muhammad Waqar Azeem | 84 | 0.15 | |
| Independent | Kareem Bux | 66 | 0.11 | |
| Pasban-e-Pakistan | Kaleem Ullah | 42 | 0.07 | |
| GDA | Fahmida Zahir | 32 | 0.06 | |
| Independent | Rehan Mansoor | 30 | 0.05 | |
| Majority | | 1,409 | 2.45 | |
| Valid ballots | | 57,568 | | |
| Rejected ballots | | 1,018 | | |
| Turnout | | 58,586 | | |
| Registered electors | | 158,213 | | |
| hold | | | | |

== General elections 2013 ==
| Contesting candidates | Party affiliation | Votes polled |

== General elections 2008 ==
| Contesting candidates | Party affiliation | Votes polled |

== See also ==
- PS-95 Karachi Korangi-VI
- PS-97 Karachi East-I
