= Muhammad Yousuf Murtaza Baloch =

Member of the Provincial Assembly of Sindh from Tando Muhammad Khan (2024–2029)

- محمد یوسف مرتضٰی بلوچ

Member of the Provincial Assembly of Sindh
- Incumbent
- Assumed office 25 February 2024
- Constituency: PS-84 Karachi Malir-I

Personal details
- Born: Karachi, Sindh, Pakistan
- Party: PPP (2024-present)
- Parent: Muhammad Anwer (father)

Muhammad Yousuf Murtaza Baloch (Urdu: محمد یوسف مرتضٰی بلوچ) is a Pakistani politician who is member of the Provincial Assembly of Sindh, he is also a Parliamentary Secretary for Mines and Minerals.

== Political career ==
Baloch won the 2024 Sindh provincial election from PS-84-Malir1 as a Pakistan People’s Party Parliamentarians candidate. He received 25348 votes while runner up Zain ul Abidin Kolachi of Independent politician Supported (PTI) Pakistan Tehreek-e-Insaf, received 13437 votes.
