= PS-98 Karachi East-II =

Constituency of the Provincial Assembly of Sindh, Pakistan

- Constituency for the Provincial Assembly of Sindh
- District: Karachi East
- Region: Gulzar-e-Hijri town (partly) of Karachi East District in Karachi
- Electorate: 90,617

Current constituency
- Member: Vacant
- Created from: PS-100 Karachi-XII (2002-2018); PS-100 Karachi East-II (2018-2023)

PS-98 Karachi East-II (پی ایس-98، کراچی مشرقی-2) is a constituency of the Provincial Assembly of Sindh.

== General elections 2024 ==
Provincial election 2024: PS-98 Karachi East-II
Party	Candidate	Votes	%	±%
MQM-P	Arsalan Perwaiz Siddiqui	13,903	44.95	
JI	Hammad Ullah Khan	5,551	17.95	
PTI	Jansher Junejo (Note: Filed nomination papers as PTI candidate but ECP allowed him to run as an Independent)	4,450	14.39	
PPP	Hakim Ali Jiskani	3,923	12.68	
PML(N)	Kareem Bux Gabol	857	2.77	
TLP	Abu Muhammad Farhan Syed	604	1.95	
Independent	Muhammad Irfan	362	1.17	
Others	Others (twenty three candidates)	1,279	4.14	
Turnout		31,484	34.74	
Total valid votes		30,929	98.24	
Rejected ballots		555	1.76	
Majority		8,352	27.00	
Registered electors		90,622		
MQM-P gain from JI				

== General elections 2018 ==
General election 2018: PS-100 Karachi East-II
Party	Candidate	Votes	%	±%
PTI	Kareem Bux Gabol	17,200	35.86	
PPP	Taj Muhammad	7,351	15.32	
MQM-P	Sana Ali	6,612	13.78	
MMA	Muhammad Yunus Barai	6,354	13.25	
PSP	Shahzad Raza	2,387	4.98	
PML(N)	Abdul Jabbar	2,320	4.84	
TLP	Saad Mairaj	2,103	4.38	
Independent	Syed Muhammad Azam Abbas	591	1.23	
SUP	Mehboob Ali	589	1.23	
AAT	Muhammad	466	0.97	
Independent	Shahzad	323	0.67	
ANP	Rauf Khan	299	0.62	
Independent	Muhammad Jamil Babar	275	0.57	
Independent	Parvaiz Ahmed Rajpar	269	0.56	
APML	Sammad Raza	258	0.54	
Independent	Muhammad Rooh Allah Turabi	154	0.32	
GDA	Ali Gul	120	0.25	
Independent	Asadullah Alvi	74	0.15	
Independent	Muhammad Arif Khan	71	0.15	
Independent	Bashir Ahmed Khaskheli	41	0.09	
Independent	Syed Khalil Ahmed Shah	41	0.09	
PFP	Seema Majeed	31	0.06	
Independent	Abdul Qadir Khanzada	9	0.02	
PJDP	Munawwar Ali Khan Shar	9	0.02	
Independent	Maula Bux Chand	7	0.01	
Independent	Muhammad Noman Siddiqui	6	0.01	
Independent	Arsalan Pervaiz	5	0.01	
Independent	Hakim Ali	3	0.01	
Independent	Allah Dino Soomro	2	0.01	
Total valid votes		47,970	38.79	
Rejected ballots		844		
Registered electors		125,829		

== General elections 2013 ==
General election 2013: PS-100 (Karachi-XII)
Party	Candidate	Votes	%	±%
MQM	Muhammad Adil Siddiqui	78,785		
Independent	Anwar Hussain Alias Annu	7589		
JI	Ahmed Qari	6845		
PST	Muhammad Tayyab Hussain Qadri	1548		
Independent	Syed Muhammad Nomanul Haq	972		
PPP	Ashfaq Qadri	558		
Independent	Mansoor Ahmed Chipa	102		
Independent	Razia Sultana	75		
Independent	Moulana Abdul Waheed	42		
Independent	Muhammad Zulfiqar	37		

== See also ==
- PS-97 Karachi East-I
- PS-99 Karachi East-III
