= PS-85 Karachi Malir-II =

Constituency of the Provincial Assembly of Sindh, Pakistan

- Constituency for the Provincial Assembly of Sindh
- Region: Gadap Town (partly), Bin Qasim (partly) and Murad Memon Town of Malir District in Karachi
- Electorate: 151,805

Current constituency
- Created: 2023
- Member: Muhammad Sajid Jokhio
- Created from: PS-130 Karachi-XLII (2002-2018); PS-87 Karachi Malir-I (2018-2023)

PS-85 Karachi Malir-II (پی ایس-85، کراچی ملير-2) is a constituency of the Provincial Assembly of Sindh that was created after 2023 Delimitations when Malir District gained 1 seat.

== General elections 2024 ==
Provincial election 2024: PS-85 Karachi Malir-II
Party	Candidate	Votes	%	±%
PPP	Muhammad Sajid Jokhio	27,773	43.96	
PML(N)	Pir Hafeez Ullah	14,361	22.73	
PTI	Mehwish Hassan Rao (Note: Filed nomination papers as PTI candidate but ECP allowed him to run as an Independent)	9,374	14.84	
JI	Faiz Ahmed Faiz	4,326	6.85	
TLP	Dilber Shah	3,437	5.44	
Independent	Jameela	2,482	3.93	
Others	Others (twenty two candidates)	1,422	2.25	
Turnout		64,540	42.52	
Total valid votes		63,175	97.89	
Rejected ballots		1,365	2.11	
Majority		13,412	21.23	
Registered electors		151,806		
PPP hold				

== See also ==
- PS-84 Karachi Malir-I
- PS-86 Karachi Malir-III
