= PS-17 Qambar Shahdadkot-IV =

Constituency of the Provincial Assembly of Sindh, Pakistan

- Constituency for the Provincial Assembly of Sindh
- Region: Nasirabad Tehsil, and Warah Tehsil (partly) of Qambar Shahdadkot District
- Electorate: 202,418

Current constituency
- Member: Vacant
- Created from: PS-42 Larkana-VII

PS-17 Qambar Shahdadkot-IV (پی ایس-17، قمبر-شہدادکوٹ-4) is a constituency of the Provincial Assembly of Sindh.

== General elections 2024 ==
Provincial election 2024: PS-17 Qambar Shahdadkot-IV
Party	Candidate	Votes	%	±%
PPP	Burhan Chandio	43,885	62.76	
GDA	Javed Hussain Khokhar	21,658	30.97	
AWP	Seengar Ali	1,105	1.58	
TLP	Ghulam Siddique	1,013	1.45	
Others	Others (nine candidates)	2,263	3.24	
Turnout		73,856	36.06	
Total valid votes		69,924	94.68	
Rejected ballots		3,932	5.32	
Majority		22,227	31.79	
Registered electors		204,810		

== General elections 2018 ==
Contesting candidates	Party affiliation	Votes polled

== General elections 2013 ==
Contesting candidates	Party affiliation	Votes polled

== General elections 2008 ==
Contesting candidates	Party affiliation	Votes polled

== See also ==
- PS-16 Qambar Shahdadkot-III
- PS-18 Ghotki-I
