= PS-84 Karachi Malir-I =

Constituency of the Provincial Assembly of Sindh, Pakistan

- Constituency for the Provincial Assembly of Sindh
- Region: Gadap Town (partly), Shah Murad Town, Malir Cantonment, Faisal Cantonment (partly) and Airport of Malir District in Karachi
- Electorate: 133,063

Current constituency
- Member: Muhammad Yousuf Murtaza Baloch
- Created from: PS-130 Karachi-XLII (2002-2018); PS-87 Karachi Malir-I (2018-2023)

PS-84 Karachi Malir-I (پی ایس-87، کراچی ملير-1) is a constituency of the Provincial Assembly of Sindh.

== General elections 2024 ==
Provincial election 2024: PS-84 Karachi Malir-I
Party	Candidate	Votes	%	±%
PPP	Muhammad Yousuf Murtaza Baloch	26,358	45.53	
PTI	Zain Ul Abedin Kolachi (Note: Filed nomination papers as PTI candidate but ECP allowed him to run as an Independent)	13,907	24.02	
JI	Saqib Hussain Ansari	8,677	14.99	
PML(N)	Khurram Abbas	4,143	7.16	
TLP	Ghulam Akbar	2,002	3.46	
Others	Others (eleven candidates)	2,806	4.84	
Turnout		59,278	44.55	
Total valid votes		57,893	97.66	
Rejected ballots		1,385	2.34	
Majority		12,451	21.51	
Registered electors		133,063		
PPP hold				

== General elections 2018 ==
Provincial election 2018: PS-87 Malir-I
Party	Candidate	Votes	%	±%
PPP	Muhammad Sajid Jokhio	32,243	67.49	
PTI	Qadir Bukhs Khan Gabol	12,477	26.11	
TLP	Qurban Ali	1,353	2.83	
MMA	Hamid Ullah	454	0.95	
Independent	Hussain Buksh Jokhio	210	0.44	
PML(N)	Abdul Khalil Barohi	180	0.38	
Independent	Rao Muhammad Zubair	143	0.3	
Independent	Shokat Ali Jutt	143	0.3	
Independent	Muhammad Naveed Shahid	143	0.3	
SUP	Ghulam Muhammad Javed	91	0.19	
MQM-P	Khalida Ateeb	69	0.14	
Independent	Farzana Perveen	44	0.09	
Independent	Syed Mehar Ali Shah	37	0.08	
ANP	Saiqa Noor	27	0.06	
Independent	Abdul Hafeez Jokhio	25	0.06	
Independent	Mubarik Gabol	23	0.05	
Independent	Imran Malik	17	0.04	
GDA	Wali Ur Rehman	16	0.03	
Independent	Ali Ahmad Jokhio	14	0.03	
Independent	Muhammad Sadiqque	14	0.03	
PSP	Muhammad Saleem	13	0.03	
Independent	Pervaiz	12	0.03	
Independent	Kher Muhammad	11	0.02	
Independent	Syed Ayaz Ali Shah	8	0.02	
Independent	Muhammad Essa Jokhio	6	0.01	
Independent	Nazar Ali Magsi	5	0.01	
Majority		19,766	41.38	
Valid ballots		47,778		
Rejected ballots		504		
Turnout		48,282		
Registered electors		146,852		
hold				

== General elections 2013 ==
Contesting candidates	Party affiliation	Votes polled

== General elections 2008 ==
Contesting candidates	Party affiliation	Votes polled

== See also ==
- PS-83 Dadu-IV
- PS-85 Karachi Malir-II
