= PS-86 Karachi Malir-III =

Constituency of the Provincial Assembly of Sindh, Pakistan

- Constituency for the Provincial Assembly of Sindh
- Region: Bin Qasim town (partly), Ibrahim Hyderi town (partly) of Malir District in Karachi
- Electorate: 85,904

Current constituency
- Member: Abdul Razak Raja
- Created from: PS-129 Karachi-XLI (2002-2018); PS-89 Karachi Malir-III (2018-2023)

PS-86 Karachi Malir-III (پی ایس-86، کراچی ملير-3) is a constituency of the Provincial Assembly of Sindh.

== General elections 2024 ==
Provincial election 2024: PS-86 Karachi Malir-III
Party	Candidate	Votes	%	±%
PPP	Abdul Razaq Raja	15,017	45.50	
PML(N)	Muhammad Yaqoob	6,633	20.10	
PTI	Muhammad Hanif (Note: Filed nomination papers as PTI candidate but ECP allowed him to run as an Independent)	4,010	12.15	
JI	Khalid Khan	3,359	10.18	
TLP	Muhammad Afzal	1,965	5.95	
Independent	Muhammad Uear	825	2.50	
Others	Others (eighteen candidates)	1,194	3.62	
Turnout		33,799	39.35	
Total valid votes		33,003	97.65	
Rejected ballots		796	2.35	
Majority		8,384	25.40	
Registered electors		85,905		
PPP hold				

== General elections 2018 ==
Provincial election 2018: PS-89 Malir-III
Party	Candidate	Votes	%	±%
PPP	Muhammad Saleem	23,937	29.35	
PTI	Syed Ali Hussain	18,800	23.05	
PML(N)	Jawaid Arsala Khan	12,766	15.65	
MQM-P	Shahid Nawaz	8,471	10.39	
TLP	Muhammad Hassan Azeem	5,978	7.33	
MMA	Mumtaz Hussain Sahito	4,833	5.93	
ANP	Kachkol Muhammad	2,049	2.51	
PRHP	Tariq Masood	1,837	2.25	
PSP	Muhammad Azeem	894	1.1	
AAT	Muhammad Anees	599	0.73	
Independent	Muhammad Ilyas	539	0.66	
MQM-H	Maqbool Ahmed	282	0.35	
Independent	Syed Ghufran Shah	137	0.17	
Independent	Muhammad Asim Siddiqui	89	0.11	
Independent	Tariq Aziz	25	0.06	
Independent	Muhammad Iqbal Khan Jadoon	75	0.09	
Independent	Syed Mukarram Hussain Rizvi	46	0.06	
Independent	Meer Abdul Hai Baloch	37	0.05	
Pakistan Conservative Party	Rehan Ahmed	35	0.04	
Independent	Amanullah Khan	32	0.04	
Independent	Amanullah	19	0.02	
PMAP	Muhammad Abid	16	0.02	
Majority		5,137	6.3	
Valid ballots		81,551		
Rejected ballots		1,643		
Turnout		83,194		
Registered electors		193,716		
hold				

== General elections 2013 ==
Contesting candidates	Party affiliation	Votes polled
Shafi Muhammad Jamot	Pakistan Muslim League (N)	22994
Muhammad Rafique	Pakistan Peoples Party	15499
Gul Mohammad Mengal	Muttahida Qaumi Movement Pakistan	15384
Ghulam Mustafa	Pakistan Tehreek-e-Insaf	6543
Molana Syed Muhiudin Shah Al Hussaini	Muttahida Deeni Mahaz	5254
Haleem Adil Shaikh	Pakistan Muslim League (Q)	2699
Usman Ghani	Independent	871
Bilal Qasim Kachhi	Independent	561
Nisar Ahmed	Pakistan Peoples Party (Shaheed Bhutto)	537
Akbar Dars	Pakistan Muslim League (Sher-e-Bangal)	518
Zahid Iqbal	Pakistan Sunni Tehreek	369
Haji Saeed Ahmed Gujjar	Pakistan Muslim League (F)	329
Sardar Muhammad Iqbal Khan	Tehreek-e-Suba Hazara	208
Mastan Khan	Independent	163
Zeenat Bano	Independent	124
Mohammed Saeed Khan Afghan	Awami National Party	106
Ahmed Khan	Independent	101
Mufti Zia Ul Islam Takarvi	Independent	82
Molana Iftikhar Ahmed Noorani	Independent	60
Sir Malik Asghar Mehmood	Independent	49
Muhammad Jaffar Jatoi	Pakistan Conservative Party	48
Sher Wali Khan Wazeer	Pashtunkhwa Milli Awami Party	45
Akhtar Roheela	All Pakistan Muslim League	39
Doctor Qaiser Khan	Independent	37
Syed Khan	Independent	34
Bakhtiar	Independent	34
Banaras Khan	Hazara Qaumi Mahaz	27
Sarwar Kamal	Pak Muslim Alliance	24
Fazal Rahim Shakir	Independent	23
Zafar Ali	Independent	21
Irshad Ahmed	Independent	14
Syed Imdad Hussain Shah	Independent	9
Malik Muhammad Taj	Independent	6
Advocate Haseena Mashuri	Independent	6
Mansoor Ahmed	Independent	3
Jawaid Arsala Khan	Independent	3
Source (UrduPoint)

== General elections 2008 ==
Contesting candidates	Party affiliation	Votes polled

== See also ==
- PS-85 Karachi Malir-II
- PS-87 Karachi Malir-IV
