= PS-124 Karachi Central-III =

Constituency of the Provincial Assembly of Sindh, Pakistan

- Constituency for the Provincial Assembly of Sindh
- Region: New Karachi Town (partly) and North Nazimabad Town town (partly) of Karachi Central District in Karachi
- Electorate: 153,514

Current constituency
- Member: Vacant
- Created from: PS-102 Karachi-XIV (2002-2018); PS-124 Karachi Central-II (2018-2023)

PS-124 Karachi Central-III (پی ایس-124، کراچی وسطی-3) is a constituency of the Provincial Assembly of Sindh. It was created after 2023 delimitations when Karachi Central gained 1 seat after 2023 Pakistani census

== General elections 2024 ==
Provincial election 2024: PS-124 Karachi Central-III
Party	Candidate	Votes	%	±%
MQM-P	Abdul Basit	31,035	35.45	
JI	Muhammad Ahmed	18,438	21.06	
PTI	Muhammad Wajahat Ali (Note: Filed nomination papers as PTI candidate but ECP allowed him to run as an Independent)	15,770	18.01	
TLP	Muhammad Amjad Ali	9,626	11.00	
PRHP	Abdul Ghaffar	2,650	3.03	
Independent	Munawer Nawab	2,501	2.86	
Independent	Wilayat Ali	1,642	1.88	
PPP	Muhammad Faizan Saeed	1,465	1.67	
Independent	Rubina Shabbir	1,131	1.29	
Others	Others (twenty one candidates)	3,290	3.75	
Turnout		88,751	42.81	
Total valid votes		87,548	98.65	
Rejected ballots		1,203	1.35	
Majority		12,597	14.39	
Registered electors		207,319		
MQM-P win (new seat)				

== See also ==
- PS-123 Karachi Central-II
- PS-125 Karachi Central-IV
