= Nawab Ghaibi Sardar Khan Chandio =

Pakistani politician

Member of the Provincial Assembly of Sindh
- In office 13 August 2018 – 11 August 2023
- Constituency: PS-16 Qambar Shahdadkot-III
- In office 29 May 2013 – 28 May 2018
- Constituency: PS-42 Qambar Shahdadkot-III

Personal details
- Born: 19 April 1969 (age 57) Qambar Shahdadkot District, Sindh, Pakistan
- Party: PPP (2013 present)
- Relations: Burhan Chandio (brother)

Nawab Ghaibi Sardar Khan Chandio was born on 19 April 1969 in Qambar Shahdadkot District, Sindh, Pakistan. He completed his early education in Sindh and later obtained a Bachelor of Arts degree. He belongs to a feudal lord family of the Chandio tribe and later became its chief, holding a prominent tribal leadership position in the region. His brother, Burhan Chandio, is also a politician and has served as a Member of the Provincial Assembly of Sindh.

He was named, along with his brother, as an accused in a high-profile triple murder case in 2018 in Mehar, Dadu district, which remained under judicial proceedings for several years, during which he was granted bail. In 2026, a local court acquitted all accused in the case.

== Early life and education ==
He was born on 19 April 1969, in Qambar Shahdadkot District. He holds a Bachelor of Arts degree.

He is the chieftain of the Baloch tribe Chandio.

== Political career ==
He was elected to the Provincial Assembly of Sindh as a candidate of the Pakistan Peoples Party (PPP) from Constituency PS-42 Qambar Shahdadkot-III in the 2013 Sindh provincial election.

He was re-elected to the Provincial Assembly of Sindh as a candidate of the PPP from PS-16 Qambar Shahdadkot-III in the 2018 Sindh provincial election.

== Criminal allegations ==
The 2018 triple murder case drew widespread attention in Sindh after advocate and activist Umme Rubab Chandio accused PPP lawmakers Sardar Ahmed Khan Chandio and Burhan Khan Chandio, along with several others, of involvement in the killings of her father Mukhtiar Ahmed Chandio, grandfather Karamullah Chandio, and uncle Kamaluddin Chandio in Mehar. The accused denied the allegations and maintained their innocence throughout the trial.

In March 2026, a Model Criminal Court in Dadu acquitted all eight accused after a seven-year trial and nearly 400 hearings. Following the verdict, Umme Rubab Chandio said she would challenge the acquittal in higher courts.
