= Rehan Akram Mirza =

Pakistani politician

Member of the Provincial Assembly of Sindh
- In office 18 August 1971 – 31 May 2018
- Constituency: PP-122 Karachi Central-I

Personal details
- Born: Karachi, Sindh, Pakistan
- Party: MQM-P (2002-present)

Rehan Akram Mirza is a Pakistani politician who has been a Member of the Provincial Assembly of Sindh since 2024.

== Political career ==
He was elected to the 15th Provincial Assembly of Sindh as a candidate of the Muttahida Qaumi Movement – Pakistan from constituency PS-122 Karachi Central-I in the 2018 Pakistani general election.
