= PS-125 Karachi Central-IV =

Constituency of the Provincial Assembly of Sindh, Pakistan

- Constituency for the Provincial Assembly of Sindh
- Region: Gulberg Town (partly) of Karachi Central District in Karachi
- Electorate: 299,730

Current constituency
- Member: Vacant
- Created from: PS-105 Karachi-XVII (2002–2018); PS-125 Karachi Central-III (2018–2023)

PS-125 Karachi Central-IV (پی ایس-125، کراچی وسطی-4) is a constituency of the Provincial Assembly of Sindh.

== General elections 2024 ==
Provincial election 2024: PS-125 Karachi Central-IV
Party	Candidate	Votes	%	±%
MQM-P	Syed Adil Askari	63,812	37.65	
JI	Muhammad Farooq Naimatullah	49,943	29.47	
PTI	Fauzia Siddiqui (Note: Filed nomination papers as PTI candidate but ECP allowed him to run as an Independent)	39,554	23.34	
Independent	Suniya Asif	4,860	2.87	
PPP	Syed Muhammad Naqi	3,441	2.03	
TLP	Tahir Ali Zuberi	2,008	1.19	
Others	Others (thirty candidates)	5,877	3.45	
Turnout		169,909	63.36	
Total valid votes		169,495	99.76	
Rejected ballots		414	0.24	
Majority		13,869	8.18	
Registered electors		268,186		
MQM-P gain from JI				

== General elections 2018 ==
Provincial election 2018: PS-125 Karachi Central-III
Party	Candidate	Votes	%	±%
PTI	Syed Muhammad Abbas Jafri	30,687	30.84	
MQM-P	Abdul Haseeb	26,818	26.95	
MMA	Abdul Baqi	15,853	15.93	
TLP	Muhammad Iqbal	13,240	13.30	
PSP	Syed Anwar Raza Naqvi	6,574	6.61	
PPP	Muhammad Idrees	2,162	2.17	
Independent	Zain Ul Abideen	1,494	1.50	
APML	Syed Umair Uddin	934	0.94	
MWM	Meer Taqi Ali	532	0.53	
Independent	Kishwar Zehra	310	0.31	
Independent	Syed Rashid Rizvi	296	0.30	
MQM-H	Muhammad Shahid	258	0.26	
Independent	Sheikh Jawaid Mehboob	188	0.19	
Independent	Muhammad Ateeq Qureshi	58	0.06	
Independent	Muhammad Anzar Siddiq	48	0.05	
Independent	Anwer Hussain	37	0.04	
Jamiat Ulema-e-Pakistan	Mehnaz Kanwal	29	0.03	
Majority		3,869	3.89	
Valid ballots		99,518		
Rejected ballots		1,579		
Turnout		101,097		
Registered electors		250,011		
hold				

== General elections 2013 ==
Contesting candidates	Party affiliation	Votes polled

== General elections 2008 ==
Contesting candidates	Party affiliation	Votes polled

== See also ==
- PS-124 Karachi Central-III
- PS-126 Karachi Central-V
