= Haleem Adil Sheikh =

Pakistani politician

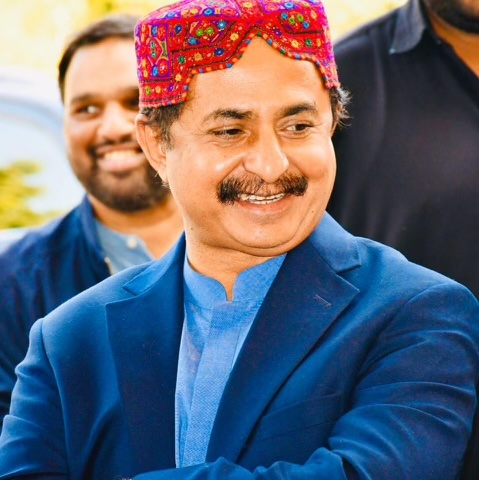

Leader of the Opposition Provincial Assembly of Sindh
- In office 26 January 2021 – 26 July 2023
- Preceded by: Firdous Shamim Naqvi
- Succeeded by: Rana Ansar

President of PTI, Sindh
- Incumbent
- Assumed office 2 June 2023
- Chairman: Imran Khan; Gohar Ali Khan
- Preceded by: Ali Haider Zaidi
- In office 21 July 2019 – 23 December 2022
- Chairman: Imran Khan
- Succeeded by: Ali Haider Zaidi

Member of the Provincial Assembly of Sindh
- In office 13 August 2018 – 11 August 2023
- Constituency: PS-99 (Karachi East-I)

Personal details
- Born: Karachi, Sindh, Pakistan
- Party: PTI (2015–present)
- Other political affiliations: PML(Q) (2005–2015)
- Spouse: Dua Bhutto (m. 2018)

Haleem Adil Sheikh (Urdu: حلیم عادل شیخ; born 22 February 1966) is a Pakistani politician who had been a member of the Provincial Assembly of Sindh from August 2018 to August 2023, and had served as Leader of the Opposition of the Provincial Assembly of Sindh from January 2021 to July 2023. Sheikh served as the parliamentary leader of the Pakistan Tehreek-e-Insaf (PTI) in Provincial Assembly of Sindh from August 2018 to January 2021, and is currently the President of PTI for Sindh.

== Political career ==
Sheikh was elected to the Provincial Assembly of Sindh as a candidate of Pakistan Tehreek-e-Insaf from constituency PS-99 (Karachi East-I) in the 2018 Sindh provincial election.

In January 2021, he was appointed as leader of Opposition of Sindh Assembly. His house was raided by the Sindh Police on 16 May 2022. On 26 July, Sheikh was removed as the Opposition Leader of Provincial Assembly of Sindh. Sheikh was arrested on 25 August 2022 by the Anti-Encroachment Force (AEF) in connection with a land-grabbing case. The AEF produced him in the court of Malir’s judicial magistrate. He was released from jail on 9 September 2022 after a court accepted his bail plea. On 2 June 2023, he was appointed as the President of PTI's Sindh chapter by Imran Khan, the chairman of the PTI.

On 30 August 2023, Haleem Adil Sheikh was arrested from outside the court building and Police bundled him off to an undisclosed location. On 31 January 2024, his release from jail was ordered by the Karachi city court after he was discharged in a case related to the May 9 riots. Following this, on 16 February 2024, he was released from his imprisonment on bail.

He ran from the National Assembly seat NA-238 Karachi East-IV in the 2024 Pakistani general election but officially lost the seat to Sadiq Iftikhar, a candidate of the Muttahida Qaumi Movement – Pakistan (MQM-P). Following this, he and PTI have claimed that the seat was rigged using Form 47s. Sheikh stated that the fact that PTI won more votes on Form 45s was evidence of the party's election victory.

Sheikh and PTI challenged 20 National Assembly seats in Karachi and two in Hyderabad, claiming that PTI had won them instead of the MQM-P. Sheikh also forwarded claims that 38 Sindh Assembly seats were rigged. He stated that PTI collected Form 45s and proof that 22 National Assembly seats including his own, NA-238 Karachi East-IV were rigged in favor of MQM-P. He has moved to challenge the election results of his constituency in the Sindh High Court.

== Views ==
Sheikh has been a staunch critic of the Pakistan People's Party (PPP) and Chief Minister Murad Ali Shah. He stated in June 2024 that Sindh had not seen any proper development for 15 years under the PPP provincial government. Sheikh has stated that billions of rupees were allocated in budgets but they did not result in any development in the province. Sheikh has primarily criticized the education department of Murad Ali Shah for widespread closures of schools in the province and scandals in budgeting. He has also been a staunch critic of the Muttahida Qaumi Movement – Pakistan and has been a leading figure in alleging the 2024 Pakistani general elections were rigged. Sheikh has also affirmed support for Imran Khan.

== See also ==
- List of members of the 15th Provincial Assembly of Sindh
- No-confidence motion against Imran Khan
