= Faisal Rafiq =

Pakistani politician

Member of the Provincial Assembly of Sindh
- In office April 2016 – 28 May 2018

Personal details
- Born: 5 June 1975 (age 50) Karachi, Sindh, Pakistan
- Party: MQM-P (2018-present)
- Other political affiliations: MQM-L (2013-2018)

Faisal Rafiq is a Pakistani politician who had been a Member of the Provincial Assembly of Sindh, from April 2016 to May 2018.

== Early life and education ==
He was born on 5 June 1975 in Karachi.

He has a Bachelor of Commerce degree from Karachi University.

== Political career ==
He was elected to the Provincial Assembly of Sindh as a candidate of Mutahida Quami Movement from Constituency PS-115 Karachi-XXVII in by-polls held in April 2016.
