= Mehmood Alam Jamot =

Pakistani politician

Member of the Provincial Assembly of Sindh
- Incumbent
- Assumed office 25 February 2024
- Constituency: PS-87 Karachi Malir-IV
- In office 13 August 2018 – 11 August 2023
- Constituency: PS-91 Karachi Malir-V

Personal details
- Party: PPP (2018-present)

Mehmood Alam Jamot is a Pakistani politician who is member of the Provincial Assembly of Sindh.

== Political career ==
He was also elected to the Provincial Assembly of Sindh as a candidate of Pakistan Peoples Party from Constituency PS-91 Karachi Malir-V in the 2018 Pakistani general election.
