= PS-88 Karachi Malir-V =

Constituency of the Provincial Assembly of Sindh, Pakistan

- Constituency for the Provincial Assembly of Sindh
- Region: Ibrahim Hyderi town (partly) of Malir District in Karachi
- Electorate: 159,743

Current constituency
- Member: Ajaz Khan Swati
- Created from: PS-128 Karachi-XL (2002–2018); PS-90 Karachi Malir-IV (2018–2023)

PS-88 Karachi Malir-V (پی ایس-88، کراچی ملير-5) is a constituency of the Provincial Assembly of Sindh.

== General elections 2024 ==
Provincial election 2024: PS-88 Karachi Malir-V
Party	Candidate	Votes	%	±%
PPP	Ajaz Khan Swati	17,680	29.60	
PTI	Syed Muzammil Shah (Note: Filed nomination papers to PTI candidate but ECP allowed him to run as an independent)	4,636	21.67	
PML(N)	Muhammad Firoz	7,331	12.27	
JI	Muhammad Nawaz	5,427	9.09	
JUI (F)	Khursheed Ali	4,106	6.87	
Independent	Nazim Uddin Baloch	3,271	5.48	
TLP	Saleem Khan Ghouri	1,751	2.93	
PRHP	Mohai Uddin Shah	1,656	2.77	
Independent	Aijaz Ahmed	1,185	1.98	
ANP	Siraj Ahmed	1,009	1.69	
Independent	Dost Muhammad Khan	994	1.66	
Independent	Arshad	724	1.21	
Others	Others (nine candidates)	1,654	2.78	
Turnout		61,124	38.26	
Total valid votes		59,728	97.72	
Rejected ballots		1,396	2.28	
Majority		4,740	7.93	
Registered electors		159,743		
Independent gain from PPP				

== General elections 2018 ==
Provincial election 2018: PS-90 Malir-IV
Party	Candidate	Votes	%	±%
PPP	Abdul Razzaq Raja	16,313	31.11	
PML(N)	Shahid Iqbal Arain	9,371	17.87	
PTI	Ajaz Khan	8,581	16.36	
MQM-P	Muhammad Pervez	7,175	13.68	
MMA	Ahsanullah	3,445	6.57	
TLP	Muhammad Afzal	3,313	6.32	
AAT	Imran	914	1.74	
PST	Muhammad Hanif	693	1.32	
PSP	Shujat Ali	602	1.15	
PRHP	Muhammad Umer	597	1.14	
ANP	Noor Nawaz Khan	426	0.81	
Independent	Aftab Bakhsh	239	0.46	
Independent	Muhammad Yaqoob	150	0.29	
GDA	Arz Muhammad Rahoujo	139	0.27	
Independent	Shahid Hussain	96	0.18	
Independent	Allah Wadhya	67	0.13	
Independent	Sajida Shabeer	66	0.13	
Independent	Zunaira Rehman	62	0.12	
Independent	Akhtar Yousaf Arfani	56	0.11	
Independent	Irshad Ali	36	0.07	
Independent	Riaz Malik	33	0.06	
Independent	Arshad	20	0.04	
Independent	Jahan Shah Pirzada	19	0.04	
Independent	Saddam Tufail	11	0.02	
Independent	Zeeshan Mustafa	10	0.02	
Independent	Shoaib Khan	8	0.02	
Majority		6,942	13.24	
Valid ballots		52,442		
Rejected ballots		1,104		
Turnout		53,546		
Registered electors		118,496		
hold				

== General elections 2013 ==
Contesting candidates	Party affiliation	Votes polled

== General elections 2008 ==
Contesting candidates	Party affiliation	Votes polled

== See also ==
- PS-87 Karachi Malir-IV
- PS-89 Karachi Malir-VI
