= PS-95 Karachi Korangi-VI =

Constituency of the Provincial Assembly of Sindh, Pakistan

- Constituency for the Provincial Assembly of Sindh
- Region: Korangi Town (partly), Clifton Cantonment (partly) and Korangi Creek Cantonment (partly) of Korangi District in Karachi

Current constituency
- Seats: 1
- Party: Vacant
- Member: Vacant
- Created from: PS-124 Karachi-XXXVI (2002-2018); PS-97 Karachi Korangi-VI (2018-2023)

PS-95 Karachi Korangi-VI (پی ایس-95، کراچی کورنگی-6) is a constituency of the Provincial Assembly of Sindh.

== General elections 2024 ==
Provincial election 2024: PS-95 Karachi Korangi-VI
Party	Candidate	Votes	%	±%
PPP	Muhammad Farooq Awan	16,386	32.78	
PTI	Raja Azhar Khan (Note: Filed nomination papers as PTI candidate but ECP allowed him to run as an Independent)	11,027	22.06	
JI	Mansoor Feroz	7,118	14.24	
MQM-P	Shamshad Khan	4,045	8.09	
PML(N)	Muhammad Ehsan	3,326	6.65	
Independent	Muhammad Atif Khan	2,748	5.50	
TLP	Muhammad Hassan	2,001	4.00	
PRHP	Muhammad Younus	1,462	2.93	
Others	Others (twenty four candidates)	1,873	3.75	
Turnout		51,146	38.95	
Total valid votes		49,986	97.73	
Rejected ballots		1,160	2.27	
Majority		5,359	10.72	
Registered electors		131,329		
PPP gain from PTI				

== General elections 2018 ==
Provincial election 2018: PS-97 Karachi Korangi-VI
Party	Candidate	Votes	%	±%
PTI	Raja Azhar Khan	10,473	22.37	
MQM-P	Waqar Hussain Shah	9,395	20.07	
PML(N)	Nasrat Ullah	9,262	19.78	
TLP	Syed Ghayas Ahmad Hashmi	4,910	10.49	
MMA	Mansoor Feroz	4,241	9.06	
PPP	Muhammad Naeem	3,877	8.28	
Independent	Abdul Hafiz	1,837	3.92	
PSP	Muhammad Saad Siddiqui	1,691	3.61	
APML	Hazar Khan Abro	341	0.73	
PMA	Molana Bashir Ahmad	241	0.51	
GDA	Mohammad Ahmad Khan	180	0.38	
Independent	Rehan Mansoor	101	0.22	
MQM-H	Muhammad Rizwan	67	0.14	
Independent	Imran Bukhari	61	0.13	
ANP	Shakeel Ahmad	53	0.11	
Independent	Maqbool Ahmad	45	0.1	
Independent	Aamir Rafique Khan	23	0.05	
Independent	Abdul Azeem Khan	15	0.03	
Independent	Mian Muhammad Ilyas Rasheed	3	0.01	
Majority		1,078	2.30	
Valid ballots		46,816		
Rejected ballots		845		
Turnout		47,661		
Registered electors		129,301		
hold				

== General elections 2013 ==
General election 2013: PS-124 (Karachi-XXXVI)
Party	Candidate	Votes	%	±%
MQM	Sardar Ahmad	96,500		
PTI	Raja Azhar Khan	7008		
PML(N)	Mian Muhammad Ilyas Rasheed	3608		
PPP	Shah Jahan Sheikh	1098		
PML-SB	Mammad Asghar Dar	193		
AML	Sehrish Anjum Ghouri	859		
Jamiat Ulema-e-Pakistan	Muhammad Saeed Ramzan Qadri	185		
Independent	Muhammad Sharif	125		
PMA	Mian Hussain Saeed	118		
Total valid votes		110457	62.64	
Rejected ballots		1347		
Registered electors		178,471		

== General elections 2008 ==
Contesting candidates	Party affiliation	Votes polled

== See also ==
- PS-94 Karachi Korangi-V
- PS-96 Karachi Korangi-VII
