= Burhan Chandio =

Pakistani politician

Member of the Provincial Assembly of Sindh
- In office 13 August 2018 – 11 August 2023
- Constituency: PS-17 Qambar Shahdadkot-IV

Personal details
- Party: PPP (2018-present)
- Relations: Nawab Ghaibi Sardar Khan Chandio (brother)

Burhan Chandio is a Pakistani politician who had been a member of the Provincial Assembly of Sindh from August 2018 till August 2023.

== Political career ==
He was elected to the Provincial Assembly of Sindh as a candidate of the Pakistan Peoples Party from PS-17 Qambar Shahdadkot-IV in the 2018 Sindh provincial election.
