= Pasban-e-Pakistan =

Pasban Pakistan پاسبانِ پاکستان
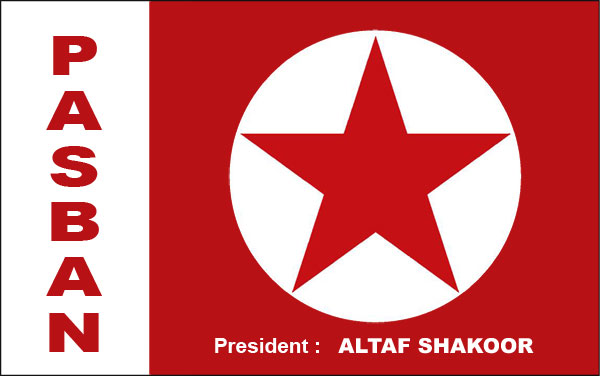
- President: Altaf Shakoor
- Founder: Altaf Shakoor
- Founded: 1995
- Registered: 2013
- Split from: Jamaat-e-Islami Pakistan
- Headquarters: Karachi
- Ideology: Social democracy Social justice
- Colors: White and Red
- Slogan: Voice Against Injustice

Election symbol
- Balloons

The Pasban-e-Pakistan (Urdu: پاسبانِ پاکستان lit. Defenders of Pakistan) also known as Pasban Democratic Party is a political party in Pakistan. It raises its voice against issues of injustice in society. Pasban's current president and founder is Altaf Shakoor. Pasban was initially a youth wing of Jamaat-e-Islami in Pakistan. In 1995, Pasban split from Jaamat-e-Islami and was founded by Altaf Shakoor as a separate splinter group. It registered itself as a political party in 2013. Now it is an independent organisation working for human rights and highlights the problems faced by the common men.
