= NA-204 Khairpur-III =

Constituency of the National Assembly of Pakistan

- Constituency for the National Assembly of Pakistan
- Region: Gambat and Kingri Tehsils and Sobho Dero Tehsil (partly) of Khairpur District
- Electorate: 495,476

Current constituency
- Party: Pakistan People's Party
- Member: Syed Javed Ali Shah Jillani
- Created from: NA-217 Khairpur-III

NA-204 Khairpur-III (این اے-204، خيرپُور-3) is a parliamentary constituency for the National Assembly of Pakistan located in the Khairpur District of Sindh. The constituency includes the areas of Gambat, Kingri Tehsil, and a portion of Sobho Dero Tehsil.

Historically, NA-204 Khairpur-III has witnessed competitive elections with varying results. The constituency has been represented by different political parties over the years, with the Pakistan People's Party (PPP) holding the seat in recent elections. In the 2024 general elections, Syed Javed Ali Shah Jillani of PPP won the seat with 113,022 votes, securing 54.49% of the vote share, demonstrating a notable increase in support for his party.

In the past, the constituency has also been represented by Syed Fazal Ali Shah Jillani, who won in 2002 and 2008. The seat has been a battleground for several key political parties.

== Assembly Segments ==
Constituency number	Constituency	District	Current MPA	Party
30	PS-30 Khairpur-V	Khairpur District	Naeem Ahmed Kharal	PPP
31	PS-31 Khairpur-VI	Khairpur District	Muhammad Rashid Shah	GDA

== Election 2002 ==
General elections were held on 10 October 2002. Syed Fazal Ali Shah Jillani of PPP won by 54,388 votes.

General election 2002: NA-217 Khairpur-III
Party	Candidate	Votes	%	±%
PPP	Pir Syed Fazal Ali Shah Jillani	54,388	50.67	
PML(F)	Syed Moharram Ali Shah	47,308	44.08	
PAT	Nadeem Ahmed Hashmi	2,512	2.34	
Independent	Pir Syed Ahmed Raza Shah Jeelani	2,230	2.08	
Others	Others (three candidates)	892	0.83	
Turnout		110,740	38.08	
Total valid votes		107,330	96.92	
Rejected ballots		3,410	3.08	
Majority		7,080	6.59	
Registered electors		290,832		

== Election 2008 ==
General elections were held on 18 February 2008. Syed Fazal Ali Shah Jillani of PPP won by 77,125 votes.

General election 2008: NA-217 Khairpur-III
Party	Candidate	Votes	%	±%
PPP	Pir Syed Fazal Ali Shah Jillani	77,125	57.96	
PML(F)	Syed Qazim Ali Shah	51,183	38.47	
Others	Others (eight candidates)	4,757	3.57	
Turnout		138,012	39.45	
Total valid votes		133,065	96.42	
Rejected ballots		4,947	3.58	
Majority		25,942	19.49	
Registered electors		349,827		
PPP hold				

== Election 2013 ==
General elections were held on 11 May 2013. Syed Kazim Ali Shah of PML-F won by 75,862 votes and became the member of National Assembly.

General election 2013: NA-217 Khairpur-III
Party	Candidate	Votes	%	±%
PML(F)	Syed Qazim Ali Shah	75,862	46.76	
PPP	Syed Javed Ali Shah Jillani	71,916	44.33	
Others	Others (twenty four candidates)	14,446	8.91	
Turnout		168,151	60.63	
Total valid votes		162,224	96.48	
Rejected ballots		5,927	3.52	
Majority		3,946	2.43	
Registered electors		277,325		
PML(F) gain from PPP				

== Election 2018 ==
General elections were held on 25 July 2018.

General election 2018: NA-210 Khairpur-III
Party	Candidate	Votes	%	±%
PPP	Syed Javed Ali Shah Jillani	90,830	49.73	
GDA	Syed Kazim Ali Shah	78,606	43.04	
Independent	Syed Muharram Ali Shah	3,257	1.78	
MMA	Muhammad Ramzan	2,158	1.18	
Independent	Lal Bux Sial	2,104	1.15	
Pakistan Rah-e-Haq Party	Mukhtiar Hussain Narejo	1,814	0.99	
Independent	Javed Sikander	1,131	0.62	
Independent	Naimatullah Maitlo	964	0.53	
Independent	Syed Fahad Ali Shah Jillani	579	0.32	
Independent	Mahreen Razzaq Bhutto	480	0.26	
Independent	Himat Ali Budh	468	0.26	
Independent	Inayatullah Shaikh	252	0.14	
Turnout		193,049	50.26	
Total valid votes		182,643	94.61	
Rejected ballots		10,406	5.39	
Majority		12,224	6.69	
Registered electors		384,066		
PPP gain from PML(F)				

== Election 2024 ==
Elections were held on 8 February 2024. Syed Javed Ali Shah Jillani won the election with 113,022 votes.

General election 2024: NA-204 Khairpur-III
Party	Candidate	Votes	%	±%
PPP	Syed Javed Ali Shah Jillani	113,022	54.49	▲4.76
GDA	Moazzam Ali Khan	87,501	42.18	▼0.86
Others	Others (eleven candidates)	6,905	3.33	
Turnout		215,614	43.52	▼6.74
Total valid votes		207,428	96.20	
Rejected ballots		8,186	3.80	
Majority		25,521	12.30	▲5.61
Registered electors		495,476		
PPP hold				

== See also ==
- NA-203 Khairpur-II
- NA-205 Naushahro Feroze-I
