= NA-203 Khairpur-II =

Constituency of the National Assembly of Pakistan

- Constituency for the National Assembly of Pakistan
- Region: Thari Mirwah Tehsil, Faiz Ganj, Nara Tehsils and Sobho Dero Tehsil (party) including Ranipur town of Khairpur District
- Electorate: 426,030

Current constituency
- Party: Pakistan People's Party
- Member: Fazal Ali Shah
- Created from: NA-216 Khairpur-II

NA-203 Khairpur-II (این اے-203، خيرپُور-2) is a parliamentary constituency for the National Assembly of Pakistan located in the Khairpur District of Sindh. It encompasses the Thari Mirwah, Faiz Ganj, Nara Tehsil, and Sobho Dero Tehsil, including the town of Ranipur. The constituency is currently represented by Fazal Ali Shah of the Pakistan People's Party, who won the seat in the 2024 general elections with 128,830 votes, marking a significant victory with a majority of 30,594 votes.

The constituency's electorate comprises 426,030 registered voters. Over the years, it has seen representation from various political parties, with the Pakistan People's Party holding the seat in the latest election, reflecting its ongoing influence in the region.

== Assembly Segments ==
Constituency number	Constituency	District	Current MPA	Party
28	PS-28 Khairpur-III	Khairpur District	Sajid Ali Banbhan	PPP
29	PS-29 Khairpur-IV	Khairpur District	Shiraz Shaukat Rajpar	PPP

== Election 2002 ==
General elections were held on 10 October 2002. Pir Sadaruddin Shah of PML-F won by 63,520 votes.

General election 2002: NA-216 Khairpur-II
Party	Candidate	Votes	%	±%
PML(F)	Pir Syed Saddaruddin Shah Rashdi	63,520	51.23	
PPP	Syed Javed Ali Shah	58,735	47.38	
Others	Others (four candidates)	1,724	1.39	
Turnout		126,435	41.95	
Total valid votes		123,979	98.06	
Rejected ballots		2,456	1.94	
Majority		4,785	3.85	
Registered electors		301,400		

== By-election 2003 ==
By-election 2003: NA-216 Khairpur-II
Party	Candidate	Votes	%	±%
PML(F)	Syed Javed Ali Shah	128,785	95.79	
PPP	Pir Syed Ahmad Raza Shah Jilani	4,552	3.39	
Others	Others (eight candidates)	1,110	0.82	
Turnout		136,031	50.13	
Total valid votes		134,447	98.84	
Rejected ballots		1,584	1.16	
Majority		124,233	92.40	
Registered electors		271,364		

== Election 2008 ==
General elections were held on 18 February 2008. Pir Sadaruddin Shah of PML-F won by 97,347 votes.

General election 2008: NA-216 Khairpur-II
Party	Candidate	Votes	%	±%
PML(F)	Pir Syed Saddaruddin Shah Rashdi	97,347	54.74	
PPP	Sajid Ali Banbhan	79,033	44.44	
Others	Others (eleven candidates)	1,453	0.82	
Turnout		182,456	47.50	
Total valid votes		177,833	97.47	
Rejected ballots		4,623	2.53	
Majority		18,314	10.30	
Registered electors		384,093		
PML(F) hold				

== Election 2013 ==
General elections were held on 11 May 2013. Pir Sadaruddin Shah of PML-F won by 86,982 votes and became the member of National Assembly. Whereas, Sajid Ali Banbhan was opponent candidate .

General election 2013: NA-216 Khairpur-II
Party	Candidate	Votes	%	±%
PML(F)	Pir Syed Saddaruddin Shah Rashdi	86,982	50.46	
PPP	Sajid Ali Banbhan	76,941	44.64	
Others	Others (twenty three candidates)	8,449	4.90	
Turnout		177,543	64.32	
Total valid votes		172,372	97.09	
Rejected ballots		5,171	2.91	
Majority		10,041	5.82	
Registered electors		276,049		
PML(F) hold				

== Election 2018 ==
General elections were held on 25 July 2018.

General election 2018: NA-209 Khairpur-II
Party	Candidate	Votes	%	±%
PPP	Fazal Ali Shah	95,972	54.04	
GDA	Pir Sadaruddin Shah	76,073	42.83	
TLP	Syed Ameer Umar Jeelani	1,904	1.07	
Independent	Ismail Shah	1,171	0.66	
MMA	Abdul Haq	1,090	0.61	
Independent	Ghulam Ali	741	0.42	
SUP	Ghulam Mustafa	466	0.26	
Independent	Munwar Ali Wassan	182	0.10	
Turnout		187,448	55.98	
Total valid votes		177,599	94.75	
Rejected ballots		9,849	5.25	
Majority		19,899	11.20	
Registered electors		334,825		
PPP gain from PML(F)				

== Election 2024 ==
Elections were held on 8 February 2024. Fazal Ali Shah won the election with 128,830 votes.

General election 2024: NA-203 Khairpur-II
Party	Candidate	Votes	%	±%
PPP	Fazal Ali Shah	128,830	54.89	▲0.85
GDA	Pir Sadaruddin Shah	98,236	41.85	▼0.98
Others	Others (twelve candidates)	7,661	3.26	
Turnout		243,058	57.05	▲1.07
Total valid votes		234,727	96.57	
Rejected ballots		8,331	3.43	
Majority		30,594	13.03	▲1.83
Registered electors		426,030		
PPP hold				

== See also ==
- NA-202 Khairpur-I
- NA-204 Khairpur-III
