= Syed Javed Ali Shah Jillani =

Pakistani politician

- سید جاوید علی شاہ جیلانی

Member of the National Assembly of Pakistan
- Incumbent
- Assumed office 29 February 2024
- Constituency: NA-204 Khairpur-III
- In office 13 August 2018 – 10 August 2023
- Constituency: NA-210 (Khairpur-III)
- In office 2003 – 18 November 2007
- Constituency: NA-216 Khairpur-II

Personal details
- Party: PPP (2010-present)
- Other political affiliations: PML(F) (2003-2010)

Syed Javed Ali Shah Jillani is a Pakistani politician who has been a member of the National Assembly of Pakistan since February 2024 and previously served in this position from August 2018 till August 2023 and from 2003 to 2007.

== Early life and education ==
He was born on 8 May 1948, in Khairpur Mir's, Pakistan.

He received a degree of Bachelor of Arts (Hons) in 1970 and Masters in Political Science in 1971, both from the University of Sindh.

== Political career ==
He ran for the seat of the National Assembly of Pakistan as a candidate of Pakistan Peoples Party (PPP) from Constituency NA-216 (Khairpur-II) in the 2002 Pakistani general election but was unsuccessful. He received 58,735 votes and lost the seat to Pir Sadaruddin Shah, a candidate of Pakistan Muslim League (F) (PML(F)). In the same election, he ran for the seat of the Provincial Assembly of Sindh as an independent candidate from Constituency PS-29 (Khairpur-I) but was unsuccessful. He received 19 votes and lost the seat to Syed Qaim Ali Shah.

He was elected to the National Assembly as a candidate of PML(F) from Constituency NA-216 (Khairpur-II) in a by-election held in January 2003. He received 128,783 votes and defeated Syed Ahmed Raza Shah Jeelani, a candidate of PPP.

He ran for the seat of the National Assembly as a candidate of PML(F) from Constituency NA-215 (Khairpur-I) in the 2008 Pakistani general election but was unsuccessful. He received 34,014 votes and lost the seat to Nawab Ali Wassan, a candidate of PPP.

On 26 December 2010, he re-joined PPP.

He ran for the seat of the National Assembly as a candidate of PPP from Constituency NA-217 (Khairpur-III) in the 2013 Pakistani general election but was unsuccessful. He received 71,916 votes and lost the seat to Syed Kazim Ali Shah, a candidate of PML(F).

He was re-elected to the National Assembly from NA-210 (Khairpur-III) as a candidate of PPP in the 2018 Pakistani general election. He received 90,830 votes and defeated Syed Kazim Ali Shah, a candidate of the Grand Democratic Alliance (GDA).

He was re-elected to the National Assembly from NA-204 Khairpur-III as a candidate of PPP in the 2024 Pakistani general election. He received 113,022 votes and defeated Mozzam Ali Khan, a candidate of the GDA.
