= PS-32 Khairpur-VII =

Former constituency of the Provincial Assembly of Sindh, Pakistan

- Former constituency for the Provincial Assembly of Sindh
- Region: Kingri Tehsil (partly) including Kingri town and Khairpur Tehsil (partly) of Khairpur District

Former constituency
- Abolished: 2023
- Party: GDA
- Member: Muhammad Rashid Shah
- Created from: PS-30 Khairpur-II

PS-32 Khairpur-VII (پی ایس-32، خیرپور-7) was a constituency of the Provincial Assembly of Sindh. After 2023 It was abolished because Khairpur District lost 1 seat after delimitations.

== General elections 2018 ==
Contesting candidates	Party affiliation	Votes polled

== General elections 2013 ==
Contesting candidates	Party affiliation	Votes polled

== General elections 2008 ==
Contesting candidates	Party affiliation	Votes polled

== See also ==
- PS-31 Khairpur-VI
- PS-33 Naushahro Feroze-I
