= Fazal Ali Shah =

Pakistani politician

Pir Syed Fazal Ali Shah Jillani
- پیر سید فضل علی شاہ جیلانی

Member of the National Assembly of Pakistan
- Incumbent
- Assumed office 29 February 2024
- Constituency: NA-203 Khairpur-II
- In office 13 August 2018 – 10 August 2023
- Constituency: NA-209 (Khairpur-II)
- In office 18 March 2008 – 16 March 2013
- Constituency: NA-217 Khairpur-III
- In office 18 November 2002 – 18 November 2007
- Constituency: NA-217 Khairpur-III
- In office 1997–1999
- Constituency: NA-163 Khairpur-cum-Sukkur

Member of the Provincial Assembly of Sindh
- In office 29 May 2013 – 28 May 2018
- Constituency: PS-33 (Khairpur-V)

Personal details
- Born: 1 November 1970 (age 55) Khairpur, Sindh, Pakistan
- Party: PPP (1993-present)

Pir Syed Fazal Ali Shah Jillani is a Pakistani politician, and parliamentarian. He has been a member of the National Assembly of Pakistan since February 2024 and previously served in this position from 1997 to 1999, from November 2002 to November 2007, from March 2008 to March 2013, and from August 2018 till August 2023. He was a member of the Provincial Assembly of Sindh from 2013 to 2018. He was also Federal Minister for Land Commission.

== Political career ==
He was elected to the National Assembly of Pakistan as a candidate of Pakistan People's Party (PPP) from NA-163 Khairpur-cum-Sukkur in the 1997 Pakistani general election. He received 53,498 votes and defeated Pir Sadaruddin Shah, an independent candidate.

He was re-elected to the National Assembly as a candidate of PPP from NA-217 Khairpur-III in the 2002 Pakistani general election. He received 54,388 votes and defeated Syed Moharram Ali Shah, a candidate of Pakistan Muslim League (F) (PML(F)).

He was re-elected to the National Assembly as a candidate of PPP from NA-217 Khairpur-III in the 2008 Pakistani general election. He received 77,125 votes and defeated Syed Kazim Ali Shah Lakyari, a candidate of PML(F).

He was elected to the Provincial Assembly of Sindh as a candidate of Pakistan People's Party (PPP) from PS-33 Khairpur-V in the 2013 Sindh provincial election. He received 41,890 votes and defeated Syed Mashooq Mohiuddin Shah, a candidate of PML(F).

He was re-elected to the National Assembly as a candidate of PPP from NA-209 (Khairpur-II) in the 2018 Pakistani general election. He received 95,972 votes and defeated Pir Sadaruddin Shah, a candidate of the Grand Democratic Alliance (GDA).

He was re-elected to the National Assembly as a candidate of PPP from NA-203 Khairpur-II in the 2024 Pakistani general election. He received 128,830 votes and defeated Pir Sadaruddin Shah, a candidate of the GDA.

== See also ==
- NA-209
- PS-33
