= Syed Kazim Ali Shah =

Pakistani politician

- سید کاظم علی شاہ

Member of Senate of Pakistan
- Incumbent
- Assumed office 9 April 2024
- Constituency: Sindh

Member of the National Assembly of Pakistan
- In office 1 June 2013 – 31 May 2018
- Constituency: NA-204 (Khairpur-III)

Personal details
- Born: December 5, 1969 (age 56) Khairpur, Sindh, Pakistan
- Party: PPP (2023-present)
- Other political affiliations: PML(F) (2001-2023)

Syed Kazim Ali Shah Lakyari (Urdu: سید کاظم علی شاہ لکیاری; born 5 December 1969) is a Pakistani politician and member of Senate of Pakistan since April 2024. He was previously a member of the National Assembly of Pakistan, from June 2013 to May 2018.

== Political career ==
He was elected as a member of Senate of Pakistan as a candidate of Pakistan People's Party to the general seat of Sindh in the March 2024 Pakistani Senate election.

He ran for the seat of the National Assembly of Pakistan as a candidate of Pakistan Muslim League (F) (PML-F) from Constituency NA-217 (Khairpur-III) in the 2008 Pakistani general election but was unsuccessful. He received 51,183 votes and lost the seat to Fazal Ali Shah.

He was elected to the National Assembly as a candidate of PML-F from Constituency NA-217 (Khairpur-III) in the 2013 Pakistani general election. He received 75,862 votes and defeated Syed Javed Ali Shah Jillani.
