= Makhdoom Fakhar Zaman =

Member of the Provincial Assembly of Sindh from Matiari (2024–2029)

- مخدوم فخر زمان

Member of the Provincial Assembly of Sindh
- Incumbent
- Assumed office 25 February 2024
- Constituency: PS-57 Matiari-II

Personal details
- Party: PPP (2024-present)

Makhdoom Fakhar Zaman (Sindhi: مخدوم فخر زمان; Urdu: مخدوم فخر زمان) is a Pakistani politician who is member of the Provincial Assembly of Sindh.

== Political career ==
Zaman won the 2024 Sindh provincial election from PS-57 Matiari-II as a Pakistan People’s Party candidate. He received 52,175 votes while runner up Syed Jalal Shah of Grand Democratic Alliance received 44,873 votes.
