= Pir of Pagaro VII =

Pakistani spiritual leader and politician (1928–2012)

Pir Paggara
- Sindhi: پير پاڳارو
- Pir Pagara, a veteran politician and spiritual leader of the Hur Jamaat.

President of Pakistan Muslim League (F)
- In office 1985 – 10 January 2012
- Preceded by: Position established
- Succeeded by: Pir of Pagaro VIII

Former Member National Assembly of Pakistan

Personal details
- Born: 22 November 1928 Pir Jo Goth, Sindh, British India
- Died: 10 January 2012 (aged 83) London, United Kingdom
- Party: Pakistan Muslim League (F)
- Other political affiliations: Pakistan Muslim League (pre 1980s)
- Children: Pir of Pagaro VIII (son); Pir Sadaruddin Shah (son) Pir Ali gohar shah (son)
- Parent: Pir of Pagaro VI (father)
- Relatives: Yousaf Raza Gilani (cousin-in-law)
- Education: University of Liverpool

Sayyid Shah Mardan Shah-II (Sindhi: سيد شاهه مردان شاهه) widely known as Pir of Pagaro VII (Sindhi: پير پاڳارو, ; 22 November 1928 – 10 January 2012) was the spiritual leader of Hurs and president of political party Pakistan Muslim League (F). He was commonly known in Pakistan as Pir Sahib Pagara and Pir Shaab. He was an influential figure in Pakistani politics and the leader of Hur Force in Pakistan who participated in the Indo-Pakistani War of 1965. He was also a first-class cricketer. He died on 10 January 2012 in London, due to liver infection.

== Personal life ==
Pir Pagara is a title given to the leader of the Muslim Sufi order of Hurs in Sindh province of Pakistan. It comes from the Persian word "Pir" (elder or "saint") and the Sindhi word "Pagaro", which means Chieftain's Turban. The seventh Pir Pagara was Pir Syed Mardan Shah II. He was born in Pir Jo Goth, Sindh in 1928. Pir Pagara spent a major part of his life engaged in Pakistan's politics. His father Pir Sayyid Sibghatullah Shah II was hanged on 20 March 1943 by the colonial government due to his involvement in the Hur Movement.

He was nominated as the first president of the United Muslim League by Mohtarma Fatima Jinnah . He was Chief of Pakistan Muslim League-Functional (PML-F), and spiritual leader of the 'Hur' jamaat. He was an influential, yet controversial, and mostly respected political personality of Pakistan. His predictions on Pakistan's politics were sometimes quoted in the media. He was usually visited by many senior politicians of Pakistan such as Sheikh Rasheed, Chaudhry Shujaat, Raza Haroon and Shah Mehmood Qureshi.

== Cricket ==
Usually referred to in cricket literature as the Pir of Pagaro, he was influential in the early years of Pakistan's cricket development in the 1950s. Before Pakistan's first tour of England in 1954 he had a grass pitch constructed in his garden so that the Pakistan players, who had to play most of their cricket at the time on matting pitches, could practice in something similar to English conditions. He re-founded the Sind Cricket Association, captained Sind in the first-ever match in the Quaid-e-Azam Trophy in November 1953, and organized and captained a team under his name against the MCC in 1955-56.

== Death ==
Pir Pagara was admitted to Aga Khan University Hospital (AKUH) on 24 November 2011, for the treatment of infected lungs. According to doctors, he was in a very serious condition and was therefore put on a ventilator and flown to London on a special air ambulance on 5 January, along with a physician and family members.

He died on 10 January 2012 due to a liver infection, his body was returned to Pakistan on the following day. Many political parties in Pakistan, including the Hurs, sent their condolences to the family. He was buried in his native Pir Jo Goth village alongside his ancestors.

He was succeeded by his son Syed Sibghatullah Shah Rashdi III, known informally as Raja Saeen', both as the Pir Pagara and leader of Pakistan Muslim League (F).

== See also ==
- Sibghatullah Shah Rashidi
- Hurs

Preceded by Sibghatullah Shah Rashidi	Pir Pagara; 1943–2012	Succeeded by Syed Sibghatullah Shah Rashdi III

Preceded by Post Created	Leader of Pakistan Muslim League (F); 1985–2012	Succeeded by Syed Sibghatullah Shah Rashdi III
