= PS-57 Matiari-II =

Constituency of the Provincial Assembly of Sindh, Pakistan

- Constituency for the Provincial Assembly of Sindh
- Region: Matiari Tehsil and Hala Tehsil (partly) of Matiari District
- Electorate: 200,618

Current constituency
- Member: Vacant
- Created from: PS-44 Hyderabad-II (2002-2018); PS-59 Matiari-II (2018-2023)

PS-57 Matiari-II (پی ایس-57، مٹیاری-2) is a constituency of the Provincial Assembly of Sindh.

== General elections 2024 ==
Provincial election 2024: PS-57 Matiari-II
Party	Candidate	Votes	%	±%
PPP	Makhdoom Fakhar Zaman	52,175	51.38	
GDA	Syed Jalal Shah	46,016	45.32	
Others	Others (thirteen candidates)	3,357	3.30	
Turnout		105,923	52.80	
Total valid votes		101,548	95.87	
Rejected ballots		4,375	4.13	
Majority		6,159	6.06	
Registered electors		200,618		
PPP hold				

== General elections 2018 ==
Provincial election 2018: PS-59 Matiari-II
Party	Candidate	Votes	%	±%
PPP	Makhdoom Rafik Zaman	46,334	54.98	
GDA	Syed Jalal Shah	24,377	28.93	
MMA	Sarang Khan Mangwano	7,742	9.19	
Independent	Syed Meer Kazim Shah Hussainy	1,649	1.96	
Independent	Imtiaz Ali	786	0.93	
Independent	Awais Gul Memon	557	0.66	
Independent	Muhammad Siddique Khidri	541	0.64	
Independent	Akhtar Hussain	511	0.61	
PTI	Abdul Razaque Jafrani Khoso	460	0.55	
PML(N)	Nargis Naz	392	0.47	
Independent	Syed Mir Ali Shah	288	0.34	
Independent	Saeed Ahmed	130	0.15	
Independent	Muhammad Saleh Jakhrejo	124	0.15	
Independent	Ali Sher	111	0.13	
Independent	Syed Ali Hussain Shah	99	0.12	
PSP	Altaf Hussain Burdi	85	0.10	
Independent	Nawab Tarique Hussain	84	0.10	
Majority		21,957	26.05	
Valid ballots		84,270		
Rejected ballots		3,614		
Turnout		87,884		
Registered electors		163,858		
hold				

== General elections 2013 ==
Contesting candidates	Party affiliation	Votes polled

== General elections 2008 ==
Contesting candidates	Party affiliation	Votes polled

== See also ==
- PS-56 Matiari-I
- PS-58 Tando Allahyar-I
