= SadarJi Bhatyoon =

SadarJi Bhatyoon صدر جی بہتیون
- City
- SadarJi Bhatyoon
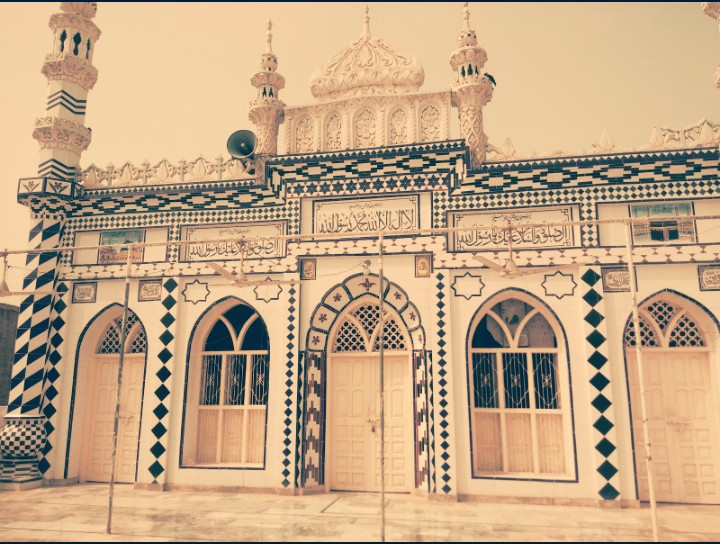

- Location within Sindh
- Coordinates: 27°35′48.307″N 68°32′27.998″E
- Country: Pakistan
- Province: Sindh
- District: Khairpur District

Population (2017)
  - Total: 10,063
- Time zone: UTC+5 (PST)
- Calling code: 0243
- Number of union councils: 1
- Number of U/c of SadarJi Bhatyoon: 16

SadarJi Bhatyoon (Sindhi: صدر جی بہتیون, Urdu: صدر جی بہتیون) is a village in Sindh province of Pakistan.

== Geography ==
It is located approximately 25 kilometers from the city of Khairpur District, and approximately 10 kilometers from the ancient Pir Jo Goth fort.

== History ==
SadarJi Bhatyoon is a monument to a Sindh to sell turbines for 8 years.

There were also many other polling stations between the PTI, PMLF, PPP and other independent constituencies. Meanwhile, SHO Abdul Satar Kalhoro, due to the attack on SadarJi Bhatyoon, polling station, died in the passing of a polling agent of the PTI agent, Hidayatullah Suprio in the polling station.

== Education ==
Government Primary Boys School SadarJi Bhatyon was established in 1990 AD. Government High School Sadarji Bhatyon 1988 AD.[5] Government Girls Primary School, Sadarji Bhatyon Private sector, Shakeel Model Public School, Angles Public School Sadar Ji Bhatyoon, Nova Public School, Sindh education foundation Sadar Ji Bhatyoon.

== See also ==
- Khairpur (princely state)
