= PS-30 Khairpur-V =

Constituency of the Provincial Assembly of Sindh, Pakistan

- Constituency for the Provincial Assembly of Sindh
- Region: Sobho Dero Taluka and Gambat Tehsil (partly) of Khairpur District
- Electorate: 241,877

Current constituency
- Created: 2018
- Member: Vacant
- Created from: PS-34 Khairpur-VI

PS-30 Khairpur-V (پی ایس-30، خیرپور-5) is a constituency of the Provincial Assembly of Sindh.

== By-election 2026 ==
A by-election was held on 16 August 2026 due to the death of Naeem Ahmed Kharal, the previous member from this seat. Asfandyar Khan Kharal of PPP won the election with 48,986 votes.

By-election 2026: PS-30 Khairpur-V
Party	Candidate	Votes	%	±%
PPP	Asfandyar Khan Kharal	48,986	94.59	▲33.74
PTI	Syed Tasawwur Mehdi Hassan Shah	1,299	2.51	
PML(N)	Muhammad Musa Buriro	702	1.36	
JI	Ghulam Ali	408	0.79	▲0.62
IPP	Shah Hassan Kharal	163	0.31	▲0.25
ANP	Syed Fahad Ali Shah Jeelani	102	0.20	
GDA	Raheel Kareem Kharal	79	0.15	
PST	Ghulam Umar	46	0.09	
Turnout		52,355	20.53	▼19.19
Total valid votes		51,785	98.91	
Rejected ballots		570	1.09	
Majority		47,687	92.09	▲59.97
Registered electors		254,980		
PPP hold				

== General elections 2024 ==
Provincial election 2024: PS-30 Khairpur-V
Party	Candidate	Votes	%	±%
PPP	Naeem Ahmed Kharal	57,004	60.85	
GDA	Shaikh Khalid Hussain	26,913	28.73	
Independent	Syed Niaz Hussain Shah Jillani	2,809	3.00	
PTI	Pir Ahmed Ali Shah (Note: Filed nomination papers as PTI candidate but ECP allowed him to run as an Independent)	2,468	2.63	
TLP	Waseem Raza	2,069	2.21	
Others	Others (sixteen candidates)	2,418	2.58	
Turnout		96,081	39.72	
Total valid votes		93,681	97.50	
Rejected ballots		2,400	2.50	
Majority		30,091	32.12	
Registered electors		241,887		

== General elections 2018 ==
Contesting candidates	Party affiliation	Votes polled

== See also ==
- PS-29 Khairpur-IV
- PS-31 Khairpur-VI
