= Muhammad Rashid Shah =

Pakistani politician

Muhammad Rashid Shah Rashdi
- محمد راشد شاھ راشدي

Member of the Provincial Assembly of Sindh
- In office 13 August 2018 – 11 August 2023
- Constituency: PS-32 Khairpur-VII
- In office 29 May 2013 – 28 May 2018

Personal details
- Born: 27 February 1979 (age 47) Kingri Tehsil, Sindh, Pakistan
- Party: GDA (2017-present)

Muhammad Rashid Shah Rashdi (Sindhi: محمد راشد شاھ راشدي) is a Pakistani politician who had been a member of the Provincial Assembly of Sindh, from August 2018 to August 2023 and from May 2013 to May 2018.

== Early life ==
Born on February 27, 1979, in Kingri Tehsil, Sindh, he belongs to the influential Rashdi family and is the son of the spiritual leader Sibghatullah Shah Rashdi (Pir of Pagaro VIII)

== Political career ==
He was elected to the Provincial Assembly of Sindh as a candidate of Pakistan Muslim League (F) from Constituency PS-30 KHAIRPUR-II in the 2013 Pakistani general election.

He was re-elected to Provincial Assembly of Sindh as a candidate of Grand Democratic Alliance (GDA) from Constituency PS-32 (Khairpur-VII) in the 2018 Pakistani general election.
