= PMLF =

PMLF may refer to

- Pakistan Muslim League (F), a Pakistani party formed in 1985
- Partido Marxista–Leninista Fretilin, a name used by the East Timorese party Fretilin between 1981 and 1984
