= PS-28 Khairpur-III =

Constituency of the Provincial Assembly of Sindh, Pakistan

- Constituency for the Provincial Assembly of Sindh
- Region: Thari Mirwah Taluka (partly) and Nara Tehsil (partly) of Khairpur District
- Electorate: 207,136

Current constituency
- Member: Vacant
- Created from: PS-33 Khairpur-V

PS-28 Khairpur-III (پی ایس-28، خیرپور-3) is a constituency of the Provincial Assembly of Sindh. Sajid Ali Banbhan elected as MPA of Thari Mirwah Nara on 2024-8 Feb.

== General elections 2024 ==
Provincial election 2024: PS-28 Khairpur-III
Party	Candidate	Votes	%	±%
PPP	Sajid Ali Banbhan	59,219	51.35	
GDA	Ismail Shah	54,850	47.57	
Others	Others (twenty candidates)	1,247	1.08	
Turnout		118,741	57.33	
Total valid votes		115,316	97.12	
Rejected ballots		3,425	2.88	
Majority		4,369	3.78	
Registered electors		207,136		

== General elections 2018 ==
Contesting candidates	Party affiliation	Votes polled

== General elections 2013 ==
The Following is the list of contesting candidates from the PS-33 for the Provincial Assembly of Sindh. Pir Syed Fazal Ali Shah Jeelani of PPP-P got 41,890 votes and was declared as the successful candidate. However, it was also alleged that rigging was being done.

Contesting candidates	Party affiliation	Votes polled
Zulfiqar Ali Ansari	Independent	6
Asad Ali Shar	ITP	20
Ghulam Shabeer Shar	Independent	12
Imtiaz Ali Mallah	Independent	12
Jam Maqbool Hussain Sahito	Independent	319
Zakir Hussain Solangi	STP	84
Sajid Ali Banbhan	Independent	12
Zulfiqar Ali Soomro	SUP	1
Roshanuddin Jogi	Independent	1238
Qamaruddin Sahito	MQM	584
Himath Ali	PTI	808
Aftab Ahmed Shar	Independent	379
Pir Syed Ahmed Raza Shah Jeelani	Independent	94
Pir Syed Ahmed Nawaz Shah	Independent	679
Razaque Hussain	Independent	74
Dhani Bux Khan Hajano	MWM	1829
Dur Muhammad Khaskhely	JI	261
Asghar Ali Awan	Independent	7
Pir Syed Fazal Ali Shah Jeelani	PPP-P	41890
Doctor Ahmad Ali Kubr	Independent	1024

== General elections 2008 ==
Contesting candidates	Party affiliation	Votes polled

== See also ==
- PS-27 Khairpur-II
- PS-29 Khairpur-IV
