= Hurs =

Sunni Sufi Muslim community in Pakistan

Hurs (Arabic: حر, Sindhi: حر, 'free') are a Sufist community in the province of Sindh, Pakistan who adhere to Sunni Islam. Their current spiritual leader is Pir of Pagaro VIII, who serves as a politician in the Provincial Assembly of Sindh.

== History ==
=== Colonial period ===
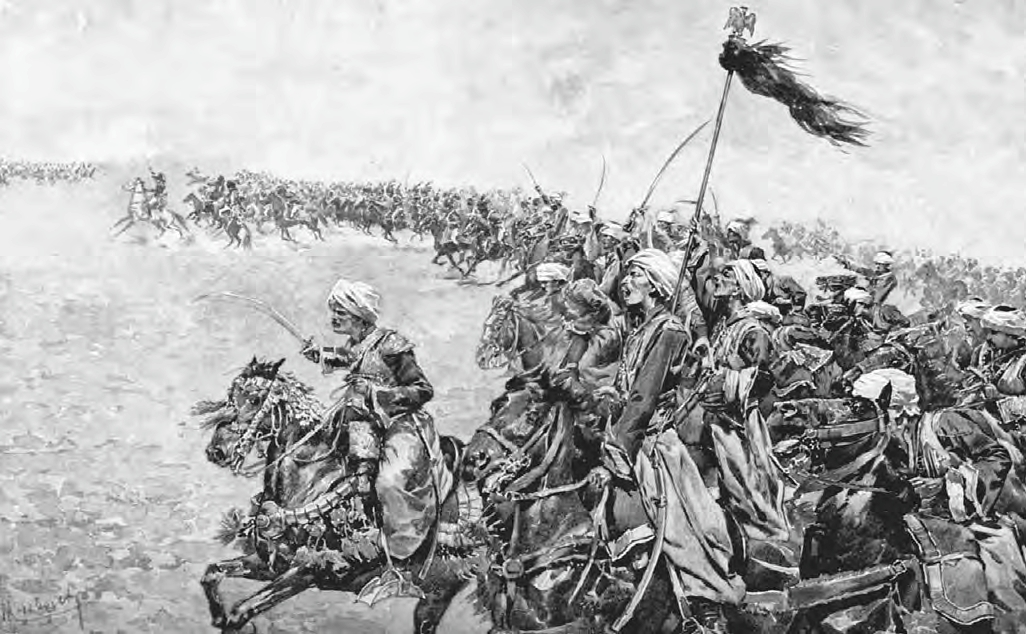
Felician Myrbach's Charge of the Mamluks, cavalry at the Battle of Miani (1843)

During the period of Company rule in India, Sufist religious leader Syed Muhammad Rashid Shah formed a community of Sunni Muslims which rejected any forms of British authority; Shah declared his community as "Hur" (Sindhi: 'free'). His successor, Syed Sibghatullah Shah, declared himself as the first Pir (spiritual leader) of Pagaro. In response to the actions of the Hurs, Commissioner Mohammad Yaqub recommended the application of the 1871 Criminal Tribes Act (CTA) to the group in 1898. Two years later, the CTA was applied to all Hurs, which remained in effect until 1952.

=== Hur insurgency ===
In 1941, Pir of Pagaro VI led the Hurs in an insurgency against British colonial rule. Pagaro's followers attacked police, military and civilian targets, killing dozens. In response, Governor Hugh Dow called for the introduction of martial law to Sindh, which was passed through the Sindh Assembly via the 1942 Hur Suppression Act; martial law remained in effect in Sindh from June 1942 to May 1943. British Indian Army, Indian Imperial Police and Royal Air Force elements were engaged in counterinsurgency operations against the Hurs, arresting several leaders including Pagaro himself. Pagaro was tried in a military court on charges of "conspiring to war against the King-Emperor", found guilty and hanged on 20 March 1943.

The Hurs cannot be said to have been defeated as they continued their campaign even after the hanging of the Pir Sahib, right up to the time of the Independence of Pakistan, Sindh having acquired the status of a province in the newly independent country. Pir Pagaro Sayyed Sibghatullah Shah II was hanged on 20 March 1943 and the British left Pakistan four years later on 14 August 1947.

=== Postcolonial period ===
Long after the independence of Pakistan, Pir Pagaro's two sons, who were in British custody in England, were released and came back to lead their community. Sindh was a province in the newly independent Pakistan. The two sons of Sibghatullah Shah II Shaheed, Pir Syed Shah Mardan Shah Rashidi alais Pir Syed Sikandar Ali Shah Rashidi and Pir Syed Nadir Ali Shah Rashdi were brought to Pakistan in December 1951 after long negotiations. The elder son, Pir Syed Shah Mardan Shah Rashidi - II alais Pir Syed Sikandar Ali Shah Rashdi became the new Pir Pagara (7th Pir Pagaro) on 1 February 1952. Shah Mardan Shah II died on 10 January 2012 in London due to pneumonia. On 12 January 2012, Syed Sibghatullah Shah Rashdi III, commonly known as Raja Saein, was elected as the 8th Pir Pagara at a meeting of the Caliphs of Hur Community.

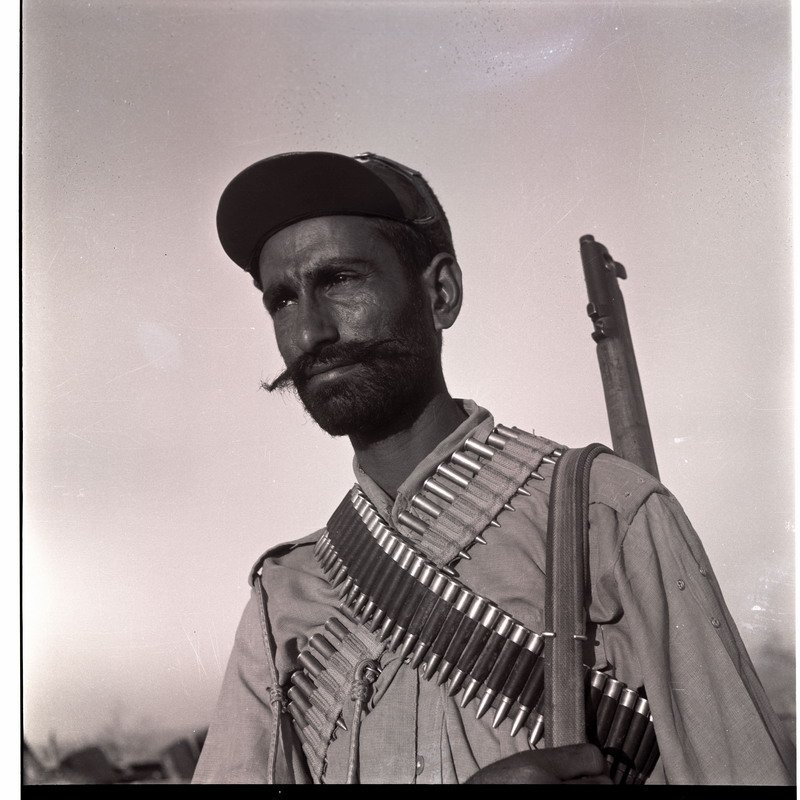
A Hur standing guard during the 1965 war

During the Indo-Pakistani war of 1965, several Hurs enlisted in the Pakistani Armed Forces and fought against Indian forces.

== List of Pirs of the Hur Jamaat ==
Name and Title	Image	Date of birth and Death	Notes
Syed Muhammad Rashid Shah		Died: 1819	Also Known as Rozay Dhani, the forerunner of Pir Pagaras and Jhandaywaras
Syed Sibghatullah Shah I Pir Pagaro I		Died: 1831	First Pir as he got the pagg (turban). His brother Yaseen Shah (Pir Pagaro I's brother) got the Jhanda, 'Alam), died in 1831
Pir Syed Ali Gohar Shah Rashidi I Pir Pagaro II		Died: 1847	Collection of his Poetry Asghar Sain jo Kalam is published by Jamia Rashidia Pir jo Goth
Syed Hizbullah Shah Pir Pagaro III		Died: 1890	
Syed Ali Gohar Shah II Pir Pagaro IV		Died: 1896	
Syed Shah Mardan Shah I Pir Pagaro V		Died: 1921	
Syed Sibghatullah Shah Rashdi II Pir Pagaro VI		Born: 1910 Died: 20 March 1943	Alias Soreh Badshah (سورھيه بادشاھ)
Syed Shah Mardan Shah II Pir Pagaro VII		Born: 22 November 1928 Died: 10 January 2012	Alias Pir Syed Sikandar Ali Shah Rashidi
Sibghatullah Shah Rashdi III Pir Pagaro VIII		Born: 14 February 1956	Also known as Raja Saeen, President of PMLF and Founder of GDA.
