= Asfandyar Khan Kharal =

Pakistani politician

- اسفندیار خان کھرل

Member of the Provincial Assembly of Sindh
- Incumbent
- Assumed office 28 August 2026
- Preceded by: Naeem Ahmed Kharal
- Constituency: PS-30 Khairpur-V

Personal details
- Party: Pakistan People's Party
- Relations: Naeem Ahmed Kharal (uncle)

Asfandyar Khan Kharal (Sindhi: اسفندیار خان کھرل) is a Pakistani politician who has been a member of the Provincial Assembly of Sindh since August 2026.

== Political career ==
Kharal was elected to the Provincial Assembly of Sindh as a candidate of the Pakistan Peoples Party (PPP) from PS-30 Khairpur-V in a 2026 by-election, which was called due to the death of Naeem Ahmed Kharal, his uncle. He received 48,986 votes, defeating Syed Tasawwur Hassan Mehdi, an independent candidate.
