= Safdar Ali Abbasi =

Pakistani politician (born 1957)

Member of Senate of Pakistan
- In office 2020–2012

President of PPP-W
- In office 2018–2024

Personal details
- Born: 26 December 1957 (age 68) Larkana, Sindh, Pakistan
- Party: GDA (2024-present)
- Other political affiliations: PPP-W (2018-2024); PPP (2007-2018)
- Occupation: Politician
- Profession: Physician

Safdar Ali Abbasi (Note: Urdu: صفدر علی عباسی) (born 26 December 1957) is a Pakistani politician who is the current leader of the Pakistan Peoples Party Workers (PPPW) and the general-secretary of the Grand Democratic Alliance (GDA).

== Early life ==
Abbasi was born in Larkana, Pakistan, on 26 December 1957. His family had long been involved in politics. Abbasi's mother, Ashraf Abbasi, was at one time the Deputy Speaker of the National Assembly of Pakistan. Abbasi attended Aitchison College, Lahore, completing Cambridge and Intermediate studies before pursuing a medical degree at Dow Medical College, Karachi. He was interested and involved in local politics during his youth.

== Political career ==
In 2018, Abbasi along with some other PPP leaders announced his own faction named as Pakistan Peoples Party Workers and later became its president.

== Controversies ==
=== Benazir Bhutto's assassination case ===
Safdar Abbasi and his wife, Naheed Khan, faced many problems after Benazir Bhutto's assassination on 27 December 2007, in Liaquat Bagh. Both were considered close to Benazir Bhutto and sidelined under the new leadership of Asif Ali Zardari, along with her other close advisers.

Since Benazir Bhutto's death, many of the party workers who were close to her lost their positions in the Zardari government, including party worker and leader of the Lawyers' Movement in Pakistan Aitezaz Ahsan. Instead, many new figures were introduced to fill these positions.
