= PS-29 Khairpur-IV =

Constituency of the Provincial Assembly of Sindh, Pakistan

- Constituency for the Provincial Assembly of Sindh
- Region: Faizganj Tehsil, Sobho Dero Taluka, Thari Mirwah Taluka (partly) and Nara Tehsil (partly) of Khairpur District
- Electorate: 218,894

Current constituency
- Member: Vacant
- Created from: PS-31 Khairpur-III

PS-29 Khairpur-IV (پی ایس-29، خیرپور-4) is a constituency of the Provincial Assembly of Sindh.

== General elections 2024 ==
Provincial election 2024: PS-29 Khairpur-IV
Party	Candidate	Votes	%	±%
PPP	Shiraz Shaukat Rajper	69,590	58.69	
GDA	Muhammad Rafique Banbhan	45,734	38.57	
Others	Others (eighteen candidates)	3,255	2.74	
Turnout		124,166	56.72	
Total valid votes		118,579	95.50	
Rejected ballots		5,587	4.50	
Majority		23,856	20.12	
Registered electors		218,894		

== General elections 2018 ==
Contesting candidates	Party affiliation	Votes polled

== General elections 2013 ==
Contesting candidates	Party affiliation	Votes polled

== General elections 2008 ==
Contesting candidates	Party affiliation	Votes polled

== See also ==
- PS-28 Khairpur-III
- PS-30 Khairpur-V
