= PS-31 Khairpur-VI =

Constituency of the Provincial Assembly of Sindh, Pakistan

- Constituency for the Provincial Assembly of Sindh
- Region: Gambat and Kingri Tehsils (partly) of Khairpur District
- Electorate: 253,581

Current constituency
- Member: Vacant
- Created from: PS-34 Khairpur-VI

PS-31 Khairpur-VI (پی ایس-31، خیرپور-6) is a constituency of the Provincial Assembly of Sindh.

== General elections 2024 ==
Provincial election 2024: PS-31 Khairpur-VI
Party	Candidate	Votes	%	±%
GDA	Syed Muhammad Rashid Shah	58,091	50.78	
PPP	Muhammad Bachal Shah	51,769	45.26	
Others	Others (thirteen candidates)	4,533	3.96	
Turnout		118,808	46.85	
Total valid votes		114,393	96.28	
Rejected ballots		4,415	3.72	
Majority		6,322	5.52	
Registered electors		253,589		

== General elections 2018 ==
Contesting candidates	Party affiliation	Votes polled

== General elections 2013 ==
Contesting candidates	Party affiliation	Votes polled

== General elections 2008 ==
Contesting candidates	Party affiliation	Votes polled

== See also ==
- PS-30 Khairpur-V
- PS-32 Naushahro Feroze-I
