= Shiraz Shaukat Rajpar =

Member of the Provincial Assembly of Sindh from Khairpur (2024–2029)

- شيراز شوڪت راڄپر

Member of the Provincial Assembly of Sindh
- Incumbent
- Assumed office 25 February 2024
- Constituency: PS-29 Khairpur-IV

Personal details
- Party: PPP (2024-present)

Shiraz Shaukat Rajpar (Sindhi: شيراز شوڪت راڄپر;Urdu: شیراز شوکت راجپر) is a Pakistani politician who is member of the Provincial Assembly of Sindh.

== Political career ==
Rajpar won the 2024 Sindh provincial election from PS-29 Khairpur-IV as a Pakistan People’s Party candidate. He received 69,590 votes while runner up Muhammad Rafiq Banbhan of Grand Democratic Alliance received 45,734 votes.
