= Pir Jo Goth =

City in Sindh Province, Pakistan

Pir Jo Goth پير جو ڳوٺ
- City
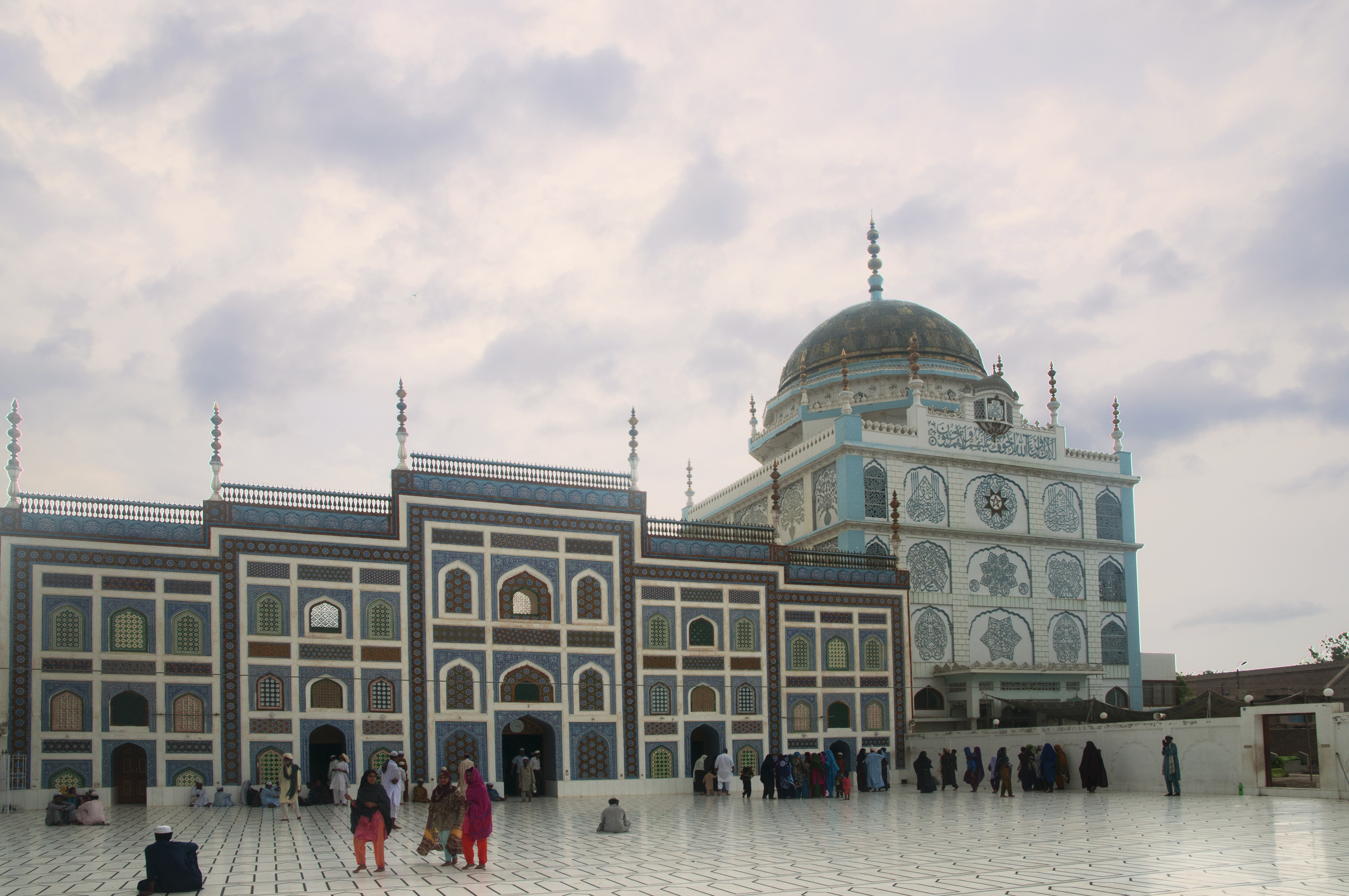

- Location of Pirjo Goth Pir Jo Goth پير جو ڳوٺ (Pakistan) Pir Jo Goth پير جو ڳوٺ (South Asia)
- Coordinates: 27°35′45.413″N 68°36′50.922″E
- Country: Pakistan
- Province: Sindh
- District: Khairpur

Population (2023)
  - Total: 54,266
- Time zone: UTC+5 (PST)
- Calling code: 0243

Pir Jo Goth (Sindhi: پير جو ڳوٺ) also known as Kingri is a city in Pakistan situated in the Kingri Taluka of Khairpur District in the Sindh province. It is the headquarter of Kingri taluka. Its population was 54,266 in 2023.

== History ==
Pir Jo Goth (listed as Kingri (Pirjo Goth) in the 2023 Census) is mainly famous for the tomb of Muhammad Rashid (known as Roz-e-Dhani) and his descendants. Murids of Roz-e-Dahni are now called Hurs and the descendant of Roz-e-Dahani is called Pir Pagaara. Sayed Sibgatullah Shah Rashidi III is the 8th Pir Paghara. The Hurs visit the city four times in a year for Ziyarat of Pir Sahib Pagara and the tomb of Muhammad Rashid (Roz-e-Dhani). Sayed Muhammad Rashid Shah Rashidi is MPA of Pir-jo-goth (From 2013), Sayed Najebullah Shah Rashidi is chairman of Taluka Kingri (from 2015) and Abdul Gafar Memon is city chairman (From 2015). Many schools (government and private) and colleges for both boys and girls are also in city. Government Boys Degree College and Government Girls Degree College provide higher education in city. Jamia Rashidia Islamic University (non-government) for Islamic education and two libraries (one public and the other private) is also in Pir Jo Goth city. And for health one civil hospital and many private hospitals in city. The city has two big bazaars namely Shahi Bazar and Thano Road. Ground and parks for also for citizen in city. And Anaj Mandi, Sabzi Mandi, Goshat Market and Maal Piddi also in Pir-jo-goth city. Pir-jo-Goth is headquarter of Pakistan Muslim League Functional. Dates and bananas are famous fruit of Pir-Jo-Goth.

== Demographics ==
Population

Historical population
Year	Pop.	±%
1972	13,688	—
1981	18,322	+33.9%
1998	30,285	+65.3%
2017	47,518	+56.9%
2023	54,266	+14.2%

According to the 2023 census Pirjo goth town had a population of 54,266.

Languages

Languages of Kingri (Pirjo goth) Town (2023 Census)
1. Sindhi (97.5%)
2. Urdu (2.20%)
3. Others (0.30%)
