= Pir of Pagaro VI =

Spiritual leader of the Hur Movement and Indian independence activist

Shaheed Sibghatullah Shah Al-Rashdi صبغت الله شاهه راشدي ' پير صبغت الله شاه راشدي '
- Born: 1910; Khairpur State, British India
- Died: 20 March 1943 (aged 32–33); Hyderabad, Sind Province
- Organization: Hur Movement
- Title: Soreh Badshah
- Term: 1922–1943
- Predecessor: Pir of Pagaro V
- Successor: Pir of Pagaro VII
- Movement: Indian independence movement

Sayyid Sibghatullah Shah Al-Rashidi II (Sindhi: سيد صبغت الله شاه الراشدي), Pir Pagaro the sixth, was a spiritual leader of the Hurs during the Indian independence movement. Hur (Arabic: حر meaning "free", "not slave") is a Sufi Muslim community in the province of Sindh (located in what is now Pakistan). Sayyid Sibghatullah Shah Al-Rashidi was a champion of Hindu-Muslim unity, initially supporting the Indian National Congress and then the All India Forward Bloc.

Soreh Badshah (شهيد سورهيه بادشاهه) (the Victorious King or the great king) was the title given him by his Followers. He was hanged by the British colonial government on 20 March 1943 in the Central Jail Hyderabad, Sind. His burial place remains unknown, despite requests to the government from people living in Sindh.

== Indian independence movement ==
Sayyid Sibghatullah Shah Al-Rashidi was a close friend of Subhas Chandra Bose and "In the original plan presented to the Axis Powers by Netaji, Pir of Pagaro and Faqir of Ipi were to be armed to liberate India." The Pir of Pagaro preached Hindu-Muslim unity and was a "fierce opponent" of communal politics. To this end, he declared that "only when Hindus and Muslims combined would 'peace ... be achieved and satanic deeds ... stopped': Indians had to be 'national minded' and regard India as a country which belonged to all its inhabitants." When Subhas Chandra Bose was the president of the Indian National Congress, Sayyid Sibghatullah Shah Al-Rashidi "started inviting Congress leadership to his area and organise Hindu-Muslim unity meetings." After the formation of the All India Forward Bloc, the Pir of Pagaro backed this organization. During the falsified controversy about Manzilgah Controversy, the Pir of Pagaro ordered his armed followers, known as ghazis, to save Hindus during the communal rioting.

Preceded by Pir Syed Shah Mardan Shah I	Pir Pagara; 1922–1943	Succeeded by Syed Shah Mardan Shah-II
