= Pir Sadaruddin Shah =

Pakistani politician

Pir Syed Sadaruddin Shah Rashidi

Minister for Overseas Pakistanis and Human Resource Development
- In office 4 August 2017 – 31 May 2018
- President: Mamnoon Hussain
- Prime Minister: Shahid Khaqan Abbasi
- Succeeded by: Sayed Zulfiqar Abbas Bukhari
- In office 7 June 2013 – 28 July 2017
- President: Mamnoon Hussain
- Prime Minister: Nawaz Sharif
- Preceded by: Farooq Sattar

Personal details
- Born: October 21, 1960 (age 65)
- Party: GDA (2025-present)
- Other political affiliations: PML(F)
- Relatives: Syed Shah Mardan Shah (father); Syed Sibghatullah Shah (brother)

Pir Syed Sadaruddin Shah Rashidi (Urdu: پیر سید صدرالدین شاہ راشدی; born 21 October 1960) is a Pakistani politician who served as Minister for Overseas Pakistanis and Human Resource Development, in Abbasi cabinet from August 2017 to May 2018. He previously served as the Minister for Overseas Pakistanis.

== Early life ==
He is the son of the late Syed Shah Mardan Shah II (former Pir Pagaro) and the brother of the current spiritual leader of the Hur community, Syed Sibghatullah Shah Rashdi III.

== Political career ==
Shah was elected as a member of Provincial Assembly of Sindh for the first time in the 2002 Pakistani general election and served as provincial Minister of irrigation and power from 2002 to 2004 and later held the portfolio of Communications and Works from 2004 to 2007 in Sindh Government.

He was elected to the National Assembly of Pakistan in the 2008 Pakistani general election from constituency NA-216.

He was re-elected to the National Assembly of Pakistan in the 2013 Pakistani general election from constituency NA-216 and NA-235 and won both. He later vacated his NA-235 seat and retained NA-216.

In June 2013, he was appointed as Minister for Overseas Pakistanis and Human Resource Development by Prime Minister Nawaz Sharif. He is currently the president of Sindh chapter of his party PML-F.

He had ceased to hold ministerial office in July 2017 when the federal cabinet was disbanded following the resignation of Prime Minister Nawaz Sharif after Panama Papers case decision. Following the election of Shahid Khaqan Abbasi as Prime Minister of Pakistan in August 2017, he was inducted into the federal cabinet of Abbasi. He was appointed as the Federal Minister for Overseas Pakistanis and Human Resource Development.

Upon the dissolution of the National Assembly on the expiration of its term on 31 May 2018, Rashidi ceased to hold the office as Federal Minister for Overseas Pakistanis and Human Resource Development.
