= Pir of Pagaro VIII =

Pakistani politician

Sibghatullah Shah Rashdi III Pir of Pagaro VIII
- پير پاڳارو پیر پگارا
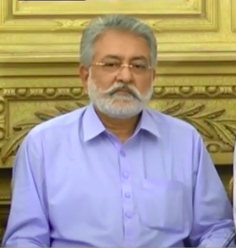

Leader of the GDA
- Incumbent
- Assumed office 23 October 2017

President of the PML(F)
- Incumbent
- Assumed office 11 January 2012
- Preceded by: Syed Shah Mardan Shah-II

Personal details
- Party: GDA (2017-present)
- Other political affiliations: PML(F) (2012-2017)
- Parent: Syed Shah Mardan Shah-II (father)
- Relatives: Pir of Pagaro VI (grandfather)
- Occupation: Politician

Sibghatullah Shah Rashdi III (Sindhi: صبغت الله شاهه راشدي, Urdu: پير صبغت الله شاه راشدي), also known as Raja Saein, the eighth Pir of Pagaro, (born 14 February 1956) is a Pakistani politician who has served as a member of Provincial Assembly of Sindh.

== Early life and career ==
He is the eldest son of 7th Pir Pagaro Syed Shah Mardan Shah-II who died on 10 January 2012. He is the 8th Pir Pagaro since 12 January 2012. He is currently the President of the Pakistan Muslim League (F) and the leader of the Grand Democratic Alliance.

== Family ==
He has four sons, Muhammad Rashid Shah Rashidi, Abu Bakar Shah Rashidi, Osman Shah Rashidi and Omar Mustafa Shah Rashidi.

In 1994, he disinherited his 4 younger sons due to association and involvement in criminal activities, he gave them their portions and revoked association with them. He stated that they have no association with him, the Pakistan Muslim League (F) or the shrine of Muhammad Rashid Shah Rozay Dhani.

== Political career ==
He was the Chairman of the District Council of Khairpur in 1983. He has thrice been elected to the Sindh Assembly and been a provincial minister. He became the President of the Pakistan Muslim League (F) after the death of his father Syed Shah Mardan Shah-II in 2012. Before the 2018 general election on 23 October 2017, he participated in forming the Grand Democratic Alliance (GDA) with other political parties in Sindh. He announced a manifesto to provide Education Health and Justice to the people.

== See also ==
- Hurs

| Preceded by Pir Syed Shah Mardan Shah-II | Pir Pagara; 2012 – present | Succeeded by Incumbent |

| Preceded by Syed Shah Mardan Shah-II | Leader of Pakistan Muslim League (F); 2012 – present | Succeeded by Incumbent |
