= Pakistan Peoples Party Workers =

Faction

Pakistan Peoples Party Workers پاکستان پیپلز پارٹی ورکرز
- Abbreviation: PPP-W
- President: Safdar Ali Abbasi
- Founded: October 22, 2014
- Split from: PPP; PPPP
- Ideology: Populism; Social democracy
- Political position: Centre-left
- National affiliation: Grand Democratic Alliance
- International affiliation: Socialist International

Election symbol
- Victory sign

Party flag

Pakistan Peoples Party Workers (Urdu: پاکستان پیپلز پارٹی ورکرز; abbreviated PPP-W) is a breakaway faction of Pakistan Peoples Party. The aggrieved workers of the party founded it on October 22, 2014. Safdar Ali Abbasi was elected to its presidency through resolution. The party was registered with the Election Commission on May 8, 2015 by its president.
