= Naeem Ahmed Kharal =

Pakistani politician (1957–2026)

- نعيم احمد کرل

Member of the Provincial Assembly of Sindh
- In office 13 August 2018 – 11 August 2018
- Constituency: PS-31 Khairpur-VI
- In office 29 May 2013 – 28 May 2018

Personal details
- Born: 19 January 1957 Khairpur District, West Pakistan, Pakistan
- Died: 21 June 2026 (aged 69)
- Party: PPP (2013-2026)
- Relations: Asfandyar Khan Kharal (nephew)

Naeem Ahmed Kharal (Sindhi: نعيم احمد کرل; 19 January 1957 – 21 June 2026) was a Pakistani politician who was a Member of the Provincial Assembly of Sindh, from August 2018 and from May 2013 to May 2018.

== Early life and education ==
Kharal was born in Khairpur District on 19 January 1957.

He had a Bachelor of Arts degree from Karachi University.

== Political career ==
Kharal was elected to the Provincial Assembly of Sindh as a candidate of the Pakistan Peoples Party (PPP) from Constituency PS-34 KHAIRPUR-VI in the 2013 Pakistani general election.

He was re-elected to the Provincial Assembly of Sindh as a candidate of PPP from Constituency PS-31 (Khairpur-VI) in 2018 Pakistani general election.

== Death ==
Kharal died on 21 June 2026, at the age of 69.
