= Raza Haroon =

Pakistani politician

Muhammad Raza Haroon

Member of the Provincial Assembly of Sindh
- In office 2008–2013
- Constituency: PS-115 (Karachi-XXVII)

Personal details
- Born: 4 October 1965 (age 61) Karachi, Sindh, Pakistan
- Party: MQM-P (2025-present)
- Other political affiliations: PPP (2023-2025); PSP (2016-2018); MQM-L (1987-2016)
- Spouse: Bushra Raza
- Education: B.Com; BSc
- Alma mater: University of Karachi; Canadian School of Management

Muhammad Raza Haroon (Urdu: محمد رضا ہارون) (born 4 October 1965) is a Pakistani politician who was senior leader of Muttahida Qaumi Movement (MQM) until he joined Pak Sarzameen Party in March 2016. He then left PSP.

== Early life ==
Raza did his B Com from Karachi University and BSc in computers from a foreign private university in Karachi.

== Political career ==
Raza joined Muttahida Qaumi Movement in 1987 and moved to London in 1994 after Operation Clean-up begun. In 2007, he returned to Pakistan and was elected a member of Sindh Assembly on a ticket of Muttahida Qaumi Movement from PS-115 (Karachi) in the 2008 general elections and served as provincial minister of Sindh for information and technology in 2009.

In March 2016, he left Muttahida Qaumi Movement to form along with others the Pak Sarzameen Party. He then revealed he left PSP.

In December 2023, he joined PPP on the invitation of President Asif Ali Zardari.
