= Sajid Ali Banbhan =

Pakistani politician

- ساجد علي ٻانڀڻ

Member of the Provincial Assembly of Sindh
- In office February 2024 – 2029
- Constituency: PS-28 (Khairpur-III)

Personal details
- Party: PPP (2018-present)

Sajid Ali Banbhan (Sindhi: ساجد علي ٻانڀڻ) is a Pakistani politician who had been a member of the Provincial Assembly of Sindh from August 2018 till August 2023. In the February 2024 general elections he was re-elected as Member Provincial Assembly Sindh.

== Education ==
He received a degree of Bachelor of Arts from Shah Abdul Latif University.

== Political career ==
He was elected to the Provincial Assembly of Sindh as a candidate of Pakistan Peoples Party from Constituency PS-28 (Khairpur-III) in the 2018 Pakistani general election.
