= Kingri Tehsil =

ڪنگري
- Tehsil
- Kingri
- Country: Pakistan
- Province: Sindh
- District: Khairpur District
- Capital: Karachi

Government
  - Tehsil Chairman: Sayed Najeebullah Shah Rashidi (2015)
  - City Chairman: Abdul Gafar Memon (2015)
- Time zone: UTC+5 (PST)
- Number of towns: 1

Kingri (Sindhi: ڪنگري) is a Tehsil of Khairpur District in the Sindh province of Pakistan, it is administratively subdivided into 10 Union Councils. The Sindhi-language word kingri is taken from "keenger", meaning clay utensils or clay pots, as in earlier times in the south of current city of Pir Jo Goth there used to live tribes of Kumhar People (Kumbher in Sindhi) who used to make clay pots. Taluka Kingri's headquarters is Pir Jo Goth, According to Nabi Bux Khan Baloch city was founded on 3 October 1883. According to 2017 census, the population of Taluka is about 340,218, with 56,915 households.

Taluka Kingri, Khairpur Mir's Sindh
