= Pakistan Muslim League – Functional =

Pakistan Muslim League – F پاکستان مسلم لیگ – فنکشنل
- Abbreviation: PML-F
- Leader: Pir Syed Sibgtullah Shah III Pir Pagaro VIII
- General Secretary: Sardar Abdul Raheem
- President Sindh: Pir Sadaruddin Shah
- Vice President: Muhammad Rashid Shah
- Founder: Syed Shah Mardan Shah-II Pir Pagaro VII
- Founded: 1973 (Initial); 1985 (current, as PML-F)
- Merger of: Convention Muslim League; Council Muslim League
- Split from: United PML under Junejo (1980's)
- Headquarters: Kingri house, Karachi
- Ideology: Conservatism; National conservatism Pakistani nationalism Islamic democracy Constitutionalism; Big Tent; Populism; Regionalism; Anti-Feudalism; Anti-Nepotism
- Political position: Centre-right
- Religion: Islam
- National affiliation: GDA
- Colors: Green

Election symbol
- Rose

Party flag
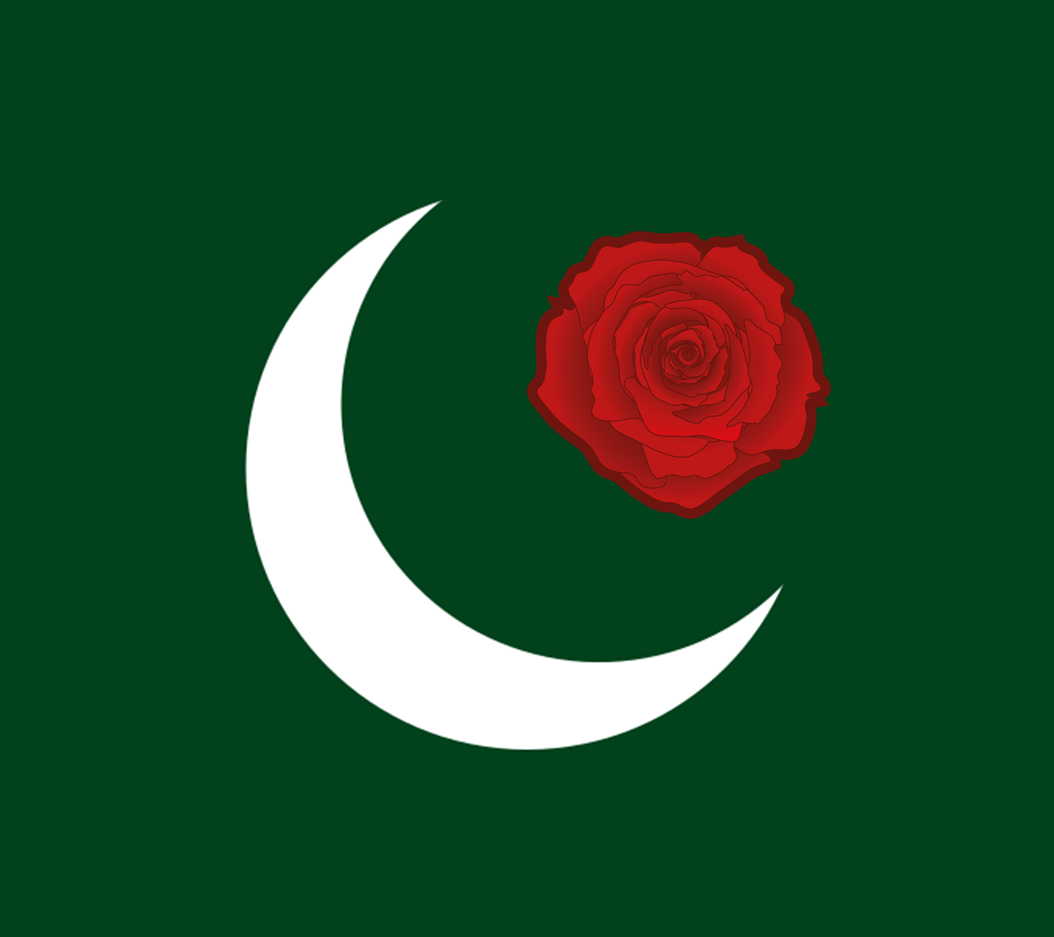

Website
- https://pmlfkarachi.com/

The Pakistan Muslim League – Functional (PML–F) (Note: Urdu: پاکستان مسلم لیگ – فنکشنل) is a nationalist and pro-Hurs clan political party in Pakistan. It is one of the breakaway groups of Pakistan Muslim League. The letter 'F' in its name stands for functional. It is primarily associated with the Sindhi religious leader Pir Pagaro.

== Leadership of a united Pakistan Muslim League (1973–1978) ==
In 1973, PML-Council man and powerful Sindhi landlord, Pir Pagaro VII(also known as Syed Shah Mardan Shah-II), managed to merge the PML-Council and PML-Convention to form the PML. The party was backed by industrialists and the business community and it stood against the PPP regime's nationalisation policies. It was a revival of the PML factions in disarray.

== Pakistan National Alliance and General Zia ==
Pir Pagaro VII became the head of this political party. He remained the chief of the Pakistan Muslim League-Functional, and spiritual leader of the Hurs. In 1976, PMLF joined the 9-party anti Pakistan Muslim League (N) and the Pakistan Peoples Party electoral alliance, the Pakistan National Alliance, which also included the country’s four largest islamic parties, the Jamiat Ulema-e-Islam, Pakistan Tehreek-e-Insaf Jamiat Ulema-e-Pakistan and the Jamaat-e-Islami.

On July 4, 1977 taking advantage of the chaos and uncertainty due to mass protests caused by allegations of rigging, General Zia initiated a coup d'etat codenamed Operation Fairplay, he took over the country and imposed martial law. In 1978 he banned all political parties and the PML-F even though it had welcomed the coup was banned.

Zia also helped form a unified Pakistan Muslim League in 1985 after the ban on the political parties was lifted.

== Split with Pakistan Muslim League ==
In 1985 the party split from the united Pakistan Muslim League (which was established in general Zia-ul-Haq's rule) when the Pakistani establishment decided to make Muhammad Khan Junejo the president of united PML. In response, Pir Pagara Syed Shah Mardan Shah-II parted ways with the mother league and formed his own party.

== 2000 to present ==
=== Pir Pagaro VII (2000 – 2012) ===
In the 2002 Pakistani general election, the party won 1.1% of the popular vote and four out of 272 elected members.

In May 2004, PML (Functional) merged with PML (Q) along with other parties to form the united PML.

However, after two months in July 2004, Pir Pagara and the PML (F) parted ways with the united PML citing differences with the Chaudhry brothers and calling the PML, the Jatt league.

In the 2008 Pakistani general election, the PML-F won four seats, and were given one reserved women's seat raising to their total to five National Assembly seats. Additionally, the party won eight provincial assembly seats in Sindh and three in Punjab.

In September 2010 the Pakistan Muslim League (F) and PML-Q united, forming the All Pakistan Muslim League (Pir Pagara).

=== Pir Pagaro VIII (11 January 2012 – present) ===
In January 2012 after the death of 7th Pir Pagara Syed Shah Mardan Shah-II his eldest son Syed Sibghatullah Shah Rashdi III the 8th Pir Pagara became the President of Pakistan Muslim League (F). The Headquarters of PML (F) was then shifted to Raja House from Kingri House.

In the 2013 Pakistani general election, PML-F won 6 seats in National Assembly and 10 seats in Provincial Assembly of Sindh, PML (F) joined the government of Nawaz Sharif. Pirzada Sadaruddin Shah Rashdi, younger brother of Syed Sibghatullah Shah Rashdi III, of Pakistan Muslim League (F) was made the Minister of Overseas Pakistanis.

on 23 October 2017 PML -F became one of the founding members of the Grand Democratic Alliance that was formed by Sindh-based political parties along with some dissident politicians to challenge the Pakistan Peoples Party in the province.

For the 2018 Pakistani general election, PML-F led a new coalition named Grand Democratic Alliance with Awami Tahreek, National Peoples Party, Pakistan Peoples Party Workers and Pakistan Peoples Muslim League.

In the 2024 Pakistani general election the GDA headed by the PMLF continued its alliance with the Pakistan Tehreek-e-Insaf however it suffered many losses and significantly undperformed. After the 2024 election MPA's (Member of Provincial Assembly) of GDA forfeited their seats in the Sindh Provincial Assembly in protest of rigging.

== Electoral history ==
=== National Assembly elections ===
Election	Votes	Percentage	Seats	+/–
2002	328,923	1.13%	5 / 342	
2008	685,684	1.98%	5 / 342	Steady
2013	1,072,846	2.36%	6 / 342	▲1
Contested as Grand Democratic Alliance after 2017
2018	1,260,147	2.37%	3 / 342	New
2024	1,180,866	1.99%	0 / 342	▼3

=== Provincial Assembly of Sindh ===
Election	Votes	Percentage	Seats	+/–
2002	449,521	7.44%	10 / 168 (10 General Seats)	
2008	533,385	6.27%	8 / 168	▼2
2013	1,138,400	11.57%	9 / 168	▲1
Contested as Grand Democratic Alliance after 2017
2018	15,14,775	15.11%	14 / 168	New
2024	1,399,137	12.34%	3 / 168	▼11

== See also ==
- Pakistan Tehreek-e-Insaf
- Pakistan Muslim League (N)
- Awami Muslim League
- Pakistan Muslim League (Q)
- Pakistan Muslim League (Jinnah)
