= Grand Democratic Alliance =

Pakistani political party

Grand Democratic Alliance گرینڈ جمہوری اتحاد گرانڊ ڊيموڪريٽڪ الائينس
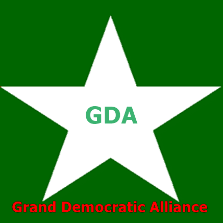
- Abbreviation: GDA
- Leader: Pir of Pagaro VIII
- General Secretary: Safdar Ali Abbasi
- Spokesperson: Saira Bano
- Founder: Pir of Pagaro VIII
- Founded: October 23, 2017; 8 years ago
- Ideology: Populism; Regionalism; Anti-feudalism; Anti-nepotism
- Political position: Big tent
- National affiliation: TTAP
- Colors: Green
- National Assembly of Pakistan: 0 / 366
- Provincial Assembly of Sindh: 3 / 168

Election symbol
- Star

Party flag

The Grand Democratic Alliance (abbr. GDA) (Note: Urdu: گرینڈ جمہوری اتحاد; Sindhi: گرانڊ ڊيموڪريٽڪ الائينس) is a Pakistani political party formed by a coalition of seven Sindh-based political parties. It was founded on 23 October 2017 by several regional parties along with dissident politicians from other parties as a political alliance against the Pakistan Peoples Party (PPP) in Sindh.

Accusing the PPP of political victimization of opponents by using Fascist and authoritarian political policies, It has been a critic of Asif Ali Zardari (the incumbent PPP president). The alliance has accused him of supporting nepotism and corruption in the region and usurping the Pakistan Peoples Party by using the Bhutto family name to gain power.

The alliance is actively struggling against despotism, theocratic & fascist terrorism, and economic exploitation of smaller constituent units with a special focus on Sindh and its people, The alliance is poised to play a pivotal role in parliamentary politics of Pakistan, by contesting elections and undertaking formal activities in regional political process, It also claims that the people of Sindh are unhappy with the PPP government.

== History ==
On 23 October 2007, Grand Democratic Alliance was formed in Sindh, Pakistan. On 26 November 2017, the leaders of the GDA participated in GDA's first official meeting to be held in Sukkur on November 26. The alliance was formed to defeat the Pakistan Peoples Party (PPP) in the Sindh province, which is considered a stronghold of the PPP. The alliance has been seen as a major challenger to the PPP in the 2018 elections. The GDA opposed the feudalist system in Sindh, Which is openly supported by the Pakistan Peoples Party (PPP) it has supported the anti-feudal elements against the Pakistan Peoples Party (PPP) in Sindh along with Pakistan Tehreek-e-Insaf (PTI).

During political unrest in Pakistan following the ousting of Imran Khan in 2022, the GDA leadership including the alliance head, Pir of Pagaro VIII issued statements supporting Imran Khan, mainly during the 2024 election.

=== 2018 general elections ===
For the 2018 Pakistani general election, the GDA joined hands with the Pakistan Tehreek-e-Insaf by forming seat adjustments in more than ten seats with the aim of defeating the PPP. As a result of the election, the GDA won 14 seats in the Provincial Assembly of Sindh, three seats in the National Assembly and garnered almost 15% of the vote in Sindh.

=== 2024 general elections ===
In the 2024 Pakistani general election, the GDA continued its alliance with the Pakistan Tehreek-e-Insaf during despite crackdown on the party. The GDA ran against PPP candidates in several constituencies, but unlike the 2018 election, the GDA did not win many seats and a much lesser number of two Sindhi provincial seats were won by the GDA. The elections countrywide and in Sindh were plagued with allegations of rigging in favor of the PPP and PML-N. These allegations were spearheaded by the PTI, but were supported by the GDA. In response to the elections, the GDA, as well as its allies, the Jamaat-e-Islami, JUI-F and PTI rejected the elections as rigged. The alliance’s head Pir of Pagaro VIII alleged that the elections were rigged, and forfeited the two seats in protest. The 2024 elections for the GDA are generally considered a defeat for the alliance, with it being overshadowed by the PPP and MQM-P according to some reports, However, the GDA and its allies attribute these results to rigging. The GDA then supported the opposition-led Tehreek-e-Tahafuz-e-Ayin-e-Pakistan ("Movement for the Protection of the Constitution of Pakistan").

==== Subsequent protests ====
The Grand Democratic Alliance’s leadership launched large-scale protests and marches against the PPP government in protest of their alleged rigging in the 2024 elections. The GDA declared February 27, the day of the election results as a ‘Black day’ and compared the Sindh elections to the 1970 elections where Sheikh Mujibur Rehman’s mandate was stolen. The protests were called a ‘million march’ by some sources and consisted of rallies and protests throughout rural Sindh, mainly in Karachi by GDA leaders. The anti-PPP protests and rallies were supported by the JUI-F, JI and PTI-SIC.

== Member parties ==
The following individuals and political parties are part of the GDA:

=== Parties joining later ===
Name		Flag	National Leader	Main ideology	Political Position	Symbol
SUP	Sindh United Party سندھ یونائیٹڈ پارٹی		Syed Jalal Mehmood Shah	Sindhi nationalism Regionalism; Democratic socialism	Left-wing	Car

=== Initial parties ===
Name		Flag	National Leader	Main ideology	Political Position	Symbol
QAT	Qaumi Awami Tehreek قومی عوامی تحریک		Ayaz Latif Palijo	Communism; Marxism-Leninism; Anti-capitalism	Far-left	Whistle
PML(F)	Pakistan Muslim League (F) پاکستان مسلم لیگ (ف)		Sibghatullah Shah Rashdi	Islamic democracy National conservatism Pakistani nationalism	Centre-right	Rose
SNF	Sindh National Front سندھ قومی محاذ		Mumtaz Bhutto	Sindhi nationalism Social democracy Democratic socialism	Left-wing	—
PPP-W	Pakistan Peoples Party Workers پاکستان پیپلز پارٹی ورکرز		Safdar Abbasi	Populism; Social democracy Social justice	Centre-left	Victory sign
PPP-SB	Pakistan Peoples Party (Shaheed Bhutto) پاکستان پیپلز پارٹی (شہید بھٹو)		Ghinwa Bhutto	Secularism; Democratic socialism Left-wing populism	Left-wing	Fist
NPP	National Peoples Party نیشنل پیپلز پارٹی		Murtaza Jatoi	Secularism; Regionalism; Egalitarianism	—	Hand saw

=== Former parties ===
Name		Flag	National Leader	Main ideology	Political Position	Symbol
PML(Q)	Pakistan Muslim League (Q) پاکستان مسلم لیگ (ق)		Shujaat Hussain	Conservatism; Liberal conservatism Pakistani nationalism	Centre-right	Tractor
