= Sindh =

Province of Pakistan

Sindh: سنڌ; سندھ
- Province
- Province of Sindh
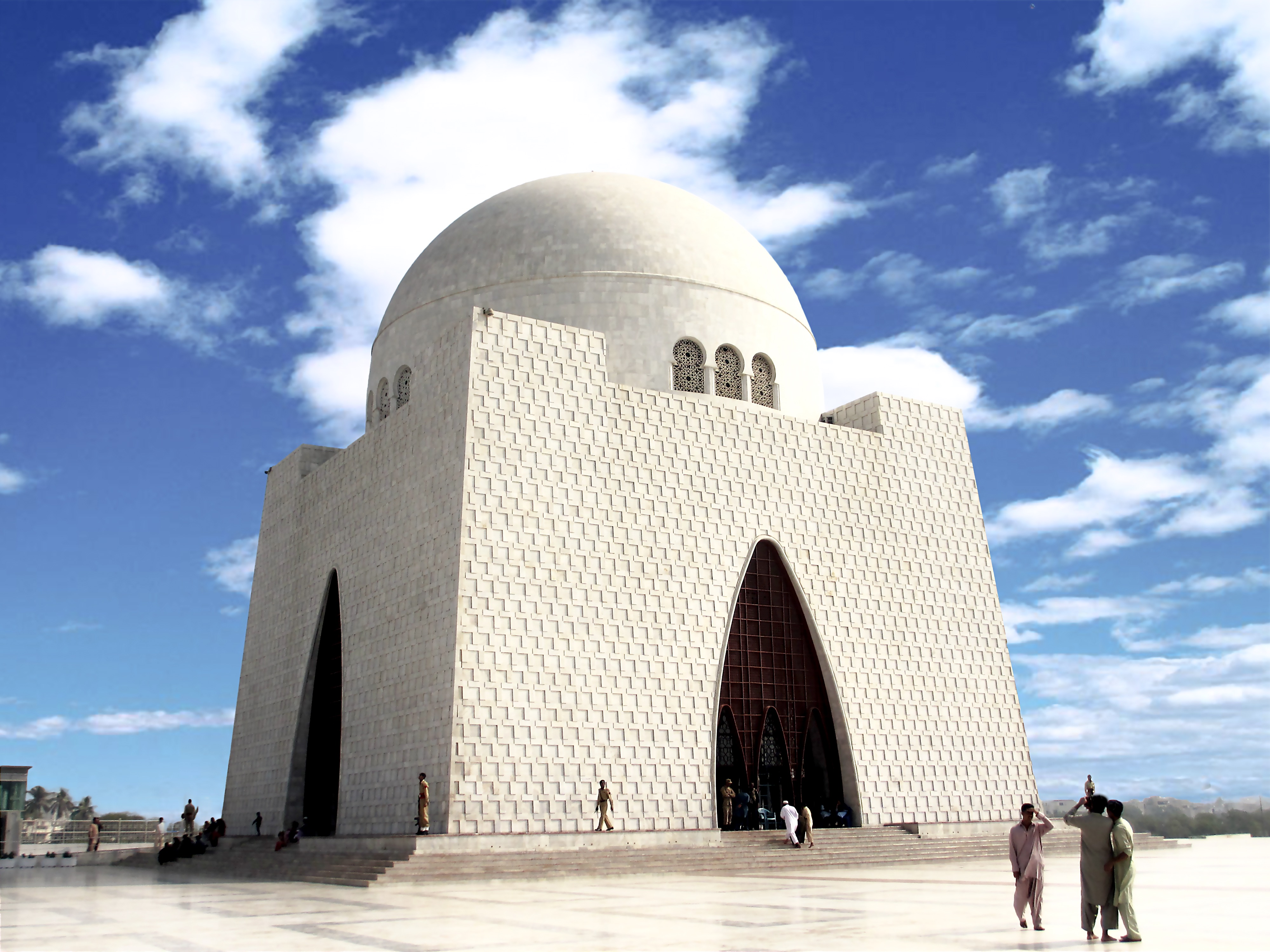
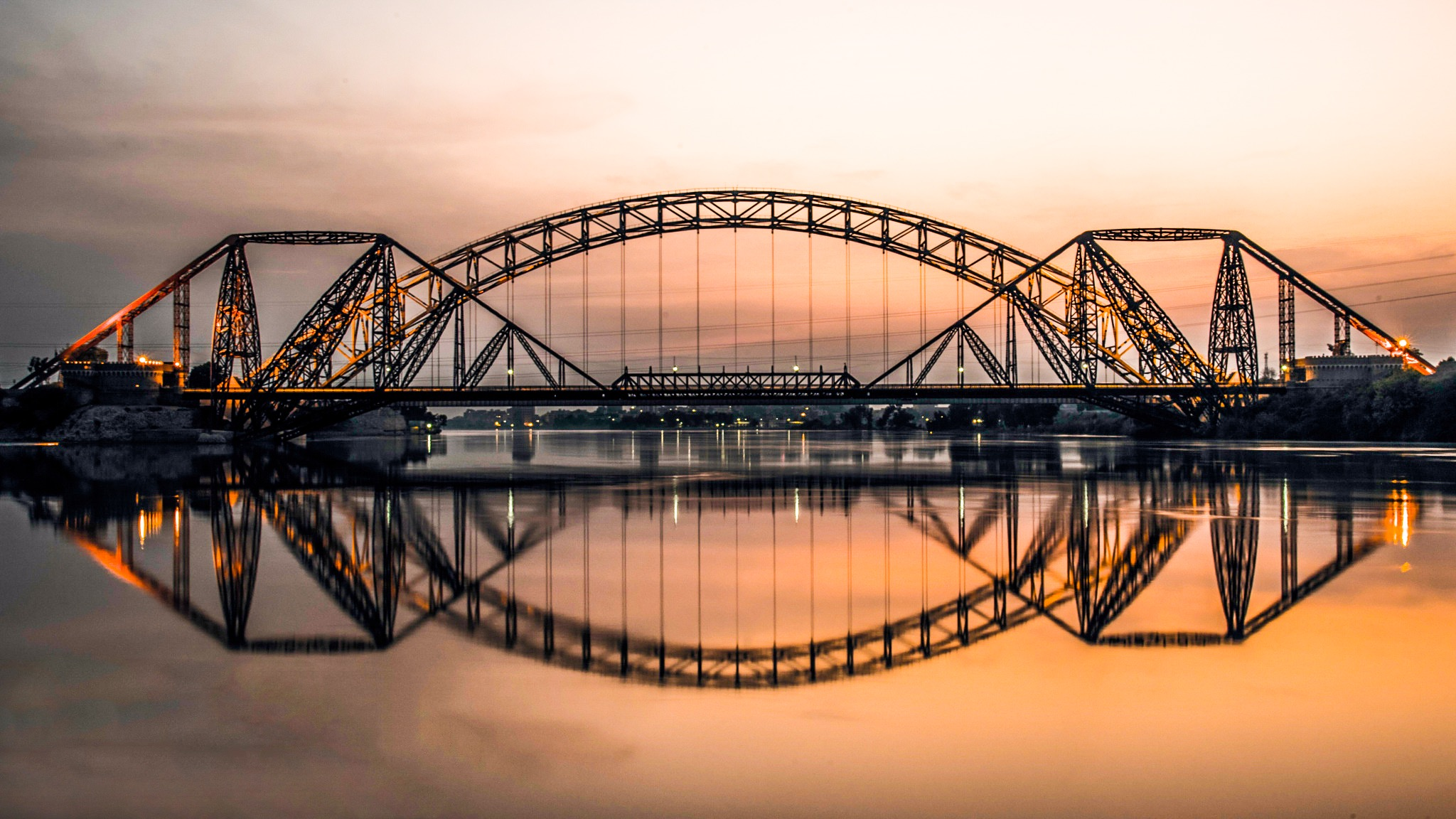
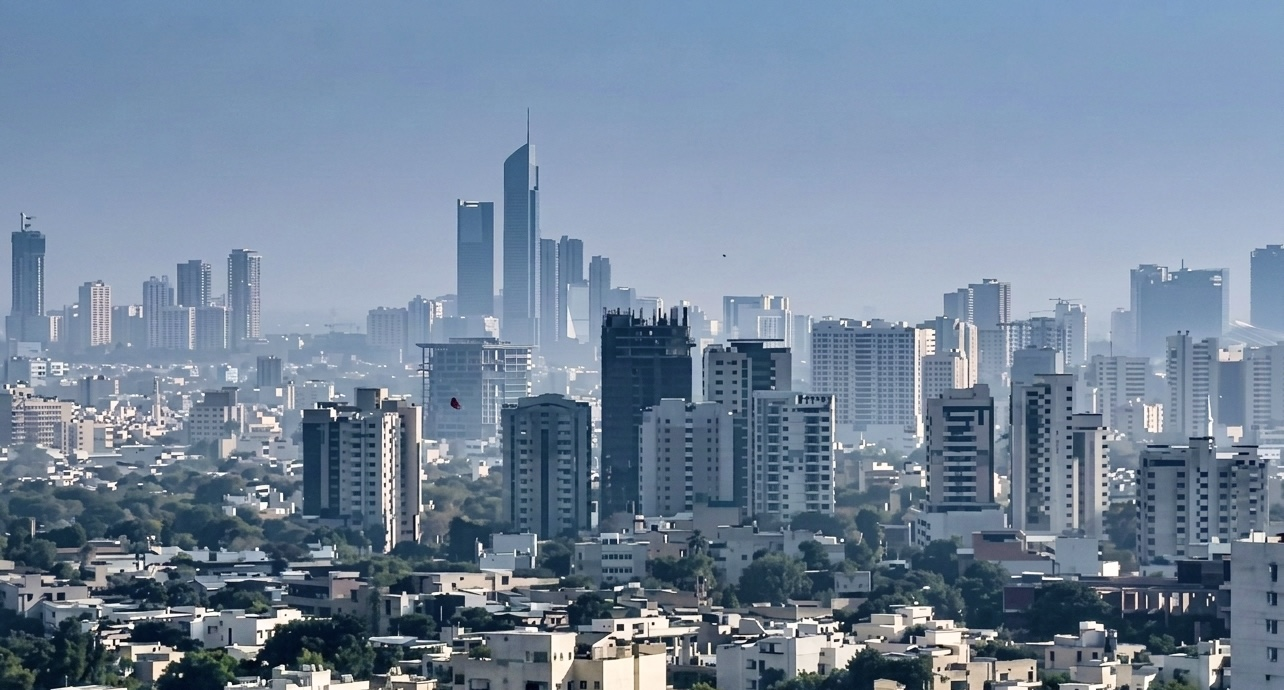
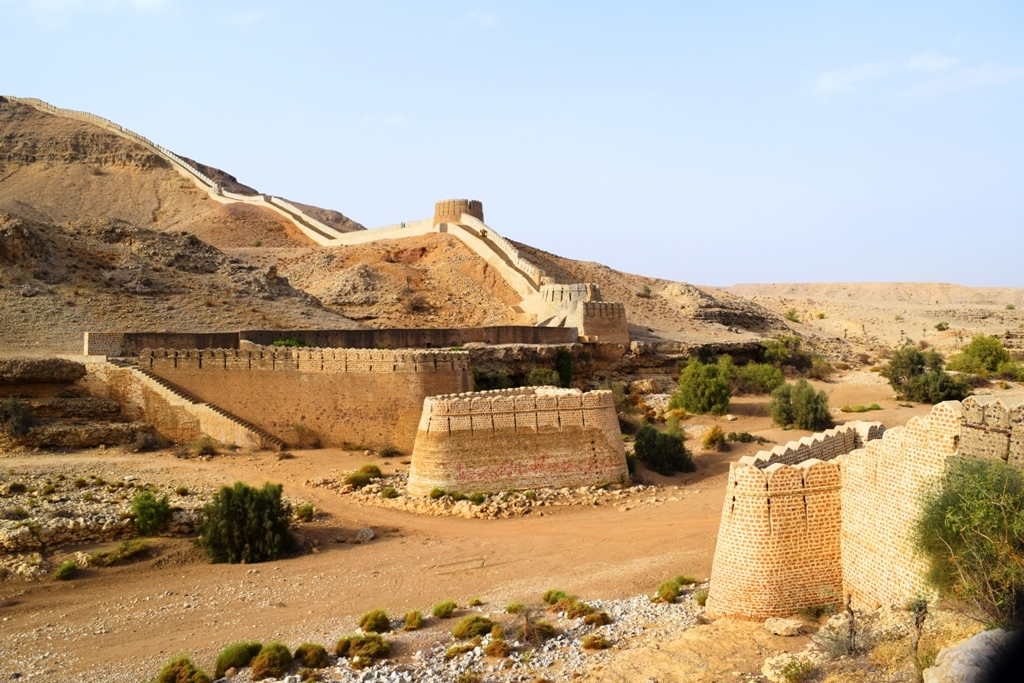
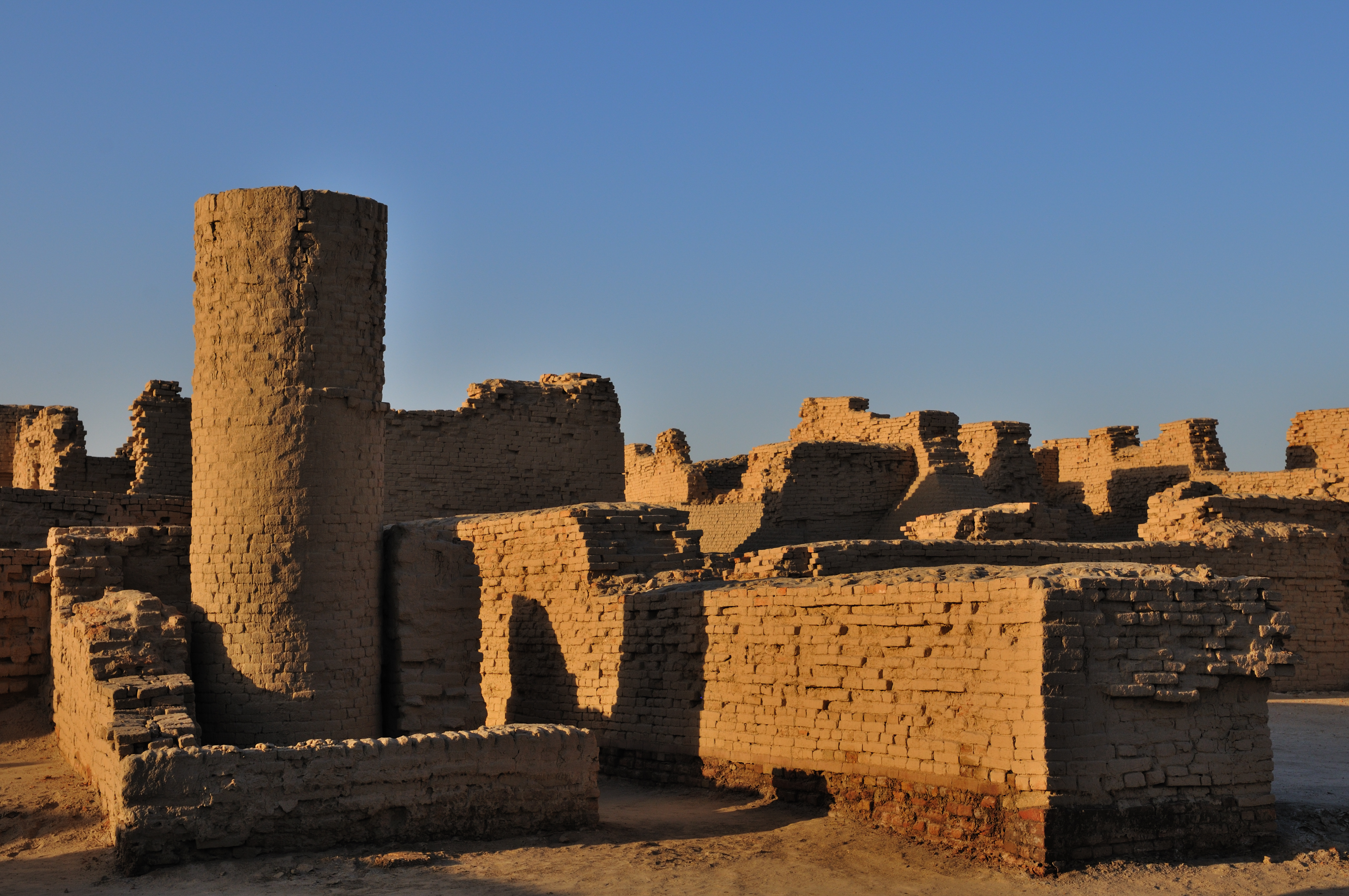
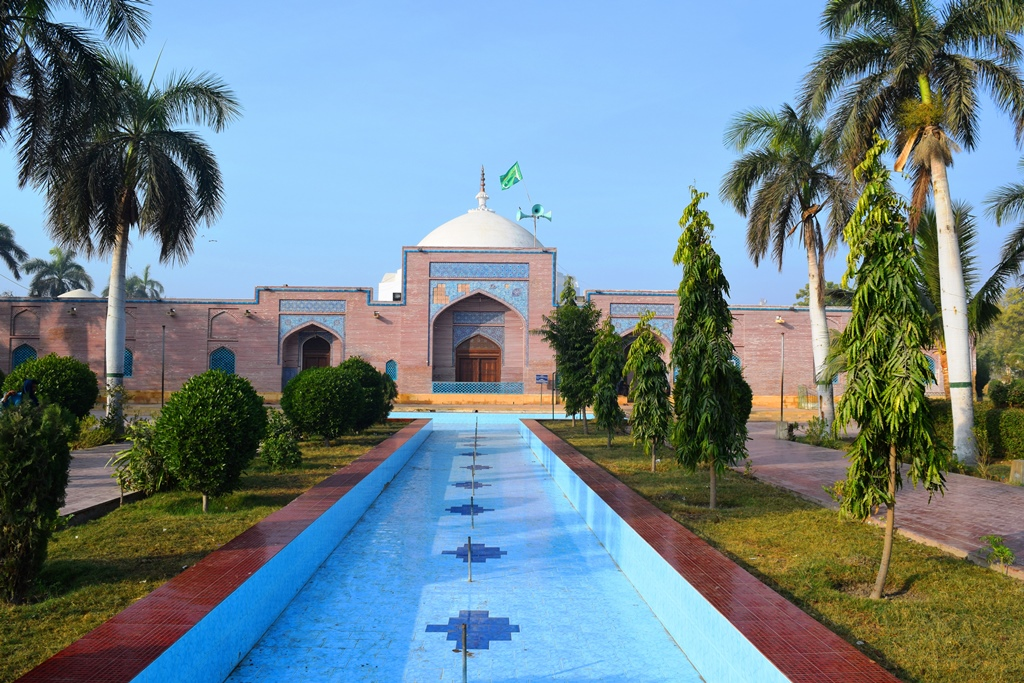
- Mazar-e-Quaid Ayub Bridge Skyline of Karachi Ranikot Fort Mohenjo-daro Shah Jahan Mosque

- Flag Seal
- Etymology: from Sindhū (Indus River), literally meaning 'river'
- Nicknames: Mehrān (Gateway); Bāb-ul-Islām (Gateway of Islam)
- Location of Sindh in Pakistan
- Coordinates: 26°21′N 68°51′E
- Country: Pakistan
- Established: 1 July 1970; 56 years ago (current form)
- Before was: Part of West Pakistan
- Capital and largest city: Karachi
- Divisions: 06: Hyderabad Karachi Larkana Mirpur Khas Sukkur Shaheed Benazirabad

Government
  - Type: Federated parliamentary system
  - Body: Government of Sindh
  - Governor: Nehal Hashmi (PML-N)
  - Chief Minister: Murad Ali Shah (PPP)
  - Chief Secretary: Syed Asif Haider Shah
  - Legislature: Provincial Assembly
  - High Court: Sindh High Court

Area
  - Total: 140,914 km^{2} (54,407 sq mi)
  - Rank: 3rd
- Elevation: 173 m (568 ft)

Population (2023 census)
  - Total: 55,696,147
  - Rank: 2nd
  - Density: 395/km^{2} (1,020/sq mi)
- Demonym: Sindhi

GDP (nominal)
  - Total (2022): $86 billion (2nd) (Note: Sindh's contribution to national economy was 23.7%, or $345 billion (PPP) and $86 billion (nominal) in 2022.)
  - Per Capita: $1,997 (3rd)

GDP (PPP)
  - Total (2022): $345 billion (2nd)
  - Per Capita: $7,209 (3rd)
- Time zone: UTC+05:00 (PKT)
- ISO 3166 code: PK-SD
- Official languages: Sindhi; Urdu; English (Note: Sindhi is the sole official language recognised and regulated on provincial level.; Official status of Urdu and English is recognised by the national constitution.)
- HDI (2023): 0.518 ▲ Low
- Literacy rate (2023): Total: (57.54%); Male: (64.23%); Female: (50.21%)
- Seats in National Assembly: 75
- Seats in Provincial Assembly: 168
- Divisions: 6
- Districts: 30
- Tehsils: 138
- Union Councils: 1108
- Website: sindh.gov.pk

Sindh (Note: /ˈsɪnd/ SIND; Sindhi: سِنْڌ; Urdu: سِنْدھ, pronounced [sɪndʱ]; abbr. SD, historically romanized as Sind or Scinde) is a province of Pakistan, located in the southeastern region of the country. It is the third-largest Pakistani province by land area and second-largest by population. It is bounded by the Arabian Sea to the south and borders the provinces of Balochistan to the west and Punjab to the north; in addition to sharing an international border with the Indian states of Gujarat and Rajasthan to the east. Karachi, located along the southern coast, is the capital and largest city. Sindh's landscape consists mostly of alluvial plains flanking the Indus River, the Thar Desert in the eastern portion of the province along the international border with India, and the Kirthar Mountains in the western portion along the provincial border with Balochistan.

The first settled life in South Asia emerged around Sindh and Punjab 9,000 years ago along the Indus River Basin, which gradually developed into the Indus Valley Civilisation. The Aryans migrated from Central Asia after 2000 BCE as the Indus Valley Civilisation gradually declined. Around 1000 BCE, the Indo-Aryan kingdom of Sindhu-Sauvīra emerged in Sindh which lasted until 518 BCE when the Achaemenids captured the region, followed by the Macedonians, the Mauryans, the Indo-Greeks, the Indo-Scythians, the Guptas, and finally the Sasanians in the 3rd century CE. Sindh emerged as an independent kingdom under the Rai dynasty in the 5th century, which was succeeded by the Chach dynasty in the 7th century. The Arabs conquered Sindh in 712 CE under the Umayyad Caliphate and established it as a caliphal province — laying the foundations of the Muslim period in South Asia, which lasted over a millennia.

The Habbari Emirate emerged in the 9th century which nominally pledged allegiance to the Abbasid Caliphate. Between the 11th and the 16th centuries, the Soomra, Samma, and Arghun dynasties ruled Sindh respectively — mostly under the vassalage of the Delhi Sultanate. The Mughal Empire captured Sindh in the late 16th century, and directly ruled it until 1701, when the Kalhora dynasty became the local rulers first under Mughal, and later Afsharid and Durrani, suzerainty. The rule of the Talpur dynasty began in 1783 and lasted until 1846 when the East India Company captured Sindh, with a branch of the dynasty continuing to rule Khairpur under British suzerainty. Initially a division in the Bombay Presidency, Sindh became a separate province in 1936 under the Muslim League's demands raised by Muhammad Ali Jinnah. Following the passing of the Lahore Resolution in 1940, Sindh became the first province to officially endorse the Pakistan Movement, and became part of the Dominion of Pakistan upon its independence in 1947. It was amalgamated into West Pakistan in 1955 until being restored to provincehood, with the inclusion of its historic territories, Khairpur and Karachi, in 1970.

The economy of Sindh is the second-largest in Pakistan; its provincial capital Karachi is the most-populous city in the country as well as its main financial hub. Sindh is home to a large portion of Pakistan's industrial sector and contains two of the country's busiest commercial seaports: Port Qasim and the Port of Karachi. The remainder of Sindh consists of an agriculture-based economy and produces fruits, consumer items and vegetables for other parts of the country.

Sindh is sometimes referred to as the Bāb-ul Islām (transl. 'Gateway of Islam'), or simply Mehrān (transl. 'Gateway'), as it was one of the first regions of the Indian subcontinent to become a part of Islamic world. The province is well known for its distinct culture, which is strongly influenced by Sufism, an important marker of Sindhi identity for both Muslims and Hindus. Sindh is prominent for its history during the Bronze Age under the Indus Valley civilization, and is home to two UNESCO-designated World Heritage Sites: the Makli Necropolis and Mohenjo-daro.

== Etymology ==
The Greeks who conquered Sindh in 325 BC under Alexander the Great referred to the Indus River as Indós, hence the modern Indus. The ancient Iranians referred to everything east of the river Indus as hind. The word Sind is a Persian derivative of the Sanskrit term Sindhu, meaning "river," a reference to vast Indus River.

The previous Perso-Arabic spelling Sind (سند) was discontinued in favour of Sindh in 1988 by an amendment passed in the Sindh Assembly.

== History ==
=== Ancient period ===
Mohenjo-daro

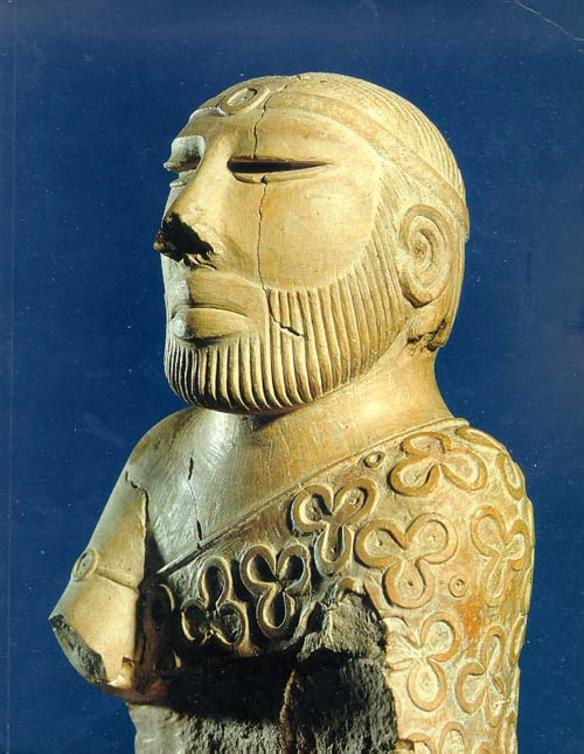
The "Priest King" sculpture is carved from steatite.

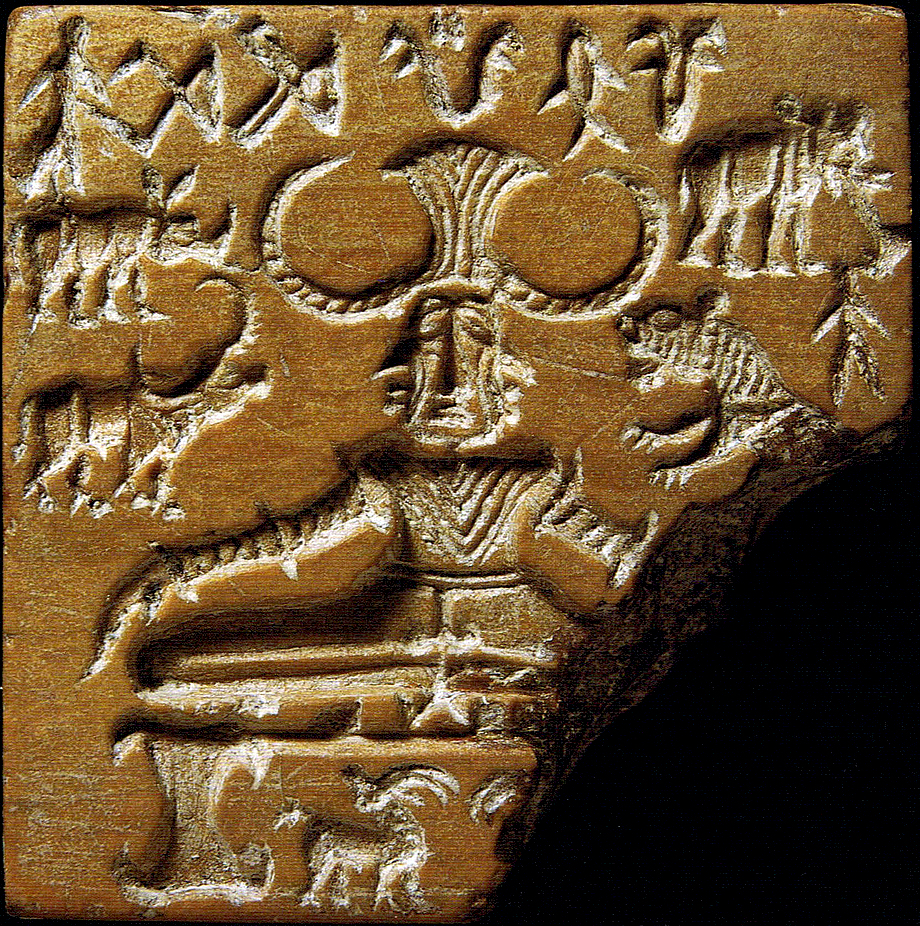
The Pashupati seal

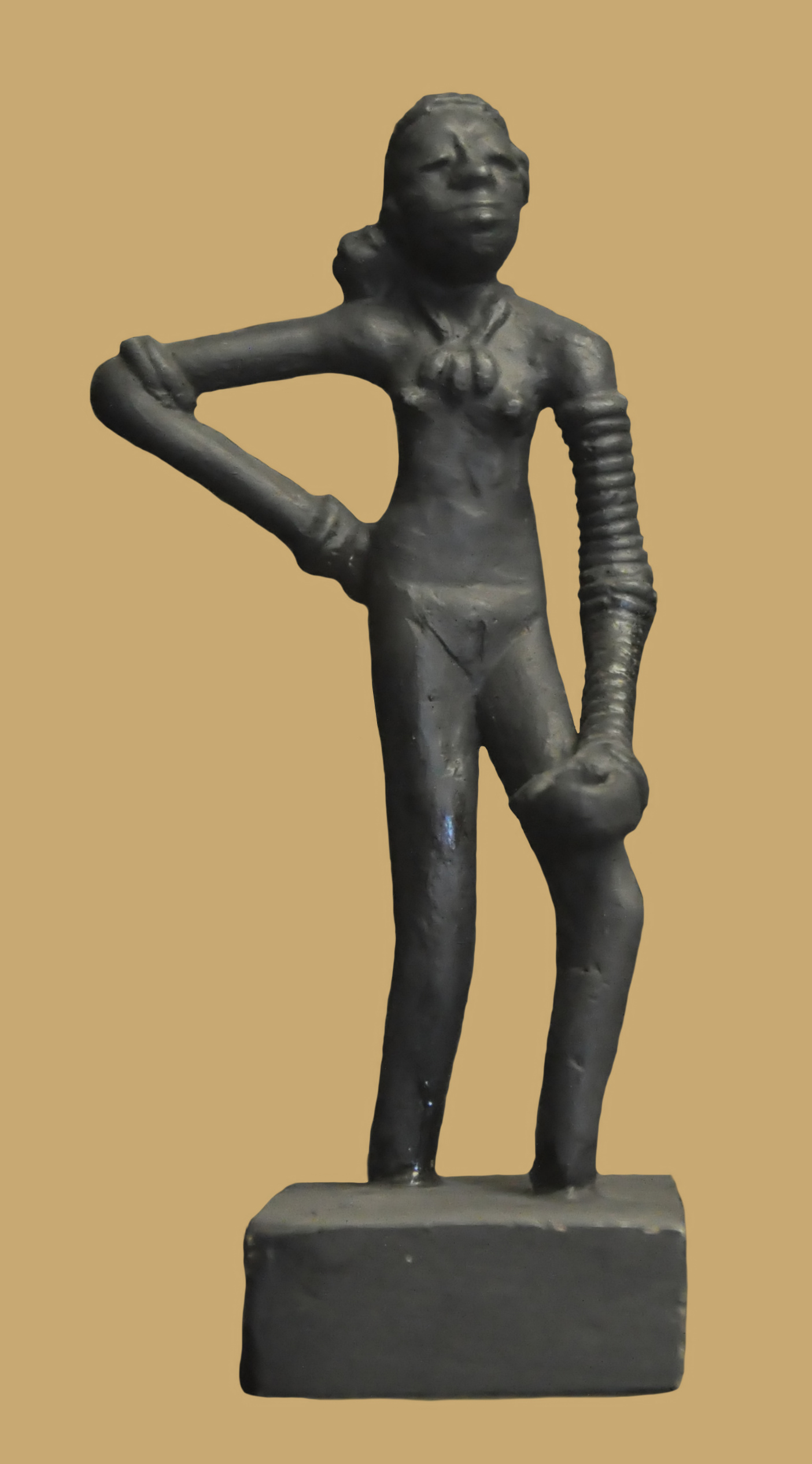
The Dancing Girl of Mohenjo-daro

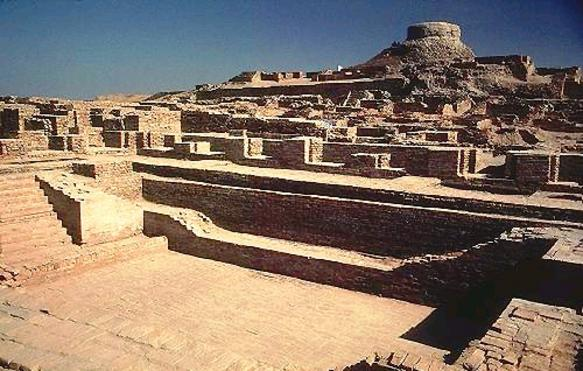
Excavated ruins of the Great Bath at Mohenjo-daro

Sindh and surrounding areas contain the ruins of the Indus Valley Civilisation. There are remnants of ancient cities and structures, with a notable example in Sindh being that of Mohenjo-daro. Built around 2500 BCE, it was one of the largest settlements of the ancient Indus Civilisation, with features such as standardized bricks, street grids, and covered sewerage systems. It was one of the world's earliest major cities, contemporaneous with the civilisations of ancient Egypt, Mesopotamia, Minoan Crete, and Caral-Supe. Mohenjo-daro was abandoned in the 19th century BCE as the Indus Valley Civilisation declined, and the site was not rediscovered until the 1920s. Significant excavation has since been conducted at the site of the city, which was designated a UNESCO World Heritage Site in 1980. The site is currently threatened by erosion and improper restoration. A gradual drying of the region during the 3rd millennium BC may have been the initial stimulus for its urbanisation. Eventually it also reduced the water supply enough to cause the civilisation's demise and to disperse its population to the east. (Note: Brooke (2014), p. 296. "The story in Harappan India was somewhat different (see Figure 111.3). The Bronze Age village and urban societies of the Indus Valley are some-thing of an anomaly, in that archaeologists have found little indication of local defense and regional warfare. It would seem that the bountiful monsoon rainfall of the Early to Mid-Holocene had forged a condition of plenty for all, and that competitive energies were channeled into commerce rather than conflict. Scholars have long argued that these rains shaped the origins of the urban Harappan societies, which emerged from Neolithic villages around 2600 BC. It now appears that this rainfall began to slowly taper off in the third millennium, at just the point that the Harappan cities began to develop. Thus it seems that this "first urbanisation" in South Asia was the initial response of the Indus Valley peoples to the beginning of Late Holocene aridification. These cities were maintained for 300 to 400 years and then gradually abandoned as the Harappan peoples resettled in scattered villages in the eastern range of their territories, into the Punjab and the Ganges Valley....' 17 (footnote): (a) Giosan et al. (2012); (b) Ponton et al. (2012); (c) Rashid et al. (2011); (d) Madella & Fuller (2006); Compare with the very different interpretations in (e) Possehl (2002), pp. 237–245 (f) Staubwasser et al. (2003))

During the Bronze Age, the territory of Sindh was known as Sindhu-Sauvīra, covering the lower Indus Valley, with its southern border being the Indian Ocean and its northern border being the Pañjāb around Multān. The capital of Sindhu-Sauvīra was named Roruka and Vītabhaya or Vītībhaya, and corresponds to the medieval Arohṛ and the modern-day Rohṛī. The Achaemenids conquered the region in the 6th century BCE and established the satrapy of Hindush. The territory may have corresponded to the area covering the lower and central Indus Basin (present-day Sindh and the southern Punjab in Pakistan). Alternatively, some authors consider that Hindush may have been located in the Punjab with its capital at Taxila. These areas remained under Persian control until the invasion by Alexander.

Alexander initially appointed a native dynast Sambus in present-day Sindh, but after the latter's rebellion replaced him with his general Peithon as governor. He constructed a harbour at the city of Patala in Sindh. After a war with Seleucus I Nicator, who had succeeded Alexander in Persia, Chandragupta Maurya forced him to cede all territories west of the Indus River in 303 BCE, while gifting him 500 elephants.

Following a century of Mauryan rule, by 180 BC the region had come under the Indo-Greeks, followed by the Indo-Scythians, who ruled from their capital at Minnagara. Later on, Sasanians from the reign of Shapur I claimed control of the Sindh in their inscriptions, calling it as Hind.

By the 5th century, Sasanian control, which in any case was tenuous as apparent from the distinct local coinage, weakened further with local ruler Ranaditya minting his own coins. The native Rai dynasty emerged in Sindh and reigned for a period of 144 years, concurrent with the Huna invasions of northern India. Aror was noted to be the capital. The Chach dynasty succeeded the Rai dynasty. Most of the information about its existence comes from the Chachnama, a historical account of the dynasty. After the dynasty's fall in 712, its members administered parts of Sindh under the Umayyad wilayat of Sind.

=== Medieval period ===
After the death of the Islamic prophet Muhammad, the Arab expansion towards the east reached Sindh beyond Persia. The connection between the Sindh and Islam was established by the initial Muslim invasions during the Rashidun Caliphate. The first clash with the Rai kings of Sindh took place in 636 (15 AH) under caliph Umar ibn al-Khattab with the governor of Bahrain, Uthman ibn Abu-al-Aas, dispatching naval expeditions against Thane, Bharuch and Debal. Al-Baladhuri states they were victorious at Debal but does not mention the results of other two raids. However, the Chachnama states that the raiders of Debal were defeated and its governor killed the leader of the raids. These raids were thought to be triggered by a later pirate attack on Umayyad ships. Al-Baladhuri adds that this stopped any more incursions until the reign of Uthman. Al-Hakim ibn Jabalah al-Abdi, who attacked Makran in the year 649, was an early partisan of Ali ibn Abu Talib. During the caliphate of Ali, a number of Jats of the region (known in Arabic sources as Zuṭṭ) came under the influence of Shi'ism with some participating in the Battle of Camel for Ali. Under the Arab Umayyads (661–750), many Shi'as sought asylum in the region of Sindh, to live in relative peace in the remote area.

In 712, Muhammad ibn al-Qasim defeated the last Chach maharaja Dahir who died fighting at the Battle of Aror, and annexed it to the Umayyad Caliphate. The Habbari dynasty ruled much of Sindh as a semi-independent emirate from 854 to 1024. Beginning with the rule of 'Umar bin Abdul Aziz al-Habbari in 854, the region became semi-independent from the Abbasid Caliphate in 861, while continuing to nominally pledge allegiance to the Abbasid Caliph in Baghdad. The Habbaris ruled Sindh until they were defeated by Sultan Mahmud Ghaznavi in 1026, who then went on to destroy the old Habbari capital of Mansura, and annex the region to the Ghaznavid Empire, thereby ending the Arab rule in Sindh. Later chroniclers like Ali ibn al-Athir (c. late 12th c.) and Ibn Khaldun (c. late 14th c.) attributed the fall of Habbarids to Mahmud of Ghazni, lending credence to the argument of Hafif being the last Habbarid.

The Soomra dynasty was a local Sindhi Muslim dynasty that ruled between early 11th century and the 14th century. They appear to have established themselves as a regional power in the power vacuum after the fall of Habbaris. The Ghurids and Ghaznavids continued to rule parts of Sindh throughout the eleventh and early twelfth century alongside Soomras. The precise delineations are not yet known but Soomras were probably centered in lower Sindh. Some of them were adherents of Isma'ilism. One of their kings Shimuddin Chamisar had submitted to Iltutmish, the Sultan of Delhi, and was allowed to continue on as a vassal.

Makli Necropolis
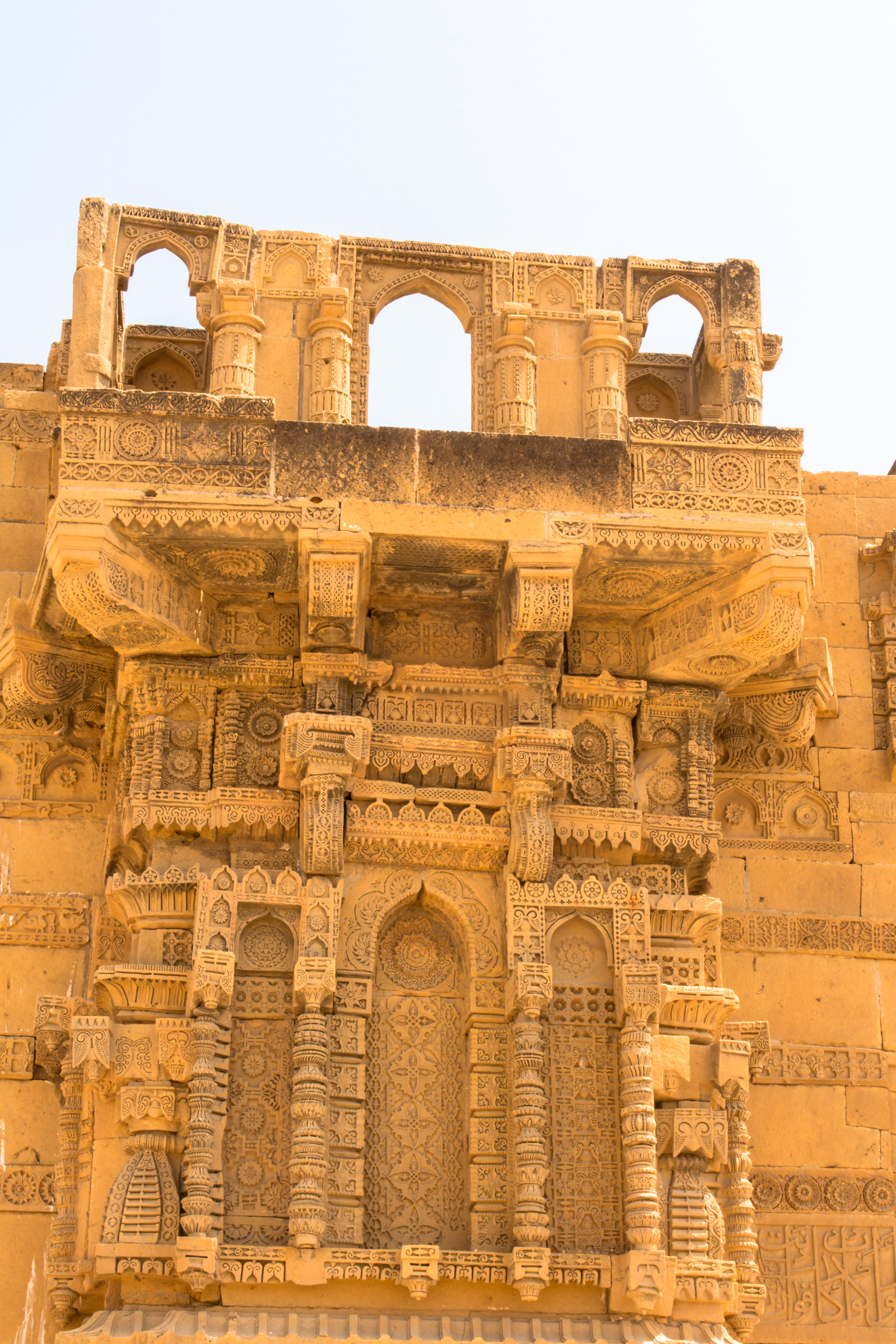
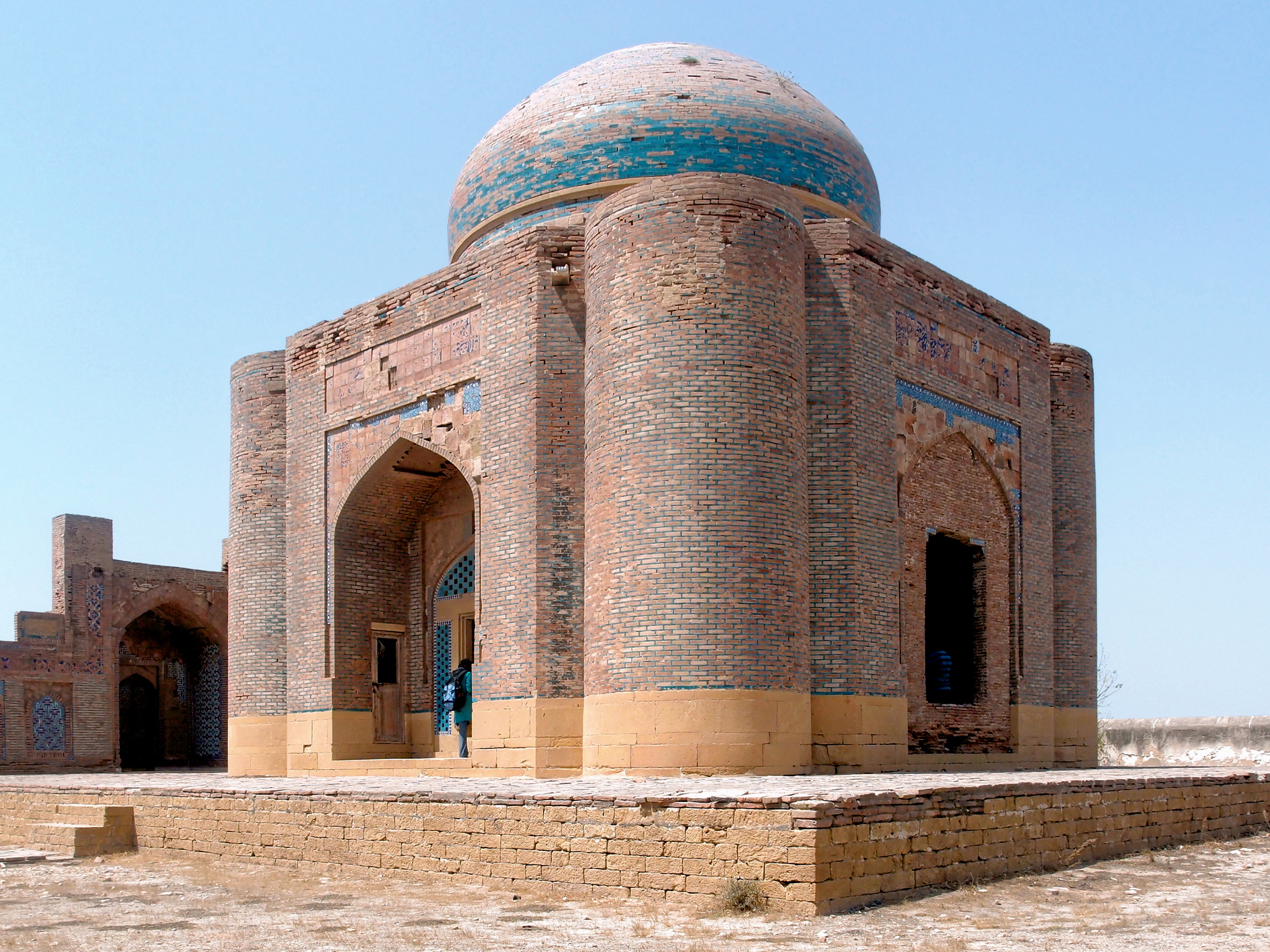
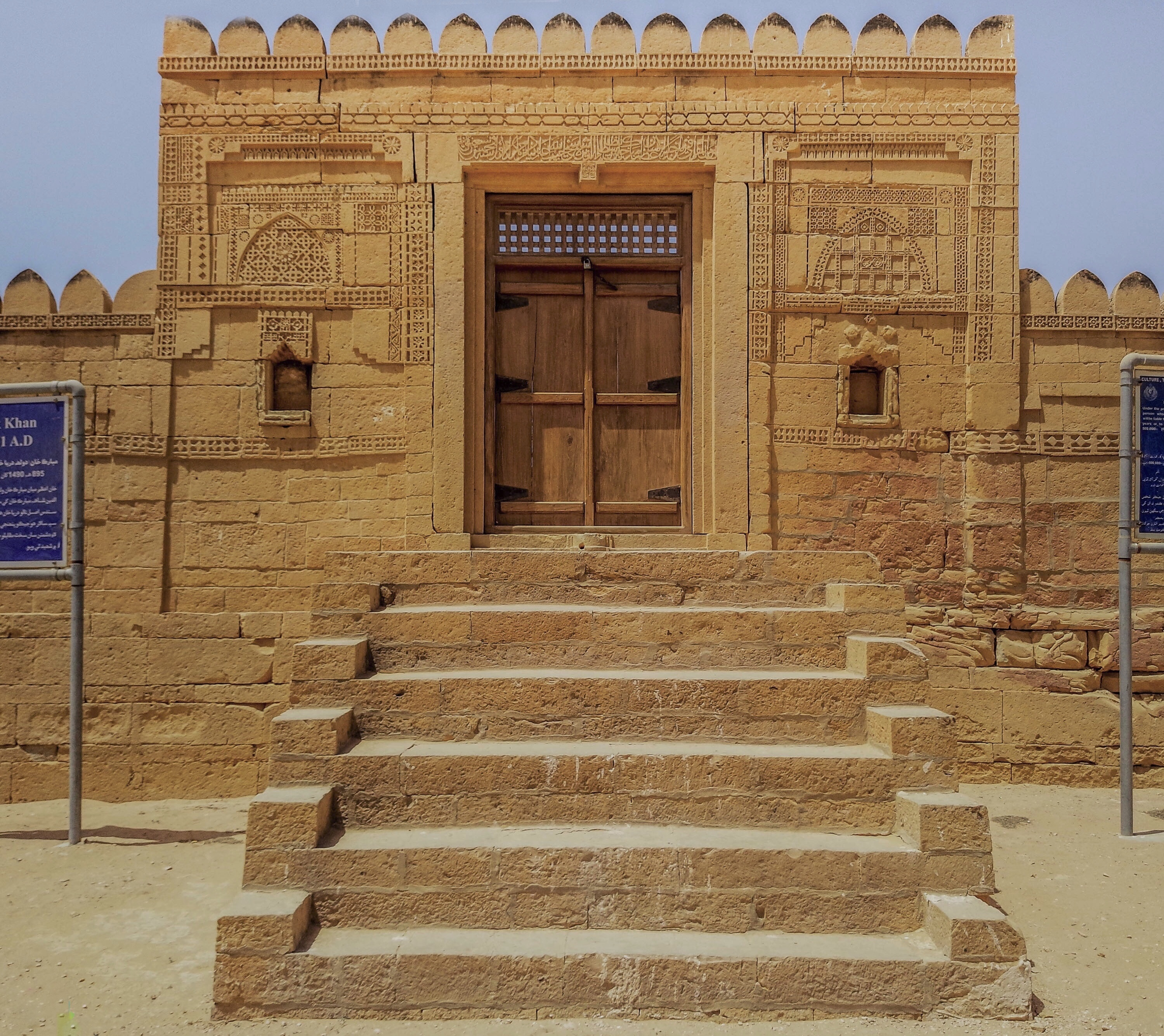
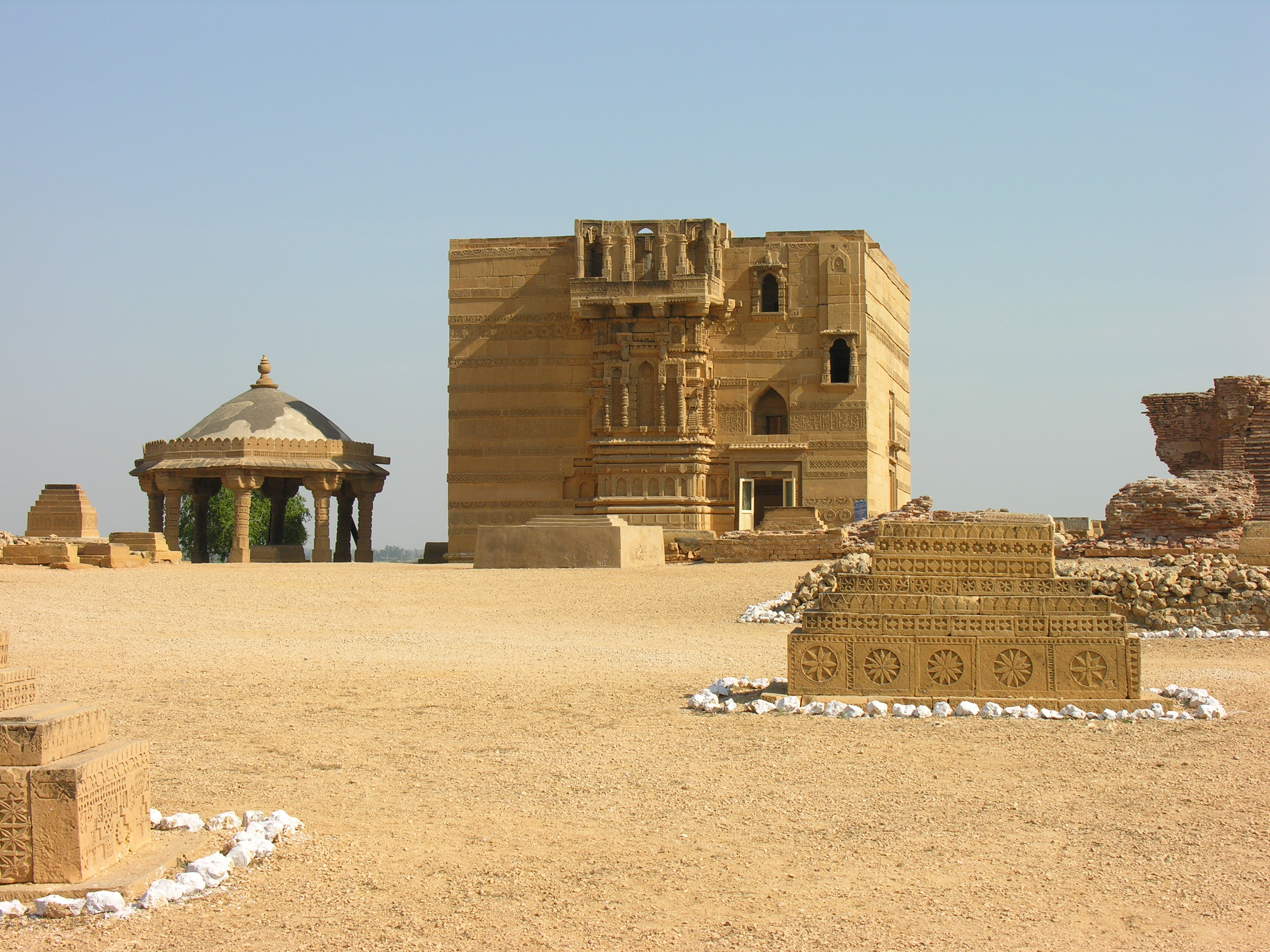
The Makli Necropolis at Thatta is one of the largest funerary sites in the world.

The Sammas overthrew the Soomras soon after 1335. The last Soomra ruler took shelter with the governor of Gujarat, under the protection of Muhammad bin Tughluq, the sultan of Delhi. Mohammad bin Tughlaq made an expedition against Sindh in 1351 and died at Sondha, possibly in an attempt to restore the Soomras. With this, the Sammas became independent. The next sultan, Firuz Shah Tughlaq attacked Sindh in 1365 and 1367, unsuccessfully, but with reinforcements from Delhi he later obtained Banbhiniyo's surrender. For a period the Sammas were therefore subject to Delhi again. Later, as the Sultanate of Delhi collapsed they became fully independent. Jam Unar was the founder of Samma dynasty as mentioned by Ibn Battuta. The Samma dynasty contributed significantly to the evolution of the Indo-Islamic architectural style. The city of Thatta is famous for its necropolis of erstwhile royals, the Makli Necropolis, which covers 10 square km on the Makli Hill. The Sammas have left a mark on Sindh with magnificent structures in Thatta. They were later overthrown by the Turko-Mongol Arghuns in the late 15th century.

=== Modern period ===
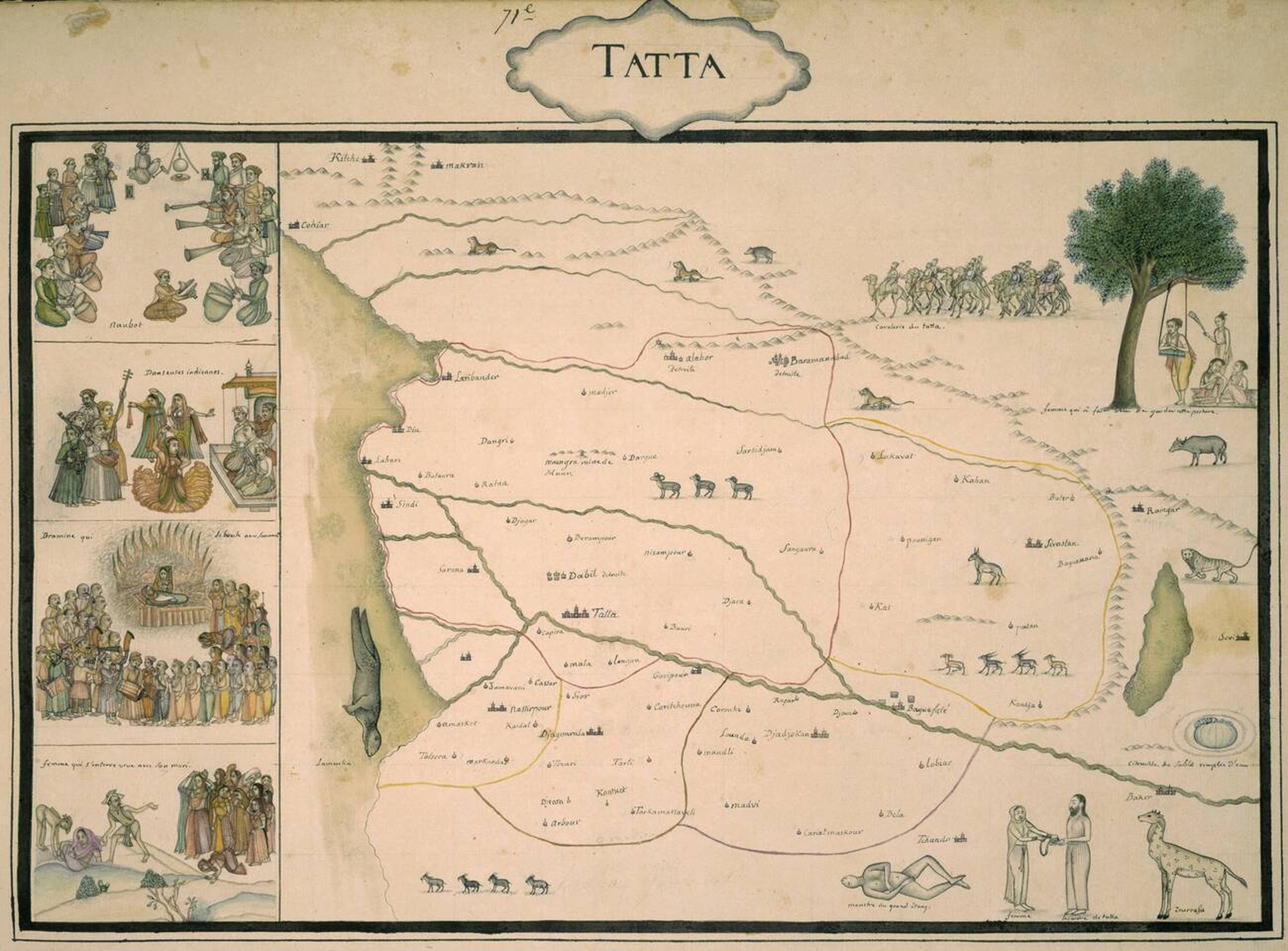
Elaborately illustrated map of the Thatta Subah of the Mughal Empire, commissioned by Jean Baptiste Joseph Gentil, ca.1770

In the late 16th century, Sindh was annexed into the Mughal Empire by Akbar, himself born in the Sodha kingdom in Umerkot in Sindh. In 1591–1593, Akbar sent an army to conquer lower Sindh from the Tarkhan dynasty after defeating the last Tarkhan ruler, Mirza Jani Beg; Jani Beg and his son Mirza Ghazi Beg.

Mughal rule from their provincial capital of Thatta was to last in lower Sindh until the early 18th century, while upper Sindh was ruled by the indigenous Kalhora dynasty holding power, consolidating their rule from their capital of Khudabad, before shifting to Hyderabad from 1768 onwards.

The Talpurs succeeded the Kalhoras and four branches of the dynasty were established. One ruled lower Sindh from the city of Hyderabad, another ruled over upper Sindh from the city of Khairpur, a third ruled around the eastern city of Mirpur Khas, and a fourth was based in Tando Muhammad Khan. They were ethnically Baloch, and for most of their rule, they were subordinate to the Durrani Empire and were forced to pay tribute to them.

They ruled from 1783, until 1843, when they were in turn defeated by the British at the Battle of Miani and Battle of Dubbo. The northern Khairpur branch of the Talpur dynasty, however, continued to maintain a degree of sovereignty during British rule as the princely state of Khairpur, whose ruler elected to join the new Dominion of Pakistan in October 1947 as an autonomous region, before being fully amalgamated into West Pakistan in 1955.

==== British Raj ====
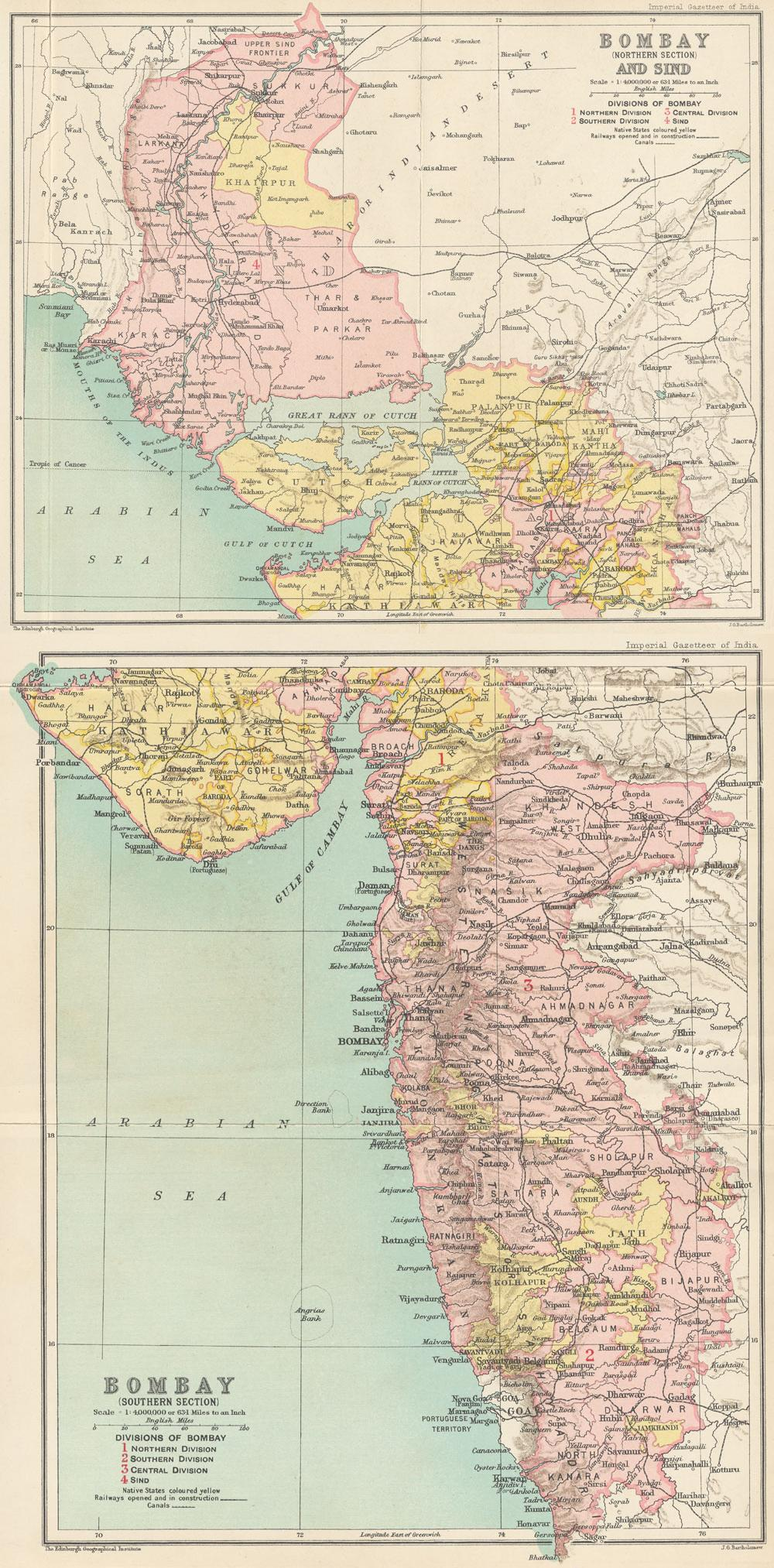
Sindh became part of the Bombay Presidency in 1909.

The British conquered Sindh in 1843. General Charles Napier is said to have reported victory to the Governor General with a one-word telegram, namely "Peccavi" – or "I have sinned" (Latin). The British had two objectives in their rule of Sindh: the consolidation of British rule and the use of Sindh as a market for British products and a source of revenue and raw materials. With the appropriate infrastructure in place, the British hoped to utilise Sindh for its economic potential. The British incorporated Sindh, some years later after annexing it, into the Bombay Presidency. Distance from the provincial capital, Bombay, led to grievances that Sindh was neglected in contrast to other parts of the Presidency. The merger of Sindh into Punjab province was considered from time to time but was turned down because of British disagreement and Sindhi opposition, both from Muslims and Hindus, to being annexed to Punjab.

Later, desire for a separate administrative status for Sindh grew. At the annual session of the Indian National Congress in 1913, a Sindhi Hindu put forward the demand for Sindh's separation from the Bombay Presidency on the grounds of Sindh's unique cultural character. This reflected the desire of Sindh's predominantly Hindu commercial class to free itself from competing with the more powerful Bombay's business interests. Meanwhile, Sindhi politics was characterised in the 1920s by the growing importance of Karachi and the Khilafat Movement. A number of Sindhi pirs, descendants of Sufi saints who had proselytised in Sindh, joined the Khilafat Movement, which propagated the protection of the Ottoman Caliphate, and those pirs who did not join the movement found a decline in their following. The pirs generated huge support for the Khilafat cause in Sindh. Sindh came to be at the forefront of the Khilafat Movement.

Although Sindh was less sectarian than other parts of India, the province's Muslim elite and emerging Muslim middle class demanded separation of Sindh from Bombay Presidency as a safeguard for their own interests. In this campaign, local Sindhi Muslims identified 'Hindu' with Bombay instead of Sindh. Sindhi Hindus were seen as representing the interests of Bombay instead of the majority of Sindhi Muslims. Sindhi Hindus, for the most part, opposed the separation of Sindh from Bombay. Although Sindh had a culture of religious syncretism, communal harmony and tolerance due to Sindh's strong Sufi culture in which both Sindhi Muslims and Sindhi Hindus partook, both the Muslim landed elite, waderas, and the Hindu commercial elements, banias, collaborated in oppressing the predominantly Muslim peasantry of Sindh who were economically exploited. Sindhi Muslims eventually demanded the separation of Sindh from the Bombay Presidency, a move opposed by Sindhi Hindus.

In Sindh's first provincial election after its separation from Bombay in 1936, economic interests were an essential factor of politics informed by religious and cultural issues. Due to British policies, much land in Sindh was transferred from Muslim to Hindu hands over the decades. Religious tensions rose in Sindh over the Sukkur Manzilgah issue where Muslims and Hindus disputed over an abandoned mosque in proximity to an area sacred to Hindus. The Sindh Muslim League exploited the issue and agitated for the return of the mosque to Muslims. Consequentially, a thousand members of the Muslim League were imprisoned. Eventually, due to panic the government restored the mosque to Muslims. The separation of Sindh from Bombay Presidency triggered Sindhi Muslim nationalists to support the Pakistan Movement. Even while the Punjab and North-West Frontier Province were ruled by parties hostile to the Muslim League, Sindh remained loyal to Jinnah. Although the prominent Sindhi Muslim nationalist G. M. Syed left the All India Muslim League in the mid-1940s and his relationship with Jinnah never improved, the overwhelming majority of Sindhi Muslims supported the creation of Pakistan, seeing in it their deliverance. Sindhi support for the Pakistan Movement arose from the desire of the Sindhi Muslim business class to drive out their Hindu competitors. The Muslim League's rise to becoming the party with the strongest support in Sindh was in large part linked to its winning over of the religious pir families. Although the Muslim League had previously fared poorly in the 1937 elections in Sindh, when local Sindhi Muslim parties won more seats, the Muslim League's cultivation of support from local pirs in 1946 helped it gain a foothold in the province, it didn't take long for the overwhelming majority of Sindhi Muslims to campaign for the creation of Pakistan.

==== Partition (1947) ====
In 1947, violence did not constitute a major part of the Sindhi partition experience, unlike in Punjab. There were very few incidents of violence on Sindh, in part due to the Sufi-influenced culture of religious tolerance and in part that Sindh was not divided and was instead made part of Pakistan in its entirety. Sindhi Hindus who left generally did so out of a fear of persecution, rather than persecution itself, because of the arrival of Muslim refugees from India. Sindhi Hindus differentiated between the local Sindhi Muslims and the migrant Muslims from India. A large number of Sindhi Hindus travelled to India by sea, to the ports of Bombay, Porbandar, Veraval and Okha.

=== Post independence ===
In the early years, Karachi acted as the capital of Pakistan with the provincial capital being relocated to Hyderabad. In 1955, all provinces, including Sindh, were abolished and merged to form West Pakistan as a counterweight to the demographically superior East Pakistan. This produced grievances in the other regions and finally, in 1970, old provinces were re-established. In 1960, capital was transferred to the newly built Islamabad with Karachi being returned to the province in 1970. In the 1970 elections, Z. A. Bhutto won in Sindh and Punjab, later serving as prime minister of the country from 1973 to 1977. His Pakistan People's Party (PPP) has continued to heavily dominate the politics of Sindh since 1970s. The import of the so-called Kalashnikov culture following the Soviet invasion of Afghanistan in 1979 and the influx of Afghan refugees deepened the already felt ethnic tensions in Sindh. The rise of MQM militancy gripped Karachi in the 1990s and 2000s and caused severe human and economic loss to the city. Since 2008, PPP has led the provincial government.

== Demographics ==
Demographic indicators
| Indicator | Value |
|---|---|
| Urban population | 53.97% |
| Rural population | 46.03% |
| Population growth rate | 2.57% |
| Gender ratio (male per 100 female) | 108.76 |
| Economically active population | 22.75% (old data) |

=== Population ===
Population history
| Year | Pop. | ±% |
|---|---|---|
| 1872 | 2,322,765 | — |
| 1881 | 2,542,976 | +9.5% |
| 1891 | 3,003,711 | +18.1% |
| 1901 | 3,410,223 | +13.5% |
| 1911 | 3,737,223 | +9.6% |
| 1921 | 3,472,508 | −7.1% |
| 1931 | 4,114,253 | +18.5% |
| 1941 | 4,840,795 | +17.7% |
| 1951 | 6,047,748 | +24.9% |
| 1961 | 8,367,065 | +38.4% |
| 1972 | 14,155,909 | +69.2% |
| 1981 | 19,028,666 | +34.4% |
| 1998 | 29,991,161 | +57.6% |
| 2017 | 47,854,510 | +59.6% |
| 2023 | 55,696,147 | +16.4% |
Source: Census in Pakistan, Census of British Raj (Note: 1941 figure taken from census data by combining the total population of all districts (Dadu, Hyderabad, Karachi, Larkana, Nawabshah, Sukkur, Tharparkar, Upper Sind Frontier), and one princely state (Khairpur), in Sindh Province, British India. See 1941 census data here:) (Note: 1931 figure taken from census data by combining the total population of all districts (Hyderabad, Karachi, Larkana, Nawabshah, Sukkur, Tharparkar, Upper Sind Frontier), and one princely state (Khairpur), in Sindh Province, British India. See 1931 census data here:) (Note: 1921 figure taken from census data by combining the total population of all districts (Hyderabad, Karachi, Larkana, Nawabshah, Sukkur, Tharparkar, Upper Sind Frontier), and one princely state (Khairpur), in Sindh Province, British India. See 1921 census data here:) (Note: 1911 figure taken from census data by combining the total population of all districts (Hyderabad, Karachi, Larkana, Sukkur, Tharparkar, Upper Sind Frontier), and one princely state (Khairpur), in Sindh Province, British India. See 1911 census data here:) (Note: 1901 figure taken from census data by combining the total population of all districts (Karachi, Hyderabad, Shikarpur, Tharparkar, Upper Sind Frontier), and one princely state (Khairpur), in Sindh Province, British India. See 1901 census data here:) (Note: 1891 figure taken from census data by combining the total population of all districts (Karachi, Hyderabad, Shikarpur, Tharparkar, Upper Sind Frontier), and one princely state (Khairpur), in Sindh Province, British India. See 1891 census data here:) (Note: 1881 figure taken from census data by combining the total population of all districts (Karachi, Hyderabad, Shikarpur, Tharparkar, Upper Sind Frontier), and one princely state (Khairpur), in Sindh Province, British India. See 1881 census data here:) (Note: 1872 figure taken from census data by combining the total population of all districts (Karachi, Hyderabad, Shikarpur, Tharparkar, Upper Sind Frontier), and one princely state (Khairpur), in Sindh Province, British India. Religious affiliation was not enumerated in Khairpur. See 1872 census data here:)

Sindh has the second highest Human Development Index out of all of Pakistan's provinces at 0.628. The 2023 Census of Pakistan indicated a population of 55.7 million.

As per a 2025 Dawn News report, based on data compiled by research organisation Population Council, UK Aid and the United Nations Population, Sindh had an annual growth rate of 2.57%. According to demographic projections, if the province’s current total fertility rate of 3.6 children per woman remains unchanged, Sindh's population could more than double to approximately 111 million by 2050.

=== Religion ===
Religion in Sindh according to 2023 census
1. Islam (90.0%)
2. Hinduism (8.81%)
3. Christianity (0.98%)
4. Ahmaddiya (0.03%)
5. Sikhism (0.01%)
6. Zoroastrianism (0.00%)
7. Other (0.07%)

Islam in Sindh has a long history, starting with the capture of Sindh by Muhammad Bin Qasim in 712. Over time, the majority of the population in Sindh converted to Islam, especially in rural areas. Today, Muslims make up 90% of the population, and are more dominant in urban than rural areas. Islam in Sindh has a strong Sufi ethos with numerous Muslim saints and mystics, such as the Sufi poet Shah Abdul Latif Bhittai, having lived in Sindh historically. One popular legend that highlights the strong Sufi presence in Sindh is that 125,000 Sufi saints and mystics are buried on Makli Hill near Thatta. The development of Sufism in Sindh was similar to the development of Sufism in other parts of the Muslim world. In the sixteenth century two Sufi tareeqat (orders) – Qadria and Naqshbandia – were introduced in Sindh. Sufism continues to play an important role in the daily lives of Sindhis.

In 1941, the last census conducted prior to the partition of India, the total population of Sindh was 4,840,795 out of which 3,462,015 (71.5%) were Muslims, 1,279,530 (26.4%) were Hindus and the remaining were Tribals, Sikhs, Christians, Parsis, Jains, Jews, and Buddhists.

Sindh also has Pakistan's highest percentage of Hindus overall, accounting for 8.8% of the population, roughly around 4.9 million people, and 13.3% of the province's rural population as per 2023 Pakistani census report. These numbers also include the scheduled caste population, which stands at 1.7% of the total in Sindh (or 3.1% in rural areas), and is believed to have been under-reported, with some community members instead counted under the main Hindu category. Although, Pakistan Hindu Council claimed that there are 6,842,526 Hindus living in Sindh Province covering around 14.29% of the region's population. Umerkot district in the Thar Desert is Pakistan's only Hindu-majority district. The Shri Ramapir Temple in Tandoallahyar whose annual festival is the second largest Hindu pilgrimage in Pakistan is in Sindh. Sindh is also the only province in Pakistan to have a separate law for governing Hindu marriages.

2020 community estimates indicated the Sikh population in Sindh stood at approximately 10,000, while the 2023 census indicated a population of 5,182 Sikhs.

Religion in Sindh (1872–2023)
| Religious group | 1872 | | 1881 | | 1891 | | 1901 | | 1911 | | 1921 | | 1931 | | 1941 | | 1951 (Note: Including Federal Capital Territory (Karachi)) | | 1998 | | 2017 | | 2023 | |
| Religious group | Pop. | % | Pop. | % | Pop. | % | Pop. | % | Pop. | % | Pop. | % | Pop. | % | Pop. | % | Pop. | % | Pop. | % | Pop. | % | Pop. | % |
|---|---|---|---|---|---|---|---|---|---|---|---|---|---|---|---|---|---|---|---|---|---|---|---|---|
| Islam | 1,712,266 (Note: Sunni Islam: 1,700,468 Shia Islam: 11,798) | 78.1% | 1,989,630 | 78.24% | 2,318,180 | 77.18% | 2,609,337 | 76.52% | 2,822,756 | 75.53% | 2,562,700 | 73.8% | 3,017,377 | 73.34% | 3,462,015 | 71.52% | 5,535,645 | 91.53% | 27,796,814 | 91.32% | 43,234,107 | 90.34% | 50,126,428 | 90.09% |
| Hinduism (Note: 1872 census: Also includes Tribals, Jains, and Nanakpanthis (Sikhs). 1881 census: Also includes Tribals and Nanakpanthis (Sikhs). 1891 census: Also includes Tribals. 1901 census: Also includes Tribals and Nanakpanthis (Sikhs).) | 475,848 (Note: Caste Hindu: 390,435 Scheduled Castes, Tribals, and Jains: 61,514 Nanakpanthis (Sikhs): 23,899) | 21.7% | 544,848 | 21.43% | 674,371 | 22.45% | 787,683 | 23.1% | 877,313 | 23.47% | 876,629 | 25.24% | 1,055,119 | 25.65% | 1,279,530 | 26.43% | 482,560 | 7.98% | 2,280,842 | 7.49% | 4,176,986 | 8.73% | 4,901,407 | 8.81% |
| Christianity | 3,329 (Note: Roman Catholic: 1,670 Church of England: 1,142 Native Christian (Oriental Orthodox & Syriac): 359 Presbyterian: 156 Greek Orthodox: 2) | 0.15% | 6,082 | 0.24% | 7,768 | 0.26% | 7,825 | 0.23% | 10,917 | 0.29% | 11,734 | 0.34% | 15,152 | 0.37% | 20,304 | 0.42% | 22,601 | 0.37% | 294,885 | 0.97% | 408,301 | 0.85% | 546,968 | 0.98% |
| Zoroastrianism | 870 (Note: Shensoy Sect: 712 Kadimi Sect: 158) | 0.04% | 1,063 | 0.04% | 1,534 | 0.05% | 2,000 | 0.06% | 2,411 | 0.06% | 2,913 | 0.08% | 3,537 | 0.09% | 3,841 | 0.08% | 5,046 | 0.08% | —N/a | —N/a | —N/a | —N/a | 1,763 | 0.003% |
| Buddhism | 67 | 0.003% | 9 | 0% | 2 | 0% | 0 | 0% | 21 | 0.001% | 41 | 0.001% | 53 | 0.001% | 111 | 0.002% | 670 | 0.01% | —N/a | —N/a | —N/a | —N/a | —N/a | —N/a |
| Judaism | 35 | 0.002% | 153 | 0.01% | 210 | 0.01% | 428 | 0.01% | 595 | 0.02% | 671 | 0.02% | 985 | 0.02% | 1,082 | 0.02% | —N/a | —N/a | —N/a | —N/a | —N/a | —N/a | —N/a | —N/a |
| Jainism | —N/a | —N/a | 1,191 | 0.05% | 923 | 0.03% | 921 | 0.03% | 1,349 | 0.04% | 1,534 | 0.04% | 1,144 | 0.03% | 3,687 | 0.08% | —N/a | —N/a | —N/a | —N/a | —N/a | —N/a | —N/a | —N/a |
| Sikhism | —N/a | —N/a | —N/a | —N/a | 720 | 0.02% | —N/a (Note: 1901 census: Enumerated as Hindus.) | —N/a | 12,339 | 0.33% | 8,036 | 0.23% | 19,172 | 0.47% | 32,627 | 0.67% | —N/a | —N/a | —N/a | —N/a | —N/a | —N/a | 5,182 | 0.01% |
| Tribal | —N/a | —N/a | —N/a | —N/a | —N/a | —N/a | —N/a | —N/a | 9,224 | 0.25% | 8,186 | 0.24% | 204 | 0% | 37,598 | 0.78% | —N/a | —N/a | —N/a | —N/a | —N/a | —N/a | —N/a | —N/a |
| Ahmadiyya | —N/a | —N/a | —N/a | —N/a | —N/a | —N/a | —N/a | —N/a | —N/a | —N/a | —N/a | —N/a | —N/a | —N/a | —N/a | —N/a | —N/a | —N/a | 43,524 | 0.14% | 21,661 | 0.05% | 18,266 | 0.03% |
| Others | 0 | 0% | 0 | 0% | 3 | 0% | 2,029 | 0.06% | 298 | 0.01% | 64 | 0.002% | 1,510 | 0.04% | 0 | 0% | 1,226 | 0.02% | 23,828 | 0.08% | 13,455 | 0.03% | 38,395 | 0.07% |
| Total Responses | 2,192,415 | 94.39% | 2,542,976 | 100% | 3,003,711 | 100% | 3,410,223 | 100% | 3,737,223 | 100% | 3,472,508 | 100% | 4,114,253 | 100% | 4,840,795 | 100% | 6,047,748 | 99.89% | 30,439,893 | 100% | 47,854,510 | 100% | 55,638,409 | 99.9% |
| Total Population | 2,322,765 | 100% | 2,542,976 | 100% | 3,003,711 | 100% | 3,410,223 | 100% | 3,737,223 | 100% | 3,472,508 | 100% | 4,114,253 | 100% | 4,840,795 | 100% | 6,054,474 | 100% | 30,439,893 | 100% | 47,854,510 | 100% | 55,696,147 | 100% |

=== Languages ===
Languages of Sindh (2023)
1. Sindhi (60.1%)
2. Urdu (22.3%)
3. Pashto (5.31%)
4. Punjabi (4.07%)
5. Balochi (2.17%)
6. Saraiki (1.64%)
7. Hindko (1.49%)
8. Others (2.88%)

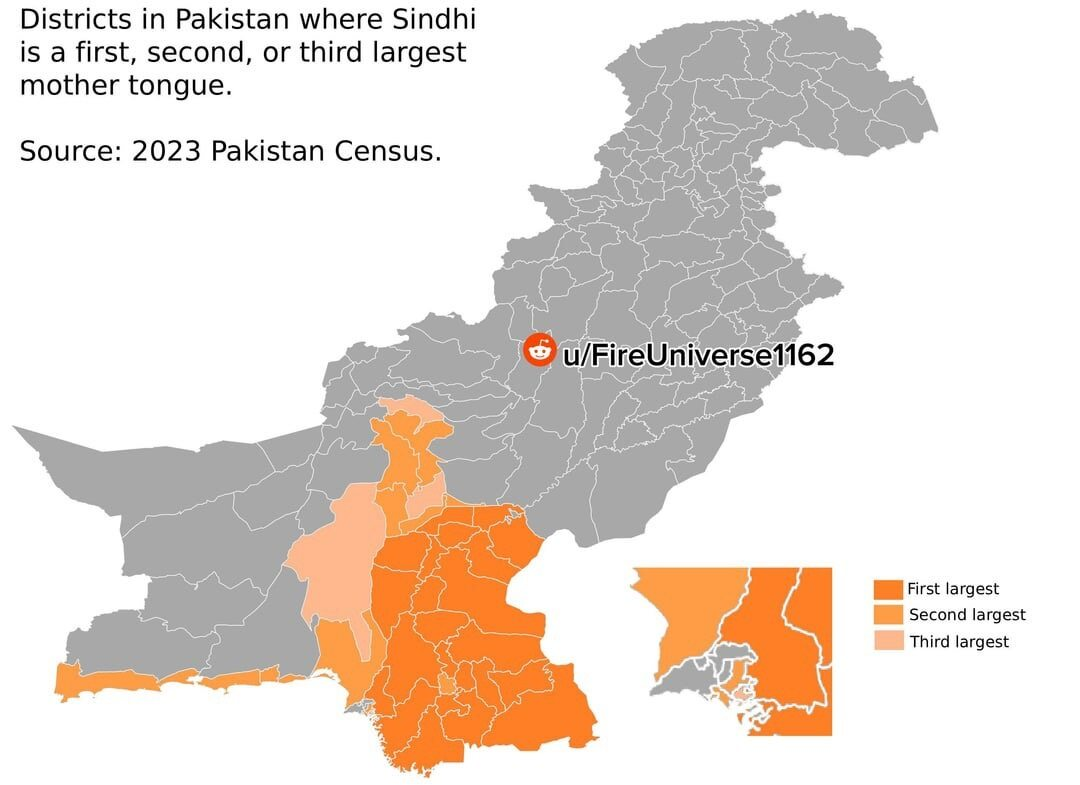
Sindhi as a first, second, and third largest mother tongue by district in Pakistan.

According to the 2023 census, the most widely spoken language in the province is Sindhi, the first language of 33,462,299 60% of the population. It is followed by Urdu 12,409,745 (22%), then Pashto 2,955,893 (5.3%), Punjabi 2,265,471 (4.1%), Balochi 1,208,147 (2.2%), Saraiki 913,418 (1.6%), and Hindko 830,581 (1.5), Brahui 265,769, Mewati 57,059, Kashmiri 53,249, Balti 27,193, Shina 22,273, Koshistani 14,885, 777 Kalasha and others are 1,151,650, Other minority languages include Kutchi, Gujarati, Aer, Bagri, Bhaya, Brahui, Dhatki, Ghera, Goaria, Gurgula, Jadgali, Jandavra, Jogi, Kabutra, Kachi Koli, Parkari Koli, Wadiyari Koli, Loarki, Marwari, Sansi, and Vaghri.

== Geography and nature ==
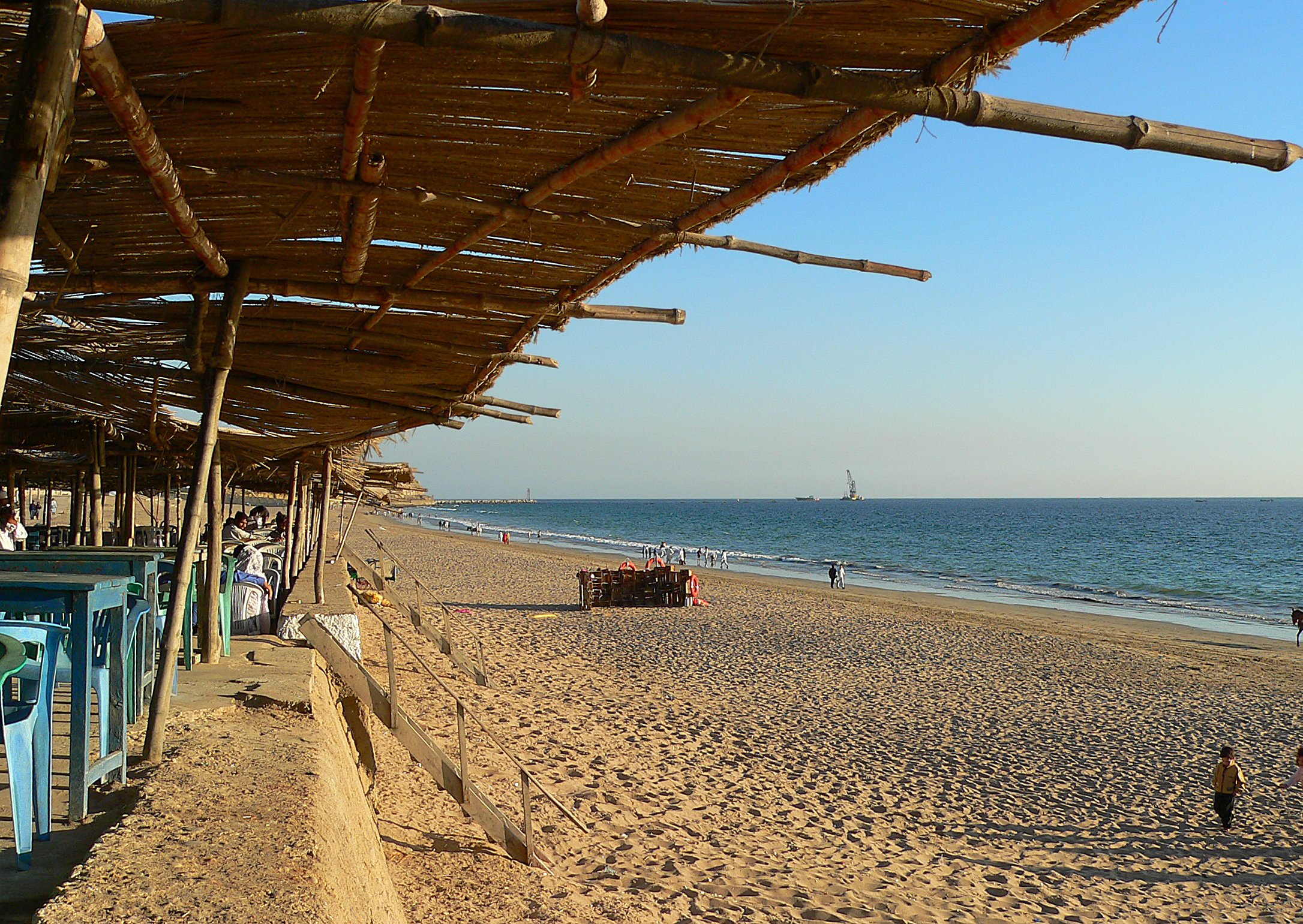
Peninsula of Manora

Sindh is in the western corner of South Asia, bordering the Iranian plateau in the west. Geographically it is the third largest province of Pakistan, stretching about 579 kilometres (360 mi) from north to south and 442 kilometres (275 mi) (extreme) or 281 kilometres (175 mi) (average) from east to west, with an area of 140,915 square kilometres (54,408 sq mi) of Pakistani territory. Sindh is bounded by the Thar Desert to the east, the Kirthar Mountains to the west and the Arabian Sea and Rann of Kutch to the south. In the centre is a fertile plain along the Indus River.

Sindh is divided into three main geographical regions: Siro (Region) ("upper country"), aka Upper Sindh, which is above Sehwan, Vicholo ("middle country"), or Middle Sindh, from Sehwan to Hyderabad, and Lāṟu or Larr ("sloping, descending country"), or Lower Sindh, mostly consisting of the Indus Delta below Hyderabad.

=== Flora ===
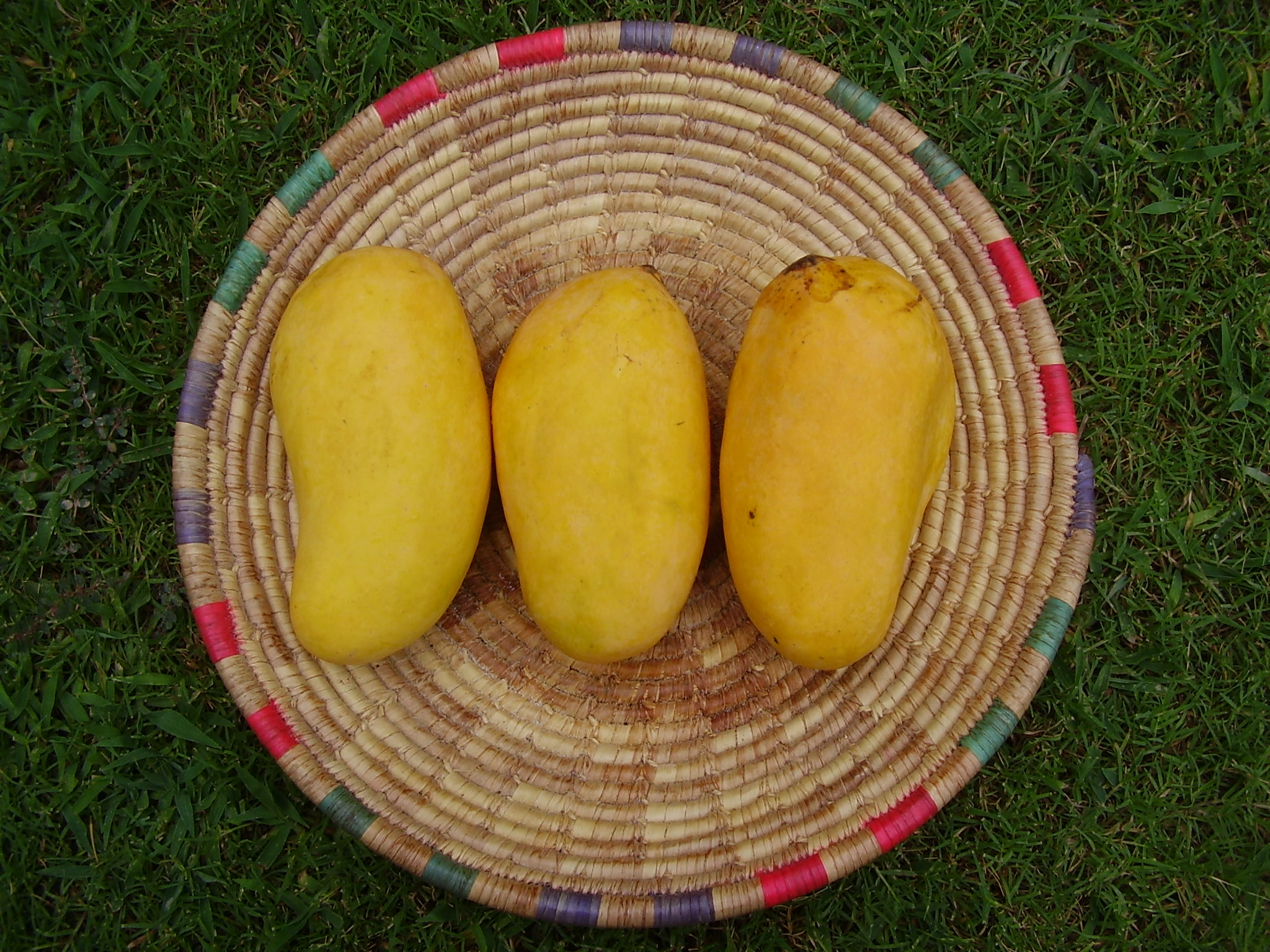
Sindhri is among top 10 mango varieties in the world.

The province is mostly arid with scant vegetation except for the irrigated Indus Valley. The dwarf palm, Acacia rupestris (kher), and Tecomella undulata (lohirro) trees are typical of the western hill region. In the Indus valley, the Acacia nilotica (babul) (babbur) is the most dominant and occurs in thick forests along the Indus banks. The Azadirachta indica (neem) (nim), Zizyphys vulgaris (bir) (ber), Tamarix orientalis (jujuba lai) and Capparis aphylla (kirir) are among the more common trees.

Mango, date palms and the more recently introduced banana, guava, orange and chiku are the typical fruit-bearing trees. The coastal strip and the creeks abound in semi-aquatic and aquatic plants and the inshore Indus delta islands have forests of Avicennia tomentosa (timmer) and Ceriops candolleana (chaunir) trees. Water lilies grow in abundance in the numerous lakes and ponds, particularly in the lower Sindh region.

=== Fauna ===
Among the wild animals, the Sindh ibex (sareh), blackbuck, wild sheep (Urial or gadh) and wild bear are found in the western rocky range. The leopard is now rare and the Asiatic cheetah extinct. The Pirrang (large tiger cat or fishing cat) of the eastern desert region is also disappearing. Deer occur in the lower rocky plains and in the eastern region, as do the Striped hyena (charakh), jackal, fox, porcupine, common gray mongoose and hedgehog. The Sindhi phekari, red lynx or Caracal cat, is found in some areas. Phartho (hog deer) and wild bear occur, particularly in the central inundation belt. There are bats, lizards and reptiles, including the cobra, lundi (viper) and the mysterious Sindh krait of the Thar region, which is supposed to suck the victim's breath in his sleep. Some unusual sightings of Asian cheetah occurred in 2003 near the Balochistan border in Kirthar Mountains. The rare Houbara bustard finds Sindh's warm climate suitable to rest and mate. Unfortunately, it is hunted by locals and foreigners.

Crocodiles are rare and inhabit only the backwaters of the Indus, eastern Nara channel and Karachi backwater. Besides a large variety of marine fish, the plumbeous dolphin, the beaked dolphin, rorqual or blue whale and skates frequent the seas along the Sindh coast. The Pallo (Sable fish), a marine fish, ascends the Indus annually from February to April to spawn. The Indus river dolphin is among the most endangered species in Pakistan and is found in the part of the Indus river in northern Sindh. Hog deer and wild bear occur, particularly in the central inundation belt.

Although Sindh has a semi arid climate, through its coastal and riverine forests, its huge fresh water lakes and mountains and deserts, Sindh supports a large amount of varied wildlife. Due to the semi-arid climate of Sindh the left out forests support an average population of jackals and snakes. The national parks established by the Government of Pakistan in collaboration with many organizations such as World Wide Fund for Nature and Sindh Wildlife Department support a huge variety of animals and birds. The Kirthar National Park in the Kirthar range spreads over more than 3000 km^{2} of desert, stunted tree forests and a lake. The KNP supports Sindh ibex, wild sheep (urial) and black bear along with the rare leopard. There are also occasional sightings of The Sindhi phekari, ped lynx or Caracal cat. There is a project to introduce tigers and Asian elephants too in KNP near the huge Hub Dam Lake. Between July and November when the monsoon winds blow onshore from the ocean, giant olive ridley turtles lay their eggs along the seaward side. The turtles are protected species. After the mothers lay and leave them buried under the sands the SWD and WWF officials take the eggs and protect them until they are hatched to keep them from predators.

=== Climate ===
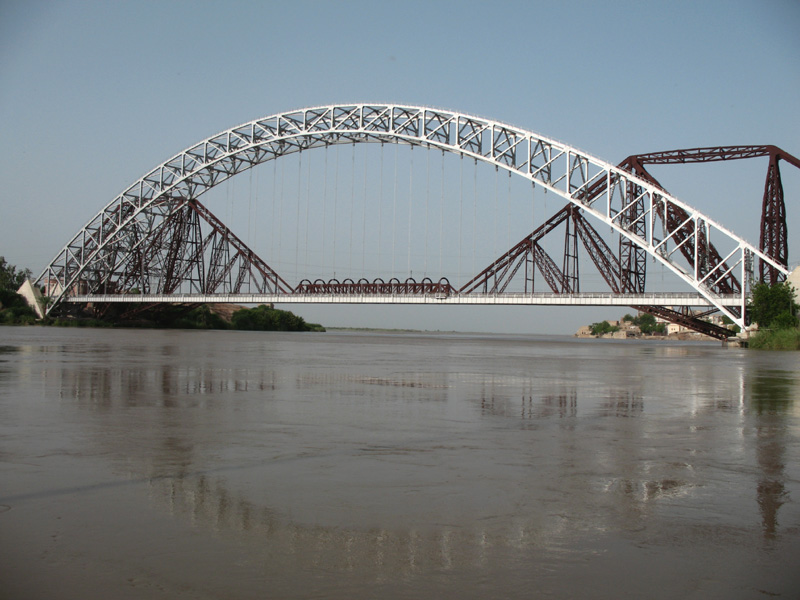
Lansdowne Railway Bridge

Sindh lies in a tropical to subtropical region; it is hot in the summer and mild to warm in winter. Temperatures frequently rise above 46 °C (115 °F) between May and August, and the minimum average temperature of 2 °C (36 °F) occurs during December and January in the northern and higher elevated regions. The annual rainfall averages about seven inches, falling mainly during July and August. The southwest monsoon wind begins in mid-February and continues until the end of September, whereas the cool northerly wind blows during the winter months from October to January.

Sindh lies between the two monsoons—the southwest monsoon from the Indian Ocean and the northeast or retreating monsoon, deflected towards it by the Himalayan mountains—and escapes the influence of both. The region's scarcity of rainfall is compensated by the inundation of the Indus twice a year, caused by the spring and summer melting of Himalayan snow and by rainfall in the monsoon season.

Sindh is divided into three climatic regions: Siro (the upper region, centred on Jacobabad), Wicholo (the middle region, centred on Hyderabad), and Lar (the lower region, centred on Karachi). The thermal equator passes through upper Sindh, where the air is generally very dry. Central Sindh's temperatures are generally lower than those of upper Sindh but higher than those of lower Sindh. Dry hot days and cool nights are typical during the summer. Central Sindh's maximum temperature typically reaches 43–44 °C (109–111 °F). Lower Sindh has a damper and humid maritime climate affected by the southwestern winds in summer and northeastern winds in winter, with lower rainfall than Central Sindh. Lower Sindh's maximum temperature reaches about 35–38 °C (95–100 °F). In the Kirthar range at 1,800 m (5,900 ft) and higher at Gorakh Hill and other peaks in Dadu District, temperatures near freezing have been recorded and brief snowfall is received in the winters.

== Major cities ==
List of major cities in Sindh
| Rank | City | District(s) | Population | Image |
|---|---|---|---|---|
| 1 | Karachi | Nazimabad, Orangi, Gulshan, Korangi, Malir, Keamari, Karachi | 18,843,844 | |
| 2 | Hyderabad | Hyderabad | 1,921,275 | |
| 3 | Sukkur | Sukkur | 563,851 | |
| 4 | Larkana | Larkana | 551,716 | |
| 5 | Benazirabad | Shaheed Benazirabad | 363,138 | |
| 6 | Mirpur Khas | Mirpur Khas | 267,833 | |
| 9 | Jacobabad | Jacobabad | 219,315 | |
| 8 | Shikarpur | Shikarpur | 204,938 | Clock Tower Shikarpur |
| 9 | Khairpur | Khairpur | 191,044 | |
| 10 | Dadu | Dadu | 188,317 | |
| 11 | Tando Adam Khan | Sanghar | 174,291 | |
| 12 | Tando Allahyar | Tando Allahyar | 171,185 | |
| 13 | Umerkot | Umerkot | 144,558 | |
| 14 | Moro | Naushahro Feroze | 142,685 | |
| 15 | Shahdadkot | Qambar Shahdadkot | 120,687 | |
Source: Pakistan Census 2023
This is a list of city proper populations and does not indicate metro populations.

== Government ==
=== Sindh province ===
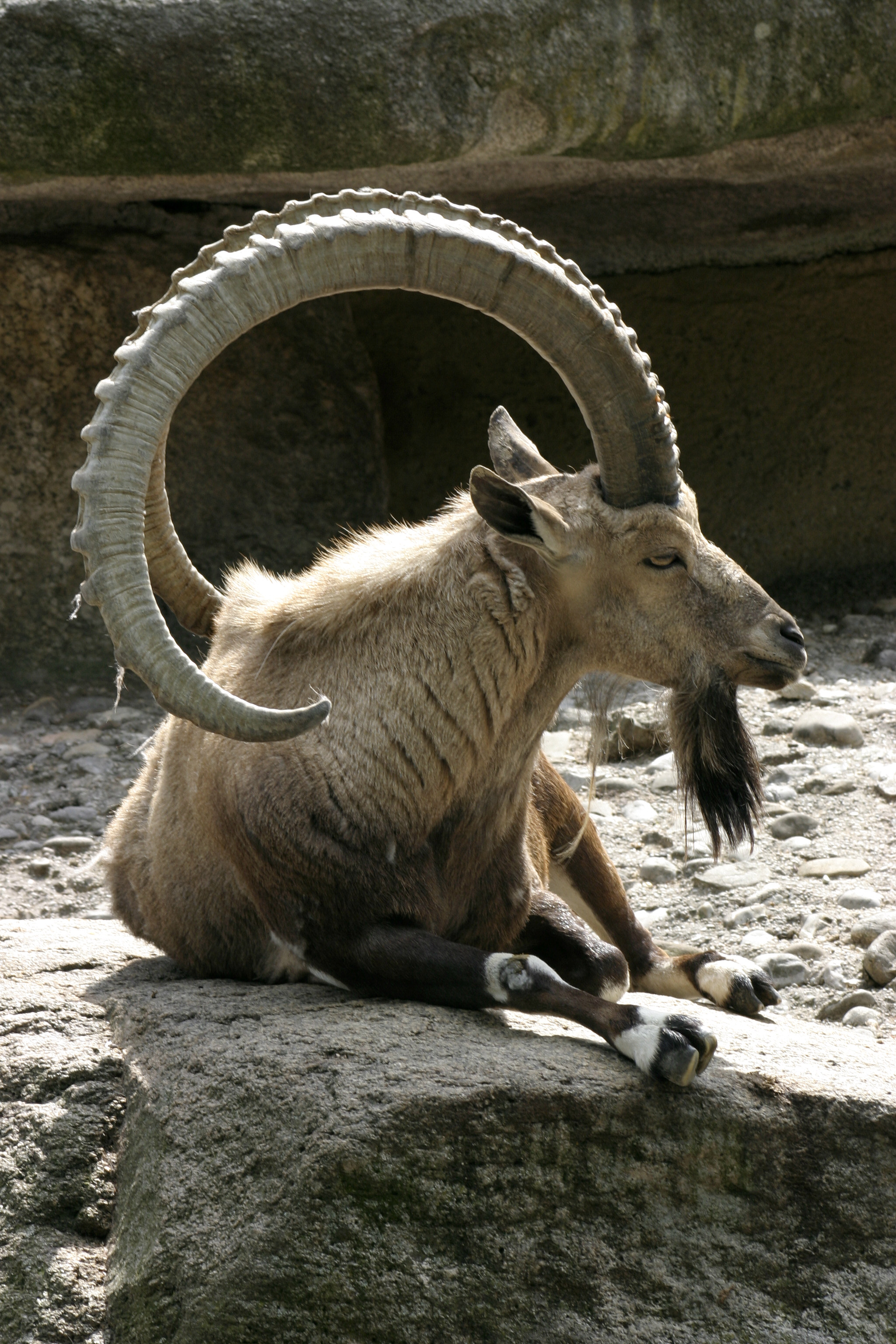
Sindh ibex, the provincial animal

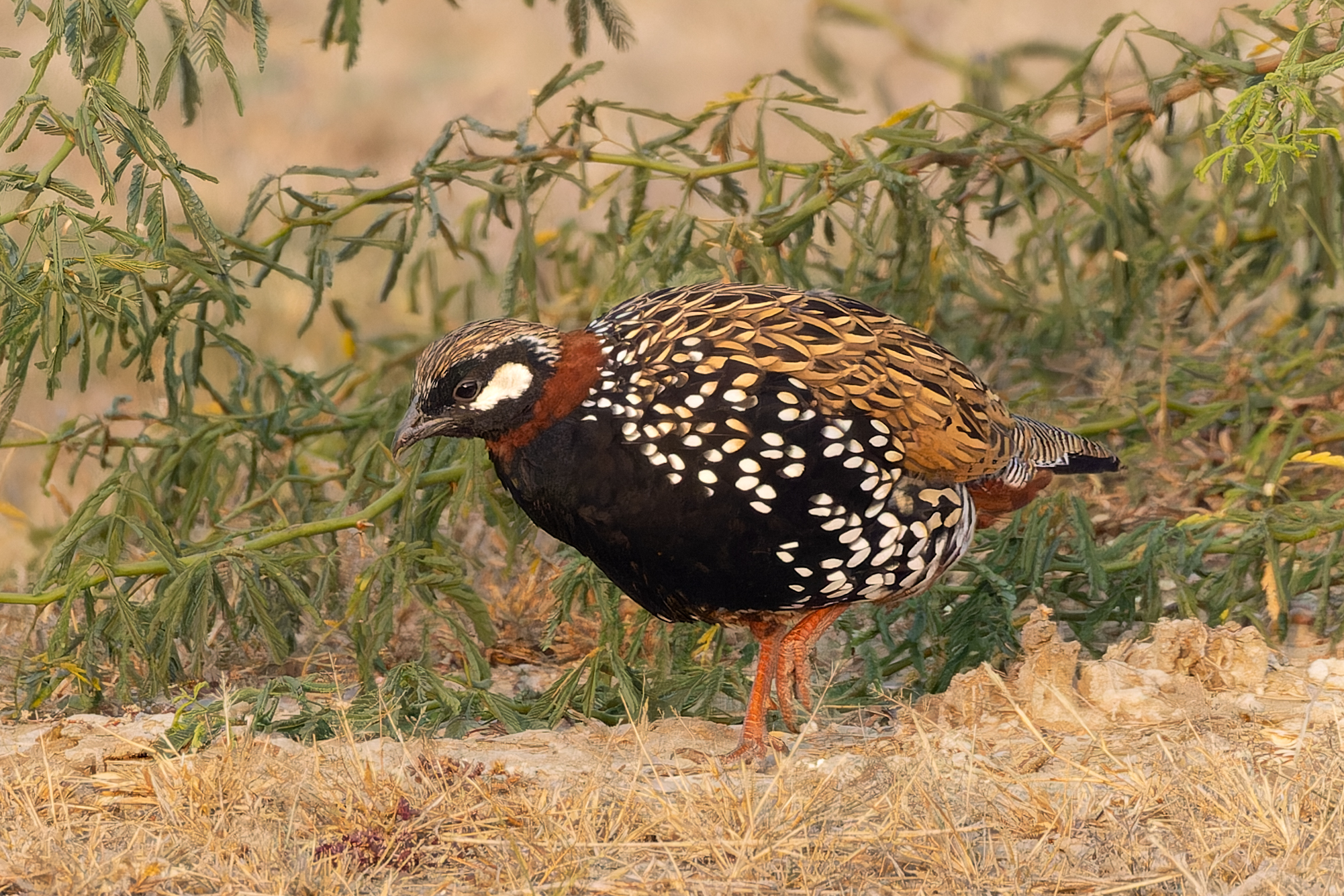
Black partridge, the provincial bird

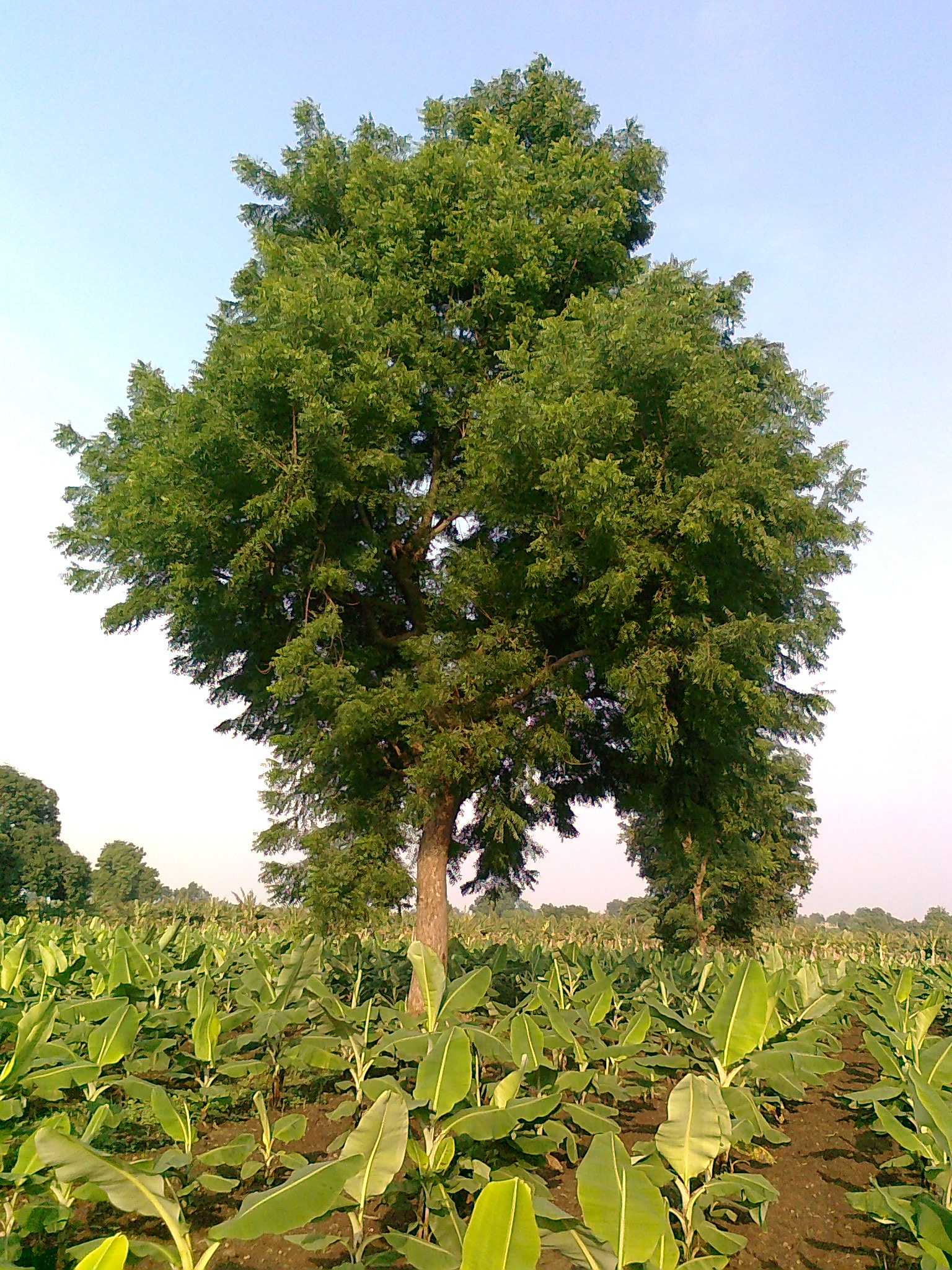
Neem Tree, the provincial tree

The Provincial Assembly of Sindh is a unicameral and consists of 168 seats, of which 5% are reserved for non-Muslims and 17% for women. The provincial capital of Sindh is Karachi. The provincial government is led by Chief Minister who is directly elected by the popular and landslide votes; the Governor serves as a ceremonial representative nominated and appointed by the President of Pakistan. The administrative boss of the province who is in charge of the bureaucracy is the Chief Secretary Sindh, who is appointed by the Prime Minister of Pakistan. Most of the influential Sindhi tribes in the province are involved in Pakistan's politics.

In addition, Sindh's politics leans towards the left-wing and its political culture serves as a dominant place for the left-wing spectrum in the country. The province's trend towards the Pakistan Peoples Party (PPP) and away from the Pakistan Muslim League (N) can be seen in nationwide general elections, in which Sindh is a stronghold of the PPP. The PML(N) has a limited support due to its centre-right agenda.

In metropolitan cities such as Karachi and Hyderabad, the MQM (another party of the left with the support of Muhajirs) has a considerable vote bank and support. Minor leftist parties such as the People's Movement also found support in rural areas of the province.

=== Divisions ===
In 2008, after the public elections, the new government decided to restore the structure of Divisions of all provinces. In Sindh after the lapse of the Local Governments Bodies term in 2010 the Divisional Commissioners system was to be restored.

In July 2011, following excessive violence in the city of Karachi and after the political split between the ruling PPP and the majority party in Sindh, the MQM and after the resignation of the MQM Governor of Sindh, PPP and the Government of Sindh decided to restore the commissionerate system in the province. As a consequence, the five divisions of Sindh were restored – namely Karachi, Hyderabad, Sukkur, Mirpurkhas and Larkana with their respective districts. Subsequently, a new division was added in Sindh, the Nawab Shah/Shaheed Benazirabad division.

| Name | Headquarter | Districts | Area (km^{2}) | Population (2023) | Pop. Density (2023) | Literacy rate (2023) | Map |
|---|---|---|---|---|---|---|---|
| Hyderabad Division | Hyderabad | Dadu District; Hyderabad; Jamshoro District; Matiari District; Tando Allahyar District; Tando Muhammad Khan District; Badin District; Sujawal District; Thatta District | 48,670 | 11,659,246 | 239.56/km^{2} | 45.38% | |
| Karachi Division | Karachi | Central; East; South; West; Korangi; Malir; Kemari | 3,527 | 20,382,881 | 5,779.10/km^{2} | 75.11% | |
| Larkana Division | Larkana | Jacobabad District; Kashmore District; Larkana District; Qambar Shahdadkot District; Shikarpur District | 15,213 | 7,093,706 | 466.29/km^{2} | 44.53% | |
| Mirpur Khas Division | Mirpur Khas | Mirpur Khas District; Tharparkar District; Umerkot District | 28,170 | 4,619,624 | 153.99/km^{2} | 40.41% | |
| Shaheed Benazirabad Division | Nawabshah | Naushahro Feroze District; Shaheed Benazir Abad District; Sanghar District | 18,176 | 5,930,649 | 326.29/km^{2} | 49.91% | |
| Sukkur Division | Sukkur | Ghotki District; Khairpur District; Sukkur District | 27,158 | 6,010,041 | 221.30/km^{2} | 59.72% | |

=== Districts ===

| Sr. No. | District | Headquarters | Area (km^{2}) | Population (in 2023) | Density (people/km^{2}) | Division |
|---|---|---|---|---|---|---|
| 1 | Badin | Badin | 6,858 | 1,947,081 | 285 | Hyderabad |
| 2 | Dadu | Dadu | 7,866 | 1,742,320 | 222 | Hyderabad |
| 3 | Ghotki | Mirpur Mathelo | 6,083 | 1,772,609 | 291 | Sukkur |
| 4 | Hyderabad | Hyderabad | 993 | 2,432,540 | 2,449 | Hyderabad |
| 5 | Jacobabad | Jacobabad | 2,698 | 1,174,097 | 434 | Larkana |
| 6 | Jamshoro | Jamshoro | 11,204 | 1,117,308 | 100 | Hyderabad |
| 7 | Karachi Central | North Nazimabad | 69 | 3,822,325 | 55,839 | Karachi |
| 7 | Karachi East | Gulshan e Iqbal | 139 | 3,921,742 | 28,220 | Karachi |
| 7 | Karachi South | Saddar Karachi | 122 | 2,329,764 | 19,105 | Karachi |
| 7 | Karachi West | Orangi Town | 370 | 2,679,380 | 7,238 | Karachi |
| 7 | Korangi | Korangi | 108 | 3,128,971 | 28,969 | Karachi |
| 7 | Keamari | Moriro Mirbahar | 559 | 2,068,451 | 3,700 | Karachi |
| 7 | Malir | Malir | 2,160 | 2,432,248 | 1,127 | Karachi |
| 8 | Kashmore | Kandhkot | 2,580 | 1,233,957 | 477 | Larkana |
| 9 | Khairpur | Khairpur | 15,910 | 2,597,535 | 163 | Sukkur |
| 10 | Larkana | Larkana | 1,948 | 1,784,453 | 916 | Larkana |
| 11 | Matiari | Matiari | 1,417 | 849,383 | 599 | Hyderabad |
| 12 | Mirpur Khas | Mirpur Khas | 2,925 | 1,681,386 | 575 | Mirpur Khas |
| 13 | Naushahro Feroze | Naushahro Feroze | 2,945 | 1,777,082 | 603 | Shaheed Benazir Abad |
| 14 | Shaheed Benazirabad | Nawabshah | 4,502 | 1,845,102 | 410 | Shaheed Benazir Abad |
| 15 | Qambar Shahdadkot | Qambar | 5,475 | 1,514,869 | 276 | Larkana |
| 16 | Sanghar | Sanghar | 10,728 | 2,308,465 | 215 | Mirpur Khas |
| 17 | Shikarpur | Shikarpur | 2,512 | 1,386,330 | 552 | Larkana |
| 18 | Sukkur | Sukkur | 5,165 | 1,639,897 | 318 | Sukkur |
| 19 | Tando Allahyar | Tando Allahyar | 1,554 | 922,012 | 593 | Hyderabad |
| 20 | Tando Muhammad Khan | Tando Muhammad Khan | 1,423 | 726,119 | 509 | Hyderabad |
| 21 | Tharparkar | Mithi | 19,637 | 1,778,407 | 91 | Mirpur Khas |
| 22 | Thatta | Thatta | 8,570 | 1,083,191 | 127 | Hyderabad |
| 22 | Sujawal | Sujawal | 8,785 | 839,292 | 96 | Hyderabad |
| 23 | Umerkot | Umerkot | 5,608 | 1,159,831 | 207 | Mirpur Khas |

=== Tehsils ===
In Sindh, talukas are equivalent to the tehsils used elsewhere in the country.

| Tehsil | Area (km²) | Population (2023) | Density (ppl/km²) (2023) | Districts | Divisions |
|---|---|---|---|---|---|
| Badin Tehsil | 1,816 | 490,386 | 270.04 | Badin District | Hyderabad Division |
| Matli Tehsil | 1,143 | 471,100 | 412.16 | Badin District | Hyderabad Division |
| Shaheed Fazil Rahu Tehsil | 1,642 | 374,854 | 228.29 | Badin District | Hyderabad Division |
| Talhar Tehsil | 569 | 184,206 | 323.74 | Badin District | Hyderabad Division |
| Tando Bago Tehsil | 1,688 | 426,535 | 252.69 | Badin District | Hyderabad Division |
| Jati Tehsil | 3,489 | 214,710 | 61.54 | Sujawal District | Hyderabad Division |
| Kharo Chan Tehsil | 778 | 11,403 | 14.66 | Sujawal District | Hyderabad Division |
| Mirpur Bathoro Tehsil | 698 | 231,735 | 332 | Sujawal District | Hyderabad Division |
| Shah Bandar Tehsil | 3,074 | 168,911 | 54.95 | Sujawal District | Hyderabad Division |
| Sujawal Tehsil | 746 | 212,533 | 284.90 | Sujawal District | Hyderabad Division |
| Ghorabari Tehsil | 1,018 | 198,920 | 195.40 | Thatta District | Hyderabad Division |
| Keti Bunder | 771 | 63,217 | 81.99 | Thatta District | Hyderabad Division |
| Mirpur Sakro Tehsil | 2,958 | 376,078 | 127.14 | Thatta District | Hyderabad Division |
| Thatta Tehsil | 3,823 | 444,976 | 116.39 | Thatta District | Hyderabad Division |
| Dadu Tehsil | 846 | 508,607 | 601.19 | Dadu District | Hyderabad Division |
| Johi Tehsil | 3,509 | 333,179 | 94.95 | Dadu District | Hyderabad Division |
| Khairpur Nathan Shah Tehsil | 2,583 | 379,975 | 147.11 | Dadu District | Hyderabad Division |
| Mehar Tehsil | 928 | 520,559 | 560.95 | Dadu District | Hyderabad Division |
| Hyderabad City Tehsil | 43 | 778,132 | 18,096.09 | Hyderabad District | Hyderabad Division |
| Hyderabad Tehsil | 711 | 511,265 | 719.08 | Hyderabad District | Hyderabad Division |
| Latifabad Tehsil | 204 | 800,983 | 3,926.39 | Hyderabad District | Hyderabad Division |
| Qasimabad Tehsil | 35 | 342,160 | 9,776.00 | Hyderabad District | Hyderabad Division |
| Kotri Tehsil | 1,051 | 472,003 | 244.10 | Jamshoro District | Hyderabad Division |
| Sehwan Tehsil | 2,160 | 322,011 | 149.08 | Jamshoro District | Hyderabad Division |
| Manjhand Tehsil | 2,303 | 161,794 | 70.28 | Jamshoro District | Hyderabad Division |
| Thana Bulla Khan Tehsil | 5,690 | 161,500 | 28.39 | Jamshoro District | Hyderabad Division |
| Hala Tehsil | 488 | 286,155 | 586.38 | Matiari District | Hyderabad Division |
| Matiari Tehsil | 568 | 377,945 | 665.40 | Matiari District | Hyderabad Division |
| Saeedabad Tehsil | 361 | 185,283 | 513.25 | Matiari District | Hyderabad Division |
| Chamber Tehsil | 483 | 233,424 | 483.28 | Tando Allahyar District | Hyderabad Division |
| Jhando Mari Tehsil | 626 | 266,665 | 425.98 | Tando Allahyar District | Hyderabad Division |
| Tando Allahyar Tehsil | 445 | 421,923 | 948.14 | Tando Allahyar District | Hyderabad Division |
| Bulri Shah Karim Tehsil | 770 | 247,027 | 320.81 | Tando Muhammad Khan District | Hyderabad Division |
| Tando Ghulam Hyder Tehsil | 390 | 206,665 | 529.91 | Tando Muhammad Khan District | Hyderabad Division |
| Tando Muhammad Khan Tehsil | 263 | 272,427 | 1,035.84 | Tando Muhammad Khan District | Hyderabad Division |
| Gulberg Town | 14 | 613,724 | 43,837.43 | Karachi Central District | Karachi Division |
| Liaquatabad Town | 6 | 547,706 | 91,284.33 | Karachi Central District | Karachi Division |
| New Karachi Town | 18 | 1,165,742 | 64,763.44 | Karachi Central District | Karachi Division |
| North Nazimabad Town | 23 | 922,413 | 40,104.91 | Karachi Central District | Karachi Division |
| Nazimabad | 8 | 572,740 | 71,592.50 | Karachi Central District | Karachi Division |
| Jamshed Town | 11 | 656,014 | 59,637.64 | Karachi East District | Karachi Division |
| Ferozabad | 20 | 1,167,692 | 58,384.60 | Karachi East District | Karachi Division |
| Gulshan-e-Iqbal | 29 | 979,502 | 33,775.93 | Karachi East District | Karachi Division |
| Gulzar-e-Hijri | 79 | 1,118,534 | 14,158.66 | Karachi East District | Karachi Division |
| Lyari Town | 6 | 949,878 | 158,313.00 | Karachi South District | Karachi Division |
| Saddar Town | 35 | 159,363 | 4,553.23 | Karachi South District | Karachi Division |
| Aram Bagh | 4 | 237,224 | 59,306.00 | Karachi South District | Karachi Division |
| Civil Line | 73 | 480,480 | 6,581.92 | Karachi South District | Karachi Division |
| Garden | 4 | 502,819 | 125,704.75 | Karachi South District | Karachi Division |
| Orangi Town | 9 | 596,919 | 66,324.33 | Karachi West District | Karachi Division |
| Manghopir | 342 | 1,081,753 | 3,163.02 | Karachi West District | Karachi Division |
| Mominabad | 19 | 1,000,708 | 52,668.84 | Karachi West District | Karachi Division |
| Korangi Town | 59 | 1,363,992 | 23,118.51 | Korangi District | Karachi Division |
| Landhi Town | 19 | 681,294 | 35,857.58 | Korangi District | Karachi Division |
| Shah Faisal Town | 21 | 641,894 | 30,566.38 | Korangi District | Karachi Division |
| Model Colony | 9 | 441,791 | 49,087.89 | Korangi District | Karachi Division |
| Bin Qasim | 447 | 322,915 | 722.40 | Malir District | Karachi Division |
| Gadap Town | 1,104 | 100,351 | 90.90 | Malir District | Karachi Division |
| Airport | 41 | 254,370 | 6,204.15 | Malir District | Karachi Division |
| Ibrahim Hyderi | 97 | 1,341,638 | 13,831.32 | Malir District | Karachi Division |
| Murad Memon Goth | 195 | 376,987 | 1,933.27 | Malir District | Karachi Division |
| Shah Mureed | 276 | 35,987 | 130.39 | Malir District | Karachi Division |
| Keamari Town | 50 | 451,801 | 9,036.02 | Keamari District | Karachi Division |
| Baldia Town | 34 | 948,597 | 27,899.91 | Keamari District | Karachi Division |
| S.I.T.E. Town | 25 | 449,120 | 17,964.80 | Keamari District | Karachi Division |
| Maripur | 450 | 218,933 | 486.52 | Keamari District | Karachi Division |
| Garhi Khairo Tehsil | 733 | 193,297 | 263.72 | Jacobabad District | Larkana Division |
| Jacobabad Tehsil | 664 | 447,647 | 674.11 | Jacobabad District | Larkana Division |
| Thul Tehsil | 1,301 | 533,153 | 409.81 | Jacobabad District | Larkana Division |
| Kandhkot Tehsil | 654 | 407,592 | 623.23 | Kashmore District | Larkana Division |
| Kashmore Tehsil | 1,262 | 487,601 | 386.37 | Kashmore District | Larkana Division |
| Tangwani Tehsil | 664 | 338,764 | 510.19 | Kashmore District | Larkana Division |
| Bakrani Tehsil | 425 | 275,268 | 647.69 | Larkana District | Larkana Division |
| Dokri Tehsil | 412 | 257,394 | 624.74 | Larkana District | Larkana Division |
| Larkana Tehsil | 549 | 873,868 | 1,591.74 | Larkana District | Larkana Division |
| Ratodero Tehsil | 562 | 377,923 | 672.46 | Larkana District | Larkana Division |
| Mirokhan Tehsil | 374 | 182,461 | 487.92 | Qambar Shahdadkot District | Larkana Division |
| Nasirabad Tehsil | 309 | 174,708 | 565.47 | Qambar Shahdadkot District | Larkana Division |
| Qambar Tehsil | 2,260 | 448,990 | 198.67 | Qambar Shahdadkot District | Larkana Division |
| Qubo Saeed Khan Tehsil | 1,033 | 99,308 | 96.13 | Qambar Shahdadkot District | Larkana Division |
| Shahdadkot Tehsil | 419 | 225,086 | 537.53 | Qambar Shahdadkot District | Larkana Division |
| Sijawal Junejo Tehsil | 385 | 130,635 | 339.31 | Qambar Shahdadkot District | Larkana Division |
| Warah Tehsil | 695 | 253,681 | 365.01 | Qambar Shahdadkot District | Larkana Division |
| Garhi Yasin Tehsil | 971 | 333,289 | 343.24 | Shikarpur District | Larkana Division |
| Khanpur Tehsil | 629 | 331,219 | 526.58 | Shikarpur District | Larkana Division |
| Lakhi Tehsil | 351 | 300,490 | 856.10 | Shikarpur District | Larkana Division |
| Shikarpur Tehsil | 561 | 421,332 | 751.04 | Shikarpur District | Larkana Division |
| Daharki Tehsil | 2,088 | 335,145 | 160.51 | Ghotki District | Sukkur Division |
| Ghotki Tehsil | 763 | 540,939 | 708.96 | Ghotki District | Sukkur Division |
| Khan Garh Tehsil (Khanpur) | 1,986 | 162,318 | 81.73 | Ghotki District | Sukkur Division |
| Mirpur Mathelo Tehsil | 593 | 350,647 | 591.31 | Ghotki District | Sukkur Division |
| Ubauro Tehsil | 653 | 383,560 | 587.38 | Ghotki District | Sukkur Division |
| Faiz Ganj Tehsil | 946 | 243,254 | 257.14 | Khairpur District | Sukkur Division |
| Gambat Tehsil | 582 | 286,129 | 491.63 | Khairpur District | Sukkur Division |
| Khairpur Tehsil | 585 | 465,233 | 795.27 | Khairpur District | Sukkur Division |
| Kingri Tehsil | 531 | 370,304 | 697.37 | Khairpur District | Sukkur Division |
| Kot Diji Tehsil | 520 | 385,872 | 742.06 | Khairpur District | Sukkur Division |
| Nara Tehsil | 11,611 | 173,968 | 14.98 | Khairpur District | Sukkur Division |
| Sobho Dero Tehsil | 504 | 293,160 | 581.67 | Khairpur District | Sukkur Division |
| Thari Mirwah Tehsil | 631 | 379,615 | 601.61 | Khairpur District | Sukkur Division |
| New Sukkur Tehsil | 109 | 356,473 | 3,270.39 | Sukkur District | Sukkur Division |
| Pano Akil Tehsil | 1,042 | 457,078 | 438.65 | Sukkur District | Sukkur Division |
| Rohri Tehsil | 807 | 421,500 | 522.30 | Sukkur District | Sukkur Division |
| Salehpat Tehsil | 2,957 | 137,738 | 46.58 | Sukkur District | Sukkur Division |
| Sukkur Tehsil | 250 | 267,108 | 1,068.43 | Sukkur District | Sukkur Division |
| Bhiria Tehsil | 488 | 330,308 | 676.86 | Naushahro Feroze District | Shaheed Benazirabad Division |
| Kandiaro Tehsil | 771 | 356,506 | 462.39 | Naushahro Feroze District | Shaheed Benazirabad Division |
| Mehrabpur Tehsil | 361 | 273,764 | 758.35 | Naushahro Feroze District | Shaheed Benazirabad Division |
| Moro Tehsil | 609 | 408,148 | 670.19 | Naushahro Feroze District | Shaheed Benazirabad Division |
| Naushahro Feroze Tehsil | 717 | 408,356 | 569.53 | Naushahro Feroze District | Shaheed Benazirabad Division |
| Kazi Ahmed Tehsil | 972 | 402,834 | 414.44 | Shaheed Benazirabad District | Shaheed Benazirabad Division |
| Daur Tehsil (2004) | 2,210 | 532,621 | 241.00 | Shaheed Benazirabad District | Shaheed Benazirabad Division |
| Nawabshah Tehsil (1907) | 435 | 481,978 | 1,108.00 | Shaheed Benazirabad District | Shaheed Benazirabad Division |
| Sakrand Tehsil (1858) | 885 | 427,669 | 483.24 | Shaheed Benazirabad District | Shaheed Benazirabad Division |
| Jam Nawaz Ali Tehsil | 440 | 171,598 | 390.00 | Sanghar District | Shaheed Benazirabad Division |
| Khipro Tehsil | 5,933 | 366,748 | 61.81 | Sanghar District | Shaheed Benazirabad Division |
| Sanghar Tehsil | 2,118 | 482,560 | 227.84 | Sanghar District | Shaheed Benazirabad Division |
| Shahdadpur Tehsil | 890 | 525,164 | 590.07 | Sanghar District | Shaheed Benazirabad Division |
| Sinjhoro Tehsil | 907 | 354,709 | 391.08 | Sanghar District | Shaheed Benazirabad Division |
| Tando Adam Khan Tehsil | 440 | 407,686 | 926.56 | Sanghar District | Shaheed Benazirabad Division |
| Digri Tehsil | 572 | 234,578 | 410.10 | Mirpur Khas District | Mirpur Khas Division |
| Hussain Bux Mari Tehsil | 209 | 172,143 | 823.70 | Mirpur Khas District | Mirpur Khas Division |
| Jhuddo Tehsil | 363 | 230,285 | 634.39 | Mirpur Khas District | Mirpur Khas Division |
| Kot Ghulam Muhammad Tehsil | 762 | 310,142 | 407.01 | Mirpur Khas District | Mirpur Khas Division |
| Mirpur Khas Tehsil | 24 | 287,802 | 11,991.75 | Mirpur Khas District | Mirpur Khas Division |
| Shujabad Tehsil | 396 | 185,654 | 468.82 | Mirpur Khas District | Mirpur Khas Division |
| Sindhri Tehsil | 599 | 260,782 | 435.36 | Mirpur Khas District | Mirpur Khas Division |
| Chachro Tehsil | 3,386 | 371,769 | 109.80 | Tharparkar District | Mirpur Khas Division |
| Dahli Tehsil | 2,126 | 326,034 | 153.36 | Tharparkar District | Mirpur Khas Division |
| Diplo Tehsil | 2,872 | 163,119 | 56.80 | Tharparkar District | Mirpur Khas Division |
| Kaloi Tehsil | 922 | 129,677 | 140.65 | Tharparkar District | Mirpur Khas Division |
| Islamkot Tehsil | 3,515 | 265,643 | 75.57 | Tharparkar District | Mirpur Khas Division |
| Mithi Tehsil | 2,954 | 239,091 | 80.94 | Tharparkar District | Mirpur Khas Division |
| Nagarparkar Tehsil | 3,862 | 283,074 | 73.30 | Tharparkar District | Mirpur Khas Division |
| Kunri Tehsil | 585 | 237,063 | 405.24 | Umerkot District | Mirpur Khas Division |
| Pithoro Tehsil | 855 | 130,383 | 152.49 | Umerkot District | Mirpur Khas Division |
| Samaro Tehsil | 959 | 184,051 | 191.92 | Umerkot District | Mirpur Khas Division |
| Umerkot Tehsil | 3,209 | 608,334 | 189.57 | Umerkot District | Mirpur Khas Division |

=== Lower-level subdivisions ===
Supervisory tapas correspond to the kanungo circles used elsewhere in the country, tapas correspond with the patwar circles used in other provinces, and dehs are equivalent to the mouzas used elsewhere.

=== Towns and villages ===
- Goth Bozo
- Kashmir Goth
- Khairo Bhatti

== Economy ==
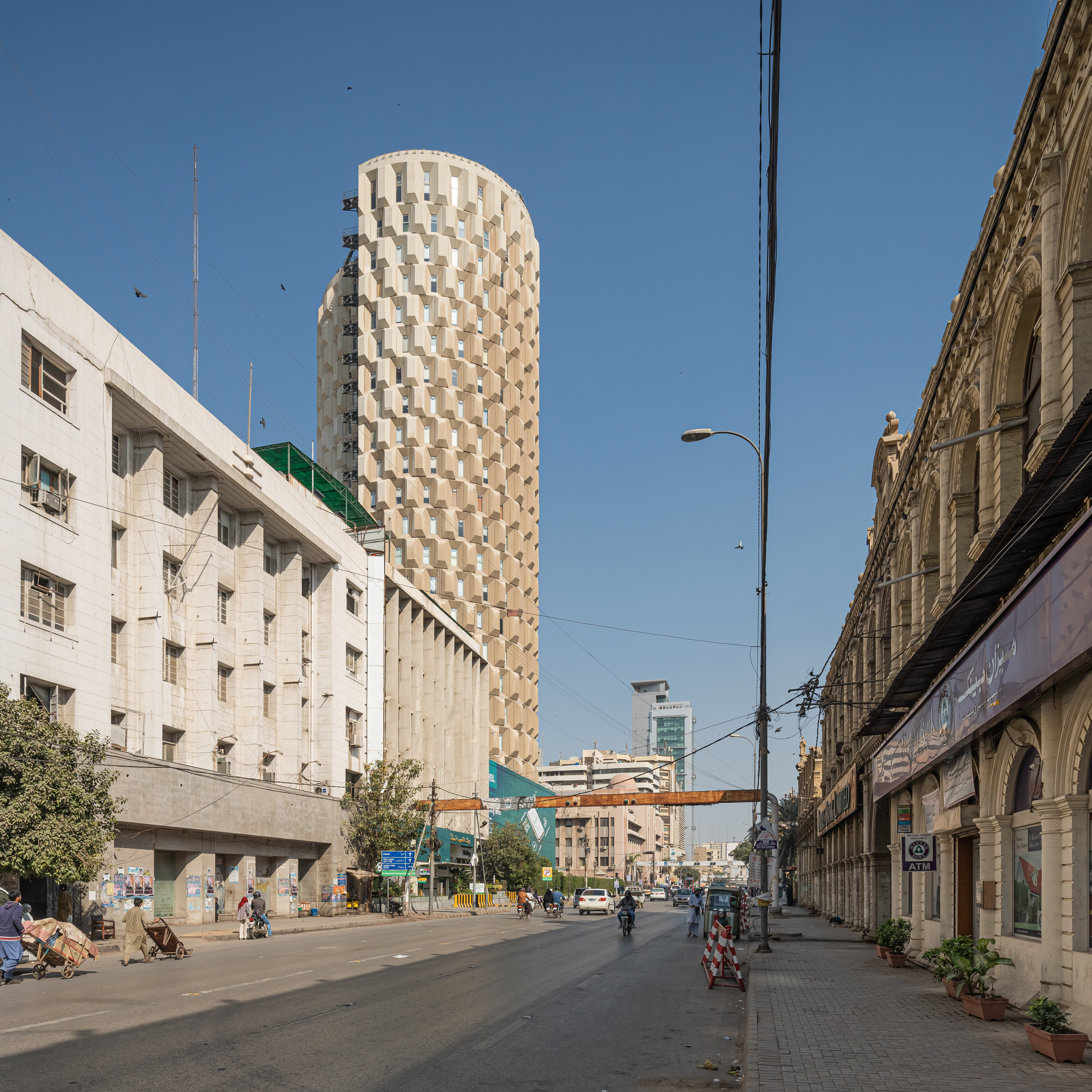
A view of Karachi downtown, the capital of Sindh province

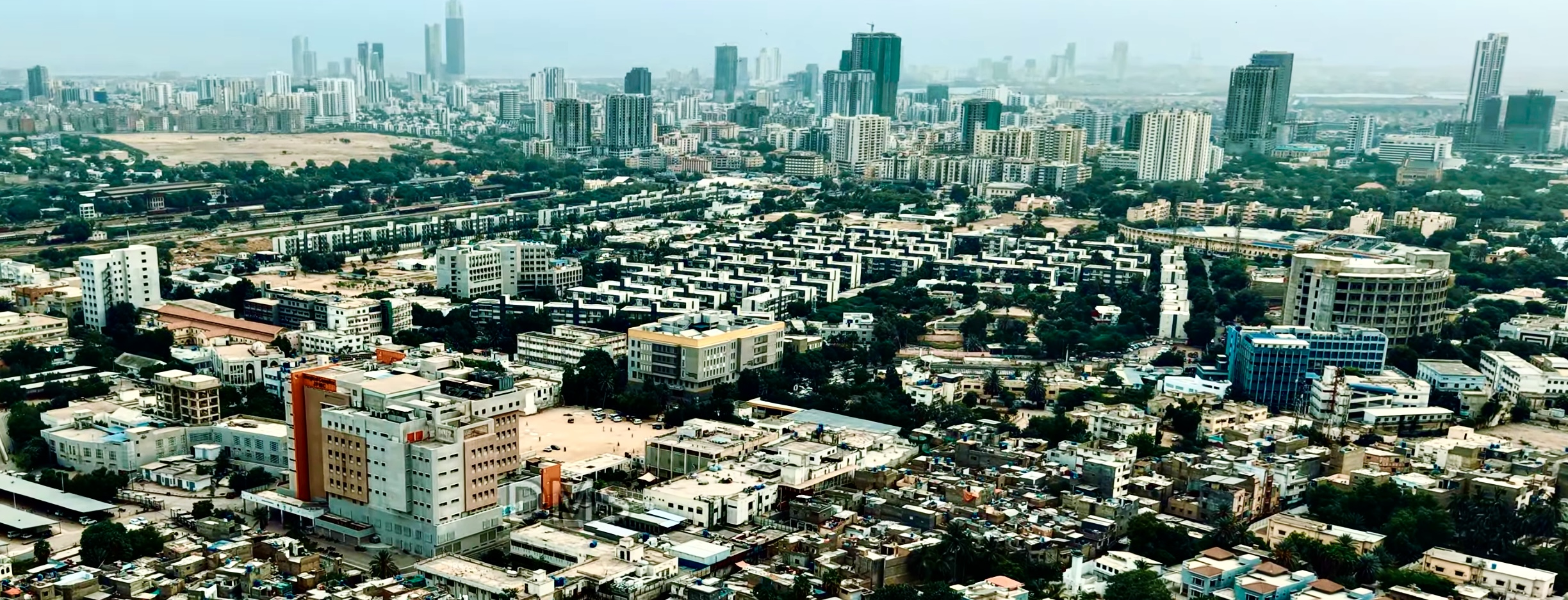
A view of Karachi Skyline, the capital of Sindh province

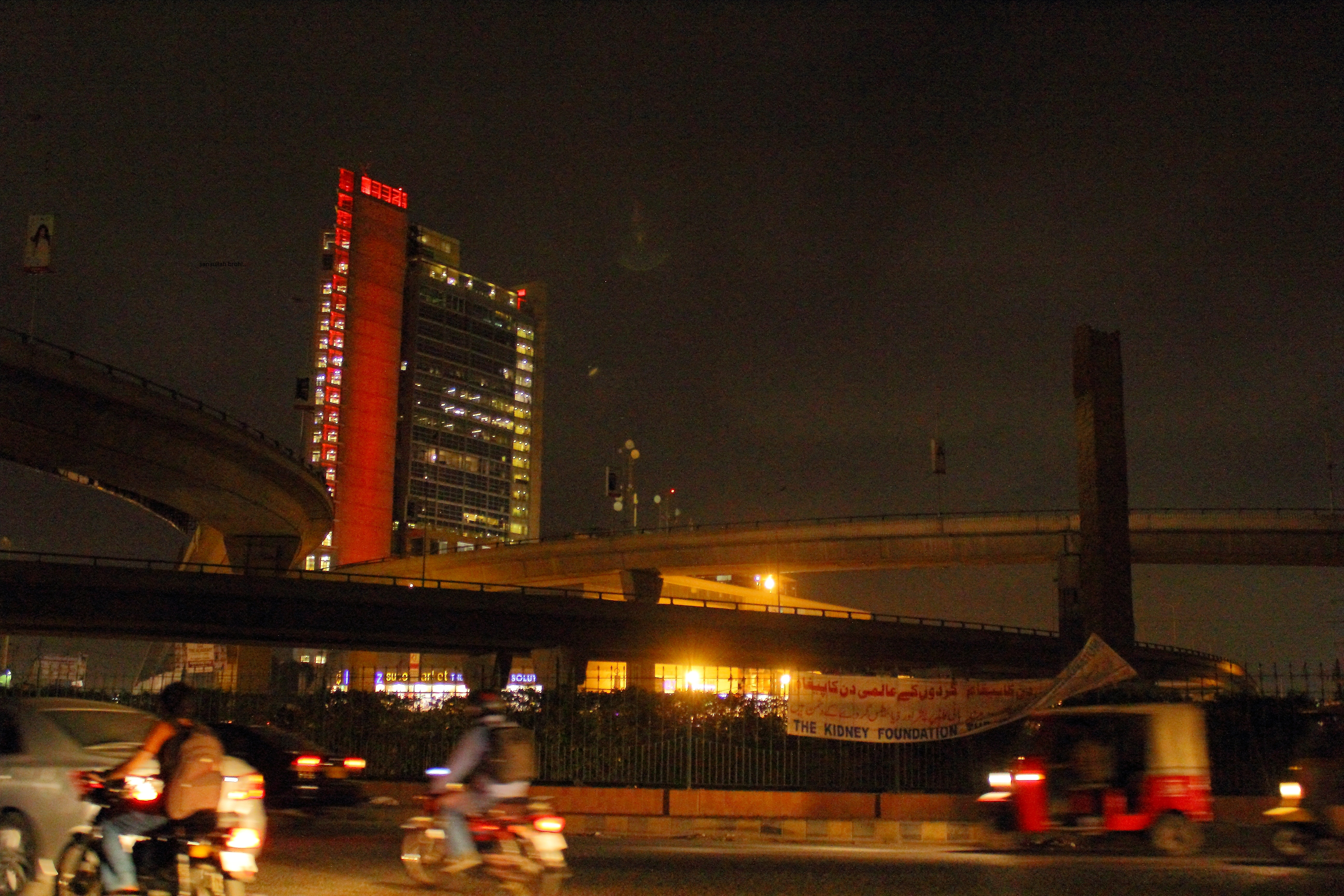
Qayoom Abad Bridge Karachi

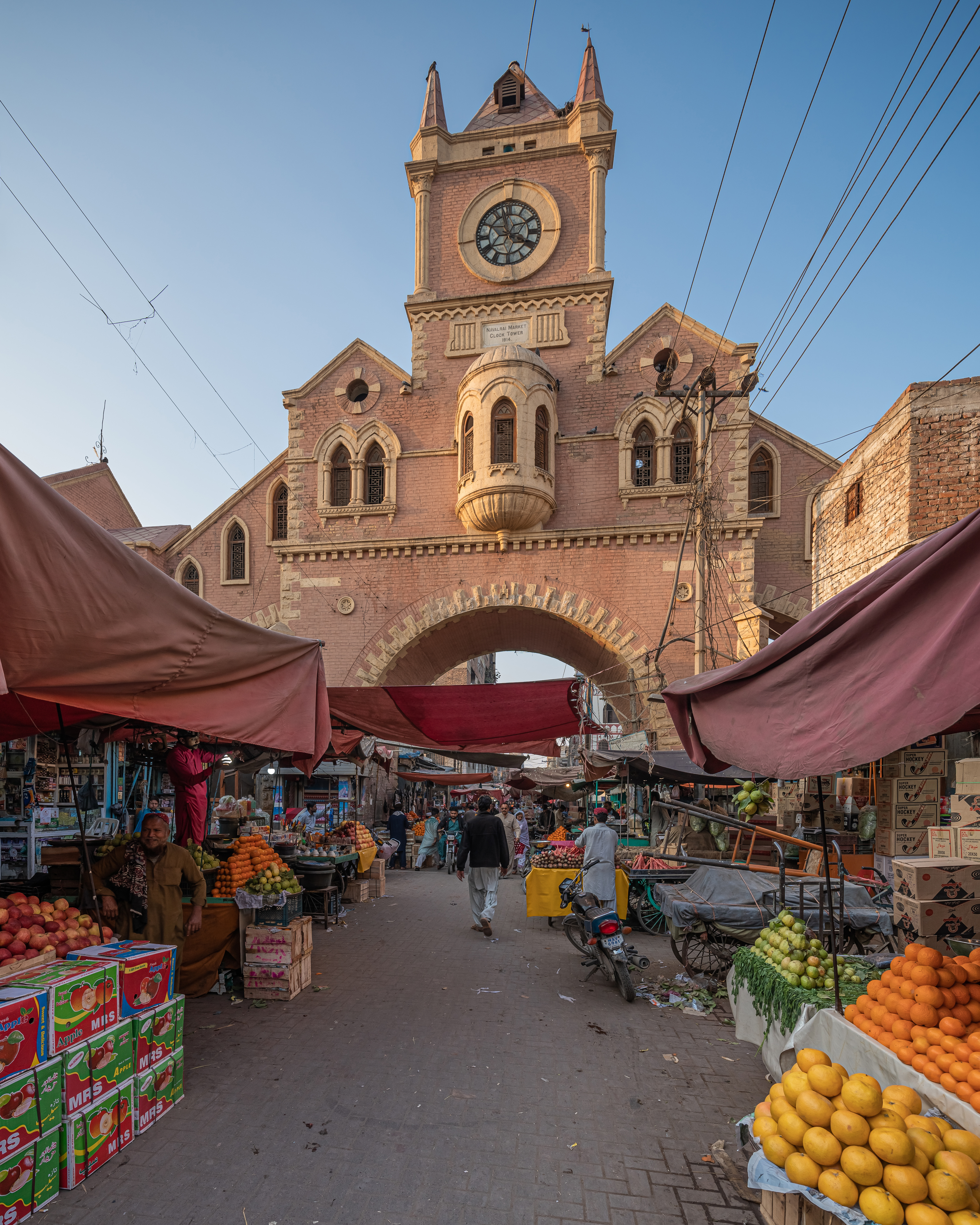
Navalrai Market Clock Tower Hyderabad

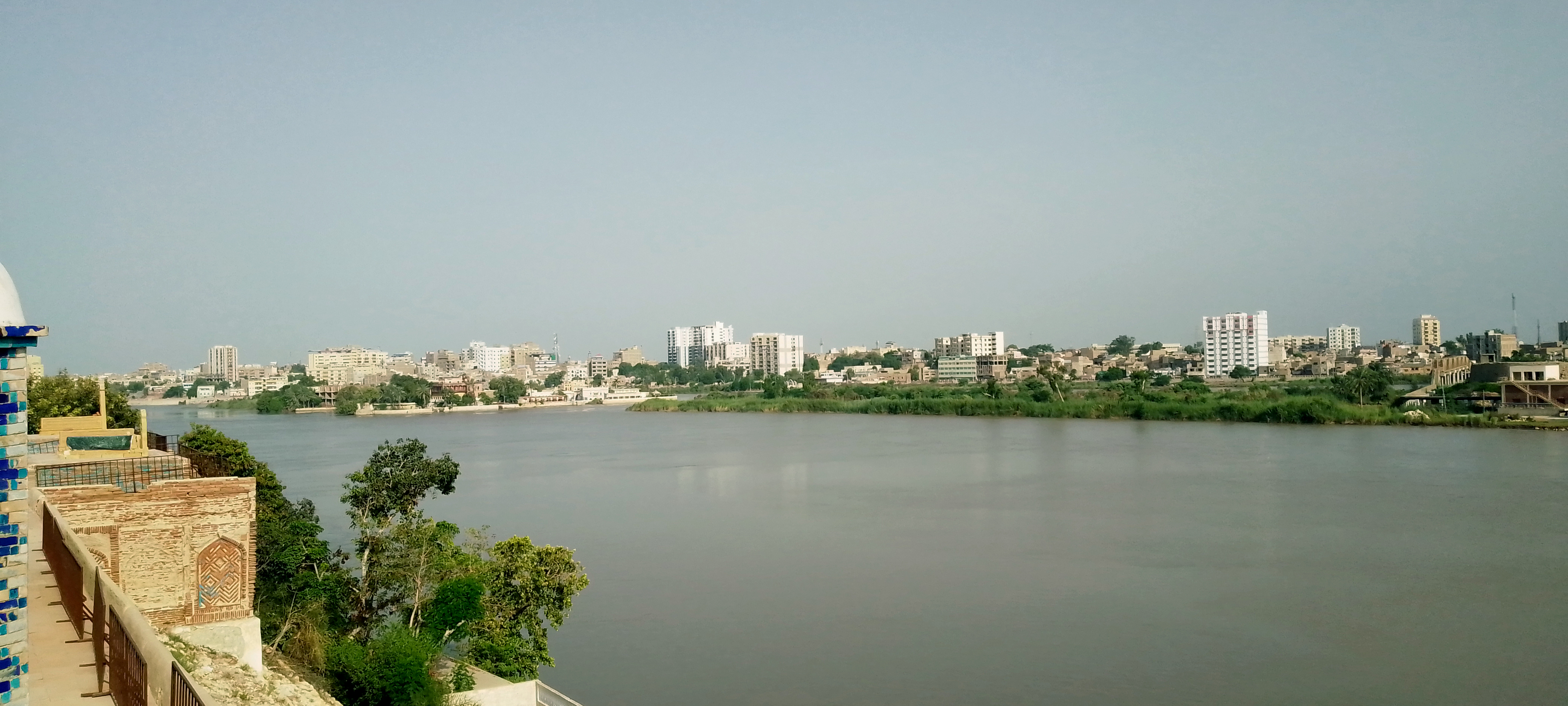
Sukkur skyline along the shores of the River Indus

== Education ==
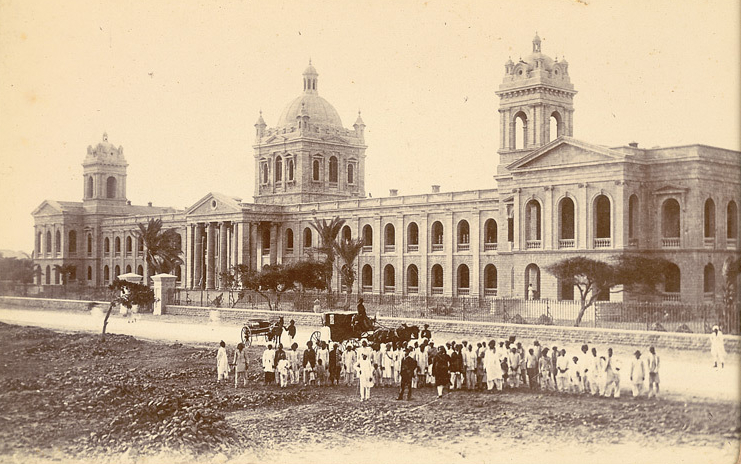
Dayaram Jethmal College (D.J. College), Karachi, in the 19th century

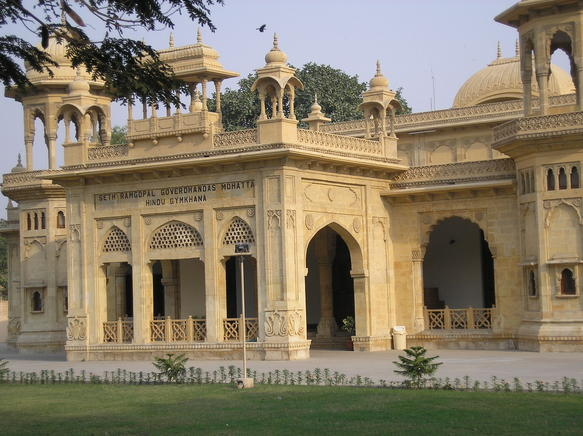
National Academy of Performing Arts, Karachi

A map of literacy rates in Sindh by district as of 2023.

| Year | Literacy rate |
|---|---|
| 1972 | 60.77 |
| 1981 | 37.5% |
| 1998 | 45.29% |
| 2017 | 54.57% |
| 2023 | 57.54% |

=== Universities ===
Major public and private educational institutes in Sindh include:

- Adamjee Government Science College
- Aga Khan University
- APIIT
- Applied Economics Research Centre
- Baqai Medical University
- Chandka Medical College Larkana
- Cadet College Petaro
- College of Digital Sciences
- College of Physicians & Surgeons Pakistan
- D. J. Science College
- Dawood University of Engineering & Technology
- Defence Authority Degree College for Men
- Dow International Medical College
- Dow University of Health Sciences
- Fatima Jinnah Dental College
- Federal Urdu University
- GBELS Dourai Mahar Taluka Daur Distt: Shaheed Benazirabad
- Ghulam Muhammad Mahar Medical College Sukkur
- Government College for Men Nazimabad
- Government College Hyderabad
- Government College of Commerce & Economics
- Government College of Technology, Karachi
- Government Degree College Matiari
- Government High School Ranipur
- Government Islamia Science College Sukkur
- Government Muslim Science College Hyderabad
- Government National College (Karachi)
- Greenwich University (Karachi)
- Hamdard University
- Hussain Ebrahim Jamal Research Institute of Chemistry
- Imperial Science College Nawabshah
- Indus Valley Institute of Art and Architecture
- Institute of Business Administration, Karachi
- Institute of Business Administration, Sukkar
- Institute of Business Management
- Institute of Industrial Electronics Engineering
- Institute of Sindhology
- Iqra University
- Islamia Science College (Karachi)
- Isra University Hyderabad
- Jinnah Medical & Dental College
- Jinnah Polytechnic Institute
- Jinnah Post Graduate Medical Centre
- Jinnah University for Women
- KANUPP Institute of Nuclear Power Engineering
- Karachi Institute of Economics and Technology
- Karachi School of Business and Leadership
- Liaquat University of Medical & Health Sciences
- Mehran University of Engineering and Technology
- Mohammad Ali Jinnah University
- National Academy of Performing Arts
- National University of Computer and Emerging Sciences
- National University of Modern Languages
- National University of Sciences and Technology
- NED University of Engineering and Technology
- Ojha Institute of Chest Diseases
- PAF Institute of Aviation Technology
- TES Public School, Daur
- Pakistan Navy Engineering College
- Pakistan Shipowners' College
- Pakistan Steel Cadet College
- Peoples Medical College for Girls Nawabshah
- PIA Training Centre Karachi
- Provincial Institute of Teachers Education Nawabshah
- Public School Hyderabad
- Quaid-e-Awam University of Engineering, Science and Technology, Nawabshah
- Rana Liaquat Ali Khan Government College of Home Economics
- Saint Patrick's College, Karachi
- Shah Abdul Latif Bhitai University
- Shaheed Benazir Bhutto Medical College
- Shaheed Zulfiqar Ali Bhutto Institute of Science and Technology
- Sindh Agriculture University
- Sindh Medical College
- Superior College of Science Hyderabad
- Sindh Muslim Law College
- Sir Syed Government Girls College
- Sir Syed University of Engineering and Technology
- St. Joseph's College
- Textile Institute of Pakistan
- University of Karachi
- University of Sindh
- Usman Institute of Technology
- Ziauddin Medical University

== Culture ==
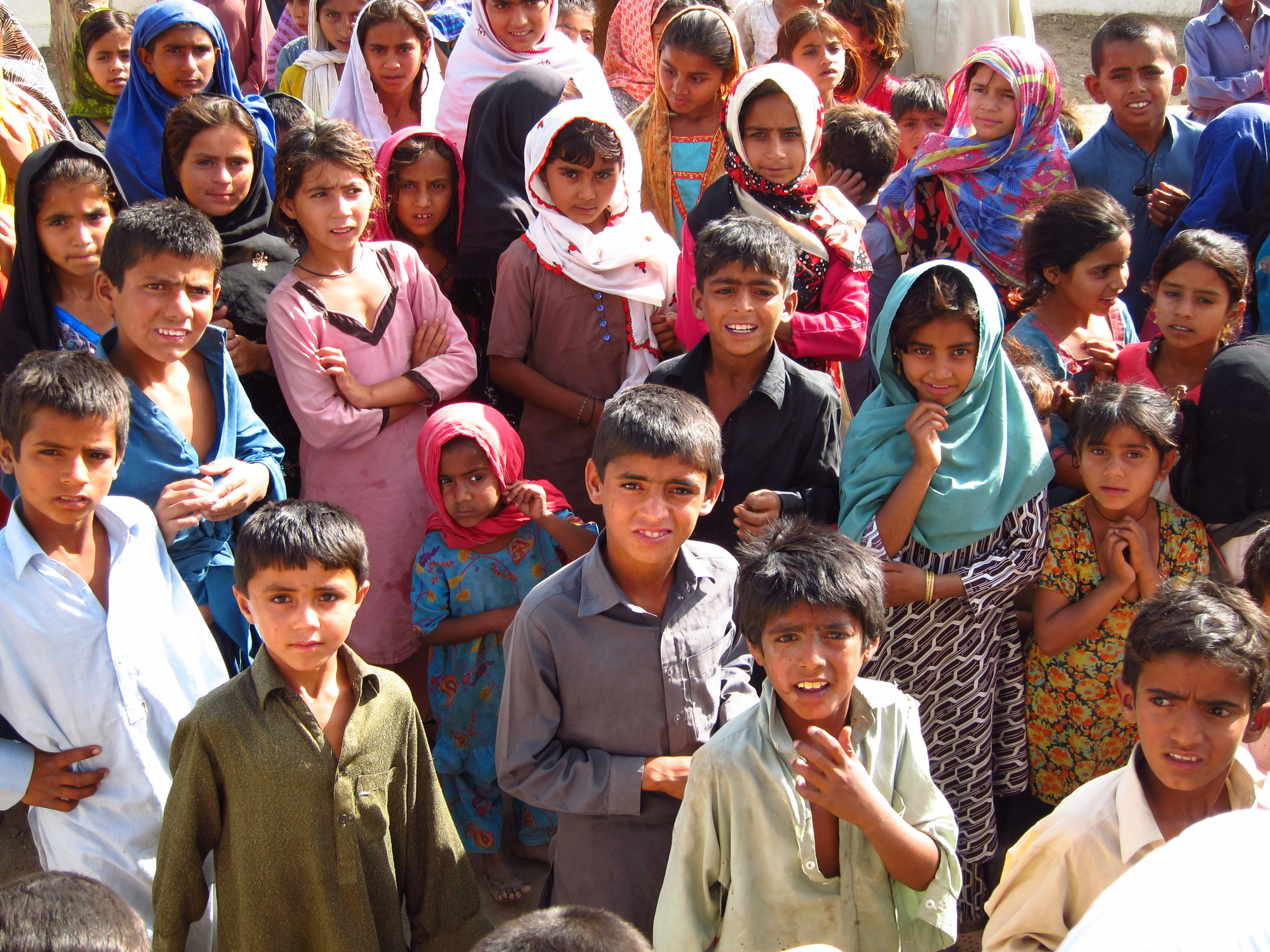
Children in a rural area of Sindh, 2012

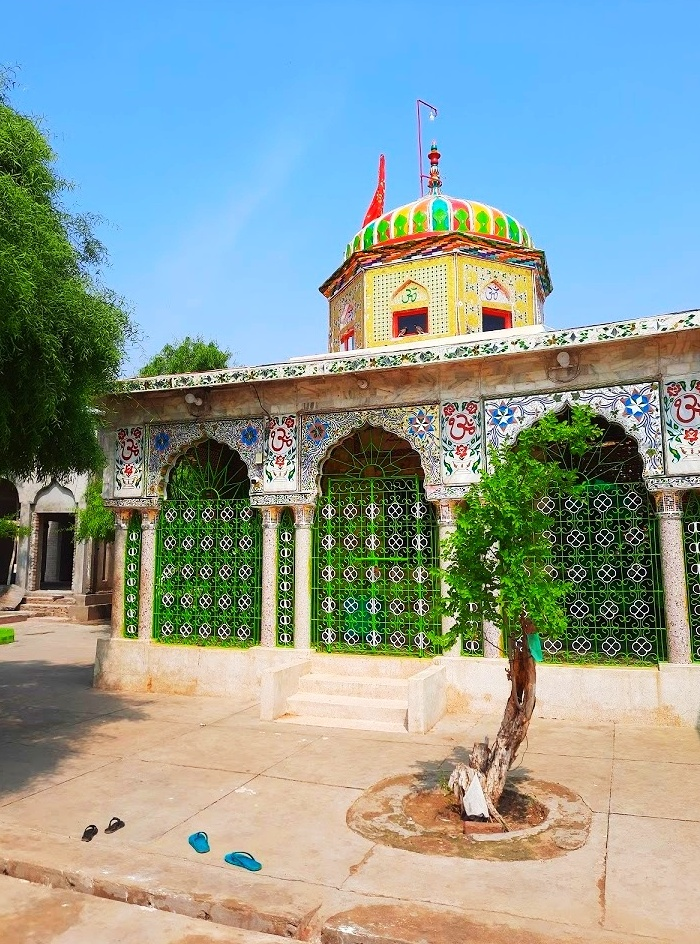
Sant Nenuram Ashram

The rich culture, art and architectural landscape of Sindh have fascinated historians. The culture, folktales, art and music of Sindh form a mosaic of human history.

=== Cultural heritage ===
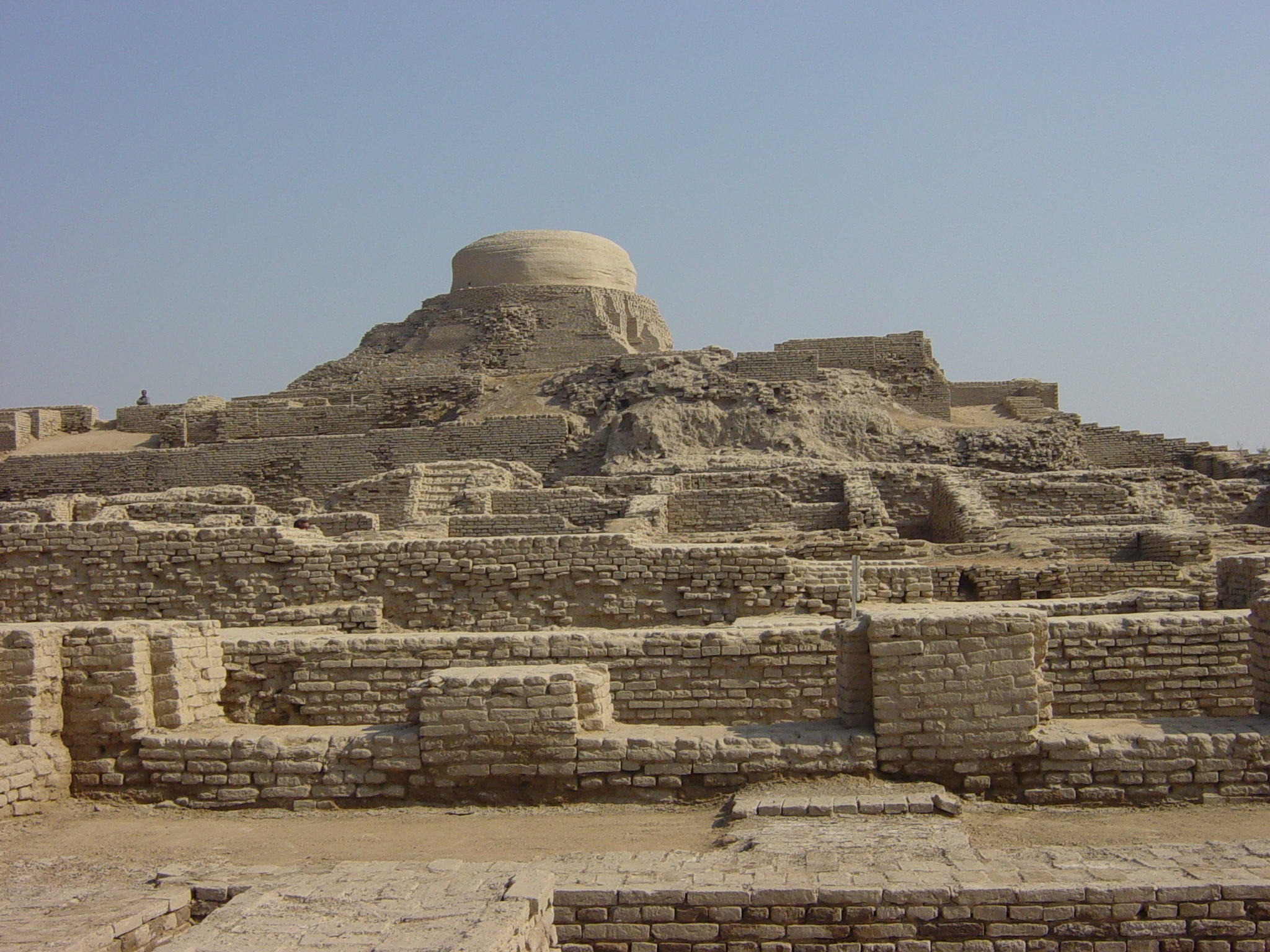
Archaeological ruins at Moenjodaro, Sindh, Pakistan

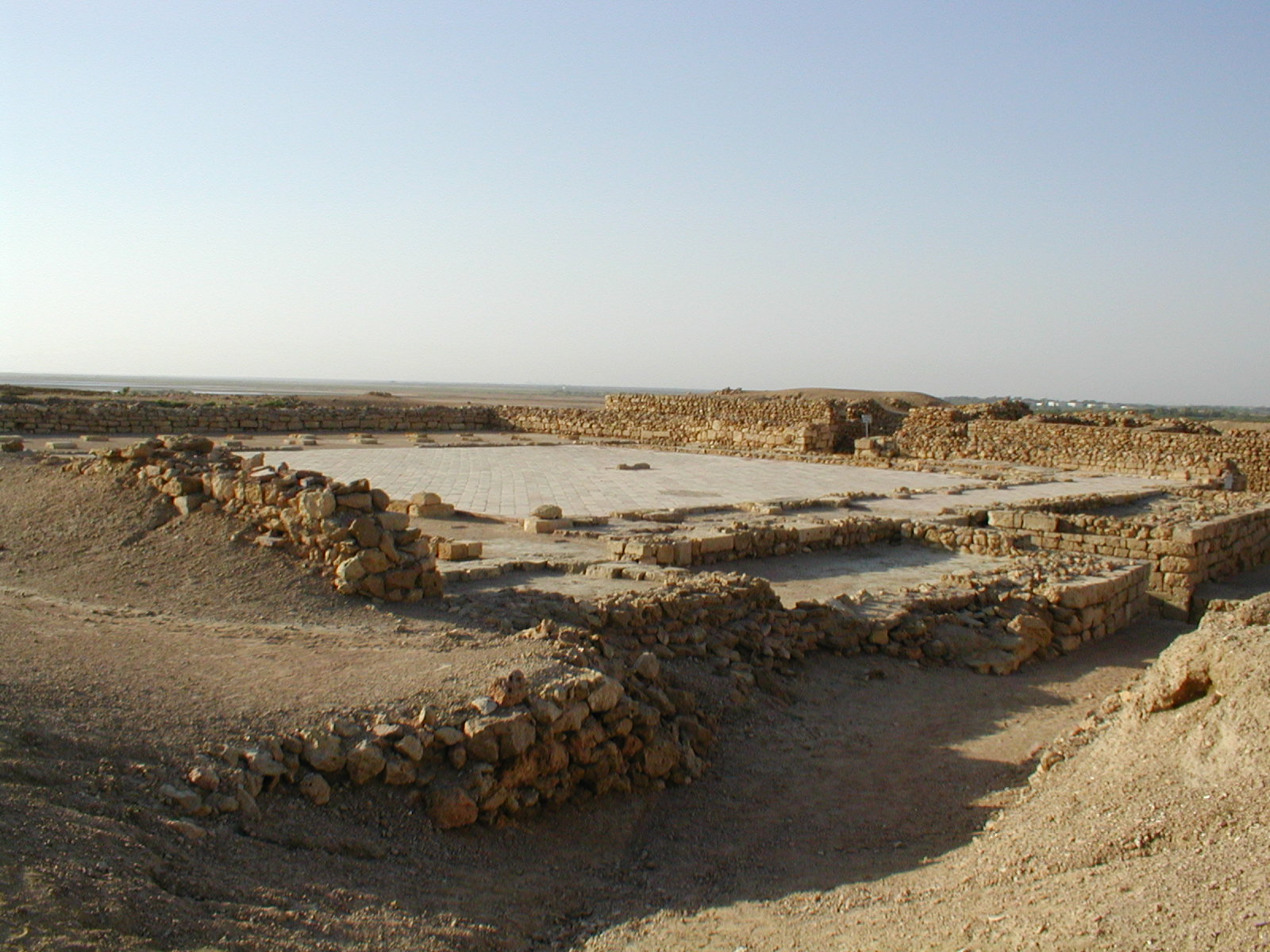
The ruins of an ancient mosque at Bhambore

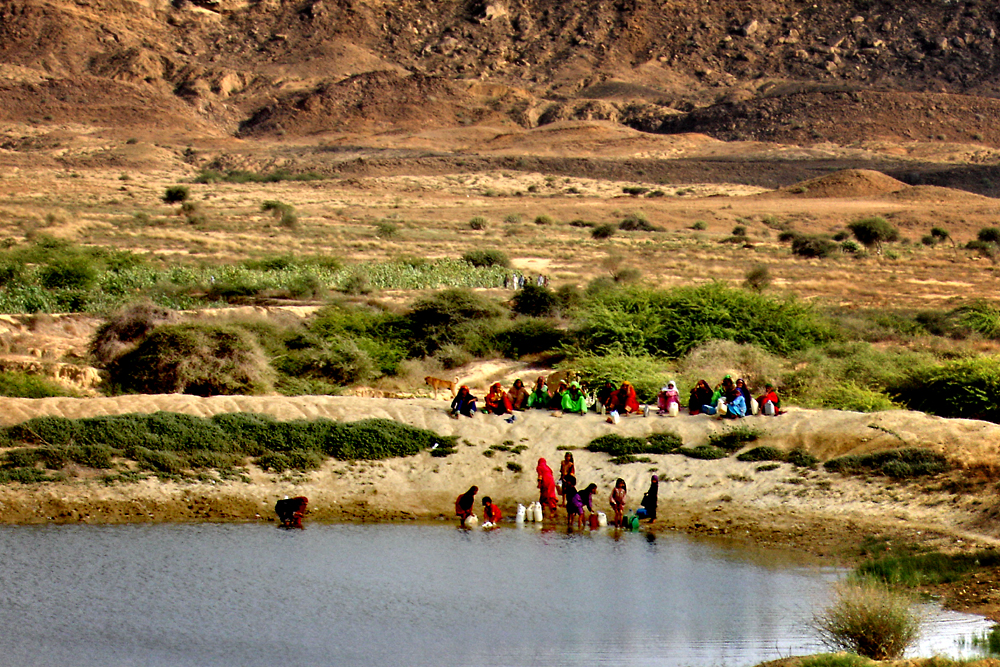
Sindhi women collecting water from a reservoir on the way to Mubarak Village

The work of Sindhi artisans was sold in ancient markets of Damascus, Baghdad, Basra, Istanbul, Cairo and Samarkand. Referring to the lacquer work on wood locally known as Jandi, T. Posten (an English traveller who visited Sindh in the early 19th century) asserted that the articles of Hala could be compared with exquisite specimens of China. Technological improvements such as the spinning wheel (charkha) and treadle (pai-chah) in the weaver's loom were gradually introduced and the processes of designing, dyeing and printing by block were refined. The refined, lightweight, colourful, washable fabrics from Hala became a luxury for people used to the woollens and linens of the age.

Non-governmental organisations (NGOs) such as the World Wildlife Fund, Pakistan, play an important role to promote the culture of Sindh. They provide training to women artisans in Sindh so they get a source of income. They promote their products under the name of "Crafts Forever". Many women in rural Sindh are skilled in the production of caps. Sindhi caps are manufactured commercially on a small scale at New Saeedabad and Hala New. Sindhi people began celebrating Sindhi Topi Day on 6 December 2009, to preserve the historical culture of Sindh by wearing Ajrak and Sindhi topi.

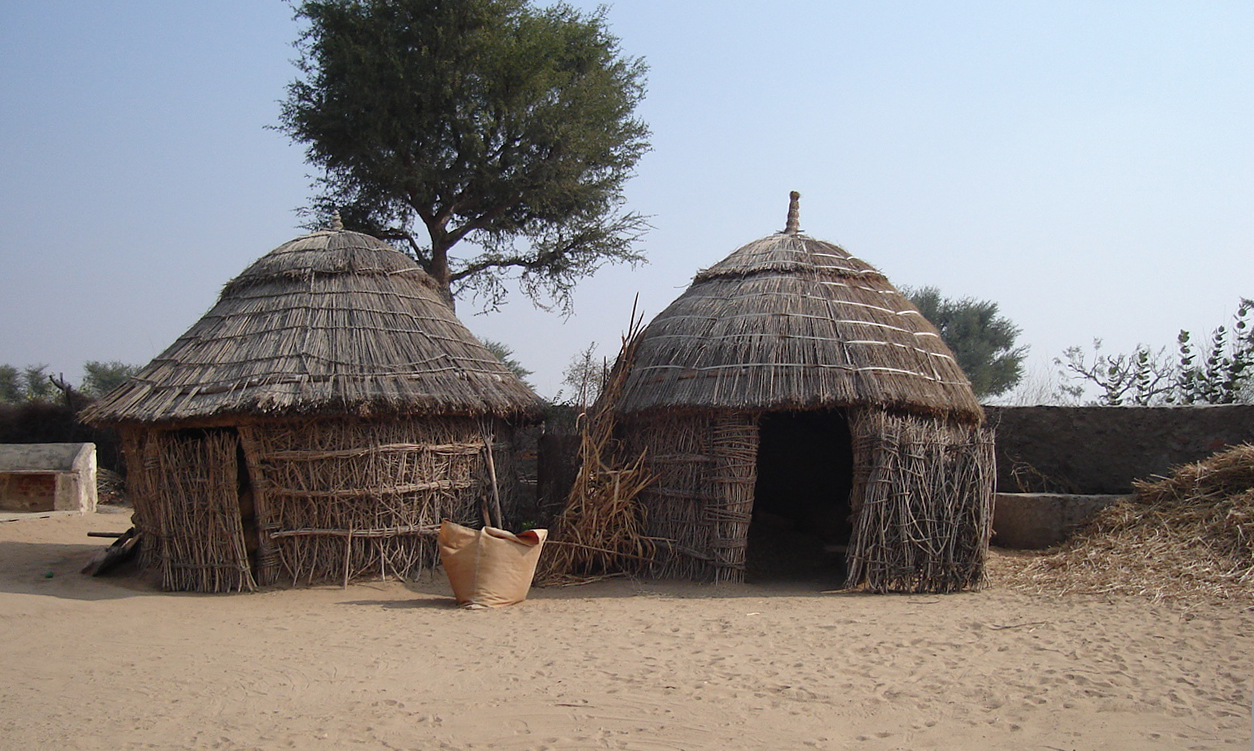
Huts in the Thar desert

== Tourism ==
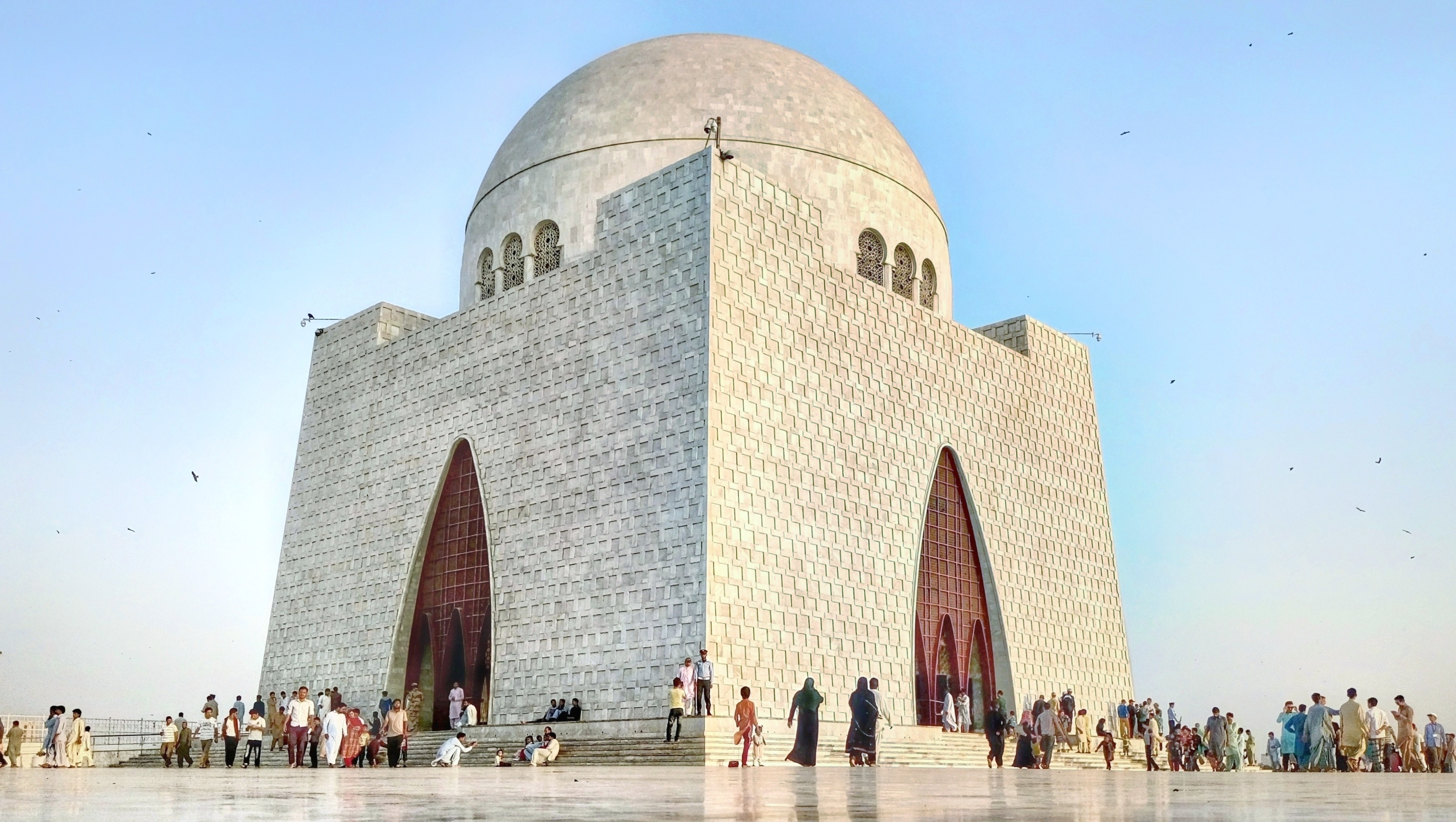
Mazar-e-Quaid in Karachi

Sindh is a province in Pakistan.

The province includes a number of important historical sites. The Indus Valley civilization (IVC) was a Bronze Age civilization (mature period 2600–1900 BC) which was centred mostly in the Sindh. Sindh has numerous tourist sites with the most prominent being the ruins of Mohenjo-daro near the city of Larkana. Islamic architecture is quite prominent as well as colonial and post-partition sites. Natural sites, like Manchar Lake have increasingly been a source of sustainable tourism in the province.

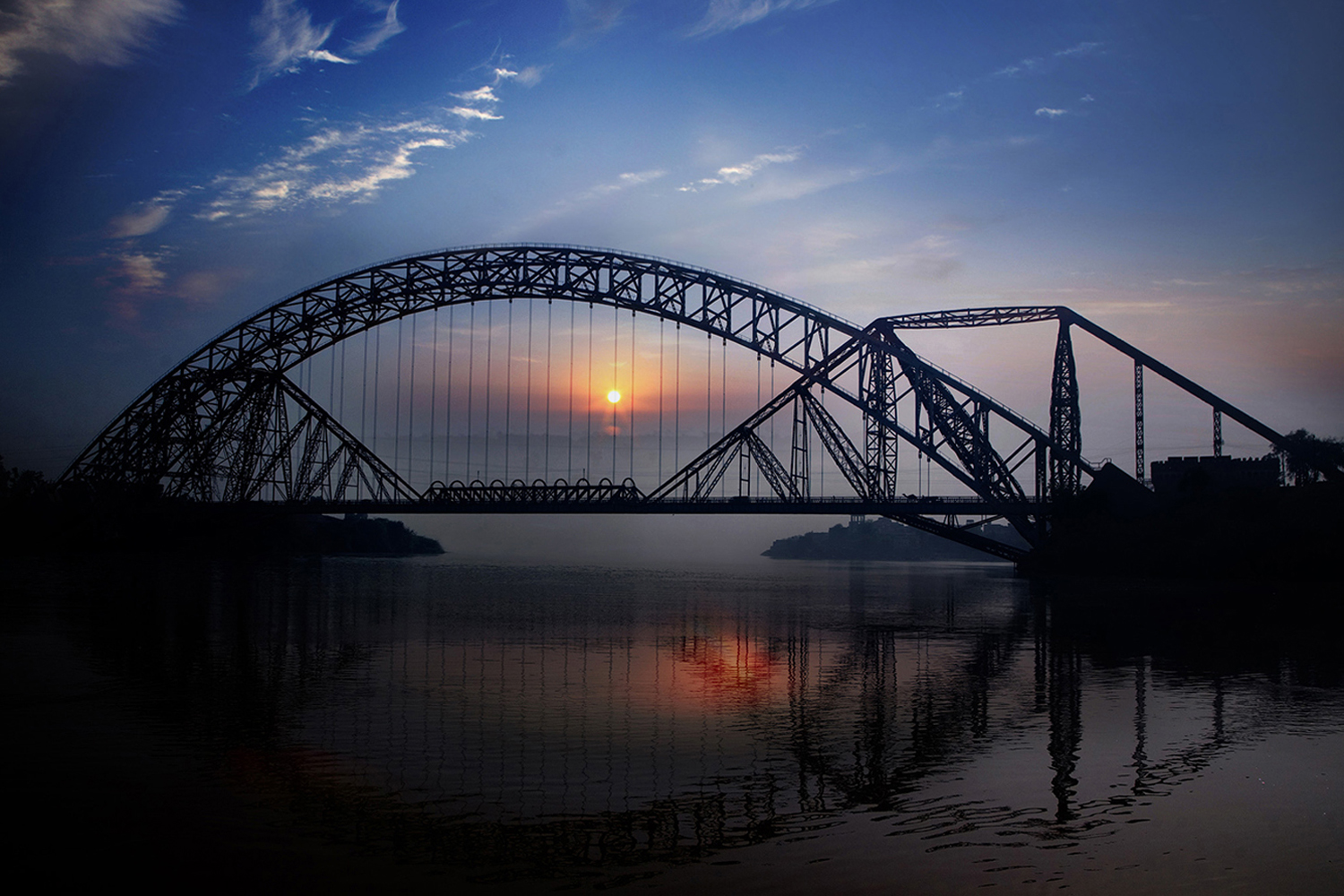
Sukkur Bridge

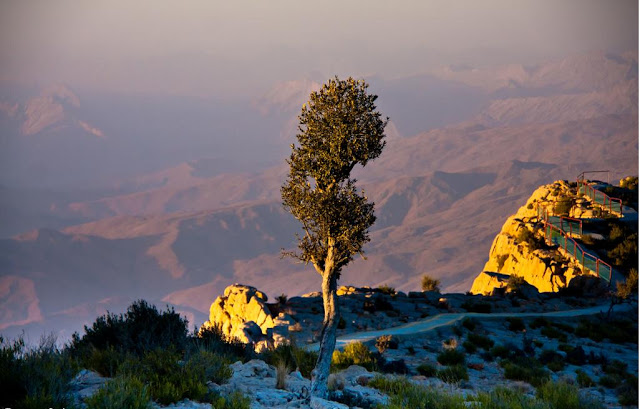
Gorakh Hill Station, Dadu

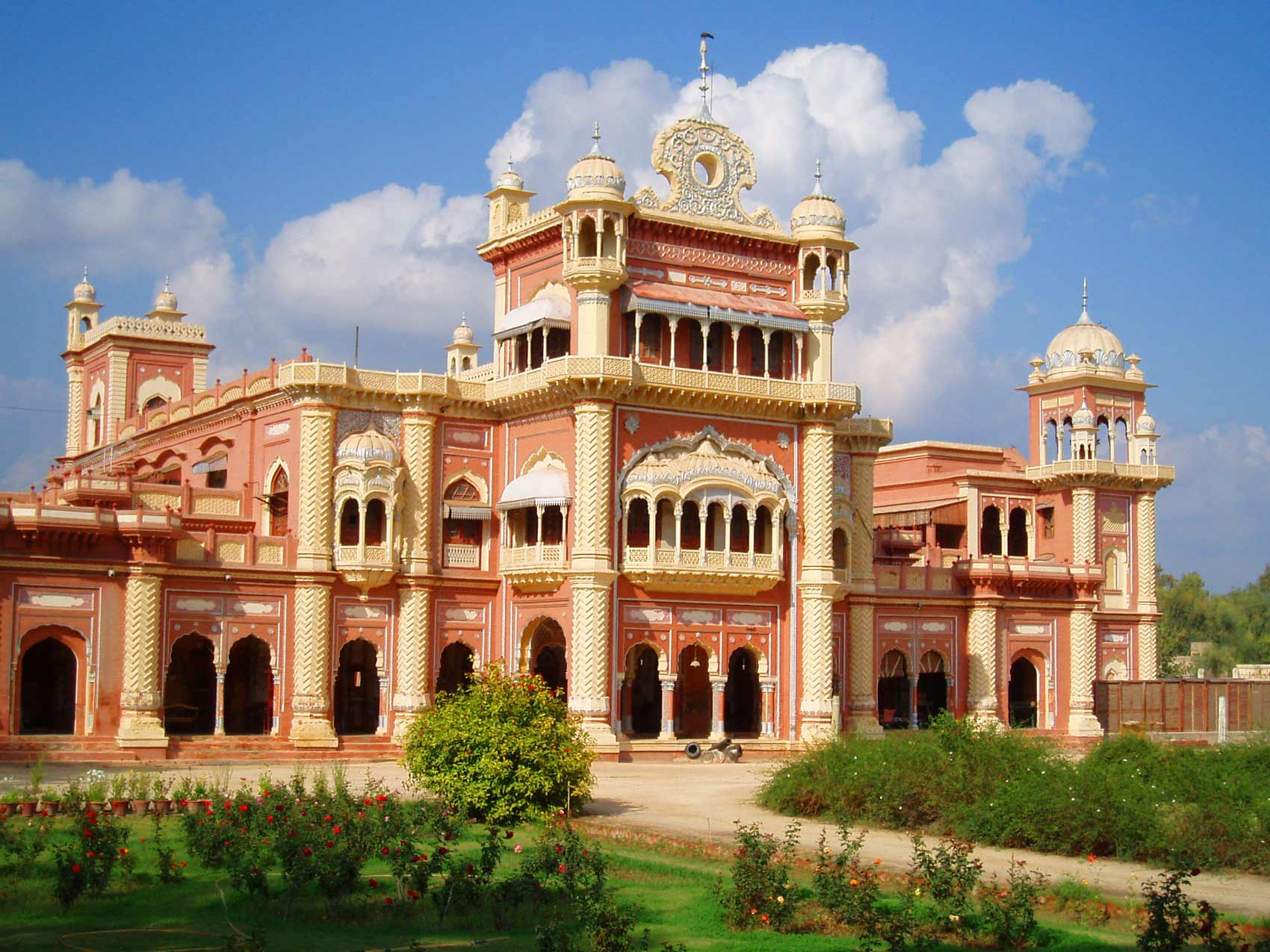
Faiz Mahal, Khairpur

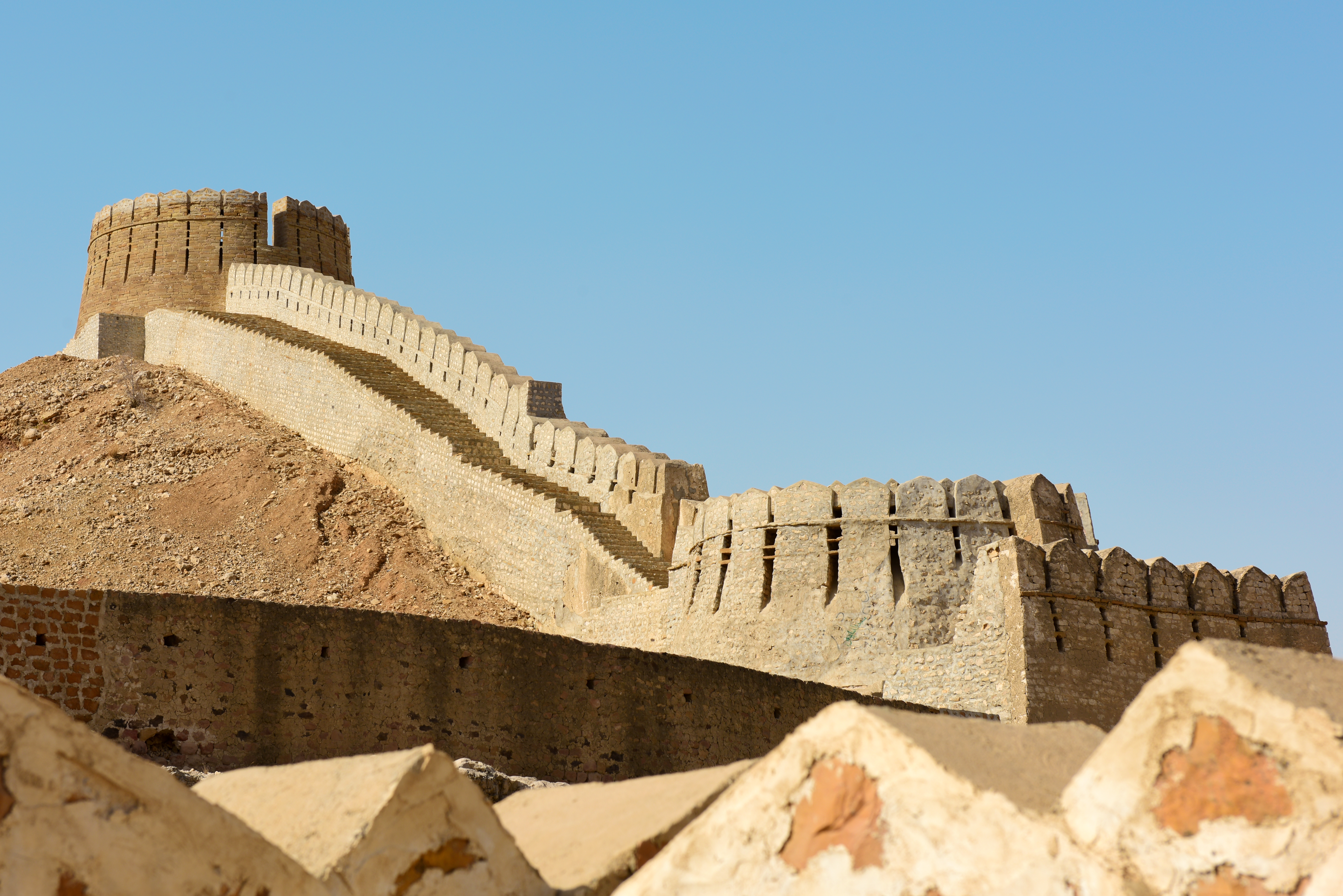
Ranikot Fort, one of the largest forts in the world Thana Bula Khan, Jamshoro

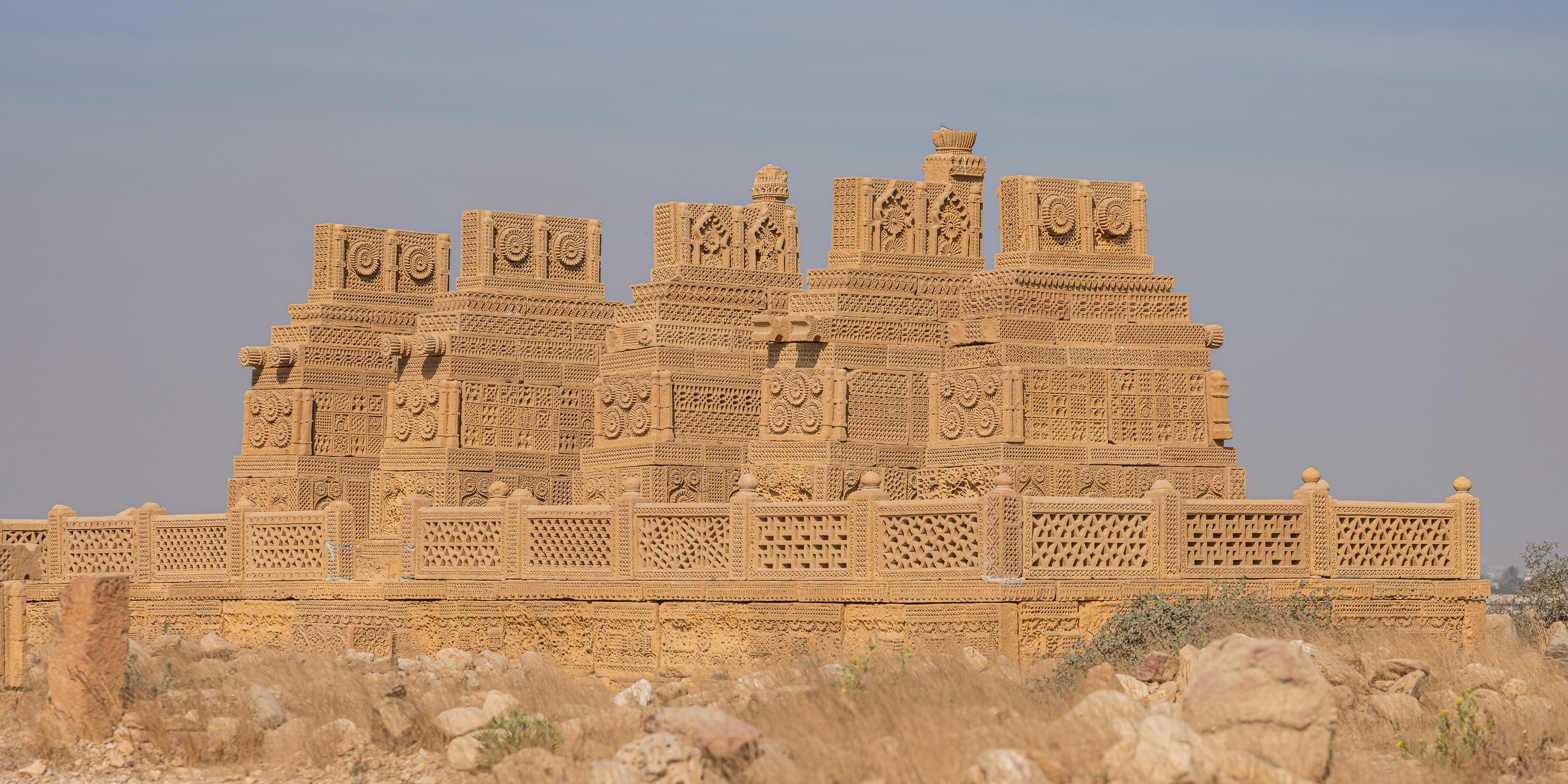
Chaukhandi tombs, Karachi

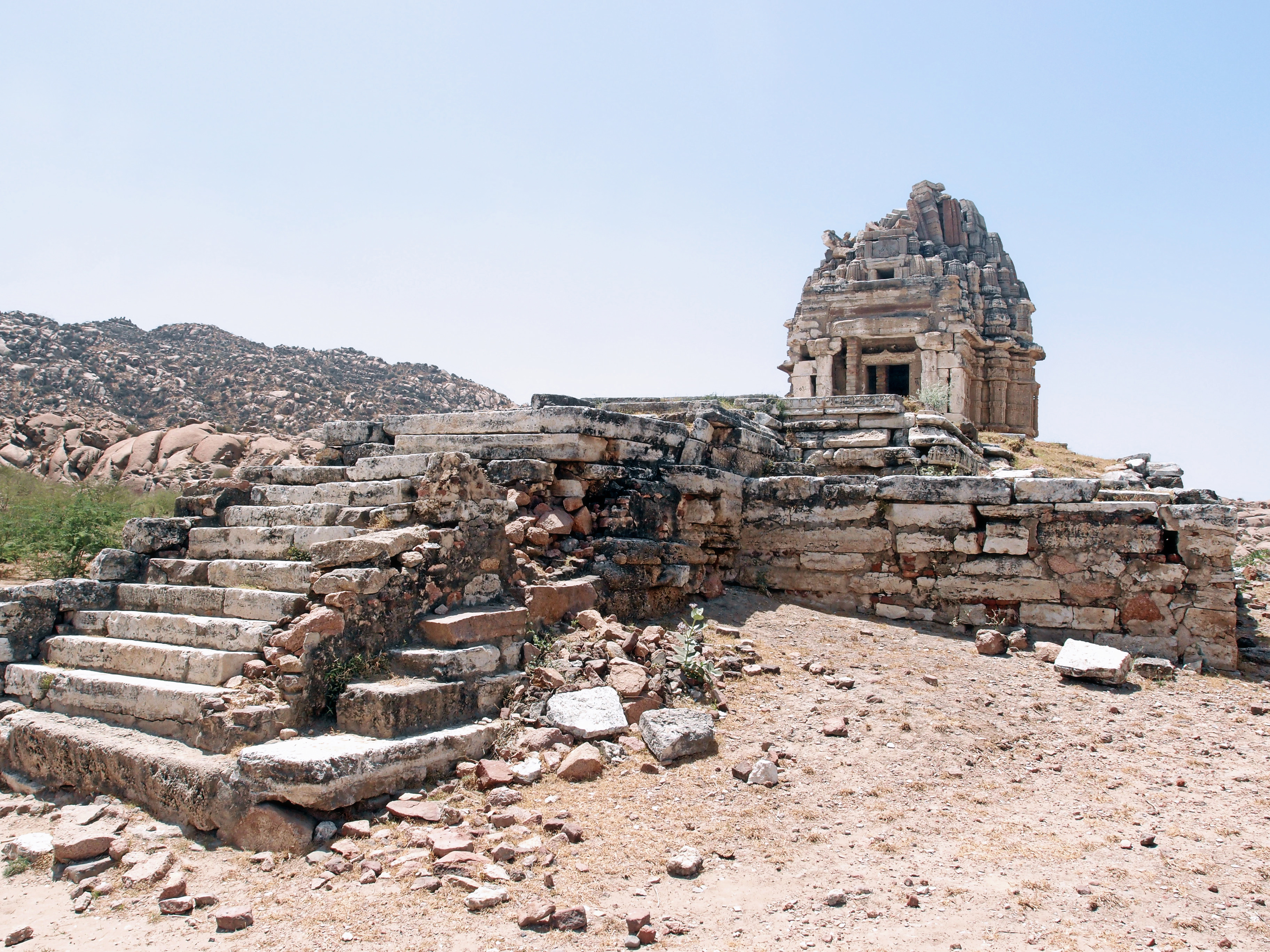
Remains of 9th century Jain temple in Bhodesar, near Nagarparkar

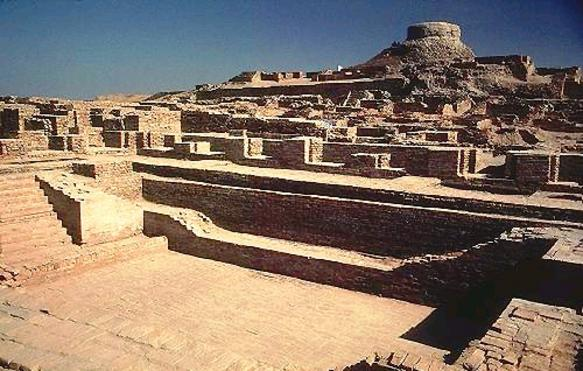
Excavated ruins of Mohenjo-daro

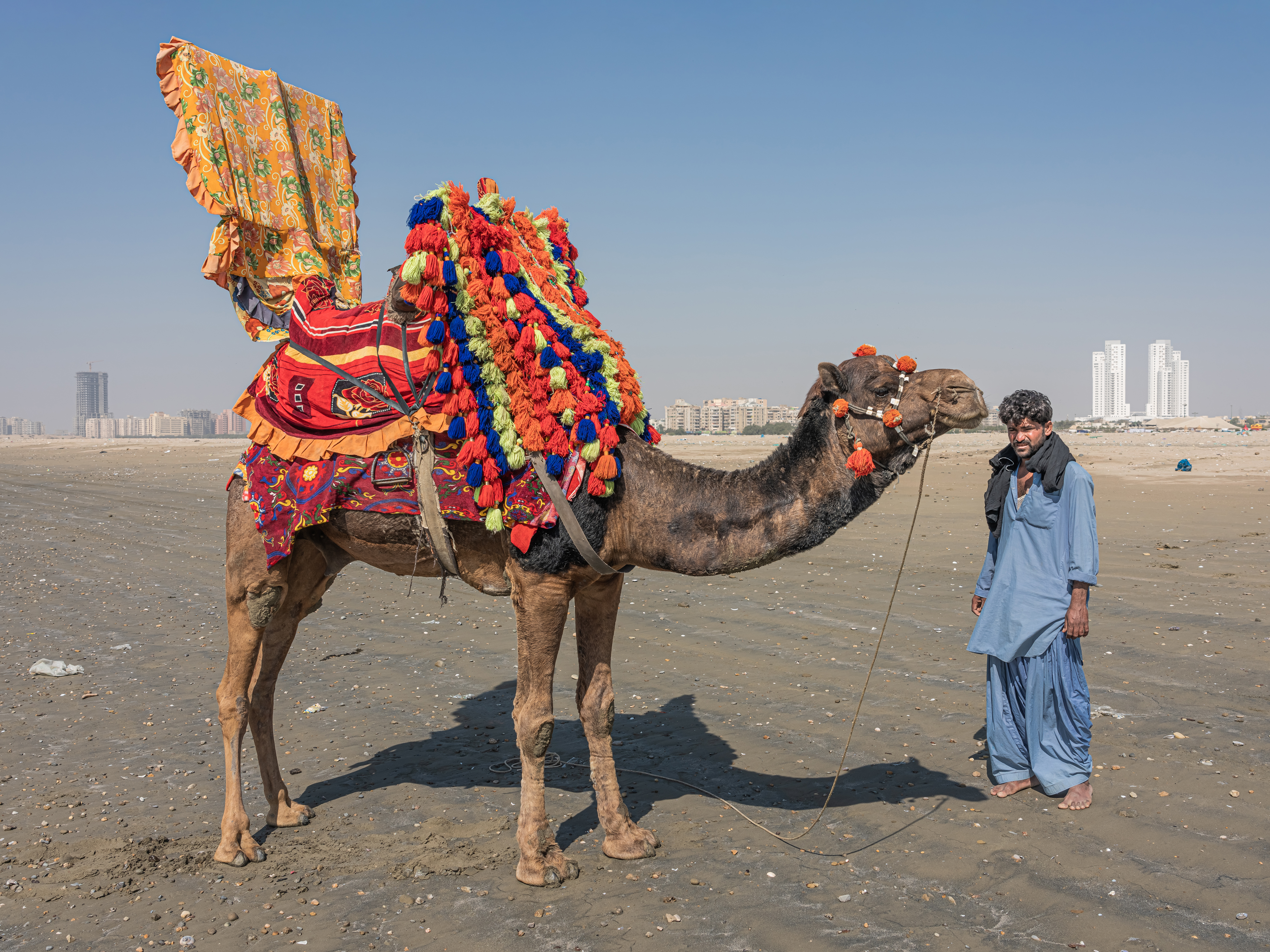
Karachi Beach

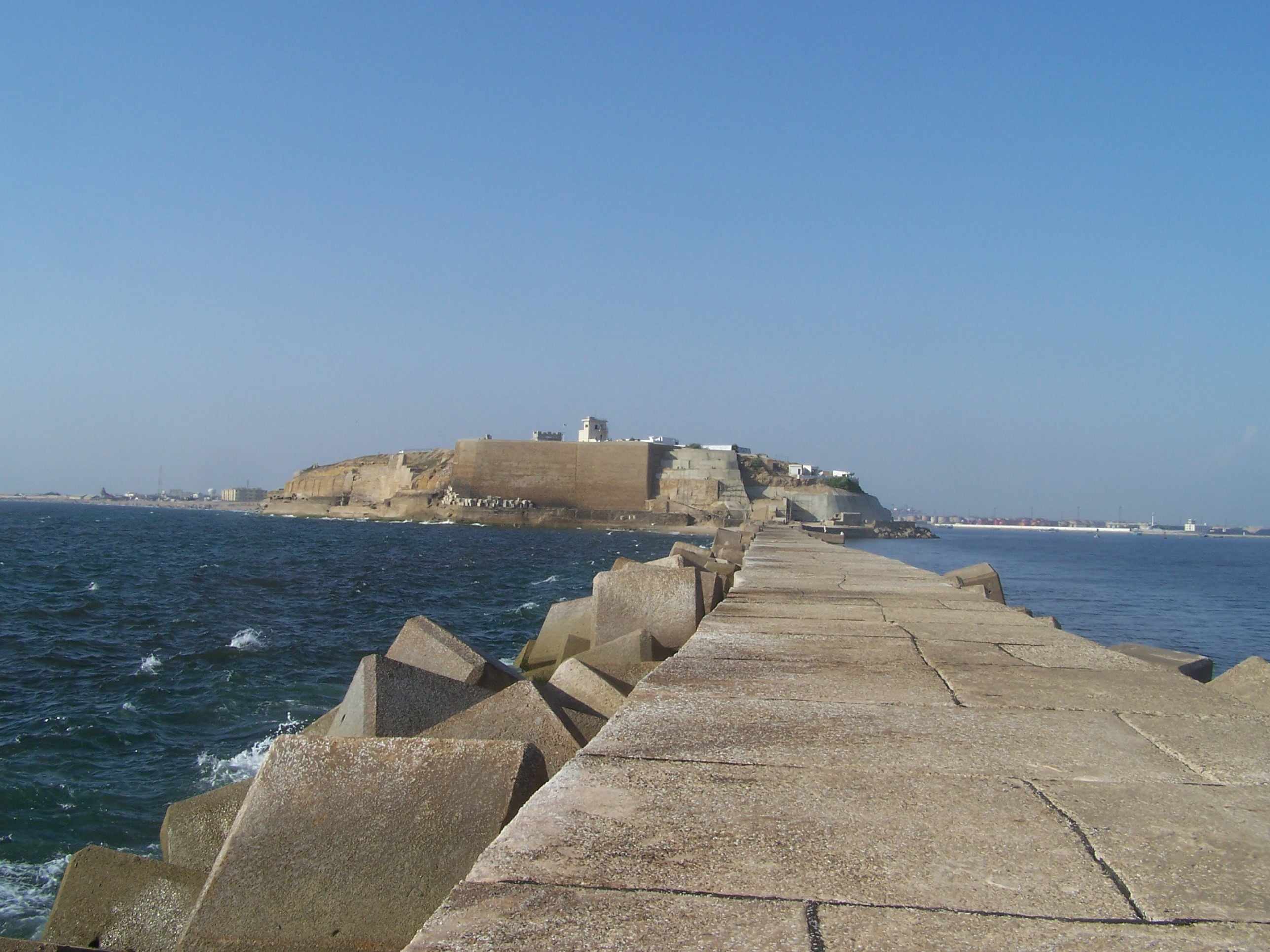
Qasim fort, Manora Island Karachi

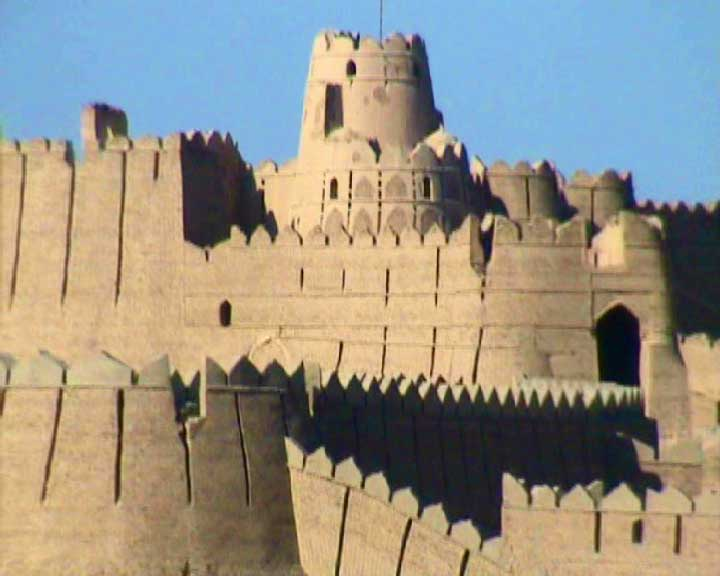
Kot Diji, Khairpur

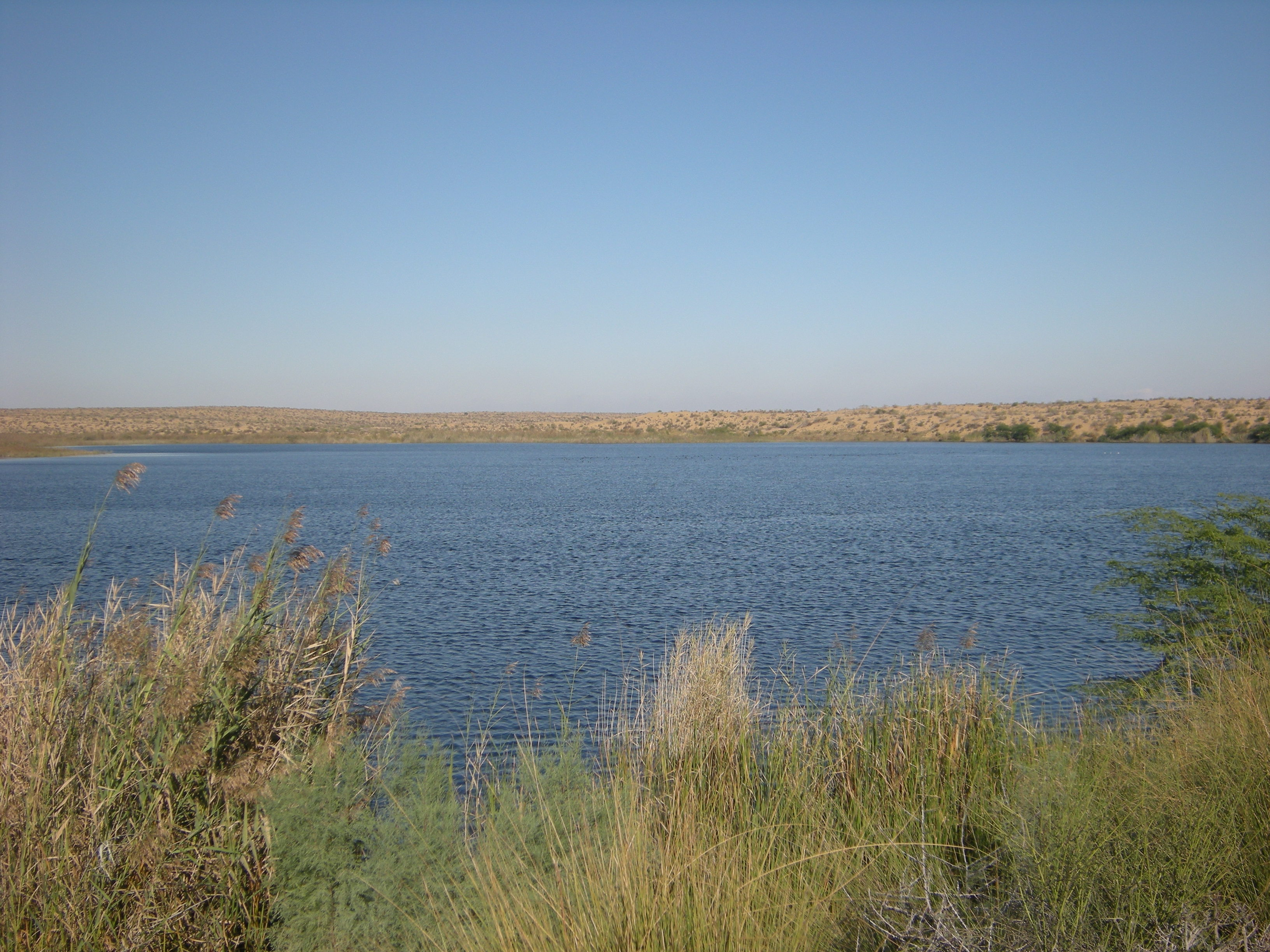
Bakri Waro Lake, Khairpur

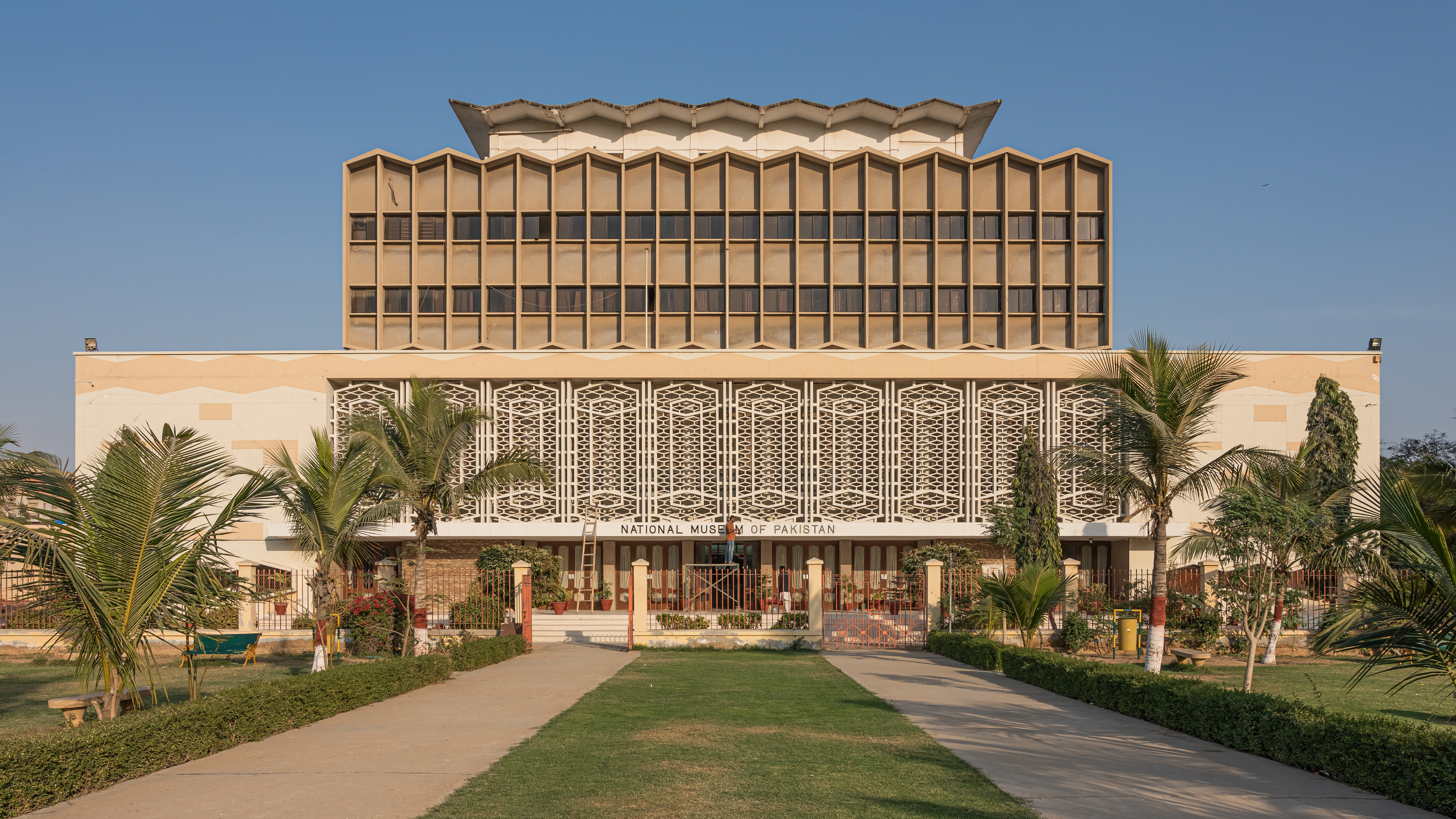
National Museum of Pakistan, Karachi

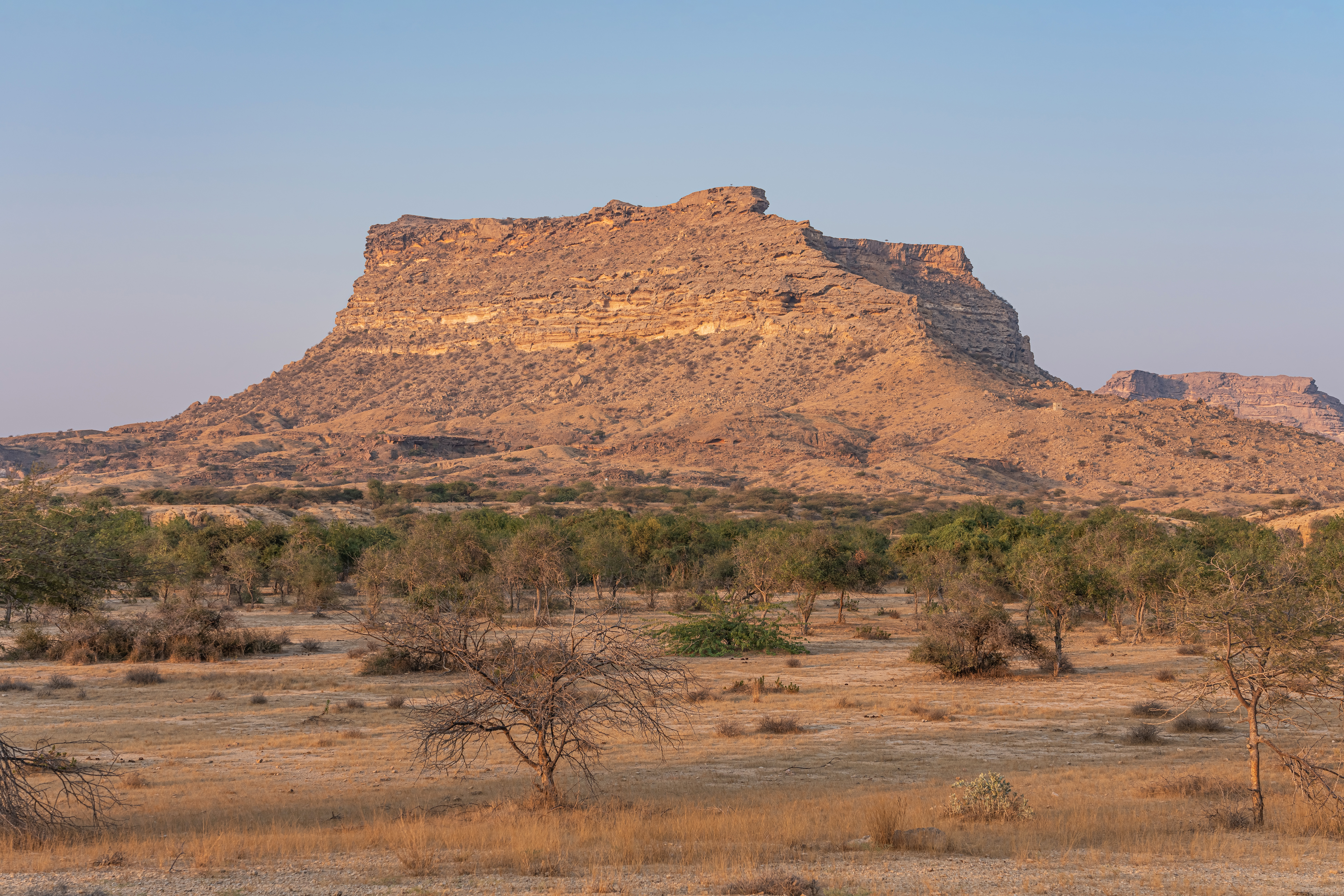
Kirthar National Park, Thano Bula Khan, Jamshoro

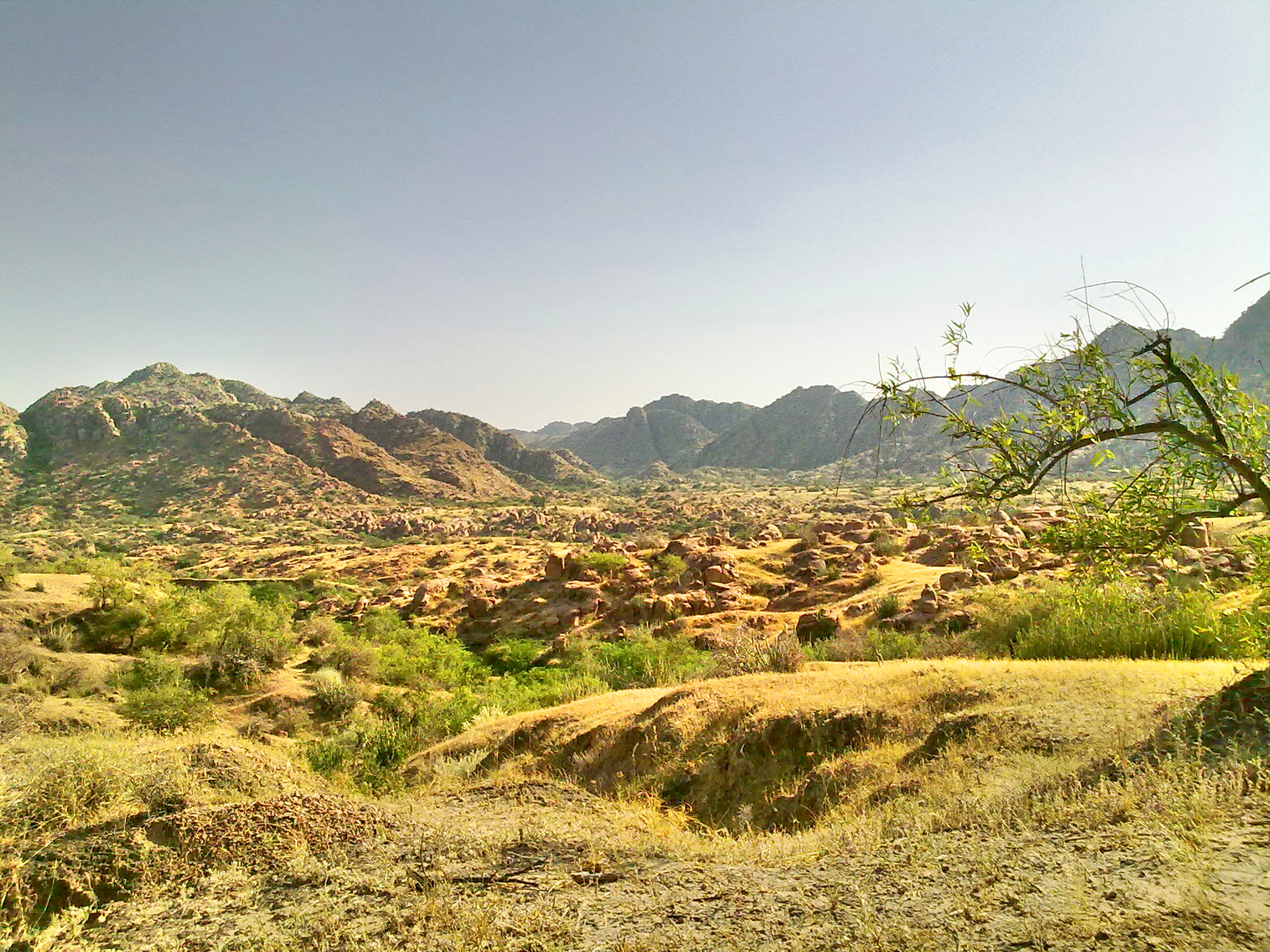
Karoonjhar Mountains, Tharparkar

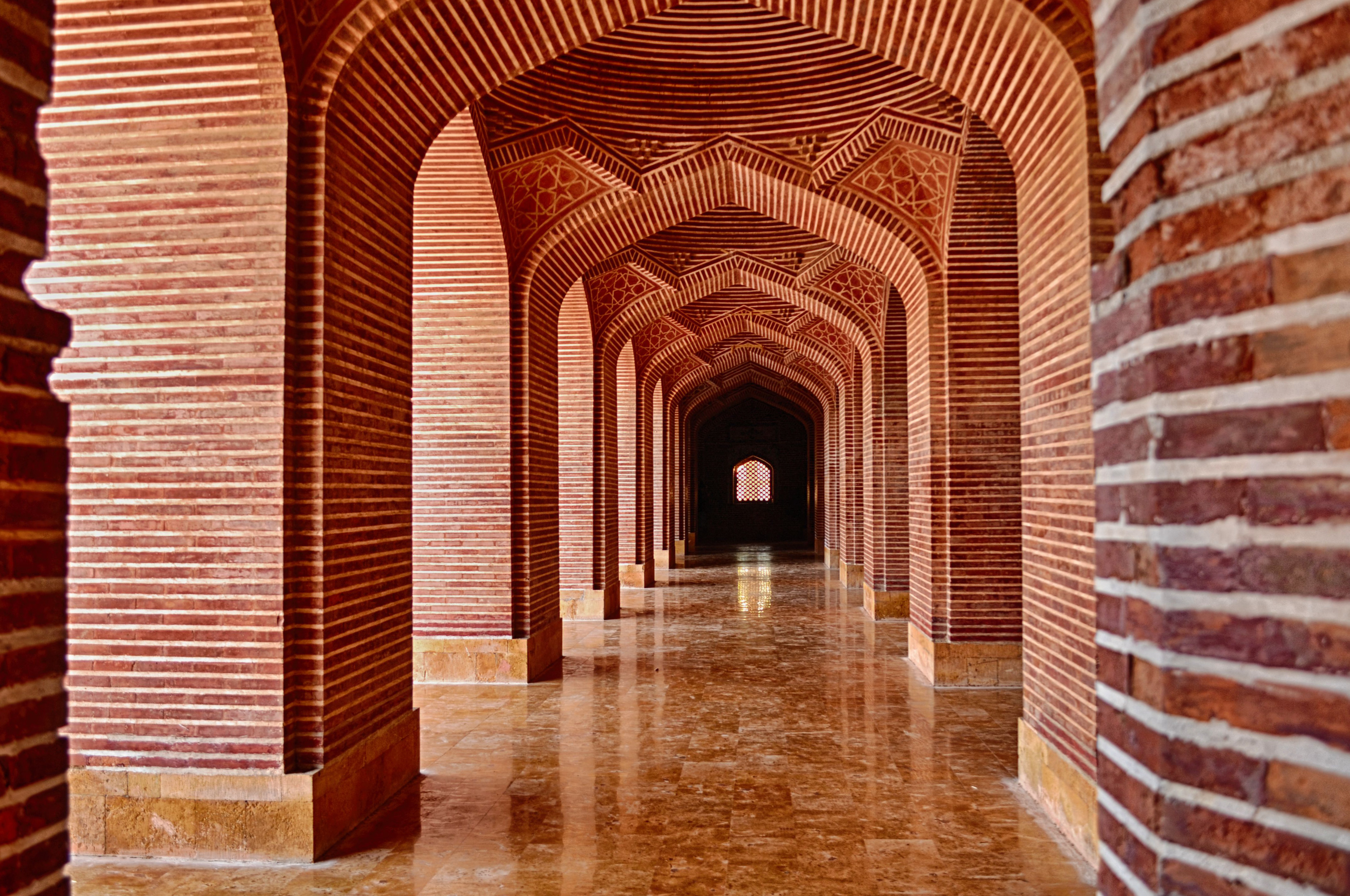
Shah Jahan Mosque, Thatta

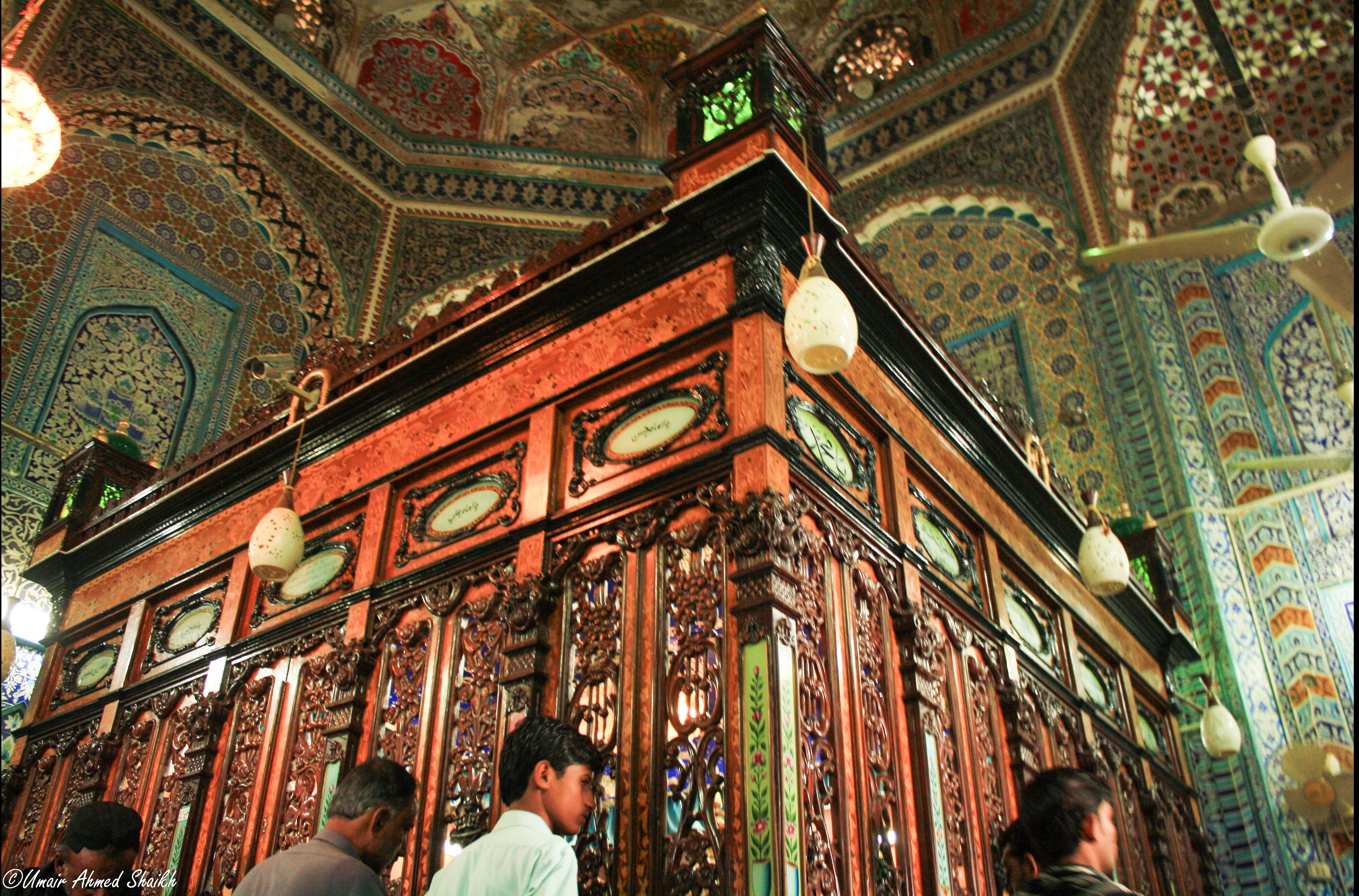
Tomb of Shah Abdul Latif Bhittai, Matiari

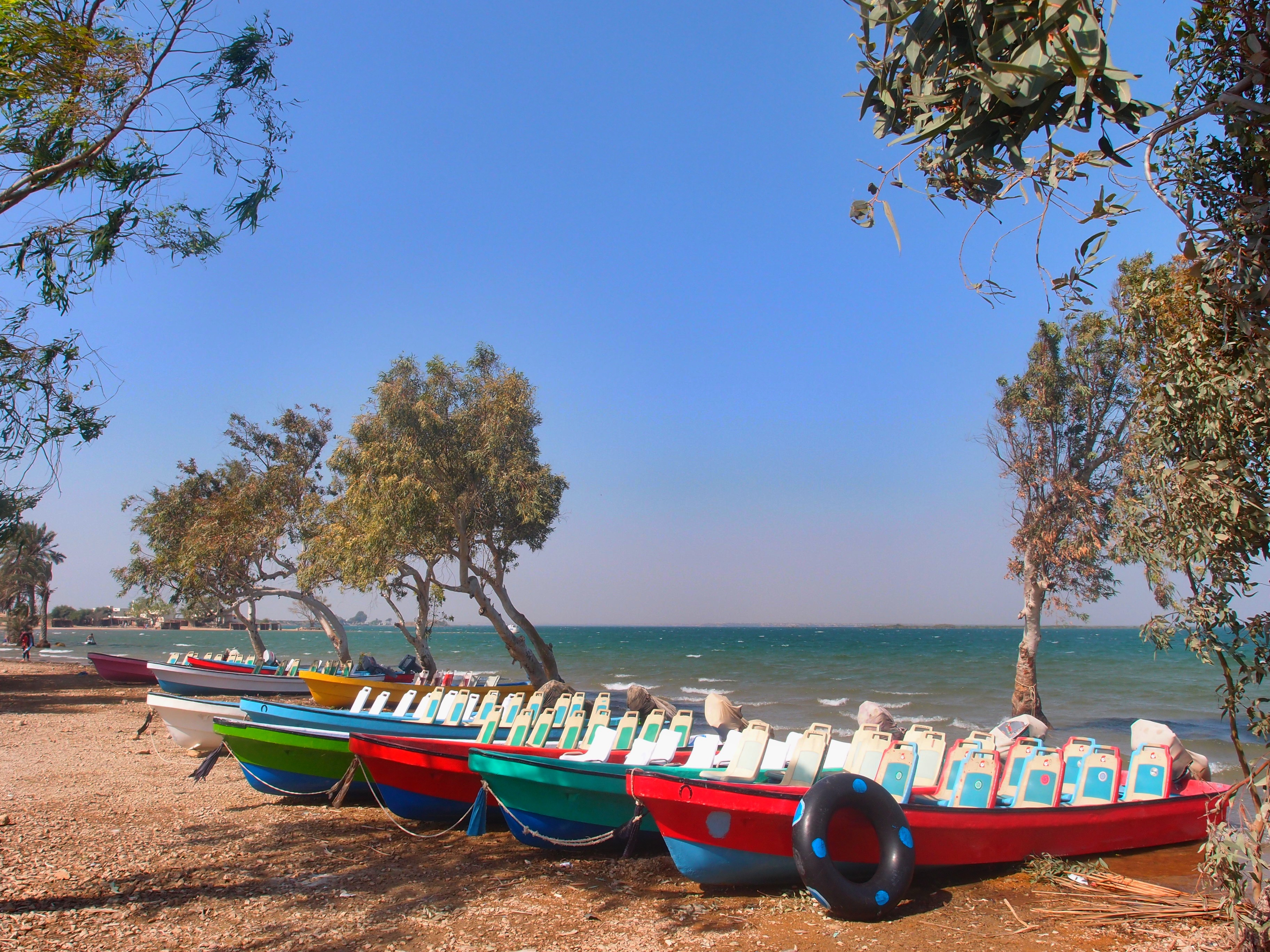
Keenjhar Lake

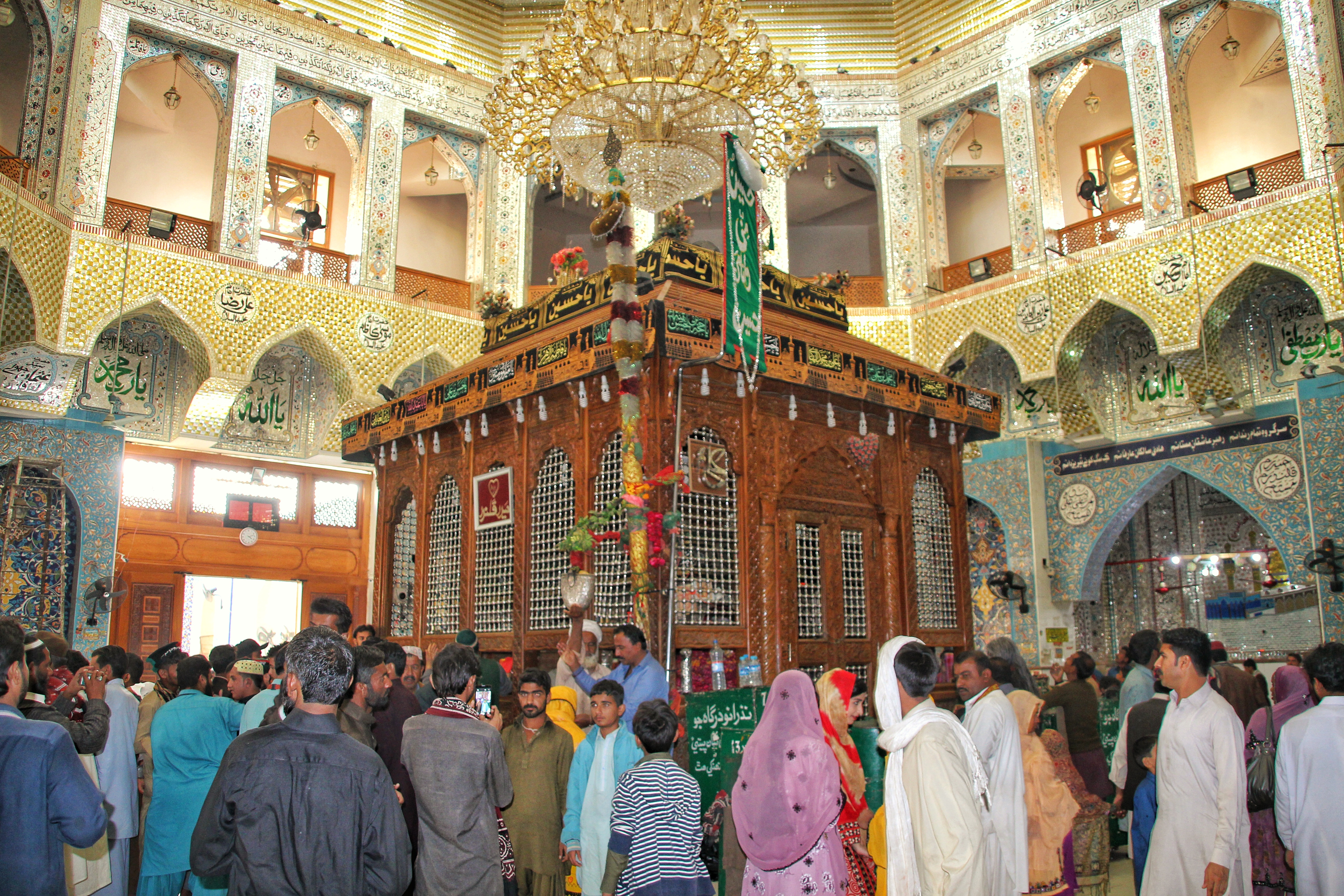
Lal Shahbaz Qalandar, Sehwan Sharif, Jamshoro

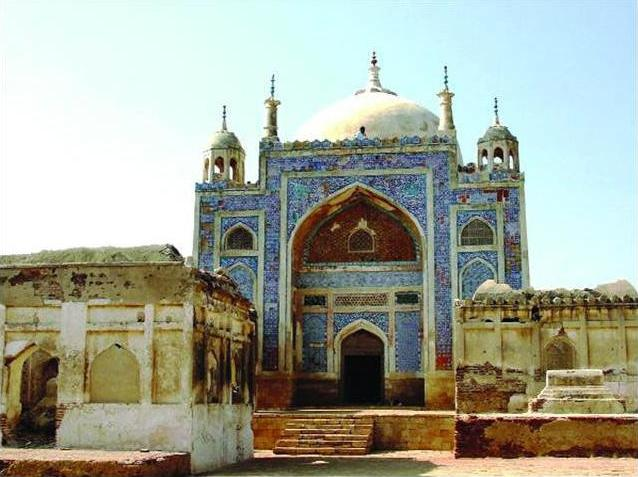
Tomb of Mian Noor Muhammad, Benazirabad

== CNIC Codes ==
- Hyderabad Division (41XXX)
- Karachi Division (42000-42501)
- Larkana Division (43XXX)
- Mirpur Khas Division (44XXX)
- Sukkur Division + Shaheed Benazirabad Division (45XXX)

== See also ==
- Arab Sind
- Bagh Prints
- Brahma from Mirpur-Khas
- Debal
- Institute of Sindhology
- List of cities in Sindh by population
- List of cultural heritage sites in Sindh
- List of medical schools in Sindh
- List of districts of Pakistan
- List of Sindhi people
- List of Sindhi tribes
- Mansura, Sindh
- Mohenjo-daro
- Provincial Highways of Sindh
- Sind Division
- Sindh cricket team
- Sindhi clothing
- Sindhu Kingdom
- Sufism in Sindh
- Tomb paintings of Sindh

== Bibliography ==
- Ansari, Sarah F.D. (1992). Sufi saints and state power: the pirs of Sind, 1843–1947. Vol. 50. Cambridge: Cambridge University Press. ISBN 9780511563201.
- Asif, Manan Ahmed (2016), A Book of Conquest, Harvard University Press, ISBN 978-0-674-66011-3
- Brooke, John L. (2014). Climate Change and the Course of Global History: A Rough Journey. Cambridge University Press. ISBN 978-0-521-87164-8.
- Dani, A.H. (1981). "Sindhu – Sauvira : A glimpse into the early history of Sind". In Khuhro, Hamida (ed.). Sind through the centuries : proceedings of an international seminar held in Karachi in Spring 1975. Karachi: Oxford University Press. pp. 35–42. ISBN 978-0-19-577250-0.
- Eggermont, Pierre Herman Leonard (1975). Alexander's Campaigns in Sind and Baluchistan and the Siege of the Brahmin Town of Harmatelia. Peeters Publishers. ISBN 978-90-6186-037-2. Archived from the original on 22 September 2024.
- Giosan L, Clift PD, Macklin MG, Fuller DQ, et al. (2012). "Fluvial landscapes of the Harappan civilization". Proceedings of the National Academy of Sciences. 109 (26): E1688–E1694. Bibcode:2012PNAS..109E1688G. doi:10.1073/pnas.1112743109. ISSN 0027-8424. PMC 3387054. PMID 22645375.
- Jain, Kailash Chand (1974). Lord Mahāvīra and His Times. Motilal Banarsidass. ISBN 978-0-8426-0738-4.
- Jalal, Ayesha (4 January 2002), Self and Sovereignty: Individual and Community in South Asian Islam Since 1850, Routledge, ISBN 978-1-134-59937-0, archived from the original on 4 April 2023
- Madella, Marco; Fuller, Dorian Q. (2006). "Palaeoecology and the Harappan Civilisation of South Asia: a reconsideration". Quaternary Science Reviews. 25 (11–12): 1283–1301. Bibcode:2006QSRv...25.1283M. doi:10.1016/j.quascirev.2005.10.012. ISSN 0277-3791.
- Malkani, Kewal Ram (1984). The Sindh Story. Allied Publishers.
- Phiroze Vasunia (16 May 2013). The Classics and Colonial India. Oxford University Press. ISBN 978-01-9920-323-9.
- Ponton, Camilo; Giosan, Liviu; Eglinton, Tim I.; Fuller, Dorian Q.; et al. (2012). "Holocene aridification of India" (PDF). Geophysical Research Letters. 39 (3). L03704. Bibcode:2012GeoRL..39.3704P. doi:10.1029/2011GL050722. hdl:1912/5100. ISSN 0094-8276. Archived (PDF) from the original on 12 March 2020.
- Possehl, Gregory L. (2002). The Indus Civilization: A Contemporary Perspective. Rowman Altamira. ISBN 978-0-7591-1642-9.
- Rashid, Harunur; England, Emily; Thompson, Lonnie; Polyak, Leonid (2011). "Late Glacial to Holocene Indian Summer Monsoon Variability Based upon Sediment Records Taken from the Bay of Bengal" (PDF). Terrestrial, Atmospheric and Oceanic Sciences. 22 (2): 215–228. Bibcode:2011TAOS...22..215R. doi:10.3319/TAO.2010.09.17.02(TibXS). ISSN 1017-0839. Archived (PDF) from the original on 10 March 2016.
- Sikdar, Jogendra Chandra (1964). Studies in the Bhagawatīsūtra. Muzaffarpur, Bihar, India: Research Institute of Prakrit, Jainology & Ahimsa. pp. 388–464.
- Staubwasser, M.; Sirocko, F.; Grootes, P. M.; Segl, M. (2003). "Climate change at the 4.2 ka BP termination of the Indus valley civilization and Holocene south Asian monsoon variability". Geophysical Research Letters. 30 (8): 1425. Bibcode:2003GeoRL..30.1425S. doi:10.1029/2002GL016822. ISSN 0094-8276. S2CID 129178112.
- Thorpe, Showick Thorpe Edgar (2009), The Pearson General Studies Manual 2009, 1/e, Pearson Education India, ISBN 978-81-317-2133-9
- Tripathi, Rama Shankar (1967), History of Ancient India, Motilal Banarsidass, ISBN 978-81-208-0018-2
- Wink, André (1991). Al- Hind: The slave kings and the Islamic conquest. 2. BRILL. ISBN 9004095098. Archived from the original on 3 March 2025.
- Wink, Andre (1996). Al Hind: The Making of the Indo-Islamic World. BRILL. ISBN 90-04-09249-8.
