= NA-201 Sukkur-II =

Constituency of the National Assembly of Pakistan

- Constituency for the National Assembly of Pakistan
- Region: Salehpat Tehsil, Rohri Tehsil (partly) excluding Rohri city and Pano Akil Tehsil (partly) of Sukkur District
- Electorate: 376,504

Current constituency
- Party: Pakistan People's Party
- Member: Syed Khurshid Ahmed Shah
- Created from: NA-199 Sukkur-II

NA-201 Sukkur-II (این اے-201، سكهّر-2) is a constituency for the National Assembly of Pakistan.

== Assembly Segments ==
Constituency number	Constituency	District	Current MPA	Party
22	PS-22 Sukkur-I	Sukkur District	Ikramullah Khan Dharejo	PPP
23	PS-23 Sukkur-II	Sukkur District	Awais Qadir Shah	PPP

== Election 2002 ==
General elections were held on 10 October 2002. Abdul Mujeeb Pirzada of PPP won by 51,694 votes.

General election 2002: NA-199 Sukkur-II
Party	Candidate	Votes	%	±%
PPP	Abdul Mujeeb Pirzada	51,694	47.82	
NA	Taj Mohammad Shaikh	46,282	42.81	
MQM	Begum Zahida Abbasi	3,403	3.15	
MMA	Mohammad Ramzan Bhutto	2,694	2.49	
Others	Others (eleven candidates)	4,040	3.73	
Turnout		111,121	38.84	
Total valid votes		108,113	97.29	
Rejected ballots		3,008	2.71	
Majority		5,412	5.01	
Registered electors		286,117		

== Election 2008 ==
General elections were held on 18 February 2008. Syed Khursheed Ahmed Shah of PPP won by 93,394 votes.

General election 2008: NA-199 Sukkur-II
Party	Candidate	Votes	%	±%
PPP	Syed Khursheed Ahmed Shah	93,394	72.71	
PML(Q)	Taj Mohammad Shaikh	34,204	26.63	
Others	Others (eleven candidates)	856	0.65	
Turnout		130,999	48.67	
Total valid votes		128,454	98.06	
Rejected ballots		2,545	1.94	
Majority		59,190	46.08	
Registered electors		269,183		
PPP hold				

== Election 2013 ==
General elections were held on 11 May 2013. Syed Khursheed Ahmed Shah of PPP won by 85,120 votes and became the member of National Assembly.

General election 2013: NA-199 Sukkur-II
Party	Candidate	Votes	%	±%
PPP	Syed Khursheed Ahmed Shah	85,120	56.10	
PML(F)	Inayatullah	52,118	34.35	
Others	Others (eighteen candidates)	14,503	9.55	
Turnout		156,865	57.36	
Total valid votes		151,741	96.73	
Rejected ballots		5,124	3.27	
Majority		33,002	21.75	
Registered electors		273,483		
PPP hold				

== Election 2018 ==
General elections were held on 25 July 2018.

General election 2018: NA-206 Sukkur-I
Party	Candidate	Votes	%	±%
PPP	Syed Khurshid Ahmed Shah	84,708	52.02	
PTI	Syed Tahir Hussain Shah	58,767	36.09	
MMA	Muhammad Saleh Indhar	14,438	8.87	
Pakistan Rah-e-Haq Party	Abdul Jabbar	2,394	1.47	
Independent	Nek Muhammad	1,118	0.69	
Independent	Syed Farukh Ahmed Shah	224	0.14	
APML	Gulham Mujtaba	204	0.13	
Independent	Ali Gohar Khan Indhar	195	0.12	
Independent	Habibullah Siddique	151	0.09	
Independent	Amanullah	102	0.06	
Independent	Muhammad Hayat	97	0.06	
Independent	Syed Kumail Hyder Shah	82	0.05	
PSP	Naheed Begum	79	0.05	
Independent	Nusrat Bano	70	0.04	
Independent	Manzoor Hussain Shar	47	0.03	
Independent	Aftab Hussain Soomro	25	0.02	
Turnout		172,394	58.21	
Total valid votes		162,843	94.46	
Rejected ballots		9,551	5.54	
Majority		25,941	15.93	
Registered electors		296,145		
PPP hold				

== Election 2024 ==
Elections were held on 8 February 2024. Syed Khurshid Ahmed Shah won the election with 121,556 votes.

General election 2024: NA-201 Sukkur-II
Party	Candidate	Votes	%	±%
PPP	Khurshid Shah	121,556	66.83	▲14.81
JUI (F)	Muhammad Saleh Indhar	53,625	29.48	
Others	Others (ten candidates)	6,714	3.69	
Turnout		189,830	50.42	▼7.79
Total valid votes		181,895	95.82	
Rejected ballots		7,935	4.18	
Majority		67,931	37.35	▲21.42
Registered electors		376,504		
PPP hold				

== See also ==
- NA-200 Sukkur-I
- NA-202 Khairpur-I
