= NA-200 Sukkur-I =

Constituency of the National Assembly of Pakistan

- Constituency for the National Assembly of Pakistan
- Region: Sukkur Tehsil, Rohri Tehsil (partly) including Rohri city and Pano Akil Tehsil (partly) of Sukkur District
- Electorate: 457,057

Current constituency
- Party: Pakistan People's Party
- Member: Nauman Islam Shaikh
- Created from: NA-198 Sukkur-I

NA-200 Sukkur-I (این اے-200، سكهّر-1) is a constituency for the National Assembly of Pakistan.

== Assembly Segments ==
| Constituency number | Constituency | District | Current MPA | Party |
|---|---|---|---|---|
| 24 | PS-24 Sukkur-III | Sukkur District | Syed Farukh Ahmed Shah | PPP |
| 25 | PS-25 Sukkur-IV | Sukkur District | Nasir Hussain Shah | PPP |

== Election 2002 ==
General elections were held on 10 October 2002. Syed Khurshid Ahmed Shah of PPP won by 35291 votes.

General election 2002: NA-198 Sukkur-I
| Party | Candidate | Votes | % | ±% |
|---|---|---|---|---|
| PPP | Syed Khursheed Ahmed Shah | 35,291 | 42.91 | |
| MMA | Muhammad Asad Thanvi | 17,230 | 20.95 | |
| MQM | Sakhi Abdul Razak Khoso | 14,945 | 18.17 | |
| PML(F) | Abdul Qadir Ghumro | 11,043 | 13.43 | |
| Others | Others (twelve candidates) | 3,736 | 4.54 | |
| Turnout | | 83,910 | 35.14 | |
| Total valid votes | | 82,245 | 98.02 | |
| Rejected ballots | | 1,665 | 1.98 | |
| Majority | | 18,061 | 21.96 | |
| Registered electors | | 238,761 | | |

== Election 2008 ==
General elections were held on 18 February 2008. Nauman Islam Shaikh of PPP won by 74,086 votes.

General election 2008: NA-198 Sukkur-I
| Party | Candidate | Votes | % | ±% |
|---|---|---|---|---|
| PPP | Nauman Islam Shaikh | 74,086 | 68.86 | |
| PML(Q) | Tahir Hussain Shah | 22,854 | 21.24 | |
| Others | Others (fourteen candidates) | 10,655 | 9.90 | |
| Turnout | | 110,060 | 41.63 | |
| Total valid votes | | 107,595 | 97.76 | |
| Rejected ballots | | 2,465 | 2.24 | |
| Majority | | 51,232 | 47.62 | |
| Registered electors | | 264,407 | | |
| PPP hold | | | | |

== Election 2013 ==
General elections were held on 11 May 2013. Nauman Islam Shaikh of PPP won by 52,684 votes and became the member of National Assembly.

General election 2013: NA-198 Sukkur-I
| Party | Candidate | Votes | % | ±% |
|---|---|---|---|---|
| PPP | Nauman Islam Shaikh | 52,684 | 41.59 | |
| MQM | Munawar Ali Choohan | 28,569 | 22.55 | |
| JUI (F) | Agha Syed Muhammad Ayoob | 16,712 | 13.19 | |
| PTI | Dawa Khan | 8,584 | 6.78 | |
| Independent | Mubeen Ahmed | 5,407 | 4.27 | |
| Others | Others (thirty six candidates) | 14,722 | 11.62 | |
| Turnout | | 131,174 | 51.63 | |
| Total valid votes | | 126,678 | 96.57 | |
| Rejected ballots | | 4,496 | 3.43 | |
| Majority | | 24,115 | 19.04 | |
| Registered electors | | 254,082 | | |
| PPP hold | | | | |

== Election 2018 ==
General elections are scheduled to be held on 25 July 2018.

General election 2018: NA-207 Sukkur-II
| Party | Candidate | Votes | % | ±% |
|---|---|---|---|---|
| PPP | Nauman Islam Shaikh | 70,870 | 42.43 | |
| PTI | Mobeen Ahmad | 60,531 | 36.24 | |
| MMA | Syed Muhammad Ayoub | 20,878 | 12.50 | |
| PML(N) | Muhammad Tahir Sheikh | 2,511 | 1.50 | |
| Independent | Didar Ali | 2,434 | 1.46 | |
| Tabdeeli Pasand Party Pakistan | Wazir Ali | 2,333 | 1.40 | |
| MQM-P | Ghulam Murtaza | 1,624 | 0.97 | |
| Independent | Hazoor Bux | 1,498 | 0.90 | |
| Independent | Amanullah Khoso | 1,291 | 0.77 | |
| Independent | Muhammad Murad | 895 | 0.54 | |
| Independent | Gohar Ali Khosa | 684 | 0.41 | |
| Independent | Syed Ali Raza Shah | 179 | 0.11 | |
| Independent | Shaista | 176 | 0.11 | |
| AWP | Ziauddin Butt | 157 | 0.09 | |
| Independent | Muhammad Amir Shaikh | 132 | 0.79 | |
| PRHP | Rasheed Ahmed Shah | 116 | 0.07 | |
| Independent | Ameer Bux Alias Meer | 115 | 0.07 | |
| PSP | Sohail Niaz Khosa | 111 | 0.07 | |
| Independent | Khurshid Afghan | 81 | 0.05 | |
| Independent | Wazir Ali Jatoi | 79 | 0.05 | |
| Independent | Saood Afzal | 78 | 0.05 | |
| Independent | Naveed Ali | 76 | 0.05 | |
| Independent | Akbar Ali | 60 | 0.04 | |
| Independent | Khudo Dino Shagi | 52 | 0.03 | |
| Independent | Hafiz Muhammad Zamman | 49 | 0.03 | |
| Turnout | | 174,147 | 42.40 | |
| Total valid votes | | 167,010 | 95.90 | |
| Rejected ballots | | 7,137 | 4.10 | |
| Majority | | 10,339 | 6.19 | |
| Registered electors | | 410,722 | | |
| PPP hold | | | | |

== Election 2024 ==
Elections were held on 8 February 2024. Nauman Islam Shaikh won the election with 98,244 votes.

General election 2024: NA-200 Sukkur-I
| Party | Candidate | Votes | % | ±% |
|---|---|---|---|---|
| PPP | Nauman Islam Shaikh | 98,244 | 56.58 | ▲14.15 |
| GDA | Deedar Ali | 41,970 | 24.17 | |
| PTI | Gohar Ali Khoso (Note: Filed nomination papers as PTI candidate but ECP allowed him to run as an Independent) | 19,511 | 11.24 | ▼25.00 |
| Others | Others (twenty-two candidates) | 13,917 | 8.01 | |
| Turnout | | 180,267 | 39.44 | ▼2.96 |
| Total valid votes | | 173,642 | 96.32 | |
| Rejected ballots | | 7,911 | 3.68 | |
| Majority | | 56,274 | 32.41 | ▲26.22 |
| Registered electors | | 457,057 | | |
| PPP hold | | | | |

== See also ==
- NA-199 Ghotki-II
- NA-201 Sukkur-II
