= Ghulam Muhammad Mahar Medical College =

College in Sukkur, Sindh, Pakistan

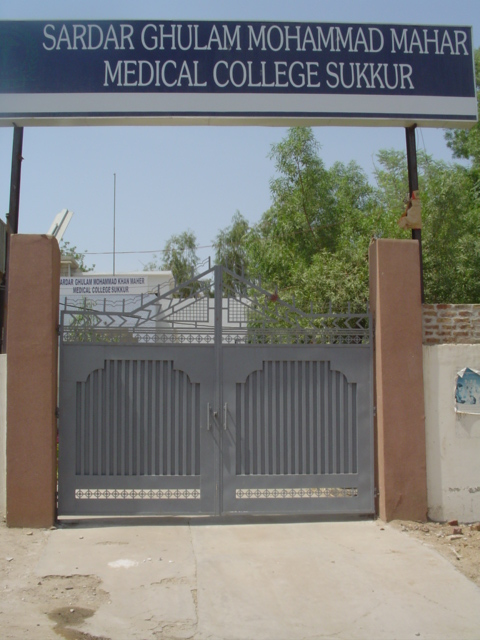
- Main gate of GMMMC old campus
- Motto: To Serve The Ailing Humanity بیمار انسانیت کی خدمت کرنا
- Type: Public Government institute
- Established: September 2003
- Parent institution: Shaheed Mohtarma Benazir Bhutto Medical University
- Affiliations: SMBBMU, PMDC, CPSP, HEC
- Location: Sukkur, Pakistan; 27°42′18.3″N 68°49′50.2″E
- Campus: New campus complex 54 acres (22 ha) Urban
- Mascot: GMCian
- Website: www.gmc-suk.edu.pk

Ghulam Muhammad Mahar Medical College or GMMMC in short is the sixth public sector Medical college under the Government of Sindh where 100 students of Sukkur, Khairpur and Ghotki are getting education every year. It is named after Sindh politician Ghulam Muhammad Khan Mahar.

It is a constituent College of Shaheed Mohtarma Benazir Bhutto Medical University, located in the center of Sukkur city GMMMC is home to 500 students in the MBBS programs, with clinical rotations occurring at GMMMC Teaching Hospital, Government Anwar Piracha Teaching Hospital, SIUT Chablani Medical Center Sukkur, National Institute of Cardiovascular Diseases (NICVD), Sukkur satellite center. The school has a large and experienced faculty to support its mission of education, research, and clinical care. Faculty members hold appointments at basic sciences and clinical departments. There are about 114 full-time faculty members consisting of Lecturers, Assistant Professors, Associate Professors, and Professors at GMMMC.

== History ==
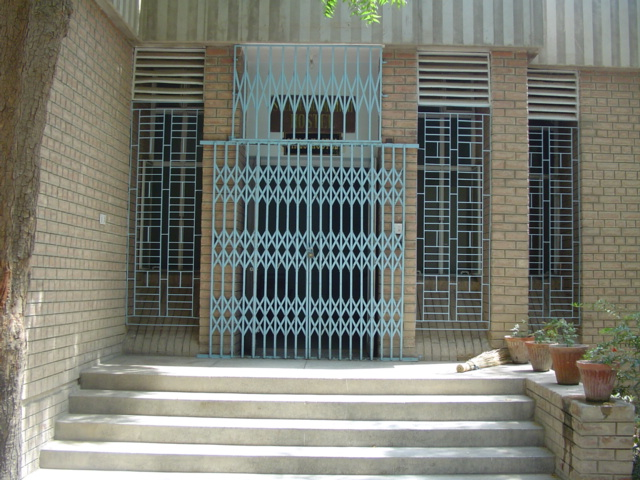
Physiology Department

Presently Sukkur is a medium-sized city with a population of over half a million, sending its children to about twenty five high schools and at least one dozen colleges. With its history, geographical importance and a large number of growing youth, the city was considered for a medical college to provide medical education and tertiary health care facilities for the people of the area. The demand for a medical college in Sukkur was not new. In 2002 the idea of Sukkur as the central point for establishment of a medical college had been gaining ground. On 2 September 2003, the sixth public sector medical college, Sardar Ghulam Muhammad Khan Mahar Medical College Sukkur, was inaugurated by Chief Minister of Sindh Ali Mohammad Mahar in the building of Health Technician School Sukkur. The classes were started for the first batch of 40 students on 15 October 2003. Sardar Ghulam Muhammad Khan Mahar Medical College Sukkur was named after a philanthropist of the area, veteran politician and Chief (Sardar Urdu: سردار) of Mahar (Sindhi tribe), the late Sardar Ghulam Muhammad Khan Mahar. Later on, the college was renamed on 27 December 2005 by shortening its original name to Ghulam Muhammad Mahar Medical College (GMMMC).

== Campus ==
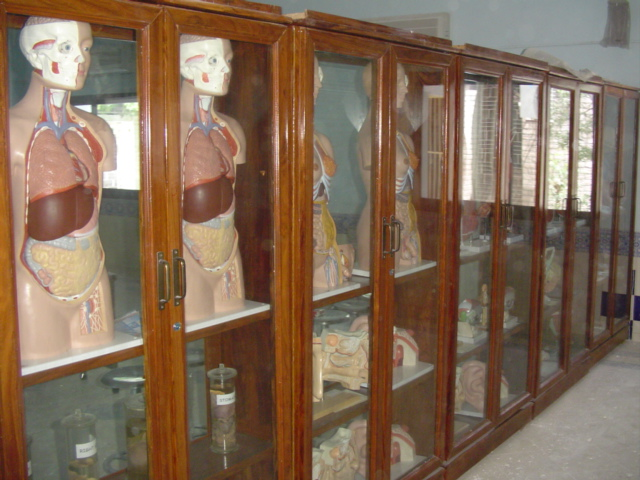
A view of Anatomy Museum in GMMMC Eastern Academic Block 1

Ghulam Muhammad Mahar Medical College Sukkur is established in three beautiful buildings, including the former Directorate of Health Sukkur, the Health Technician School, and the Masoom Shah Hostel of Health Technician School. The medical school building has laboratories, museums and library including the learning resource center (LRC) with access to the Digital Library of the Higher Education Commission through Computers.

=== Library Block ===
Library Building was constructed as separate block in front of Academic Block No. 3. It is a two-story building, the ground floor consists of a final-year lecture hall (lecture Hall No. 4), first-floor reference library, and the second floor has a lending library for students and staff.

=== Academic Blocks ===
There are three academic Blocks in GMMMC.

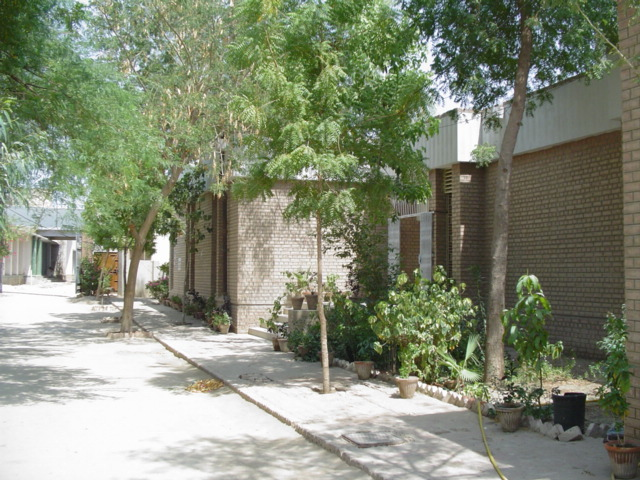
GMMMC Academic Block 1 and 2

- Eastern Academic Block No.1 comprises Anatomy, Physiology, Biochemistry Departments and a lecture hall (Lecture hall No.1)
- Academic Block No. 2 comprises Departments of Pathology and Community Medicine.
- Academic Block No. 3 comprises Department of Pharmacology, Department of Forensic Medicine, Lecture Hall No. 2 and Lecture Hall No. 3, Girls common room; besides that, Administration Block (having the Principal/ Dean of the College Office along with supporting staff offices, Learning Resource Center (LRC), Academic Council Hall) is also located in this block.

=== Hospital Block ===
Children Emergency Room, Ghulam Muhammad Mahar Medical College Hospital – Sukkur was established on Dec 30, 2019 which is a 40-bedded facility covering area of approx. 6300 sq. feet, providing 24/7 free-of-cost emergency services to the residents of Sukkur and its adjoining areas including Rohri, Panoakil, Khairpur, Saleh Pat and Shikarpur.

ChildLife's Emergency Room is equipped with Triage facility for assessment and categorization of patients coming to the ER. Phototherapy Units, Cardiac Monitors and Infusion Pumps are available for the patients care.

== New Complex ==
The 53.8 Acres of land was acquired for GMMMC Complex at the Sukkur Bypass, connecting main national highway N-5 National Highway (Karachi - Lahore - Islamabad - Peshawar) with N-65 National Highway (Sukkur - Quetta) bypassing the congested urban roads in the city of Sukkur. The new Complex will house (ان شاء الله) Buildings for, Medical College, Student Hostels, Residential Quarters for faculty and supporting staff, and 1200 bedded Teaching hospital. The foundation stone of the Complex was laid by the then Chief Minister of Sindh Arbab Ghulam Rahim on 30 May 2005. The private consultancy firm has designed the Master Plan (the detailed drawing) of the Project, and is currently supervising the construction work in the new complex which is in full swing and according to assistant engineer of the college, the construction work of new block will be completed soon.

== Hostels Block ==
Girl's Hostel: The construction work of a Girls' Hostel has been completed and now it is functional. According to assistant engineer of the GMMMC project there were 90 rooms in the girls’ hostel where about 270 students are residing . The girls' hostel has been named as Begum Nusrat Bhutto Female Students' Hostel.

Boy's Hostel: . The male students reside in the designated Boys Hostel, which is located on-campus and provides a convenient, secure environment close to the college's academic buildings and hospital.

=== Key Details & Amenities ===
- Location: Situated within the college campus in Sukkur, allowing students to easily reach their classes and clinical rotations.
- Accommodation: The rooms are generally shared (e.g., double or quad) and are equipped with basic living furniture like beds, study tables, and wardrobes.
- Mess/Dining: There is a dedicated hostel mess managed by a student committee. They typically hold weekly meetings to decide the menu based on student preferences, providing meals tailored to the students.
- Facilities: The premises generally include common areas, indoor sports/gym facilities, and grounds for recreation.
- Security: Gated and secure, providing a safe residential environment suitable for medical students.

== Recognition ==
Pakistan Medical & Dental Council Islamabad inspected Ghulam Muhammad Mahar Medical College Sukkur on 25 April 2008 and thoroughly re-inspected it on 22 November 2008. At the best of satisfaction the team recommended GMMMMC for registration. Federal Ministry of Health Government of Pakistan Islamabad has notified it as recognized Medical College. Now GMMMC is fully recognized by the PMDC, Higher Education Commission of Pakistan (HEC), and the World Health Organization (WHO). The College of Physicians and Surgeons of Pakistan has recognized its Teaching Hospitals for post-graduate training leading to FCPS and MCPS degrees in different disciplines of Medicine and surgery.

== Departments ==
- Basic medical sciences
  - Anatomy
  - Physiology
  - Biochemistry
  - Pharmacology
  - Forensic Medicine
  - Pathology
  - Community Medicine
- Medicine and allied
  - Internal Medicine
  - Pediatrics
  - Cardiology
  - Neurology
  - Psychiatry
  - Nephrology
  - Dermatology
- Surgery and allied
  - General Surgery
  - Obstetrics and Gynecology
  - Orthopedics
  - Ophthalmology
  - Otorhinolaryngology (ENT)
  - Cardiac Surgery
- Surgery and allied (Cont.)
  - Pediatric Surgery
  - Anesthesiology
  - Urology
  - Neurosurgery
  - Radiology
  - Oncology

== Education ==
=== Undergraduate ===
- A five-year program of Bachelor of Medicine, Bachelor of Surgery (MBBS)

=== Postgraduate ===
- Fellow of College of Physicians and Surgeons Pakistan (FCPS).
- Member of College of Physicians and Surgeons Pakistan (MCPS)

== Attached Teaching Hospitals ==
- GMMMC Teaching Hospital, Sukkur
- Government Anwar Piracha Teaching Hospital, Sukkur
- SIUT Chablani Medical Center Sukkur
- National Institute of Cardiovascular Diseases (NICVD), Sukkur satellite center
- Child Healthcare Institute Sukkur

== Admission ==
A student is eligible to apply after a Higher Secondary School Certificate (HSSC)/ A Level/ any other Equivalent examination. Candidates are selected by a rigorous admission process that includes a competitive centralized National Medical and Dental College Admission Test (MDCAT) conducted by NTS annually. Merit is determined by the marks obtained on the MDCAT, HSSC/ A Level/ Equivalent examination and SSC/ O Level/ Equivalent examination.

== See also ==
- Ghulam Muhammad Khan Mahar
- Shaheed Mohtarma Benazir Bhutto Medical University
