= NA-199 Ghotki-II =

Constituency of the National Assembly of Pakistan

- Constituency for the National Assembly of Pakistan
- Region: Ghotki and Khangarh Tehsils and Mirpur Mathelo Tehsil (partly) of Ghotki District
- Electorate: 455,376

Current constituency
- Party: Pakistan People's Party
- Member: Ali Gohar Khan Mahar
- Created from: NA-201 Ghotki-II

NA-199 Ghotki-II (این اے-199، گھوٹکی-2) is a constituency for the National Assembly of Pakistan.

== Assembly Segments ==
Constituency number	Constituency	District	Current MPA	Party
20	PS-20 Ghotki-III	Ghotki District	Sardar Muhammad Bakhsh Khan Mahar	PPP
21	PS-21 Ghotki-IV	Ghotki District	Ali Nawaz Khan Mahar	PPP

== Election 2002 ==
General elections were held on 10 October 2002. Ali Mohammad Mahar of PPP won by 77,950 votes.

General election 2002: NA-201 Ghotki-II
Party	Candidate	Votes	%	±%
Independent	Ali Mohammad Khan Mahar	77,950	74.40	
MMA	Ghulam Rasool Kalhoro	18,115	17.29	
Others	Others (thirteen candidates)	8,710	8.31	
Turnout		109,059	38.20	
Total valid votes		104,775	96.07	
Rejected ballots		4,284	3.93	
Majority		59,835	57.11	
Registered electors		285,481		

== By-election 2003 ==
By-election 2003: NA-201 Ghotki-II
Party	Candidate	Votes	%	±%
PML(Q)	Ali Nawaz Khan Mehar	176,188	97.03	
PPP	Abdul Latif Shah	3,120	1.72	
Independent	Muhammad Yaqoob	2,283	1.25	
Turnout		183,055	64.12	
Total valid votes		181,591	99.20	
Rejected ballots		1,464	0.80	
Majority		173,068	95.31	
Registered electors		285,481		

== Election 2008 ==
General elections were held on 18 February 2008. Ali Mohammad Mahar, an independent politician won by 74,714 votes.

General election 2008: NA-201 Ghotki-II
Party	Candidate	Votes	%	±%
Independent	Ali Mohammad Khan Mahar	74,714	58.63	
PPP	Sardar Ahmed Khan Alias Fayyaz Ali Khan	51,894	40.72	
Others	Others (eight candidates)	832	0.65	
Turnout		131,443	46.60	
Total valid votes		127,440	96.96	
Rejected ballots		4,003	3.04	
Majority		22,820	17.91	
Registered electors		282,085		
Independent gain from PPP				

== Election 2013 ==
General elections were held on 11 May 2013. Ali Mohammad Mahar of PPP won by 124,472 votes and became the member of National Assembly.

General election 2013: NA-201 Ghotki-II
Party	Candidate	Votes	%	±%
PPP	Ali Mohammad Khan Mahar	124,472	79.49	
PML(F)	Abdul Razzaque	25,768	16.46	
Others	Others (twelve candidates)	6,349	4.05	
Turnout		161,663	58.49	
Total valid votes		156,589	96.86	
Rejected ballots		5,074	3.14	
Majority		98,704	63.03	
Registered electors		276,383		
PPP hold				

== Election 2018 ==
General elections were held on 25 July 2018.

General election 2018: NA-205 Ghotki-II
Party	Candidate	Votes	%	±%
Independent	Ali Mohammad Mahar	72,082	45.65	
PPP	Ahsanullah Sundrani	41,855	26.51	
MMA	Abdul Qayoom	37,010	23.44	
Others	Others (six candidates)	6,959	4.41	
Turnout		171,420	50.46	
Total valid votes		157,906	92.12	
Rejected ballots		13,514	7.88	
Majority		30,227	19.14	
Registered electors		339,699		
Independent gain from PPP				

== By-election 2019 ==
The seat had fallen vacant following the death of former federal minister and father of Ahmad Ali, Ali Mohammad Khan Mahar.

By-election 2019: NA-205 Ghotki-II
Party	Candidate	Votes	%	±%
PPP	Sardar Muhammad Bakhsh Khan Mahar	89,359	53.21	▲26.70
Independent	Ahmed Ali Khan Mahar	70,848	42.19	
Independent	Haji Khan Mahar	1,708	1.02	
Independent	Imdad Ali	1,482	0.88	
Independent	Ahsanullah	1,387	0.83	
Independent	Zafar UI Huda Siddiqui	1,186	0.71	
Independent	Abdul Bari Pitafi	889	0.53	
Independent	Bandul Khan Mahar	710	0.42	
Independent	Ikramullah Khan	352	0.21	
Turnout		173,953	48.20	▼2.26
Total valid votes		167,921	96.53	
Rejected ballots		6,032	3.47	
Majority		18,511	11.02	
Registered electors		360,875		
PPP gain from Independent				

== Election 2024 ==
Elections were held on 8 February 2024. Ali Gohar Khan Mahar won the election with 154,832 votes.

General election 2024: NA-199 Ghotki-II
Party	Candidate	Votes	%	±%
PPP	Ali Gohar Khan Mahar	154,832	75.25	▲22.04
JUI (F)	Abdul Qayoom	40,204	19.54	
Others	Others (seven candidates)	10,711	5.21	
Turnout		213,658	46.92	▼1.28
Total valid votes		205,747	96.30	
Rejected ballots		7,911	3.70	
Majority		114,628	55.71	▲44.69
Registered electors		455,376		
PPP hold				

== See also ==
- NA-198 Ghotki-I
- NA-200 Sukkur-I
