= Jhalar Maharan =

Jhalar Maharan جھلارمہاراں
- Village
- Location within Punjab, Pakistan Location within Pakistan
- Coordinates: 31°36′15″N 73°47′01″E

Area
  - Total: 10 km^{2} (3.9 sq mi)
- Elevation: 236 m (774 ft)
  - Density: 126/km^{2} (330/sq mi)
- Time zone: UTC+5 (PST)

Jhalar Maharan is a village located in east of Ferozewattowan, Sheikhupura, in Pakistan. The town has a population of 2000, mostly farmers. The person whose name is at the top among the celebrities of Jhalar Maharan needs no introduction, his name is Hajji Muhammad Younis Mahaar son of Hajji Abdul Rahman Mahaar . The sting of his personality can be heard in his village Jhalar Maharan through his principles, words and actions.

== History ==
The town was named after Mahar Tribe people who moved here from Bahawalpur after a clash with The Nawabs of Land.

== Peoples ==
Most of the people living here belong to a farming/cattle rearing backgrounds hence they are mostly farmers and cattle rearers.

The tribes of village include Mahaar, Wattoo, Haral. Only one house belongs to Watto family and one house belongs to Haral family. The rest of the village belongs to the Mahaar community.

== Administration ==
The village is administered by Ferozewattwan's union council which is a subbody of Sheikhupura's Tehsil Administration. The village also has a "Kisan" Counselor.
