= Ali Gohar Khan Mahar =

Pakistani politician

Sardar Ali Gohar Khan Mahar
- سردار علي گوھر خان مھر

Member of the National Assembly of Pakistan
- Incumbent
- Assumed office 29 February 2024
- Constituency: NA-199 Ghotki-II
- In office 1 June 2013 – 31 May 2018
- Constituency: NA-200 (Ghotki-I)

Member of the Provincial Assembly of Sindh
- In office 13 August 2018 – 11 August 2023
- Constituency: PS-20 Ghotki-III
- In office 18 October 1993 – 7 November 1996
- Constituency: PS-3 (Ghotki-III)
- In office 20 February 1997 – 12 October 1999
- Constituency: PS-3 (Ghotki-III)

Personal details
- Born: 9 February 1968 (age 58) Ghotki, Sindh, Pakistan
- Party: PPP (2023)
- Other political affiliations: GDA (2018–2023)
- Relatives: Ali Mohammad Mahar (brother); Ali Nawaz Khan Mehar (brother)

Ali Gohar Khan Mahar (Sindhi: سردار علي گوھر خان مھر;Urdu: سردار علی گوہر خان مہر; born 1 September 1968) is a Pakistani politician who had been a member of the National Assembly of Pakistan since February 2024 and previously served in this position from June 2013 to May 2018. He had been a member of the Provincial Assembly of Sindh from August 2018 till August 2023 and from 1993 to 1999.

== Early life and family ==
He was born on 1 September 1968.

He is the brother of Ali Nawaz Khan Mehar and Ali Mohammad Mahar.

== Political career ==
He ran for the seat of the Provincial Assembly of Sindh as an independent candidate from Constituency PS-3 (Sukkur-III) in the 1990 Pakistani general election but was unsuccessful. He received 90 votes and lost the seat to an independent candidate, Ali Anwar Khan.

He was elected to the Provincial Assembly of Sindh as a candidate of Pakistan Muslim League (N) (PML-N) from Constituency PS-3 (Ghotki-III) in the 1993 Pakistani general election. He received 26,853 votes and defeated Mehboob Ali Shah, a candidate of Pakistan Peoples Party (PPP).

He was re-elected to the Provincial Assembly of Sindh as a candidate of PPP from Constituency PS-3 (Ghotki-III) in the 1997 Pakistani general election. He received 28,472 votes and defeated Umeed Ali Chachar.

In June 2006, he was re-elected as District Nazim of Ghotki.

He ran for the seat of the National Assembly of Pakistan and Provincial Assembly of Sindh as an independent candidate from Constituency NA-201 (Ghotki-II) and from Constituency PS-8 (Ghotki-IV), respectively in the 2013 Pakistani general election, but was unsuccessful. He received 569 votes from Constituency NA-201 (Ghotki-II) and lose the seat to Ali Mohammad Mahar. He received 17 votes from Constituency PS-8 (Ghotki-IV) and lost the seat to Muhammad Bux Khan Mahar. In the same election, he was elected to the National Assembly as a candidate of PPP from Constituency NA-200 (Ghotki-I). He received 86,579 votes and defeated an independent candidate, Khalid Ahmed Khan Lund.

He was re-elected to Provincial Assembly of Sindh as a candidate of the Grand Democratic Alliance (GDA) from PS-20 Ghotki-III in the 2018 Sindh provincial election.

He was re-elected to the National Assembly from NA-199 Ghotki-II as a candidate of PPP in the 2024 Pakistani general election. He received 154,832 votes and defeated Abdul Qayoom, a candidate of Jamiat Ulema-e-Islam (F) (JUI(F)).
