= PS-24 Sukkur-III =

Constituency of the Provincial Assembly of Sindh, Pakistan

- Constituency for the Provincial Assembly of Sindh
- Region: Sukkur city area of Sukkur District
- Electorate: 222,680

Current constituency
- Member: Vacant
- Created from: PS-1 Sukkur-I

PS-24 Sukkur-III (پی ایس-24، سکھر-3) is a constituency of the Provincial Assembly of Sindh.

== General elections 2024 ==
Provincial election 2024: PS-24 Sukkur-III
Party	Candidate	Votes	%	±%
PPP	Syed Farukh Ahmed Shah	41,235	54.27	
Independent	Mubeen Ahmed	19,623	25.83	
PTI	Safia (Note: Filed nomination papers as PTI candidate but ECP allowed him to run as an independent)	5,730	7.54	
JI	Muhammad Zubair Hafeez	2,021	2.66	
PRHP	Rasheed Ahmed Shah	1,649	2.17	
Independent	Muhammad Shakeel	1,028	1.35	
TLP	Muhammad Qayyum	948	1.25	
Others	Others (twenty five candidates)	3,741	4.93	
Turnout		78,417	36.82	
Total valid votes		75,975	96.89	
Rejected ballots		2,442	3.11	
Majority		21,612	28.44	
Registered electors		212,962		

== General elections 2018 ==
Contesting candidates	Party affiliation	Votes polled

== General elections 2013 ==
Contesting candidates	Party affiliation	Votes polled

== General elections 2008 ==
Contesting candidates	Party affiliation	Votes polled

== See also ==
- PS-23 Sukkur-II
- PS-25 Sukkur-IV
