= Ghullah Wattwan =

Ghullah Wattwan گہلہ وٹواں
- Village
- Location within Punjab, Pakistan Location within Pakistan
- Coordinates: 30°9′38″N 71°26′48″E

Area
  - Total: 23 km^{2} (8.9 sq mi)
- Elevation: 359 m (1,178 ft)
  - Density: 356/km^{2} (920/sq mi)
- Time zone: UTC+5 (PST)

Ghullah Wattwan is a town located to the east of Feroze Wattwan in Sheikhupura District, Pakistan. The town has a population of 10,000, mostly farmers and constructors.

== History ==
Watto is rajpoot cast, Since 1998 watto has converted with 2 section behind the fight for lands, Some Watto's are moved in other place and they were make the different place with different name, their name chosen is Ghullah Wattwan.

== People ==
Most people who live here are farmers, shopkeepers, govt servants and constructors. Ghullah Wattwan Tribes are Wattoo Rajpoot, Rana Rajpoot, Arain, Bhatti, and Rai / Kharal.

== Administration ==
Ghullah Wattwan is administrated in the Fereoze Wattwan union council which is sub-city of Sheikhupura's Tehsil Administration.
