= PS-22 Sukkur-I =

Constituency of the Provincial Assembly of Sindh, Pakistan

- Constituency for the Provincial Assembly of Sindh
- Region: Pano Aqil Tehsil (partly) and Rohri Tehsil (partly) of Sukkur District
- Electorate: 185,871

Current constituency
- Member: Vacant
- Created from: PS-3 Sukkur-III

PS-22 Sukkur-I (پی ایس-22، سکھر-1) is a constituency of the Provincial Assembly of Sindh.

== General elections 2024 ==
Provincial election 2024: PS-22 Sukkur-I
| Party | Candidate | Votes | % | ±% |
|---|---|---|---|---|
| PPP | Ikramullah Khan Dharejo | 41,828 | 49.06 | |
| JUI (F) | Muhammad Mubeen | 40,035 | 46.96 | |
| Others | Others (twelve candidates) | 3,394 | 3.98 | |
| Turnout | | 90,674 | 48.78 | |
| Total valid votes | | 85,257 | 94.03 | |
| Rejected ballots | | 5,417 | 5.97 | |
| Majority | | 1,793 | 2.10 | |
| Registered electors | | 185,871 | | |

== General elections 2018 ==
| Contesting candidates | Party affiliation | Votes polled |

== General elections 2013 ==
| Contesting candidates | Party affiliation | Votes polled |

== General elections 2008 ==
| Contesting candidates | Party affiliation | Votes polled |

== See also ==
- PS-21 Ghotki-IV
- PS-23 Sukkur-II
