= Mando Dairo railway station =

Railway station in Pakistan

Mando Dairo Railway Station مندو ڈیرو ریلوے اسٹیشن مندو ديرو ريلوي اسٽيشن

General information
- Coordinates: 27.6804°N 68.9814°E
- Owner: Ministry of Railways
- Line: Karachi–Peshawar Railway Line

Other information
- Station code: MDZ

Services
| Preceding station | Pakistan Railways | Following station |
|---|---|---|
| Rohri Junction towards Kiamari | Karachi–Peshawar Line | Sangi towards Peshawar Cantonment |
Location

Mando Dairo Railway Station (Urdu: مندو ڈیرو ریلوے اسٹیشن, Sindhi: مندو دیرو ریلوي اسٽیشن) is located in Mando Dairo village, Sukkur district of Sindh province, Pakistan.

== See also ==
- List of railway stations in Pakistan
- Pakistan Railways
