= Sangi railway station =

Railway station in Pakistan

Sangi Railway Station سانگی ریلوے اسٹیشن سانگي ريلوي اسٽيشن

General information
- Coordinates: 27.7588°N 69.0545°E
- Owner: Ministry of Railways
- Line: Karachi–Peshawar Railway Line

Other information
- Station code: SGI

Services
Preceding station	Pakistan Railways	Following station
Mando Dairo towards Kiamari	Karachi–Peshawar Line	Pano Akil towards Peshawar Cantonment
Location

Sangi / Sanghi Railway Station (Urdu: سانگی ریلوے اسٹیشن, Sindhi: سانگي ریلوي اسٽیشن) is located in Sangi village, Sukkur district of Sindh province, Pakistan.

== See also ==
- List of railway stations in Pakistan
- Pakistan Railways
