= Mahar (tribe) =

Sindhi tribe

Regions with significant populations
- Pakistan

Languages
- Sindhi

Religion
- Islam

Related ethnic groups
- Sindhi people

Mahar (Sindhi: مھر) is a Sindhi Sammat tribe found in Sindh and Punjab provinces of Pakistan and Jaisalmer, in the state of Rajasthan, in India.

They were among the freedom fighters against the British Raj, known as (Hur Mujahids). They live in India, to Jamshoro, Pakistan, which includes the Thar desert and more than half of Sindh.The Mahars have the proper Sardari system Currently The Mahar family today lives in Ghotki, Sindh, Pakistan; they still follow their traditions and have a sea of people following them. The Mahars are a politically active and influential tribe.

== Clans ==
The Mahar is a tribe of Sindhi Sammats. The clans of Mahar tribe are: Ansani, Bakira, Baipar, Bamuja, Baga, Bagra, Bakherani, Baghal, Bakhupota, Bhaikhairani, Buja, Balha/Bulha, Baman, Banbal, Bunblia, Bālani, Banbha/Bhanbha, Bijal, Chanar, Chahara, Chubra, Chhapra, Chhatta/Chhutta, Cheena, Chohra, Chelaria, Chanujo/Chaneja, Derajo, Daheja, Data, Dita, Dedla, Deengra, Eukhnani, Gadan, Gāgnani, Gajnani, Gumna, Ghana, Haseja, Heesja, Hathi, Hathipotra, Harha, Hala, Jesraja, Janga, Jiand, Jedha, Jeesar, Jeesarja, Khiani, Kabra, Khayalani, Lādar/Ladhar, Lanjari/Linjari, Lodha, Lodra, Langani/Longani, Lachi, Lāo, Lalepotra, Lalang, Matooja, Mahlani, Mahalani, Māka, Māri, Mārij, Mubah, Māreja, Mārecha, Mihlani, Minhani, Menuhani, Marfat, Mahrich, Mathera, Matrija, Munhja, Manhija, Mahzol, Muradani, Marupotra, Motani, Ninjah, Nunhja, Nareja, Nangreja, Nidamani, Nizamani, Naija, Nangwa, Nosakhja, Rukhnani/Rakrani, Raipar/Repar, Ramuja/Rameja, Sakhi, Sakpala,Sakhija/Sukhija, Sahija, Soomarja, Sakhera, Soomrani, Sakhirani, Sakhani, Sajani, Sawai, Sabuja, Sahāna, Sādor, Tamachani, Tughani, Tanghani, Talani, Unsani, Winiha, Wanjha/Winjha, Wijal, Waharkia, Wahria, Wains, Wechal and Parocha.

=== Sardar/Chief ===
Headship or Sardari went to Khiani clan of Khangarh Sharif. Sardar or Chief the whole Mahar tribe is Sardar Mohammad Bux Khan Mahar as he was the oldest son of the last chief, Al-Hajj Sardar Ghulam Muhammad Khan Mahar.

== Notable people ==
- Ali Gohar Khan Mahar (born 1968), Pakistani politician.
- Ali Nawaz Khan Mahar (born 1972), Pakistani politician.
- Ali Mohammad Mahar (1967–2019), Pakistani politician.
- Muhammad Bux Khan Mahar Pakistani politician.
- Ghulam Muhammad Khan Mahar (died 1995), Pakistani politician and philanthropist.
- Sardar Muhammad Bakhsh Khan Mahar Pakistani politician.
- Ghos Bakhsh Khan Mahar (born 1945), Pakistani politician.
- Razzaq Mahar (1954–2002), Pakistani writer and columnist.
