= Khurshid Shah =

Pakistani politician

- خورشید شاہ
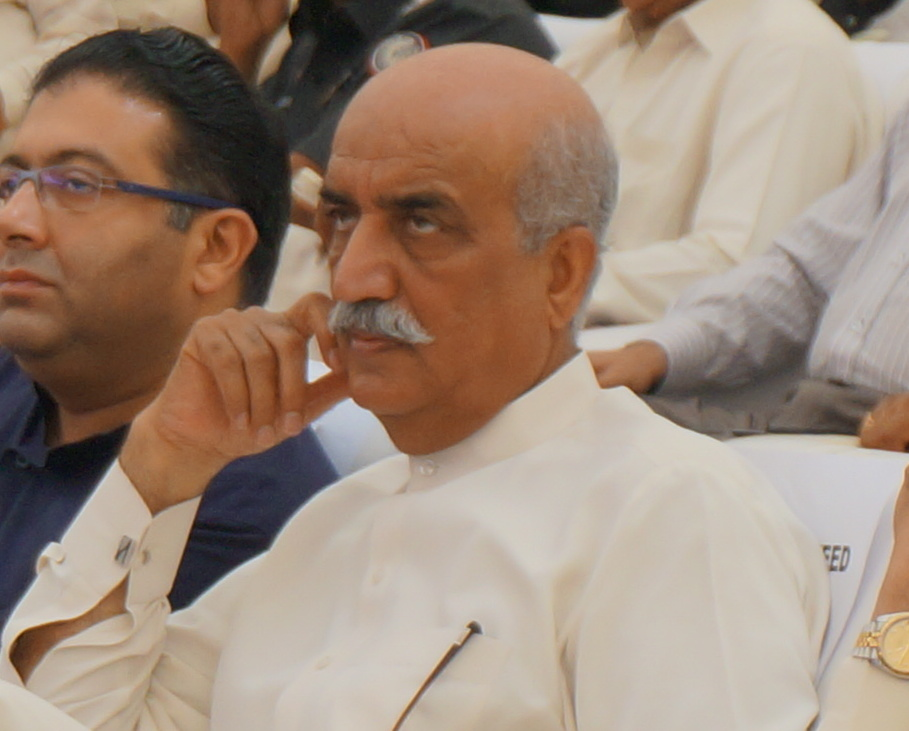

Leader of the Opposition
- In office 7 June 2013 – 31 May 2018
- President: Asif Ali Zardari; Mamnoon Hussain
- Prime Minister: Nawaz Sharif; Shahid Khaqan Abbasi
- Preceded by: Chaudhary Nisar Ali Khan
- Succeeded by: Shehbaz Sharif

Federal Minister For Water Resources
- In office 18 April 2022 – 10 August 2023
- President: Arif Alvi
- Prime Minister: Shehbaz Sharif

Federal Minister for Religious Affairs
- In office December 2010 – 2013
- President: Asif Ali Zardari
- Prime Minister: Yusuf Raza Gillani; Raja Pervaiz Ashraf
- Preceded by: Hamid Saeed Kazmi
- Succeeded by: Sardar Muhammad Yousuf

Federal Minister for Labour and Manpower
- In office 31 March 2008 – May 2011
- President: Asif Ali Zardari
- Prime Minister: Yusuf Raza Gillani

Federal Minister for Education
- In office 1993–1996
- President: Farooq Leghari
- Prime Minister: Benazir Bhutto
- Succeeded by
Parliamentary positions
Member of the National Assembly of Pakistan
Incumbent
Assumed office 29 February 2024
Constituency	NA-201 Sukkur-II
In office 13 August 2018 – 10 August 2023
Constituency	NA-206 (Sukkur-I)
In office 17 March 2008 – 31 May 2018
Constituency	NA-199 (Sukkur-II)
In office 18 November 2002 – 18 November 2007
Constituency	NA-198 (Sukkur-I)
In office 3 November 1990 – 12 October 1999
Constituency	Sukkur

Personal details
- Born: 20 April 1952 (age 74) Sukkur, Sindh, Pakistan
- Party: PPP (1990–present)
- Children: Syed Farukh Ahmed Shah (son)
- Education: MA, LLB
- Alma mater: Government Islamia Science College Sukkur
- Profession: Lawyer, Politician

Syed Khurshid Ahmed Shah (Urdu, Sindhi: سید خورشید احمد شاہ; born 13 November 1954) is a Pakistani politician and lawyer who has been a member of the National Assembly of Pakistan since February 2024 and previously served in this position from August 2018 till August 2023 and between 1990 and May 2018.

He served as the Leader of the Opposition in the National Assembly of Pakistan from June 2013 to May 2018. A leader of the Pakistan Peoples Party (PPP), Shah was born in Sukkur and was educated at the Government Islamia Science College Sukkur.

He served as the Leader of the Opposition in the National Assembly of Pakistan from June 2013 to May 2018. A leader of the Pakistan Peoples Party (PPP), Shah was born in Sukkur and was educated at the Government Islamia Science College Sukkur.

Shah began his political career as the member of the Provincial Assembly of Sindh in 1988 and had been a member of the provincial cabinet, in various positions. He has been inducted into the federal cabinet thrice between 1993 and 2013. From 2012 to 2013, he also served as the parliament.

On 18 September 2019, the National Accountability Bureau (NAB) on Wednesday arrested senior PPP leader Syed Khursheed Shah in a case regarding his alleged assets beyond means. On 21 October 2021, Supreme Court released him on bail.

== Early life and education ==
Shah was born on 20 April 1952. He completed his education from Government Islamia Science College, Sukkur. He received his master's degree in History in 1974 and his LLB in 1978, both from Islamia College, Sukkur. Shah is a professional lawyer and a businessman.

== Political career ==
Shah began his political career after becoming a member of the Provincial Assembly of Sindh for the first time in 1988 from Sukkur constituency on the Pakistan Peoples Party ticket, after which he became member of the provincial cabinet, in various positions. He served as the Minister for Education, Minister for transport, Minister for Import, Minister for Finance and Minister for Information.

Shah was elected as the member of the National Assembly for the first time in 1990 from Sukkur constituency. Shah was elected as the member of the National Assembly for the second time in 1993 from Sukkur constituency. Shah was inducted into federal cabinet in 1993 and was appointed as a Minister for Education in Benazir Bhutto's second ministry. Shah was re-elected as the member of the National Assembly for the third time in 1997 from Sukkur constituency. Shah was elected as the member of the National Assembly for the fourth time in 2002 from Sukkur constituency.

In 2012, Shah became chairman of the parliamentary committee on appointment of the Chief Election Commissioner of Pakistan. Shah was re-elected as the member of the National Assembly for the fifth time in 2008 from Sukkur constituency. Shah was inducted into the federal cabinet after the 2008 Pakistani elections and was appointed as a Minister for Labour, Manpower and Overseas Pakistanis from March 2008 to May 2011. Minister for Labour, Manpower and Overseas Pakistanis was divided into two ministries in 2009, and Shah remained with Minister for Labour and Manpower. He was given the additional portfolio of Minister for Religious Affairs, where he served from December 2010 to 2013, both in the Gillani ministry. Shah was the parliamentarian leader of PPP in the National Assembly from 2008 to 2013.

Shah, along with leaders of other political parties, was tasked with selection on the name for caretaker prime minister of Pakistan prior to the 2013 Pakistan election. Shah was re-elected as the member of the National Assembly for the sixth time in 2013 from second Sukkur constituency. Shah was a potential candidate to become Prime Minister of Pakistan after Yousaf Raza Gillani was disqualified from holding the office. In June 2013, Shah was appointed as the Leader of the Opposition in National Assembly by PPP. Shah is also chairman of the Public Accounts Committee in the National Assembly. Shah is said to have good relations with the leaders of other political parties in Pakistan.

He was re-elected to the National Assembly as a candidate of PPP from NA-206 (Sukkur-I) in 2018. Following his successful election, PPP nominated him for the office of Speaker of the National Assembly of Pakistan. He received 146 votes and lost the election to Asad Qaiser who received 176 votes.

He was re-elected to the National Assembly as a candidate of PPP from NA-201 Sukkur-II in the 2024 Pakistani general election. He received 121,566 votes and defeated Muhammad Saleh Indhar, a candidate of Jamiat Ulema-e-Islam (F) (JUI(F)).

Political offices
Preceded by Nisar Ali Khan	Leader of the Opposition; 2013 –	Incumbent
Preceded by Hamid Saeed Kazmi	Federal Minister for Religious Affairs; 2010–2013	Succeeded by Sardar Muhammad Yousuf
Preceded by	Federal Minister for Labour and Manpower; 2008–2011	Succeeded by
Preceded by	Federal Minister for Education; 1993–1996	Succeeded by
