= Ghulam Muhammad Khan Mahar =

Pakistani politician (died 1995)

Sardar Ghulam Muhammad Khan Mahar
- سردار غلام محمد خان مهر
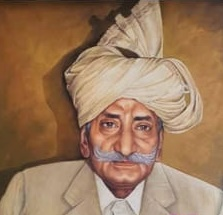

Sardar (Chief) of the Maher tribe and Politician

Personal details
- Born: Sukkur, Sindh, Pakistan
- Died: 9 April 1995

Sardar Ghulam Muhammad Khan Mahar (Sindhi: سردار غلام محمد خان مهر; Urdu: سردار غلام محمد خان مهر) was chief of the Mahar tribe, and a prominent politician and philanthropist of the Sukkur District. He was first elected as a member of National Assembly of Pakistan in 1964. He became senator in 1973 with the Pakistan Peoples Party (PPP). He was elected a member of the National Assembly in 1977 general elections as the PPP candidate from NA-152 Sukkur II, he was elected Chairman District Council Sukkur in 1979 and remained until 1983. He was Minister for Agriculture when General Muhammad Zia-ul-Haq was the Martial Law Administrator. He won general elections of March 1985 as an independent candidate, and remained Minister of State for Health from 22 December 1986 to 29 May 1988 in Prime Minister of Pakistan Muhammad Khan Junejo's cabinet. In 1988, post Gen Muhammad Zia-ul-Haq era elections, he was defeated by Pakistan Peoples Party (PPP's) candidate Mian Abdul Haq Alias Mian Mitho. He became a member of National Assembly once again in October 1993 by contesting general elections from NA-152 as the candidate of Pakistan Muslim League (N) and afterward he died in April 1995.

== Sardar Mahar ==
He became sardar of Mahar tribe at the age of 37. He was involved in politics from 1964 to 1995, and during that period he became federal minister for several times. Khan died on 9 April 1995. After his death, his elder son Muhammad Bux Khan Mahar Minister of Sports Government of Sindh became the "Sardar" of Mahar tribe. SGM Sugar mill in village Waloo Mahar near Ghotki and Ghulam Muhammad Mahar Medical College in Sukkur were named after him.

== See also ==
- Ghulam Muhammad Mahar Medical College Sukkur
