= Murder of Namrita Chandani =

2019 murder in Pakistan

Namrita Chandani
- Born: Sindh, Pakistan
- Died: 16 September 2019; Ghotki

Namrita Chandani also known as Namrita Amarta Maher Chandani or Namrita Kumari, was a Sindhi Hindu girl from Mirpur Mathelo, Ghotki, Sindh, Pakistan. She was a final year student at Bibi Asifa Dental College Larkana when she was found dead in her hostel room on 16 September 2019.

There was wide speculation about the cause of her death. Initially, the institute and local police claimed the cause of death to be suicide, however, the family claims that she was murdered. Fingerprint samples and Chandani's scarf were then sent to The National Database and Registration Authority (NADRA) but this investigation did not yield any substantial findings and so could not conclude a cause of death.

The post-mortem performed pointed that she had been raped. A later autopsy report commissioned by the Sindh High Court found evidence of murder and sexual assault. This report also showed that she was asphyxiated to death by strangulation with a rope. This purported chain of events was based on evidence of male DNA on her clothes and body. Vaginal swab examination showed evidence of sexual contact.

== Death ==
Doctors revealed that there was a choking mark by wire on her neck. Police said that the girl may have committed suicide but her brother Vishal told the media he was convinced that his sister was murdered. He also appealed to the public to stand up for them as they are indeed a minority in Pakistan The university vice-chancellor Anila told the media that Chandani's room was locked. She further added that the actual cause of death is yet to be confirmed. According to the post-mortem report, no marks of torture have been found on the body. SSP Larkana is investigating the incident and has sealed her room for further investigation. It is suspected by some that Chandani might have been a victim of murder by fellow students. An investigation is looking into the leaked medical paper which Chandani opposed and raised her voice for. Prime Minister Imran Khan ordered a judicial inquiry into the murder of Chandani.

According to initial police reports, Chandani wanted to marry classmate Mehran Abro, but his parents refused. Later, Sindh police arrested Mehran Abro and Ali Shah Memon, following a new autopsy report showing evidence of strangulation and DNA evidence of rape.

== Protest ==
In the wake of the incident people from Sindh protested on behalf of Namrita Chandani. The murder caused widespread anger and led to demands that the government form a Judicial Commission.
