= Ministry of Narcotics Control (Pakistan) =

Government ministry of Pakistan

- وزارتِ سدِّ بابِ منشیات

Agency overview
- Formed: 4 August 2017; 9 years ago
- Jurisdiction: Government of Pakistan
- Headquarters: Islamabad, Islamabad Capital Territory
- Minister responsible: Abdul Aleem Khanzada, Minister for Narcotics Control
- Agency executive: Akbar Hussain Durrani, Federal Secretary for Narcotics Control
- Website: www.narcon.gov.pk

The Ministry of Narcotics Control (Urdu: وزارتِ انسدادِ منشیات, romanized: vizārat-e-insidād-e-munaśśiyāt) was the Pakistan Government's federal and executive level ministry created on 4 August 2017 by Shahid Khaqan Abbasi (the then Prime Minister of Pakistan). The ministry was created out of the Ministry of Interior and Narcotics Control (now just Ministry of Interior). Its sole agency or unit is the Anti-Narcotics Force.

It has been merged with the Ministry of Interior as of 11 February 2025.

== Ministers ==
No.	Portrait	Name (Born–Died)	Tenure			Party	Government	Prime Minister
No.	Portrait	Name (Born–Died)	From	To	Length	Party	Government	Prime Minister
1		Lieutenant General (Retd); Salahuddin Tirmizi (born 1943); Senator for Khyber Pakhtunkhwa	4 August 2017	31 May 2018	300 days	PMLN	Abbasi government	Shahid Khaqan Abbasi
C		Muhammad Azam Khan (1933–2023)	5 June 2018	13 August 2018	69 days	IND	Mulk caretaker government (Caretaker)	Nasirul Mulk
2		Ali Mohammad Mahar (1970–2019); MNA for 205 Ghotki-II	4 October 2018	21 May 2019^{[†]}	229 days	PTI	Imran Khan government	Imran Khan
3		Shehryar Afridi (born 1971); MNA for 32 Kohat (State Minister)	11 June 2019	6 April 2020	300 days	PTI	Imran Khan government	Imran Khan
4		Azam Swati (born 1956); Senator for Khyber Pakhtunkhwa	7 April 2020	11 December 2020	248 days	PTI	Imran Khan government	Imran Khan
5		Brigadier (Retd); Ijaz Ahmed Shah; MNA for 118 Nankana Sahib-II	11 December 2020	10 April 2022	1 year, 120 days	PTI	Imran Khan government	Imran Khan
6		Nawab; Shahzain Bugti (born 1970); MNA for 259 Ziarat-cum-Harnai-cum-Sibbi-cum-Kohlu-cum-Dera Bugti	19 April 2022	9 August 2023	1 year, 112 days	Jamhoori Wattan Party	First Shehbaz Sharif ministry	Shehbaz Sharif
C		Sarfraz Bugti	17 August 2023	15 December 2023	120 days	PPP	Kakar caretaker ministry (Caretaker)	Anwaar ul Haq Kakar
Position vacant during this interval
7		Mohsin Naqvi (born 1978)	11 March 2024	11 February 2025	2 years, 187 days	IND	Second Shehbaz Sharif ministry	Shehbaz Sharif
