= Ali Nawaz Khan Mahar =

Pakistani politician

Member of the Provincial Assembly of Sindh
- In office 13 August 2018 – 11 August 2023
- Constituency: PS-21 Ghotki-IV
- In office 29 May 2013 – 28 May 2018
- Constituency: PS-6 Ghotki-II

Member of the National Assembly of Pakistan
- In office February 2003 – 3 November 2007
- Constituency: NA-201 Ghotki-II

Personal details
- Born: 11 August 1972 (age 54) Khangarh, Sindh, Pakistan
- Party: PPP (2013–present)
- Other political affiliations: PML(Q) (2003–2013)
- Relatives: Ali Gohar Khan Mahar (brother); Ali Mohammad Mahar (brother)

Ali Nawaz Khan Mahar (Sindhi:علي نواز خان مھر) is a Pakistani politician who was a Member of the Provincial Assembly of Sindh, from August 2018 till August 2023 and from May 2013 to May 2018. He was member of the National Assembly of Pakistan from 2003 to 2007 and served as Minister of State for Industries, Production and Special Initiatives in the federal cabinet of Prime Minister Shaukat Aziz from 2004 to 2007.

== Early life and education ==
He was born in a Mahar family on 11 August 1972 in Khangarh, Sindh, Ghotki District.

He has a degree in Masters of Arts from Shah Abdul Latif University.

== Political career ==
He was elected to the National Assembly of Pakistan as a candidate of Pakistan Muslim League (Q) (PML-Q) from Constituency NA 201 (Ghotki-II) in by-polls held in January 2003. He received 176,188 votes and defeated Abdul Latif Shah, a candidate of Pakistan Peoples Party (PPP). In September 2004, he was inducted into the federal cabinet of Prime Minister Shaukat Aziz and was appointed as Minister of State for Industries, Production and Special Initiatives.

He ran for the seat of the Provincial Assembly of Sindh as a candidate of PML-Q from PS-6 (Ghotki-II) in the 2008 Sindh provincial election but was unsuccessful. He received 24,876 votes and lost the seat to Ikramullah Khan Dharejo.

He was elected to the Provincial Assembly of Sindh as a candidate of PPP from PS-6 (Ghotki-II) in the 2013 Pakistani general election. He received 53,989 votes and defeated Moulana Abdul Qayoom Halijivi, a candidate of Jamiat Ulema-e Islam (F) (JUI-F).

He was re-elected to Provincial Assembly of Sindh as a candidate of PPP from PS-21 Ghotki-IV in the 2018 Sindh provincial election.

== Family ==
He is the brother of Ali Gohar Khan Mahar and Ali Mohammad Mahar.
