= New Sukkur Taluka =

New Sukkur
- Tehsil
- Country: Pakistan
- Province: Sindh
- District: Sukkur District

Area
  - Tehsil: 109 km^{2} (42 sq mi)

Population (2023)
  - Tehsil: 356,473
  - Density: 3,270/km^{2} (8,470/sq mi)
  - Urban: ...
  - Rural: ...

Literacy (2023)
  - Literacy rate: 58%
- Time zone: UTC+5 (PST)
- Number of Union Councils: 09

New Sukkur Tehsil is an administrative subdivision (tehsil) of Sukkur District in the Sindh province of Pakistan. The city of Sukkur is the capital.
