= PS-21 Ghotki-IV =

Constituency of the Provincial Assembly of Sindh, Pakistan

- Constituency for the Provincial Assembly of Sindh
- Region: Ghotki Tehsil (partly) including Ghotki city of Ghotki District
- Electorate: 228,353

Current constituency
- Member: Vacant
- Created from: PS-6 Ghotki-II

PS-21 Ghotki-IV (پی ایس-21، گھوٹکی-4) is a constituency of the Provincial Assembly of Sindh.

== General elections 2024 ==
Provincial election 2024: PS-21 Ghotki-IV
Party	Candidate	Votes	%	±%
PPP	Ali Nawaz Khan Mahar	63,758	63.39	
GDA	Ghulam Ali Abbas	29,273	29.10	
PTI	Ghulam Raza (Note: Filed nomination papers as PTI candidate but ECP allowed him to run as an Independent)	3,535	3.51	
Others	Others (seven candidates)	4,021	4.00	
Turnout		105,793	46.32	
Total valid votes		100,587	95.08	
Rejected ballots		5,206	4.92	
Majority		34,485	34.29	
Registered electors		228,353		

== General elections 2018 ==
Contesting candidates	Party affiliation	Votes polled

== General elections 2013 ==
Contesting candidates	Party affiliation	Votes polled

== General elections 2008 ==
Contesting candidates	Party affiliation	Votes polled

== See also ==
- PS-20 Ghotki-III
- PS-22 Sukkur-I
