= PS-20 Ghotki-III =

Constituency of the Provincial Assembly of Sindh, Pakistan

- Constituency for the Provincial Assembly of Sindh
- Region: Khangarh Tehsil, Ghotki Tehsil (partly) and Mirpur Mathelo Tehsil (partly) of Ghotki District
- Electorate: 227,023

Current constituency
- Member: Vacant
- Created from: PS-8 Ghotki-IV

PS-20 Ghotki-III (پی ایس-20، گھوٹکی-3) is a constituency of the Provincial Assembly of Sindh.

== General elections 2024 ==
Provincial election 2024: PS-20 Ghotki-III
| Party | Candidate | Votes | % | ±% |
|---|---|---|---|---|
| PPP | Sardar Muhammad Bakhsh Khan Mahar | 87,743 | 83.99 | |
| JUI (F) | Muhammad Ishaque Laghari | 9,403 | 9.00 | |
| TLP | Sanwal Khan | 3,959 | 3.79 | |
| Others | Others (three candidates) | 3,363 | 3.22 | |
| Turnout | | 108,149 | 47.64 | |
| Total valid votes | | 104,468 | 96.60 | |
| Rejected ballots | | 3,681 | 3.40 | |
| Majority | | 78,340 | 74.99 | |
| Registered electors | | 227,023 | | |

== General elections 2018 ==
| Contesting candidates | Party affiliation | Votes polled |

== General elections 2013 ==
| Contesting candidates | Party affiliation | Votes polled |

== General elections 2008 ==
| Contesting candidates | Party affiliation | Votes polled |

== See also ==
- PS-19 Ghotki-II
- PS-21 Ghotki-IV
