= PS-23 Sukkur-II =

Constituency of the Provincial Assembly of Sindh, Pakistan

- Constituency for the Provincial Assembly of Sindh
- Region: Saleh Pat Tehsil and Rohri Tehsil (partly) of Sukkur District
- Electorate: 190,633

Current constituency
- Member: Vacant
- Created from: PS-4 Sukkur-IV

PS-23 Sukkur-II (پی ایس-23، سکھر-2) is a constituency of the Provincial Assembly of Sindh.

== General elections 2024 ==
Provincial election 2024: PS-23 Sukkur-II
Party	Candidate	Votes	%	±%
PPP	Awais Qadir Shah	69,268	72.14	
GDA	Inayatullah	21,137	22.01	
PMA	Sardar Ghulam Raza Bhanbhro	1,340	1.40	
Independent	Arslan Ahmed Khokhar	1,242	1.29	
Others	Others (fourteen candidates)	3,033	3.16	
Turnout		99,420	52.15	
Total valid votes		96,020	96.58	
Rejected ballots		3,400	3.42	
Majority		48,131	50.13	
Registered electors		190,633		

== General elections 2018 ==
Contesting candidates	Party affiliation	Votes polled

== General elections 2013 ==
Contesting candidates	Party affiliation	Votes polled

== General elections 2008 ==
Contesting candidates	Party affiliation	Votes polled

== See also ==
- PS-22 Sukkur-I
- PS-24 Sukkur-III
