= Muhammad Bux Khan Mahar =

Pakistani politician

- سردار محمد بخش خان مهر

Member of the National Assembly of Pakistan
- In office 1 August 2019 – 12 August 2023

Member of the Provincial Assembly of Sindh
- In office 29 May 2013 – 28 May 2018

Personal details
- Born: 17 December 1987 (age 38) Mirpur Mathelo, Sindh, Pakistan
- Party: PPP (2013-present)
- Relations: Sardar Ghulam Muhammad Khan Mahar (Father)

Sardar Muhammad Bux Khan Mahar (Sindhi: سردار محمد بخش خان مهر) is a Pakistani politician who is currently serving as the Provincial Minister of Agriculture for Sindh Province. Concurrently, Muhammad Bux is also holding portfolios of three other prominent cabinet ministeries of Sindh, namely; Ministry of Supply and Prices, Ministry of Sports and Youth Affairs, and Ministry of Enquiries and Anti-Corruption Establishment since 2024.

He had been a Member of the Provincial Assembly of Sindh, from May 2013 to May 2018. He was Adviser to CM Sindh 2018 to 2019.

He is elected as member of National Assembly on 23 July 2019 in a by election defeating PTI & GDA backed independent candidate.

== Early life ==
He was born on 17 December 1987 in Mirpur Mathelo, Ghotki District in a Sindhi family of Mahar (tribe).

== Political career ==
He was elected to the Provincial Assembly of Sindh as a candidate of Pakistan Peoples Party from Constituency PS-8 (Ghotki-IV) in the 2013 Pakistani general election.

In August 2016, he was inducted into the provincial Sindh cabinet of Chief Minister Syed Murad Ali Shah and was appointed as Provincial Minister of Sindh for Sports.

On 19 August 2018, he was inducted into the provincial Sindh cabinet of Chief Minister Syed Murad Ali Shah. On 20 August 2018, he was appointed as adviser to Chief Minister on industries and commerce. On 15 October 2018, he was allocated the additional ministerial portfolio of sports and youth affairs.

He took oath as Member of National Assembly of Pakistan on 1 August 2019.

== Personal life ==
Sardar Muhammad Bux Khan Mahar is a chieftain of Mahar tribe which is inhabiting parts of Upper Sindh, particularly concentrated in Ghotki. He is the son of Ghulam Muhammad Mahar, a prominent politician and tribal chieftain of Mahar tribe. Sardar Muhammad Bux Mahar and his family owns thousands of acres agricultural lands in Ghotki and Sukkur that was conferred upon Muhammad's Bux ancestors by the British Raj for their services to British government.

Muhammad Bux was earlier married with Saman Sardar, the daughter of MNA Safdar Abbasi and Naheed Abbasi. The couple is blessed with two kids, one daughter and a son. Later, Sardar Muhammad Bux Mahar divorced Saman and married for the second time with a Paris-based visual artist, culinary professional and a painter Zara Khan, in June 2024. Muhamamd Bux's brother, Bangul Khan Mahar serves as the Chairman District Council Ghotki and has earlier served as the Special Assistant to the Chief Minister of Sindh for Sports and Wildlife Department.
