= Saifullah Khan Dharejo =

Pakistani politician

Jam Saifullah Khan Dharejo
- ڄام سيف الله خان ڌاريجو

Member of the Senate of Pakistan
- Incumbent
- Assumed office 9 April 2024
- Constituency: General Senate Seat Sindh

Member of the Provincial Assembly of Sindh
- In office 19 November 1988 – 6 May 1990
- Constituency: PS-3 SUKKUR-III
- In office 20 February 1997 – 12 October 1999
- Constituency: PS-4 SUKKUR
- In office 2002–2007
- Constituency: PS-3 SUKKUR-III
- In office 2008–2013

Personal details
- Party: PPP
- Parent: Jam Abdul Sattar Dharejo (father)
- Relatives: Ikramullah Khan Dharejo (brother)

Jam Saifullah Khan Dharejo (Sindhi: ڄام سيف الله خان ڌاريجو) is a Pakistani politician who has been a member of Senate of Pakistan from 2024 and member of Provincial Assembly of Sindh from 10 October 2002 to 15 November 2007.

== Political career ==
He was elected to Provincial Assembly of Sindh in 1988 from Constituency PS-3 Sukkur then again re-elected in 1997 from PS-4 Sukkur then again re elected in 2002 from PS-3 Sukkur then re-elected from the same seat in 2008. Dharejo was elected from Sindh province during the 2024 Pakistani Senate election as a Pakistan People's Party Parliamentarians candidate on a general seat.
