= Nauman Islam Shaikh =

Pakistani politician

- نعمان اسلم شیخ

Member of the National Assembly of Pakistan
- Incumbent
- Assumed office 29 February 2024
- Constituency: NA-200 Sukkur-I
- In office 13 August 2018 – 10 August 2023
- Constituency: NA-207 (Sukkur-II)
- In office 2008 – 31 May 2018
- Constituency: NA-198 (Sukkur-cum-Shikarpur-I)

Personal details
- Born: July 24, 1978 (age 47)
- Party: PPP (2008-present)

Nauman Islam Shaikh (Sindhi: نعمان اسلام شيخ;Urdu: نعمان اسلام شیخ; born 24 July 1978) is a Pakistani politician who has been a member of the National Assembly of Pakistan since February 2024 and previously served in this position from August 2018 till August 2023 and from 2008 to May 2018, he gets the chance due to his father Mr. Islamudin Shaikh (Senior Politician, Socialist & Businessman) he is the only Politician to give tough time to Syed Khursheed Shah senior member of Pakistan Peoples Party, he is step down for not having graduation degree as per 2008 mandatory at that time to participate in general election.

== Early life ==
He was born on Sukkur 24 July 1978.

== Political career ==
He was elected to the National Assembly of Pakistan as a candidate of Pakistan Peoples Party (PPP) from Constituency NA-198 (Sukkur-cum-Shikarpur-I) in the 2008 Pakistani general election. He received 74,086 votes and defeated Tahir Hussain Shah, a candidate of Pakistan Muslim League (Q) (PML-Q).

He was re-elected to the National Assembly as a candidate of PPP from Constituency NA-198 (Sukkur-cum-Shikarpur-I) in the 2013 Pakistani general election. He received 52,684 votes and defeated Munawar Ali Chohan, a candidate of Muttahida Qaumi Movement.

He was re-elected to the National Assembly as a candidate of PPP from Constituency NA-207 (Sukkur-II) in the 2018 Pakistani general election.

He was re-elected to the National Assembly as a candidate of PPP from NA-200 Sukkur-I in the 2024 Pakistani general election. He received 98,244 votes and defeated Deedar Ali, a candidate of the Grand Democratic Alliance (GDA).
