= Dadloi =

Coordinates: 27°55′N 69°10′E

Dadloi is a village situated around 12 km away from Pano Aqil in Sukkur District, Sindh, Pakistan, well known for its past history of feudal lords of Dharejo community and their long political affiliation. The village is located along the National Highway thereby adding to its importance. 80% of the population inhabited there are Dharejo. Some of the other communities residing in this village are Syed, Abbasi, Mirbahar, Solangi, Daudpoto, Soomro, Shaikh etc.

As of the 2017 census, the population of Dadloi is 17,470, in 3,218 households.
