= Salahuddin Tirmizi =

Pakistani politician

Syed Salahuddin Tirmizi HI(M) SBt TBt

Minister for Narcotics Control
- In office 4 August 2017 – 31 May 2018
- President: Mamnoon Hussain
- Prime Minister: Shahid Khaqan Abbasi
- Preceded by: Office established
- Succeeded by: Muhammad Azam Khan

Personal details
- Born: May 1, 1943 (age 83) Mansehra
- Party: Pakistan Muslim League (N)
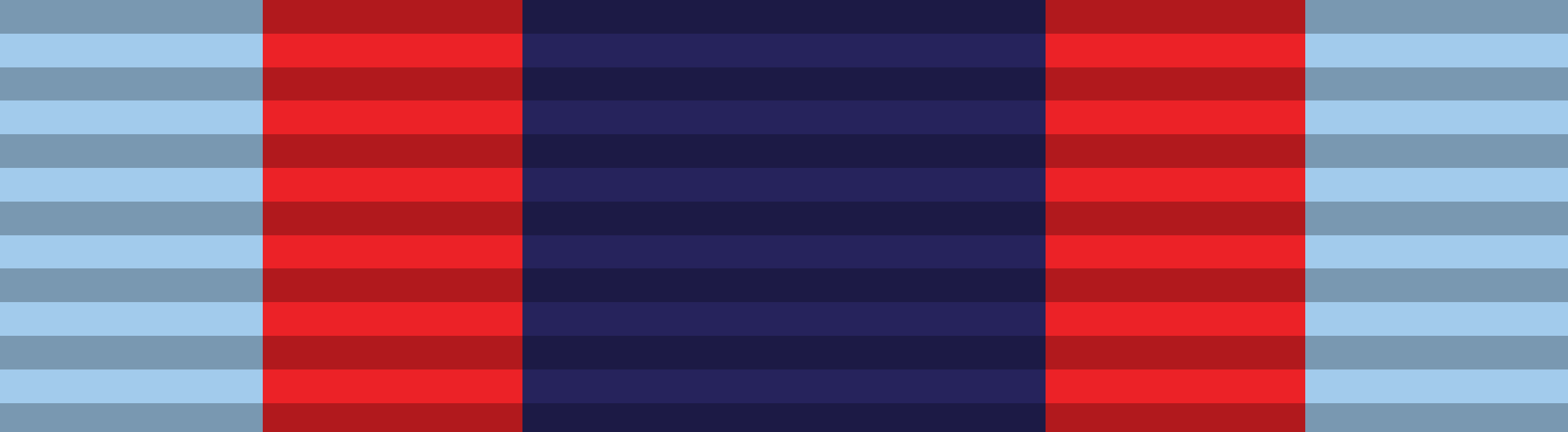
- Awards: Hilal-e-Imtiaz (Military) Sitara-e-Basalat Tamgha-e-Basalat

Syed Salahuddin Tirmizi HI(M) SBt TBt (Urdu: صلاح الدین ترمذی; born 1 May 1943) is a retired Pakistan Army general and politician who served as Minister for Narcotics Control, in Abbasi cabinet from August 2017 to May 2018. He had been a member of the Senate of Pakistan, representing Pakistan Muslim League (N) from March 2015 to March 2021.

== Early life and education ==
He was born on 1 May 1943 in Mansehra. He studied at Cadet College Hasan Abdal before attending Pakistan Military Academy Kakul from where he received B.A degree. He received his B.Sc. Honours degree from Balochistan University in Quetta and completed his M.Sc. in War Studies from Quaid-e-Azam University in 1984.

He belongs to the noble Syed family of Kaghan and is also referred to as the 'Chief of Kaghan' after his father. His father was Syed Mehmood Shah, Member of the Legislative Assembly and Chief of Kaghan.

== Military career ==
He was commissioned in Pakistan Army, Armoured Corps in October 1964. His major assignments in Pakistan Army were Instructor at the National Defence College, Islamabad (now National Defence University), Commander 3rd Independent Armoured Brigade Group, Chief of Staff IV Corps, General Officer Commanding First Armoured Division, Director General Armoured Corps, GHQ.

Director General Anti Narcotics Task Force (ANTF), Chairman Pakistan Narcotics Board (PNCB) and later, on merger of the two departments, the first Director General of Anti Narcotics Force (ANF), he also held additional appointment of Secretary Narcotics Control Division during the period of merger of ANTF and PNCB, raising the force as well as framing its laws.

He was also Corps Commander II Corps, also known as II Strike Corps and Commandant National Defence College, Islamabad (now National Defence University) from 25 October 1998 - 2 March 2000.

He has visited various countries of Asia, Europe, North America, South America and Australia as Leader / Member of Pakistani Delegation on Study Tours, Conferences and Courses.

== Political career ==
He ran for the seat of the National Assembly of Pakistan from constituency NA-20 Manshera-I in the 2002 Pakistani general election. He was declared unsuccessful amid an election that has been widely considered to be rigged by General Musharraf's regime, with concerns about their legitimacy raised by international watchdogs.

He joined Pakistan Muslim League (N) in 2006 and ran for the seat of the National Assembly of Pakistan from constituency NA-20 Manshera-I as a candidate of Pakistan Muslim League (N) in the 2008 Pakistani general election. He was declared successful, however, a re-poll was allowed by the courts in the losing candidate's home constituency, enabling the result to be overturned in the losing candidate's favour. "The winning candidate from NA-20, Mansehra, Lt-Gen (retired) Salahuddin Tirmizi of PML-N challenged the order of the Chief Election Commission (CEC) in the Peshawar High Court's Abbottabad bench regarding re-polling at two polling stations of the constituency on March 13." These elections were also held under General Musharraf's regime.

He was elected to the Senate of Pakistan as a candidate of Pakistan Muslim League (N) in the 2015 Pakistani Senate election.

Following the election of Shahid Khaqan Abbasi as Prime Minister of Pakistan in August 2017, he was inducted into the federal cabinet. He was appointed as the Federal Minister of Narcotics Control. He served at the post till the dissolution of the National Assembly on the expiration of its term on 31 May 2018.

== Awards and decorations ==

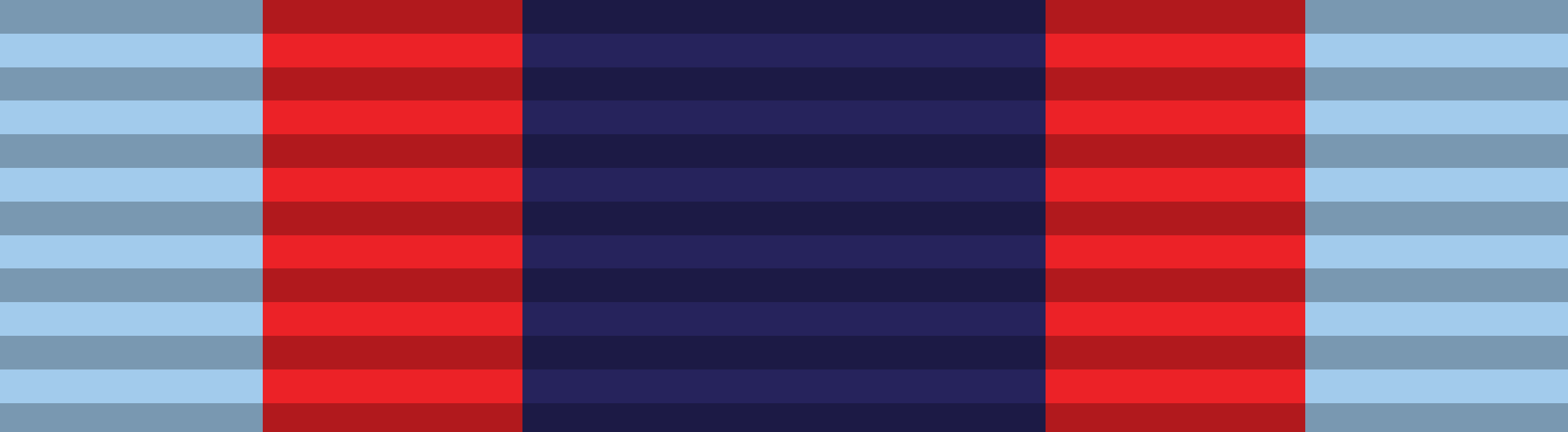

Hilal-e-Imtiaz (Military) (Crescent of Excellence)	Sitara-e-Basalat (Star of Good Conduct)	Tamgha-e-Basalat (Medal of Good Conduct)	Sitara-e-Harb 1965 War (War Star 1965)
Sitara-e-Harb 1971 War (War Star 1971)	Tamgha-e-Jang 1965 War (War Medal 1965) With Imtiazi Sanad	Tamgha-e-Jang 1971 War (War Medal 1971)	Tamgha-e-Baqa (Nuclear Test Medal) 1998
10 Years Service Medal	20 Years Service Medal	30 Years Service Medal	35 Years Service Medal
10 Years Service Medal	20 Years Service Medal	30 Years Service Medal	Tamgha-e-Sad Saala Jashan-e- Wiladat-e-Quaid-e-Azam (100th Birth Anniversary of Muhammad Ali Jinnah) 1976
Hijri Tamgha (Hijri Medal) 1979	Jamhuriat Tamgha (Democracy Medal) 1988	Qarardad-e-Pakistan Tamgha (Resolution Day Golden Jubilee Medal) 1990	Tamgha-e-Salgirah Pakistan (Independence Day Golden Jubilee Medal) 1997
