= PS-25 Sukkur-IV =

Constituency of the Provincial Assembly of Sindh, Pakistan

- Constituency for the Provincial Assembly of Sindh
- Region: New Sukkur Tehsil, Sukkur city Tehsil (partly),Rohri Tehsil (partly) including Rohri city and Pano Aqil Tehsil (partly) of Sukkur District
- Electorate: 234,377

Current constituency
- Member: Vacant
- Created from: PS-2 Sukkur-II

PS-25 Sukkur-IV (پی ایس-25، سکھر-4) is a constituency of the Provincial Assembly of Sindh.

== General elections 2024 ==
Provincial election 2024: PS-25 Sukkur-IV
Party	Candidate	Votes	%	±%
PPP	Nasir Hussain Shah	51,798	53.20	
JUI (F)	Ameer Bux Alias Meer	25,046	25.73	
PTI	Abdul Aziz (Note: Filed nomination papers as PTI candidate but ECP allowed him to run as an Independent)	7,073	7.27	
JI	Muhammad Zubair Hafeez	3,276	3.37	
Independent	Syed Kumail Hyder Shah	2,047	2.10	
TLP	Ghulam Hassan Chachar	1,898	1.95	
Independent	Pervaiz Ali	1,728	1.78	
Others	Others (sixteen candidates)	4,496	4.60	
Turnout		101,765	41.69	
Total valid votes		97,362	95.67	
Rejected ballots		4,403	4.33	
Majority		26,752	27.47	
Registered electors		244,095		

== General elections 2018 ==
Contesting candidates	Party affiliation	Votes polled

== General elections 2013 ==
Contesting candidates	Party affiliation	Votes polled

== General elections 2008 ==
Contesting candidates	Party affiliation	Votes polled

== See also ==
- PS-24 Sukkur-III
- PS-26 Khairpur-I
