= Ali Mohammad Mahar =

Pakistani politician (1970–2019)

- علی محمد مہر

Federal Minister for Narcotics Control
- In office 4 October 2018 – 21 May 2019
- Prime Minister: Imran Khan
- Preceded by: Mohammad Azam Khan (caretaker)
- Succeeded by: Shehryar Afridi

Chief Minister of Sindh
- In office 17 December 2002 – 9 June 2004
- Prime Minister: Zafarullah Khan Jamali

Member of the National Assembly of Pakistan
- In office 13 August 2018 – 21 May 2019
- Constituency: NA-205 (Ghotki-II)
- In office 2008 – 31 May 2018
- Constituency: NA-201 (Ghotki-II)

Personal details
- Born: 12 January 1970
- Died: 21 May 2019 (aged 49)
- Party: PTI (2008-2019)
- Relatives: Ali Gohar Khan Mahar (brother); Ali Nawaz Khan Mehar (brother)

Sardar Ali Mohammad Khan Mahar (Sindhi: سردار علي محمد خان مھر; Urdu, سردارعلی محمد خان مہر; 12 January 1970 – 21 May 2019) was a Pakistani politician who served as the 25th Chief Minister of Sindh from 2002 to 2004 and then as the Federal Minister for Narcotics Control between 2018 and 2019.

He remained a member of the National Assembly between 2008 and May 2019 and a member of the Provincial Assembly of Sindh from 2002 to 2007.

== Early life and education ==
Mahar was born on 12 January 1970 to Ali Anwar Khan Mahar. He had degree of Bachelor of Arts.

== Political career ==
He was elected to the National Assembly of Pakistan as an independent candidate from Constituency NA-201 (Ghotki-II) in the 2002 Pakistani general election. He received 77,950 votes and defeated Gulam Rasool Kalhoro, a candidate of Muttahida Majlis-e-Amal (MMA). In the same election, he was elected to the Provincial Assembly of Sindh as an independent candidate from Constituency PS-6 (Ghotki-II). He received 23,667 votes and defeated Ahsanullah Khan Sundrani, a candidate of National Alliance.

On 17 December 2002, he became 25th Chief Minister of Sindh where he served until resignation on 9 June 2004.

He was re-elected to the National Assembly as an independent candidate from Constituency NA-201 (Ghotki-II) in the 2008 Pakistani general election. He received 74,714 votes and defeated Sardar Ahmed Ali Khan Pitafi. In the same election, he also ran for the seat of the National Assembly as an independent candidate from Constituency NA-200 (Ghotki-I) but was unsuccessful. He received 32,532 votes and lost the seat to Abdul Haq.

He was re-elected to the National Assembly as a candidate of PPP from Constituency NA-201 (Ghotki-II) in the 2013 Pakistani general election. He received 124,472 votes and defeated Niaz Muhammad, a candidate of Muttahida Qaumi Movement (MQM).

He was re-elected to the National Assembly as an independent candidate from Constituency NA-205 (Ghotki-II) in the 2018 Pakistani general election. Following his successful election, he announced to join Pakistan Tehreek-e-Insaf (PTI).

On 11 September 2018, he was inducted into the federal cabinet of Prime Minister Imran Khan. On 4 October 2018, he was appointed Federal Minister for Narcotics Control.

He died on 21 May 2019 due to a heart attack.

Political offices
Preceded by Liaquat Ali Jatoi	Chief Minister of Sindh; 2002–2004	Succeeded by Arbab Ghulam Rahim
