= Awais Qadir Shah =

Pakistani politician

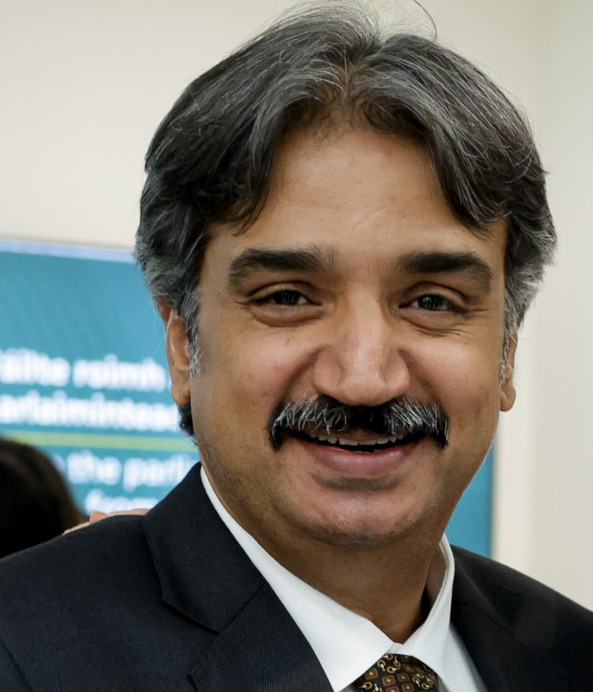

Speaker of the Provincial Assembly of Sindh
- Incumbent
- Assumed office 25 February 2024
- Preceded by: Agha Siraj Durrani

Member of the Provincial Assembly of Sindh
- Incumbent
- Assumed office 25 February 2024
- Constituency: PS-23 Sukkur-II
- In office 13 August 2018 – 11 August 2023
- Constituency: PS-23 Sukkur-II
- In office 29 May 2013 – 28 May 2018

Personal details
- Born: 12 October 1977 (age 48) Sukkur, Sindh, Pakistan
- Party: PPP (2013-present)

Awais Qadir Shah (Sindhi: سيد اويس قادر شاھ; born 12 October 1977) is a Pakistani politician who is currently serving as the Speaker of the Provincial Assembly of Sindh, in office since February 2024. He is son in law of Syed Khursheed Ahmed Shah senior leader of PPPP. He previously had been a Member of the Provincial Assembly of Sindh, from August 2018 to August 2023 and from May 2013 to May 2018.

== Early life and education ==
He was born on 12 October 1977 in Sukkur.

He has a degree in Bachelor of Engineering from Civil Mehran University in Jamshoro.

== Political career ==
He was elected to the Provincial Assembly of Sindh as a candidate of Pakistan Peoples Party (PPP) from Constituency PS-4 SUKKUR-III (OLD SUKKUR-IV) in the 2013 Pakistani general election.

He was re-elected to Provincial Assembly of Sindh as a candidate of PPP from Constituency PS-23 (Sukkur-II) in the 2018 Pakistani general election.

On 15 October 2018, he was inducted into the provincial Sindh cabinet of Chief Minister Syed Murad Ali Shah and was appointed Provincial Minister of Sindh for transport and mass transit.
