= Sukkur Tehsil =

Sukkur
- Tehsil
- Country: Pakistan
- Province: Sindh
- District: Sukkur District
- Time zone: UTC+5 (PST)
- Number of Union Councils: 11

Sukkur City Tehsil is an administrative subdivision (tehsil) of Sukkur District in the Sindh province of Pakistan, the city of Sukkur is the capital.

== Administration ==
Sukkur City Taluka is administratively subdivided into 11 Union Councils. New Sukkur Taluka administratively subdivided into 9 Union Councils.
