= Ikramullah Khan Dharejo =

Pakistani politician

Jam Ikramullah Khan Dharejo
- ڄام الله خان ڌاريجو

Member of the Provincial Assembly of Sindh
- Incumbent
- Assumed office 16 March 2008
- Constituency: PS-22

Personal details
- Born: 17 April 1973 (age 53) Sukkur, Sindh, Pakistan
- Party: PPP (2008-present)
- Relations: Jam Saifullah Khan Dharejo (brother)

Jam Ikramullah Khan Dharejo (Sindhi: ڄام الله خان ڌاريجو) is a Pakistani politician who had been a Member of the Provincial Assembly of Sindh from February 2008 till August 2023, and again from 2024.

== Early life and family ==
He was born on 17 April 1973 in Adilpur, Ghotki district.

He is the brother of former Provincial Minister of Sindh Irrigation, Jam Saifullah Khan Dharejo.

== Political career ==
He was elected to the Provincial Assembly of Sindh as a candidate of Pakistan Peoples Party (PPP) from Constituency PS-6 (Sukkur-II) in the 2008 Pakistani general election. He received 29,633 votes and defeated Ali Nawaz Khan Mehar.

He was re-elected to the Provincial Assembly of Sindh as a candidate of PPP from Constituency PS-3 (Sukkur-II) in the 2013 Pakistani general election. He received 26,348 votes and defeated Ali Gohar Indhar, a candidate of Jamiat Ulema-e Islam (F) (JUI-F).

In August 2016, he was into provincial Sindh cabinet of Chief Minister Syed Murad Ali Shah and was appointed as Provincial Minister of Sindh for co-operatives.

He was re-elected to Provincial Assembly of Sindh as a candidate of PPP from Constituency PS-22 (Sukkur-I) in the 2018 Pakistan General Electionsagainst Ali Gohar Khan Mahar a candidate for Grand Democratic Alliance (GDA).

In August 2019 he was re-inducted to the Sindh cabinet of Chief Minister Syed Murad Ali Shah as minister of Co-operatives and an additional portfolio of Industries and Commerce.

In a cabinet shuffle in February 2020, he was given the additional portfolio of Inquiries and Anti-corruption establishment. He was also appointed as PPP Deputy General Secretary Sindh by party leadership.
