= Feroze Wattwan =

فیروزوٹواں
- Town
- Feroze Wattowan
- Country: Pakistan
- Province: Punjab
- District: Sheikhupura

Government
  - Malik Abbas Wattoo Chairman: Gh Mustafa Wattoo (Marhoom)
- Time zone: UTC+5 (PST)
- Number of Union councils: 2

Feroze Wattwan فیروز وٹواں is a town in Sheikhupura District, Punjab, Pakistan.
