= Ghotki Tehsil =

Ghotki
- Tehsil
- Country: Pakistan
- Province: Sindh
- District: Ghotki District
- Time zone: UTC+5 (PST)
- Number of Union Councils: 10

Ghotki Tehsil is an administrative subdivision (tehsil) of Ghotki District in the Sindh province of Pakistan. It is administratively subdivided into ten Union Councils, two of which form the capital Ghotki.

== See also ==
- 2019 Ghotki riots
