= Rohri Tehsil =

Rohri Taluka تعلقہ روہڑی روهڙي تعلقو
- Tehsil
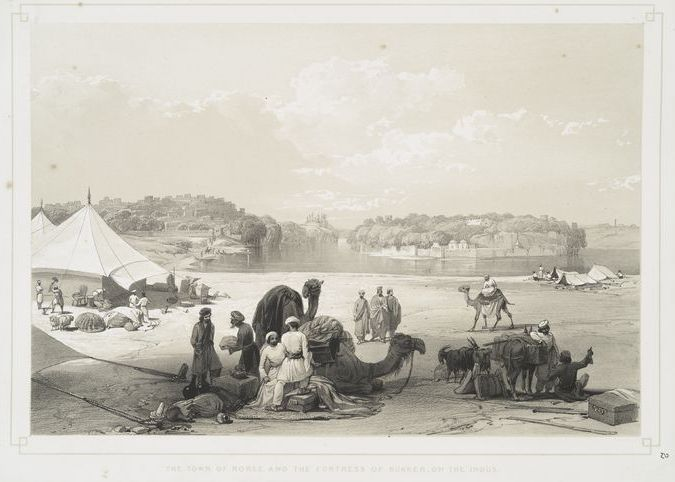
- A historic image of Rohri - Sukkur
- Interactive map of Rohri Taluka
- Coordinates: 28°8′N 69°29′E
- Country: Pakistan
- Province: Sindh
- District: Sukkur District

Government
  - Type: Tehsil Municipal Administration
  - Assistant Commissioner: Hasan Abid
- Time zone: UTC+5 (PST)
- Number of Union Councils: 11

Rohri Tehsil (Urdu: تحصِيل روہڑی) is an administrative subdivision (tehsil) of Sukkur District in the Sindh province of Pakistan. The town of Rohri is the administrative capital of the tehsil.

== Administration ==
Assistant Commissioner of Taluka Rohri is Awais Mushtaq Khokhar(PAS-42nd CTP). Rohri Taluka is administratively subdivided into 11 Union Councils.
