= Sardar Muhammad Bakhsh Khan Mahar =

Pakistani politician

- سردار غلام محمد خان مهر

Member of the National Assembly of Pakistan
- In office 23 July 2019 – 10 August 2023
- Constituency: NA-205 (Ghotki-II)

Personal details
- Party: PPP (2019–present)

Sardar Muhammad Bakhsh Khan Mahar (Sindhi: سردار غلام محمد خان مهر) is a Pakistani politician who had been member of the National Assembly of Pakistan from July 2019 till August 2023.

== Political career ==
Bakhsh Khan Mahar contested a by-election on 23 July 2019 from constituency NA-205 (Ghotki-II) of National Assembly of Pakistan on the ticket of Pakistan People's Party. He won the election by the majority of 18,511 votes over the independent runner up Ahmed Ali Khan Mahar. He garnered 89,359 votes while Ahmed Khan Mahar received 70,848 votes.
