= Syed Farukh Ahmed Shah =

Pakistani politician

- سيد فرخ احمد شاھ

Member of the Provincial Assembly of Sindh
- In office 13 August 2018 – 11 August 2023
- Constituency: PS-24 (Sukkur-III)

Personal details
- Party: PPP (2018-present)
- Parent: Khurshid Shah (father)

Syed Farukh Ahmed Shah (Sindhi: سيد فرخ احمد شاھ) is a Pakistani politician who had been a member of the Provincial Assembly of Sindh from August 2018 till August 2023.

== Political career ==
He was elected to the Provincial Assembly of Sindh as a candidate of Pakistan Peoples Party from Constituency PS-24 (Sukkur-III) in the 2018 Pakistani general election.
