= Sukkur District =

District in Sindh, Pakistan

Sukkur: سکر ضلعو; ضلع سکھر
- Sukkur District
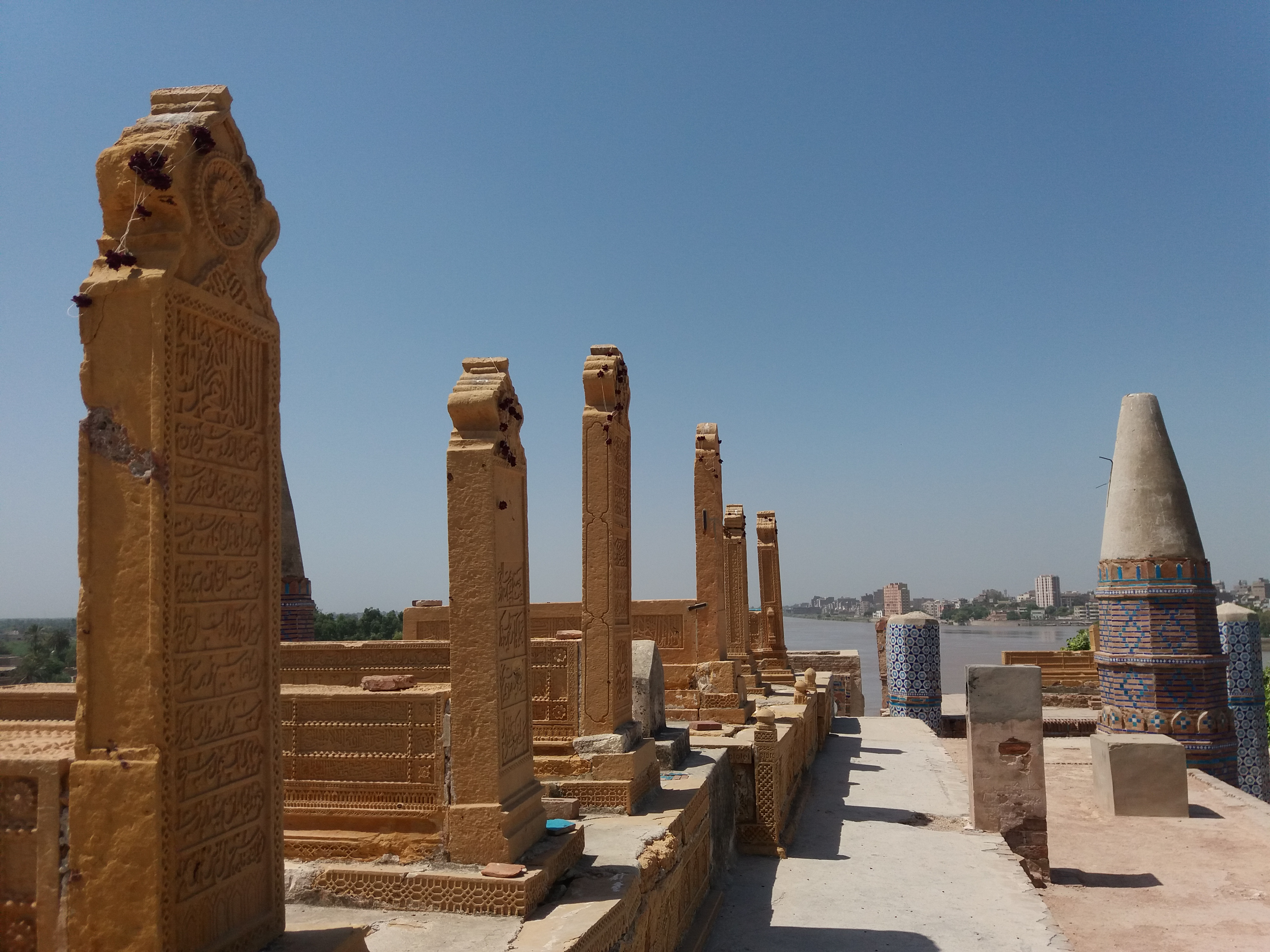
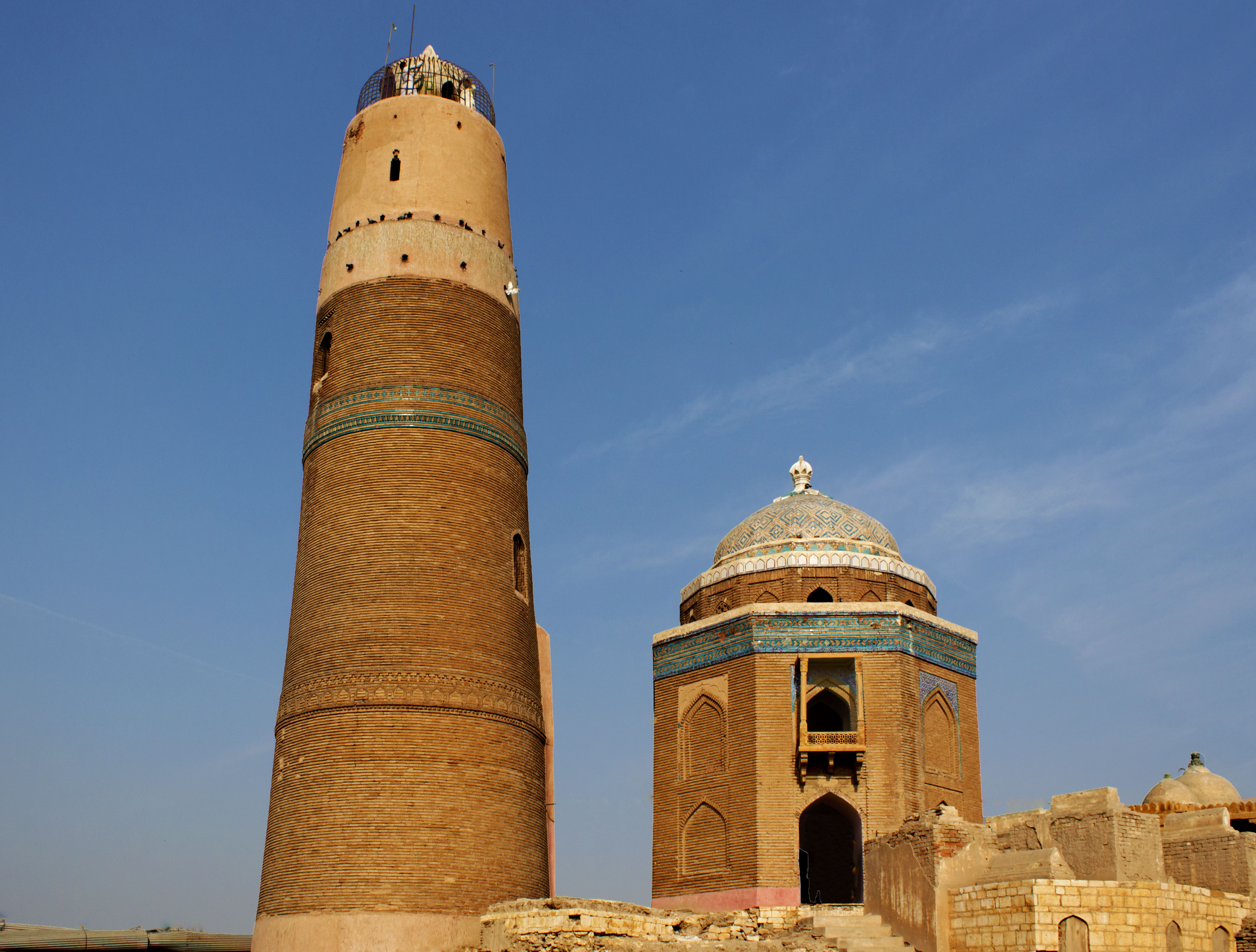
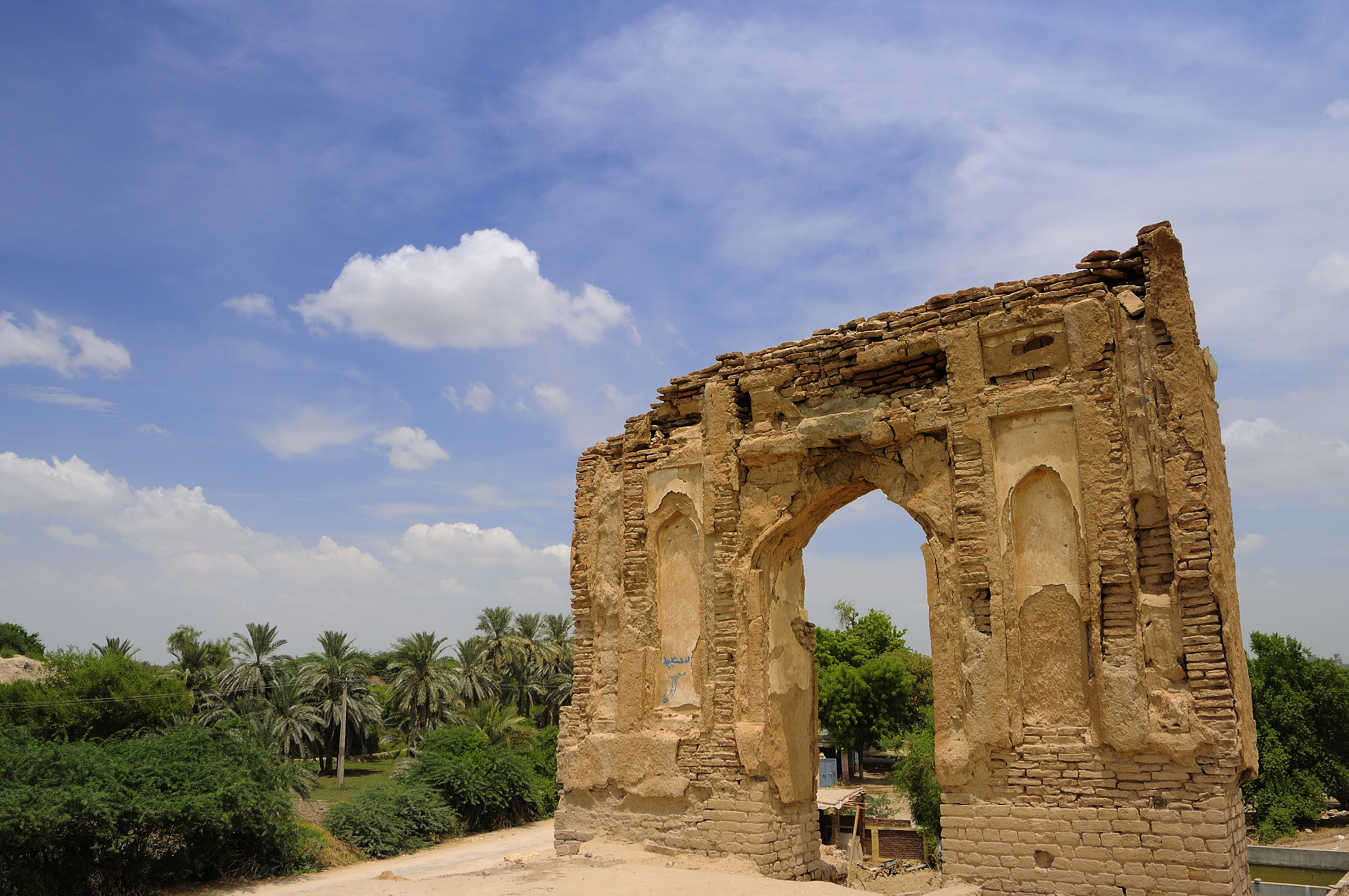
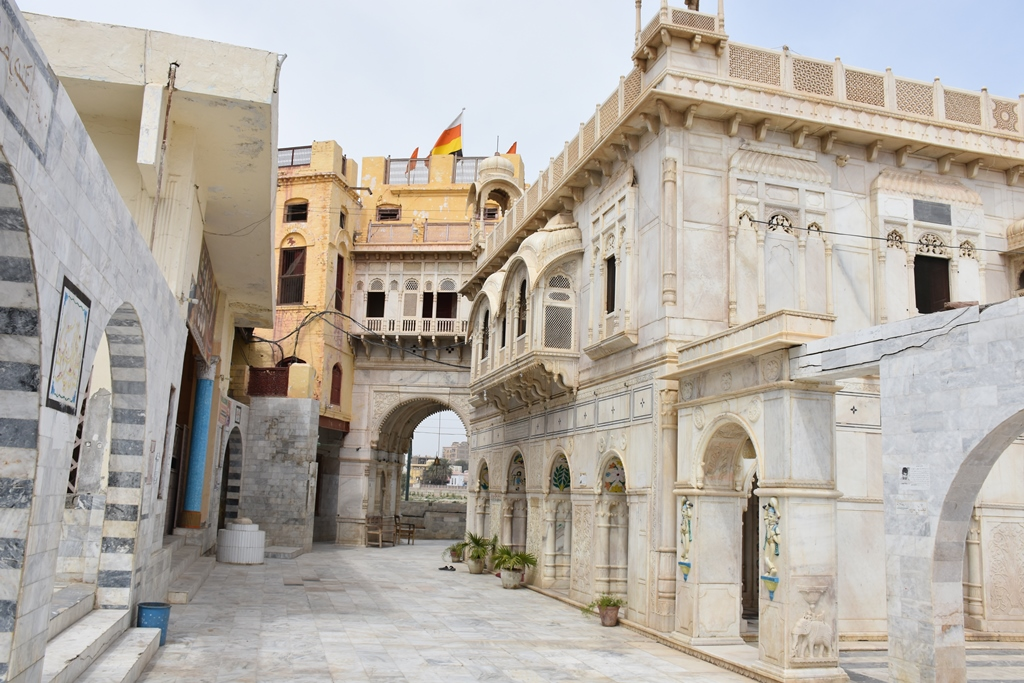
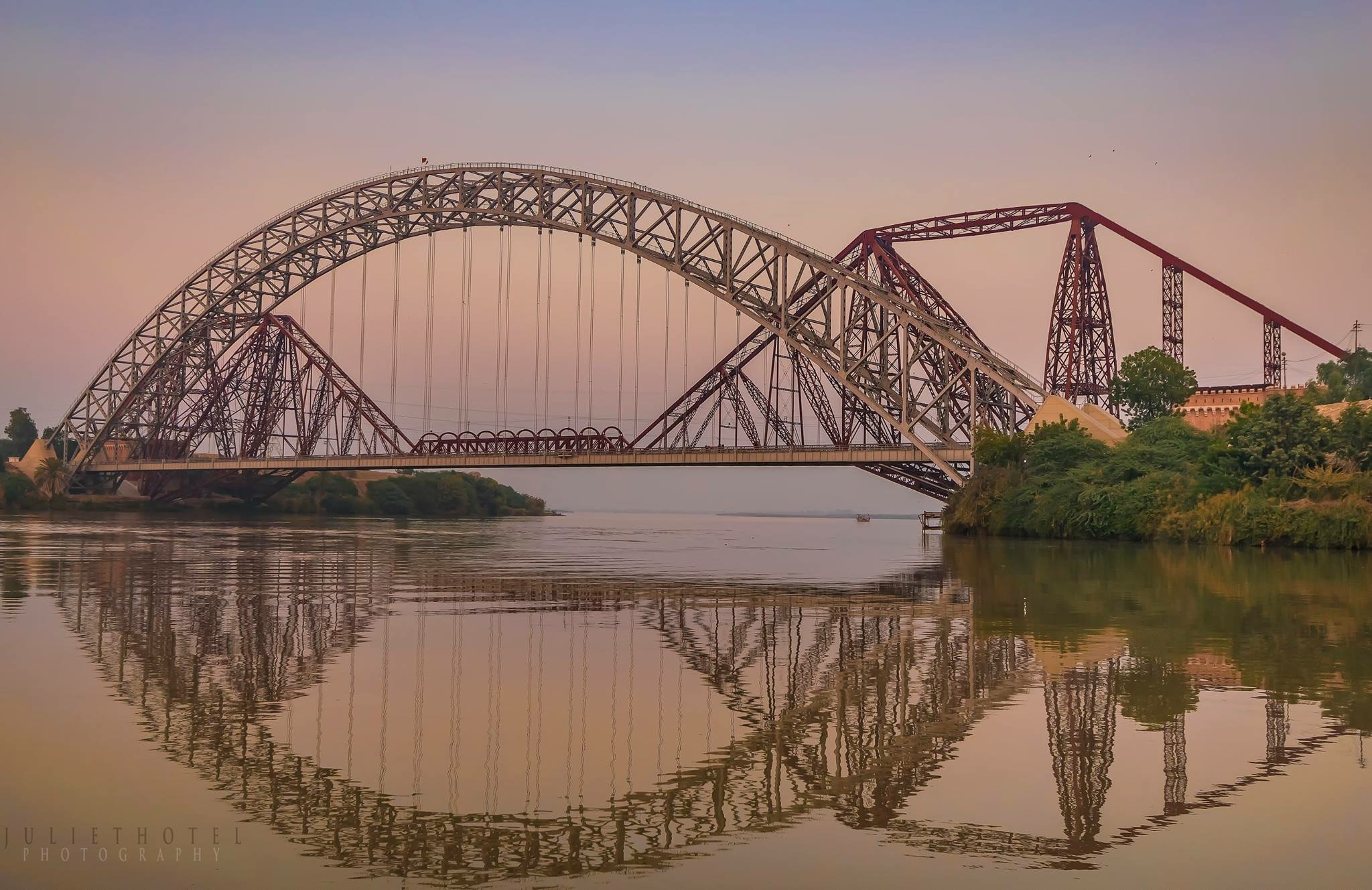
- Clockwise from top-left: Sateen Jo Aastan, Mir Masum's Minar, Sadh Bela temple, Landsdowne Bridge, Muhammad Bin Qasim Masjid

- Map of Sindh with Sukkur District highlighted
- Coordinates: 27°40′N 69°30′E
- Country: Pakistan
- Province: Sindh
- Division: Sukkur
- Established: 1843; 183 years ago
- Headquarters: Shikarpur 1843 to 1883 Sukkur 1883 to continue
- Administrative Subdivisions: 05: New Sukkur Taluka Pano Aqil Taluka Rohri Taluka Salehpat Taluka Sukkur City Taluka

Government
  - Type: District Administration
  - Deputy Commissioner: Dr M.B Raja Dharejo
  - Constituensy: NA-200 Sukkur-I; NA-201 Sukkur-II

Area
  - Sukkur District: 5,165 km^{2} (1,994 sq mi)
- Elevation: 64 m (210 ft)
- Highest elevation: 163 m (535 ft)
- Lowest elevation: 41 m (135 ft)

Population (2023)
  - Sukkur District: 1,625,467
  - Density: 314.7/km^{2} (815.1/sq mi)
  - Urban: 814,999
  - Rural: 824,898

Literacy
  - Literacy rate: Total: 58.26%; Male: 68.10%; Female: 47.20%
- Time zone: UTC+05:00 (PKT)
  - Summer (DST): DST is not observed
- ZIP Code: 65200
- NWD (area) code: 071
- ISO 3166 code: PK-SD

Sukkur District (Sindhi: سکر ضلعو, Urdu: ضلع سکّھر) is a district in Sindh Province in Pakistan. Two districts have been split off from the territory of Sukkur: Shikarpur in 1977 and Ghotki in 1993. According to 2023 Pakistani census population of Sukkur District is 1,625,467 (1.6 million).

== Administrative subdivisions ==
Tehsils, UCs and Villages in District Sukkur
Tehsil	Population (2023)	Area (km²)	Union Councils	Villages
Sukkur City	266,940	150	11	25
New Sukkur	356,163	150	09	25
Rohri	421,500	1319	12	400
Saleh Pat	137,738	2339	03	250
Pano Aqil	443,126	1233	12	450
Total	1,625,467	5191	54	1150

== History ==
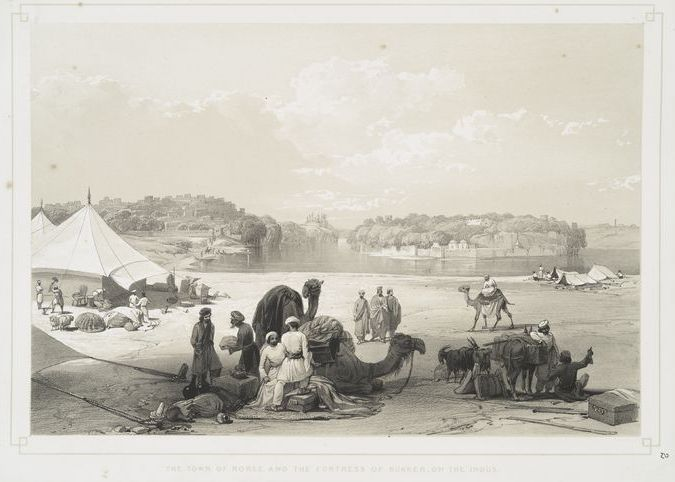
A historic image of Rohri - Sukkur

The East India Company occupied Sindh in 1843. They formed three districts in Sindh administratively: Hyderabad, Karachi and Shikarpur.

In 1883 British Government shifted the district headquarter from Shikarpur to Sukkur and in 1901 again British Government shifted the district status from Shikarpur to Sukkur.

In 1904, the Pano Akil mahal was converted into a taluka of Sukkur District.

At the time of Pakistan's independence in 1947, Sukkur district comprised approximately 200,000 inhabitants, mostly engaged in agricultural pursuits and fishing industry. Over time, Sukkur has seen a moderate rise in population (2 to 2.5% per annum) as compared to Pakistan's, except in late 1960s and early 70s, when population growth rate reached 4.43% (1972 census) due to internal migration and establishment of some large bridges on river Indus.

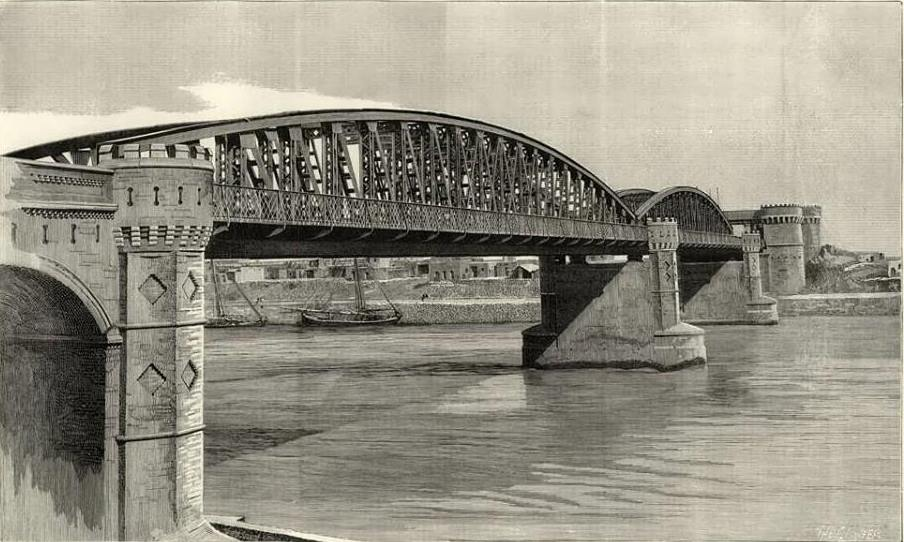
A drawing of Railway Bridge over Indus - Sukkur (Published in The Engineer)

Sukkur district is chiefly populated by Muslims that constitute 96% of the total population. The minorities include: Hindus 3.28% and Christians about 0.51%. Hindus are mostly settled in urban areas and are engaged in the trade and services sectors.

The independence of Pakistan in 1947 saw the influx of Muslims which include Urdu-speaking Muhajirs, Bandhani speaking Rajputs from Rajasthan, who migrated from India and settled here, mostly in the aftermath of riots when Pakistan was carved out of India as the result of Muslim vote; the Muslim population of India voted for their separate homeland, the Pakistan. While some of the Bandhani and Punjabis were settled here before partition.

Traditionally Sindhi Memons and Sindhi hindus were associated with trade and retail business but during last two decades they have ascended as an active social and economic front. Sukkur is noteworthy in Sindh and Pakistan generally for its comparative tolerance towards religious and ethnic minorities.

City is a multi-ethnic and has a mix of Sindhis, Punjabis, Brahuis, Balochis and Pakhtuns. Sindhis are native to the area and speak its various dialects of Sindhi, including, Utradi, Thari, Dhatki, etc. A large number of Punjabis were attracted to the city after the Indus treaty settlement and are settled around the downtown and chowk Ghantaghar in central part of the city.

Most Pakhtons are distinct and separately living near the railway station and its vicinity. The city therefore has cosmopolitan atmosphere with multiethnic and multicultural communities. Following are the demographic indicators of the district.

== Demographics ==
Historical population
Year	Pop.	±% p.a.
1951	222,848	—
1961	277,356	+2.21%
1972	460,649	+4.72%
1981	575,962	+2.51%
1998	931,694	+2.87%
2017	1,488,372	+2.50%
2023	1,639,897	+1.63%

As of the 2023 census, Sukkur district has 268,588 households and a population of 1,639,897. The district has a sex ratio of 113.04 males to 100 females and a literacy rate of 58.26%: 68.10% for males and 47.20% for females. 539,351 (33.18% of the surveyed population) are under 10 years of age. 814,999 (49.70%) live in urban areas.

=== Religion ===
Religions in Sukkur district (2023)
Religion	Percent
Islam	95.90%
Hinduism	3.63%
Christianity	0.40%
Other	0.07%

The majority religion is Islam, with 95.9% of the population. Hinduism (including those from Scheduled Castes) is practiced by 3.63% of the population.

Religion in contemporary Sukkur District
Religious group	1941		2017		2023	
Religious group	Pop.	%	Pop.	%	Pop.	%
Islam	185,249	63.46%	1,430,376	96.10%	1,558,888	95.9%
Hinduism	102,132	34.99%	52,902	3.55%	59,032	3.63%
Sikhism	3,794	1.30%	—N/a	—N/a	232	0.01%
Christianity	260	0.09%	4,192	0.28%	6,499	0.40%
Others (Note: Including Jainism, Christianity, Buddhism, Zoroastrianism, Judaism, Ad-Dharmis, or not stated)	478	0.16%	902	0.07%	816	0.06%
Total Population	291,913	100%	1,488,372	100%	1,625,467	100%
Note: 1941 census data is for Pano Aqil, Rohri and Sukkur taluks of Sukkur District, which roughly corresponds to contemporary Sukkur District.

Religious groups in Sukkur District (British Sindh era)
Religious group	1872		1881		1891		1901		1911		1921		1931		1941	
Religious group	Pop.	%	Pop.	%	Pop.	%	Pop.	%	Pop.	%	Pop.	%	Pop.	%	Pop.	%
Islam	628,662	80.99%	684,275	80.22%	728,661	79.59%	797,882	78.37%	414,671	72.25%	358,396	70.23%	440,148	70.56%	491,634	70.99%
Hinduism (Note: 1872 census: Also includes Tribals, Jains, Buddhists, and Nanakpanthis (Sikhs). 1881 census: Also includes Tribals and Nanakpanthis (Sikhs). 1891 census: Also includes Tribals. 1901 census: Also includes Tribals and Nanakpanthis (Sikhs).)	147,224	18.97%	167,896	19.68%	185,813	20.3%	218,829	21.49%	155,156	27.03%	148,188	29.04%	177,467	28.45%	195,458	28.22%
Christianity	238	0.03%	736	0.09%	522	0.06%	492	0.05%	585	0.1%	481	0.09%	827	0.13%	648	0.09%
Zoroastrianism	39	0.01%	64	0.01%	71	0.01%	66	0.01%	96	0.02%	123	0.02%	123	0.02%	59	0.01%
Judaism	1	0%	9	0%	27	0%	31	0%	5	0%	0	0%	10	0%	10	0%
Buddhism	—N/a	—N/a	6	0%	0	0%	0	0%	0	0%	0	0%	0	0%	0	0%
Jainism	—N/a	—N/a	0	0%	1	0%	0	0%	3	0%	16	0%	2	0%	0	0%
Sikhism	—N/a	—N/a	—N/a	—N/a	402	0.04%	—N/a	—N/a	3,295	0.57%	2,146	0.42%	5,180	0.83%	4,696	0.68%
Tribal	—N/a	—N/a	—N/a	—N/a	—N/a	—N/a	—N/a	—N/a	30	0.01%	942	0.18%	0	0%	51	0.01%
Others	63	0.01%	0	0%	0	0%	813	0.08%	72	0.01%	0	0%	22	0%	0	0%
Total population	776,227	100%	852,986	100%	915,497	100%	1,018,113	100%	573,913	100%	510,292	100%	623,779	100%	692,556	100%
Note1: British Sindh era district borders are not an exact match in the present-day due to various bifurcations to district borders — which since created new districts — throughout the region during the post-independence era that have taken into account population increases. Note2: District formerly named Shikarpur District and was renamed to Sukkur District in 1901, following district headquarter relocation from Shikarpur City to Sukkur City. Note3: District bifurcated in 1901 to create Larkana District.

=== Language ===
Languages of Sukkur district (2023)
1. Sindhi (86.1%)
2. Urdu (9.00%)
3. Punjabi (1.74%)
4. Others (3.21%)

At the time of the 2023 census, 86.06% of the population spoke Sindhi, 9.0% Urdu and 1.74% Punjabi as their first language.

== List of Dehs ==
The following is a list of Sukkur District's dehs, organised by taluka:

- City Sukkur Taluka (1 deh)
  - New Sukkur
- New Sukkur Taluka (21 dehs)
  - Abad Jagir
  - Alif Katco
  - Anghaho
  - Arain
  - Bagerji
  - Belo Bagerji
  - Belo Bindi
  - Belo Shah Belo
  - Belo9 Qadirpur
  - Deda
  - Dreha
  - Farash
  - Goseji
  - Katcho Mando Dero Dero
  - Mubrakpur
  - Naseer Abad
  - Old Sukkur
  - Pacco Bindi Dhareja
  - Rehuja
  - Saeedabad
  - Tanmachani
- Pano Aqil Taluka (96 dehs)
  - Agro
  - Aro
  - Arrero
  - Baghpai
  - Bahman
  - Baiji New
  - Baiji Old
  - Bakabad
  - Belo Abad Malhani
  - Belo Bahab
  - Belo Hingoro
  - Belo Khia Belo
  - Belo Kotho
  - Belo Qadir Dino
  - Belo Sadhuja
  - Belo Shah Belo
  - Belo Shahpur
  - Bhandki
  - Bhullo
  - Bilhani
  - Bindi Tharachani
  - Birth
  - Bohi
  - Budh
  - Chanjani Chachar
  - Chanjani Jatoi
  - Chechero
  - Dadloi
  - Dandh Marhari
  - Doghar
  - Drib
  - Erazi Sadiki
  - Farakpur
  - Gagni
  - Gajaro
  - Garkho
  - Garwar
  - Gharee
  - Haleji
  - Hasul
  - Hingoro
  - Hussain Beli
  - Indharki
  - Janaji
  - Jhabero
  - Jhan Khan
  - Junas
  - Katcho Kadirdino
  - Katcho No. 1
  - Katcho No. 2
  - Katcho Qasimpur
  - Katcho Shahpur
  - Katta
  - Khan Belo
  - Kharaj
  - Kot Sadik Shah
  - Lanjari
  - Lathwaro
  - Liskani
  - Machi
  - Mangarki
  - Meehoi
  - Mian Kundho
  - Miranpur Sadiki
  - Mubarakpur
  - Nangroro
  - Naro Amul Hatti
  - Naro Hamthar
  - Nindapur
  - Nirch
  - Nouraja New
  - Nouraja Old
  - Nowlai
  - Ochihar
  - Pacco Bindi Shahpur
  - Pano Aqil
  - Pano Ghulam Ali
  - Pano KharKhaso
  - Panwari Jagir
  - Panwari Rayaeti
  - Qadirdino Bindi
  - Roophar
  - Sabni
  - Sadhuja
  - Salhani
  - Sangi Kotai
  - Sarai
  - Shahpur
  - Sorho
  - Sugro
  - Sultanpur
  - Sunder Belo
  - Talli
  - Tarar
  - Thikratho
  - Ural
- Rohri Taluka (67 dehs)
  - Abad
  - Abejano
  - Abra
  - Akbarpur
  - Allah Abad
  - Arkohar
  - Arore
  - Begmanji
  - Bhiro
  - Boraha
  - Bundtari
  - Chak No. 2
  - Chak No. 3
  - Chak No. 4
  - Cheel
  - Dadah
  - Dakhano
  - Dalho
  - Dhandhi
  - Dodanko
  - Dring Belo
  - Dubarwahan
  - Fakirabad
  - Gatanwari
  - Ghulam Goth
  - Gidraro
  - Hamanloi
  - Hamanloi Jagir
  - Hosho Shaheed
  - Ibupota
  - Jani Abad
  - Jhangro
  - Kalari
  - Kalhori
  - Kandhra
  - Kandri
  - Katcho Ali Wahan
  - Katcho Mando Dero
  - Katohar
  - Katper
  - Khadhari
  - Khahi Jagir
  - Khoori
  - Kot Mir Yako
  - Kotari
  - Larh Jagir
  - Mandodero
  - Mangarki
  - Mangria
  - Mari
  - Mari Janullah Shah
  - Miani Bagat
  - Nabi Shah
  - Nandho Kohistan
  - Panhwar
  - Patni
  - Ponath
  - Rohri
  - Saeedabad (Rohri)
  - Sangrar
  - Seerahi
  - Subhanpur
  - Tirore
  - Trimoh Takar
  - Trimoonh
  - Umerkas
  - Wado Kohistan
- Saleh Patt Taluka (87 dehs)
  - Badal Fakeer
  - Badeji
  - Bago
  - Bahadurio
  - Bajar Waro
  - Bargah
  - Barro
  - Beebai Daro
  - Behan Wari
  - Berrido
  - Bitri
  - Chak No. 5
  - Chanareji
  - Chogan Waro
  - Chuganwari
  - Chutto Khouh
  - Dhulwaro
  - Draban Waro
  - Dubbo
  - Dubi
  - Gagro
  - Gandaho
  - Garang
  - Garhar
  - Goni
  - Gurand
  - Hussain Shah
  - Ihsan Wari
  - Januji
  - Kanheja
  - Kartar
  - Khabar Waro
  - Khabariro
  - Khabri Bhit
  - Khipro
  - Khorore
  - Khosanjo Kumb
  - Khuni Khambharo
  - Lairo
  - Laiwari
  - Lakhaji No. 1
  - Lakhaji No. 2
  - Looli Takar
  - Lundi Bhit
  - Lundiro
  - Lundo
  - Mahar
  - Malaho
  - Malik
  - Mamro
  - Manikwari
  - Matto MAngrio
  - Muhib Shah
  - Murado
  - Nihrad
  - Panhwari
  - Phat
  - Phulokri
  - Pir Buxji Bhit
  - Pir Karo
  - Rajar
  - Registan Kartar
  - Registan Mamro
  - Rip
  - Sadano
  - Sadri
  - Sahi Pat
  - Sanghar
  - Sanhari
  - Sahnaro
  - Setharo
  - Shadmano
  - Shah Nawaz Shah
  - Siran Waro
  - Soomarji
  - Soonharo
  - Sunhari Takar
  - Tarai
  - Thomi
  - Tooryoun
  - Udhar
  - Ukri Takar
  - Umerji
  - Umerji Kandun
  - Veenghko
  - Viyari
  - Wass

== Bibliography ==
- 1998 District census report of Sukkur. Census publication. Vol. 41. Islamabad: Population Census Organization, Statistics Division, Government of Pakistan. 1999.
