= Ghotki =

Ghotki: گھوٹکی; گهوٽڪي
- City
- Location of Ghotki Ghotki (Pakistan)
- Coordinates: 28.1°N 69.19°E
- Country: Pakistan
- Province: Sindh

Government
  - Type: Municipal Committee
  - Chairman: Asif Razaq Khan
  - Vice Chairman: Vacant
- Elevation: 72 m (236 ft)

Population (2023)
  - City: 119,879
  - Rank: 103rd in Pakistan
- Time zone: UTC+5 (PST)

Ghotki (Urdu: گھوٹکی; Sindhi: گهوٽڪي) is a city in northern Sindh, Pakistan, and the headquarter of Ghotki District. Its population as of 2023 is 120,000. Ghotki is famous for its date palms.

According to Mirza Kalich Beg, Ghotki was founded by Pir Mohsin Shah during 1447 and had also constructed a glorious mosque. He has written that the previous name of Ghotki was لوہے صاحبان.

== Demographics ==
=== Population ===
Historical population
Year	Pop.	±% p.a.
1951	5,881	—
1961	6,956	+1.69%
1972	19,275	+9.71%
1981	28,837	+4.58%
1998	52,823	+3.62%
2017	111,398	+4.01%
2023	119,879	+1.23%

According to 2023 census, Ghotki had a population of 119,879.

Languages

Languages of Ghotki MC (2023 Census)
1. Sindhi (88.9%)
2. Urdu (7.60%)
3. Punjabi (1.60%)
4. Others (1.90%)

== Law and order situation ==
The district of Ghotki is facing a serious law and order issue with numerous incidents daily of kidnappings, murders, and robberies. The challenging aspect of the problem is that these incidents are occurring in remote "kutcha areas" (riverine areas) with difficult-to-access routes.

The cabinet approved the proposal for the procurement of military-grade weapons and surveillance systems worth Rs2.79 billion to combat kidnapping and attacks on police forces in the riverine areas of Ghotki, Shikarpur, and Sukkur districts.The Home department was directed to seek an NOC from the Ministry of Interior for the purchase. The Sindh police planned to procure drone technology to use the unmanned aerial vehicles not only for surveillance but also for targeting bandits in riverine areas of the province.

Outlaws found safe havens in the difficult terrain of four hard-to-reach districts - Ghotki, Sukkur, Shikarpur, and Kashmore. Drones were previously used by the army during Zarb-i-Azab, but now law enforcement agencies use them extensively in counter-terrorism and to combat urban terrorism. This marks a major shift in operational techniques used by law enforcement agencies, including the Counter-Terrorism Department.

== Gas reserves ==
OGDCL has discovered gas from Umair South East-1 well in Guddu Block, Sindh. The well tested 1.063 MMSCFD of gas from Pirkoh Formation during drilling in May 2022. The discovery of 1.063 MMSCFD of gas from Pirkoh Formation was a result of the Guddu Joint Venture Partners' exploration strategy. OGDCL operates the Guddu Block with 70% stake. About 1050 meters of drilling estimated 5.1 million square feet of gas, which would help overcome gas shortage in Sindh province.

Mari Petroleum Company Limited (MPCL) has begun supplying gas from the Tipu compartment of the Goru-B reservoir, located in Sindh province's Ghotki district. Sui Northern Gas Pipelines Limited (SNGPL) will initially receive 20 mmscfd of pipeline quality gas after processing at MPCL's Sachal Gas Processing Complex (SGPC), with an additional 90 mmscfd planned for supply later in the year.

== See also ==
- Ghotki rail crash
- 2019 Ghotki riots
