= Sukkur Division =

Administrative division of Sindh

Coordinates: 27°15′N 69°00′E

Sukkur Division سکھر ڊويزن
- Division
- Map of Sukkur Division
- Country: Pakistan
- Province: Sindh
- Capital: Sukkur
- Established: 1 April 1936
- Khairpur Division: 1955 – 1971
- Sukkur Division: 1971 – Continue

Government
  - Type: Divisional Administration
  - Commissioner: Mr. Ghulam Mustafa Phul
  - Regional Police Officer: N/A

Area
  - Division: 27,158 km^{2} (10,486 sq mi)

Population (2023)
  - Division: 6,010,041
  - Density: 221.3/km^{2} (573/sq mi)
  - Urban: 2,038,644 (33.92%)
  - Rural: 3,971,397

Literacy
  - Literacy rate: Total: (59.72%); Male: (71.62%); Female: (46.99%)

Sukkur Division (Sindhi: سکر ڊويزن) is one of the six administrative Divisions of the Sindh Province of Pakistan. It is located in Northern Sindh which is locally called the Uttrad Region. This level of administration was abolished in 2000 but restored again on 11 July 2011. CNIC code of Sukkur Division is 45.

Sukkur is the divisional headquarters of Sukkur Division, which comprises the following three districts:

- Ghotki
- Khairpur
- Sukkur

== History ==
On 1 April 1936 when Sind division separated from Bombay Presidency and established a Province.

On One Unit Policy Sind province merged into West Pakistan province on 30 September 1955 Create Khairpur Division when the State of Khairpur merged in Pakistan.

Pakistan Government merged the khairpur state into Sind province and gave the status of a district.

The Sukkur district was also include in khairpur Division. Later in 1971 when the Sind province was restored the divisional status was shifted from khairpur to Sukkur. khairpur remain a district of Sukkur Division.

== Demographics ==
=== Population ===
Historical population
Year	Pop.	±% p.a.
1951	...	—
1961	...	—
1972	...	—
1981	2,103,861	—
1998	3,447,935	+2.95%
2017	5,538,555	+2.53%
2023	6,010,041	+1.37%

According to 2023 census, Sukkur division had a population of 6,010,041, roughly equal to the population of Norway or the US state of Maryland.

=== Languages ===
Languages of Sukkur Division (2017)
1. Sindhi (91.7%)
2. Urdu (3.50%)
3. Punjabi (2.00%)
4. Saraiki (1.00%)
5. Others (1.70%)

== List of the districts by population over the years ==
#	District	Population (2023)	Population (2017)	Population (1998)	Population (1981)	Population (1972)	Population (1961)	Population (1951)
1	Ghotki	1,772,609	1,646,318	968,797	...	...	...	...
2	Khairpur	2,597,535	2,404,334	1,547,751	...	...	...	...
3	Sukkur	1,639,897	1,487,903	931,387	...	...	...	...
	Total	6,010,041	5,538,555	3,447,935	...	...	...	...

== List of the districts by area, population, density, literacy rate etc. ==
#	District	Headquarter	Area (km²)	Pop. (2023)	Density (ppl/km²) (2023)	Lit. rate (2023)
1	Ghotki	Mirpur Mathelo	6,083	1,772,609	291.3	41.38%
2	Khairpur	Khairpur	15,910	2,597,535	163.3	50.14%
3	Sukkur	Sukkur	5,165	1,639,897	317.7	58.26%

== List of the Tehsils ==
Tehsil	Area (km²)	Population (2023)	Density (ppl/km²) (2023)	Literacy rate (2023)	Districts
Daharki Tehsil	2,088	335,145	160.51	36.84%	Ghotki District
Ghotki Tehsil	763	540,939	708.96	45.96%	Ghotki District
Khan Garh Tehsil (Khanpur)	1,986	162,318	81.73	39.01%	Ghotki District
Mirpur Mathelo Tehsil	593	350,647	591.31	42.66%	Ghotki District
Ubauro Tehsil	653	383,560	587.38	38.39%	Ghotki District
Faiz Ganj Tehsil	946	243,254	257.14	46.43%	Khairpur District
Gambat Tehsil	582	286,129	491.63	52.89%	Khairpur District
Khairpur Tehsil	585	465,233	795.27	59.37%	Khairpur District
Kingri Tehsil	531	370,304	697.37	49.04%	Khairpur District
Kot Diji Tehsil	520	385,872	742.06	45.29%	Khairpur District
Nara Tehsil	11,611	173,968	14.98	34.47%	Khairpur District
Sobho Dero Tehsil	504	293,160	581.67	49.88%	Khairpur District
Thari Mirwah Tehsil	631	379,615	601.61	51.22%	Khairpur District
New Sukkur Tehsil	109	356,473	3,270.39	57.96%	Sukkur District
Pano Akil Tehsil	1,042	457,078	438.65	58.54%	Sukkur District
Rohri Tehsil	807	421,500	522.30	49.93%	Sukkur District
Salehpat Tehsil	2,957	137,738	46.58	34.50%	Sukkur District
Sukkur Tehsil	250	267,108	1,068.43	79.43%	Sukkur District

== Constituencies ==
Provincial Assembly Constituency	National Assembly Constituency	District
PS-18 Ghotki-I	NA-198 Ghotki-I	Ghotki
PS-19 Ghotki-II	NA-198 Ghotki-I	Ghotki
PS-20 Ghotki-III	NA-199 Ghotki-II	Ghotki
PS-21 Ghotki-IV	NA-199 Ghotki-II	Ghotki
PS-24 Sukkur-III	NA-200 Sukkur-I	Sukkur
PS-25 Sukkur-IV	NA-200 Sukkur-I	Sukkur
PS-22 Sukkur-I	NA-201 Sukkur-II	Sukkur
PS-23 Sukkur-II	NA-201 Sukkur-II	Sukkur
PS-26 Khairpur-I	NA-202 Khairpur-I	Khairpur
PS-27 Khairpur-II	NA-202 Khairpur-I	Khairpur
PS-28 Khairpur-III	NA-203 Khairpur-II	Khairpur
PS-29 Khairpur-IV	NA-203 Khairpur-II	Khairpur
PS-30 Khairpur-V	NA-204 Khairpur-III	Khairpur
PS-31 Khairpur-VI	NA-204 Khairpur-III	Khairpur

== See also ==
- Sukkur
- Siro (Region)
