= NA-198 Ghotki-I =

Constituency of the National Assembly of Pakistan

- Constituency for the National Assembly of Pakistan
- Region: Ubauro and Daharki Tehsils and Mirpur Mathelo Tehsil (partly) including Mirpur Mathelo city of Ghotki District
- Electorate: 455,286

Current constituency
- Party: Pakistan People's Party
- Member: Khalid Ahmed Khan Lund
- Created from: NA-200 Ghotki-I

NA-198 Ghotki-I (این اے-198، گھوٹکی-1) is a constituency for the National Assembly of Pakistan.

== Assembly Segments ==
Constituency number	Constituency	District	Current MPA	Party
18	PS-18 Ghotki-I	Ghotki District	Jam Mehtab Hussain Dahar	PPP
19	PS-19 Ghotki-II	Ghotki District	Sardar Nadir Akmal Khan Leghari	PPP

== Election 2002 ==
General elections were held on 10 October 2002. Khalid Ahmed Khan Lund of PPP won by 68,296 votes.

General election 2002: NA-200 Ghotki-I
Party	Candidate	Votes	%	±%
PPP	Khalid Ahmed Khan Lund	68,296	62.82	
Independent	Mian Farooq Ahmed	35,126	32.31	
MQM	Abdullah Malik	3,033	2.79	
Others	Others (five candidates)	2,255	2.08	
Turnout		112,656	40.00	
Total valid votes		108,710	96.50	
Rejected ballots		3,946	3.50	
Majority		33,170	30.51	
Registered electors		281,656		

== Election 2008 ==
General elections were held on 18 February 2008. Mian Abdul Haq Alias Mian Mitho of PPP won by 59,022 votes.

General election 2008: NA-200 Ghotki-I
Party	Candidate	Votes	%	±%
PPP	Abdul Haque Alias Mian Mitha	59,022	41.43	
PML(Q)	Khalid Ahmed Khan Lund	50,223	35.26	
Independent	Ali Mohammad Khan Mahar	32,532	22.84	
Others	Others (eleven candidates)	677	0.47	
Turnout		149,555	50.51	
Total valid votes		142,454	95.25	
Rejected ballots		7,101	4.75	
Majority		8,799	6.17	
Registered electors		296,064		
PPP hold				

== Election 2013 ==
General elections were held on 11 May 2013. Ali Gohar Khan Mahar of PPP won by 86,579 votes and became the member of National Assembly.

General election 2013: NA-200 Ghotki-I
Party	Candidate	Votes	%	±%
PPP	Ali Gohar Khan Mahar	86,579	51.41	
Independent	Khalid Ahmed Khan Lund	76,615	45.49	
Others	Others (sixteen candidates)	5,230	3.10	
Turnout		176,707	60.58	
Total valid votes		168,424	95.31	
Rejected ballots		8,283	4.69	
Majority		9,964	5.92	
Registered electors		291,682		
PPP hold				

== Election 2018 ==
General elections were held on 25 July 2018.

General election 2018: NA-204 Ghotki-I
Party	Candidate	Votes	%	±%
PPP	Khalid Ahmed Khan Lund	99,889	48.94	
Independent	Abdul Haque Alias Mian Mitha	91,752	44.96	
MMA	Muhammad Yousif	7,406	3.63	
Independent	Mian Rafique Ahmed	1,351	0.66	
Independent	Muhammad Ishaque Laghri	1,118	0.55	
Independent	Shahbaz Ahmed Khan Lund	1,016	0.50	
PJDP	Abdul Wahab	555	0.27	
Independent	Hallar Khan Pittafi	438	0.21	
Independent	Jam Waseerm Ahmed	414	0.20	
PRHP	Lutfullah	155	0.08	
Turnout		214,154	58.38	
Total valid votes		204,094	95.30	
Rejected ballots		10,060	4.70	
Majority		8,137	3.99	
Registered electors		366,842		
PPP hold				

== Election 2024 ==
Elections were held on 8 February 2024. Khalid Ahmed Khan Lund won the election with 120,259 votes.

General election 2024: NA-198 Ghotki-I
Party	Candidate	Votes	%	±%
PPP	Khalid Ahmed Khan Lund	120,259	51.10	▲2.16
Independent	Abdul Haque Alias Mian Mitha	90,629	38.51	▼6.45
PTI	Abdul Sattar (Note: Filed nomination papers as PTI candidate but ECP allowed him to run as an Independent)	10,755	4.57	
Others	Others (eleven candidates)	13,679	5.81	
Turnout		251,157	55.16	▼3.22
Total valid votes		235,322	93.70	
Rejected ballots		15,835	6.30	
Majority		29,630	12.59	▲8.60
Registered electors		455,286		
PPP hold				

== See also ==
- NA-197 Qambar Shahdadkot-II
- NA-199 Ghotki-II
