= Arghun–Langah War =

Sindh conquest of Multan

- Part of Arghun Conquest of Sindh
- Sindh and Multan in 1525
Date	December 1524 – January 1528
Location	Punjab and Sindh
Result	Arghun victory
Territorial changes	Annexation of the Langah Sultanate by Arghun dynasty: Fall of the Langah Sultanate; Multan ceded to the Mughal Empire

Belligerents
Arghun Sultanate	Langah Sultanate

Commanders and leaders
Husayn Beg Arghun Commanders: Mahmud Khan Arghun; Mirza Miskin Tarkhan; Mirza Mohib Tarkhan; Mirza Isa Tarkhan; Mir Fazil Kokaltash; Baba Ahmad †; Abul Fatah #; Mir Qasim; Mir Muhammad Quli; Mir Farrukh Mir; Sultan Muqim Beglar; Mir Mahmud Sarbani; Mir Abu Muslim; Mir Farrukh Arghun; Sultan Quli Beglar; Sumbul Khan; Dost Mir Akhor; Shamsuddin Mahoni	Mahmud Shah Langah II X Husseyn Shah Langah II Commanders: Sheikh Shuja ul-Mulk Bukhari (POW); Iqbal Khan Langah; Langar Khan Langah; Quwam Khan Langah; Bahlol Raizada Langah (executed); Tahir Khan Nahar; Rahmu Dahar; Jam Jeevan Dahar; Banda Dahar; Rajaada Machhi

Strength
50,000	80,000–100,000

Casualties and losses
Minimal	Heavy

Arghun–Langah War, also known as Sindh–Multan War, (Note: Persian: جنگ سند ملتان, Sindhi: سنڌ ملتان جنگ, Punjabi: سندھ ملتان جنگ) was a major conflict between the Multan-based Langah dynasty and the Sindh-based Arghun dynasty from 1524 until 1528, which led to the fall of the Langah Sultanate and the incorporation of Multan, Shorkot, Uch and Derawar as autonomous territories into the Arghun Sultanate. This war strengthened the position of the Arghun dynasty as a regional power, and after ceding Multan to the Mughal Empire, it became a vital ally of Babur.

== Background ==
Multan had been ruled by the Langah dynasty since the first half of the 15th century. After the death of Sultan Husseyn Langah in 1502, his son Budha Khan ascended the throne as Mahmud Shah Langah II. His reign was infamous for widespread corruption, brutality, injustice, and poor governance. In 1520, the Arghun dynasty under Shah Shuja Beg invaded Sindh, where the Samma dynasty, an ally of the Langah dynasty, was weakening under Jam Feroz. Shuja Beg was able to capture Bukkur and establish it as his capital. He died in 1524 and was succeeded by his son, Shah Husayn Beg, who launched a second invasion of Sindh in October 1524 and successfully captured Thatta.

== Early skirmishes ==
The Mahar tribe of Mirpur Mathelo, a town on the border of the Sindh Sultanate, harbored enmity toward the Dahar and Machhi tribes of Ubauro and Bhutta Wahan, border towns of the Multan Sultanate, due to their frequent raids and acts of robbery. In December 1524, members of the Mahar tribe lodged a complaint with Husayn Beg Arghun, who then dispatched Baba Ahmad, the son of Mir Fazil Kokaltash. Baba Ahmad launched a raid on the areas in and around Ubauro and Bhutta Wahan, returning to Mirpur Mathelo with the plunder.

In response, the Dahar tribe lodged a complaint with the Kiladar of Seorai, who personally led a contingent into Mirpur Mathelo and carried out widespread looting. However, on his return, he was intercepted by Baba Ahmad near Ubauro. Baba Ahmad decisively defeated the Kiladar’s forces and captured several Dahar tribesmen. Acting on Husayn Beg’s orders, Baba Ahmad then advanced deep into Langah territory, raiding the towns of Walhar and Kundai. On his return, he also plundered areas inhabited by the Mahar tribe. As a result of these campaigns, Ubauro was annexed into the Sindh Sultanate.

Soon after, the Balochs of Seorai, seeking revenge, captured several camels from Arghun territory. In response, Baba Ahmad led 300 men to recover the stolen animals. He succeeded in killing the raiders but was severely wounded in an ambush at Bhutta Wahan. He later succumbed to his injuries near Mirpur Mathelo. Baba Ahmad’s younger brother, Abul Fatah, set out to avenge his brother’s death, accompanied by his father-in-law Mir Qasim and nephew Mir Muhammad Quli. He launched an attack on Rahmu Dahar and his tribesmen, captured Fort Mao Mubarak, and negotiated a settlement with Langah agents, establishing Bhutta Wahan as the new border. However, Abul Fatah died of hyperthermia due to extreme heat.

== First invasion (1525–1526) ==
=== Delegation to Lahore ===
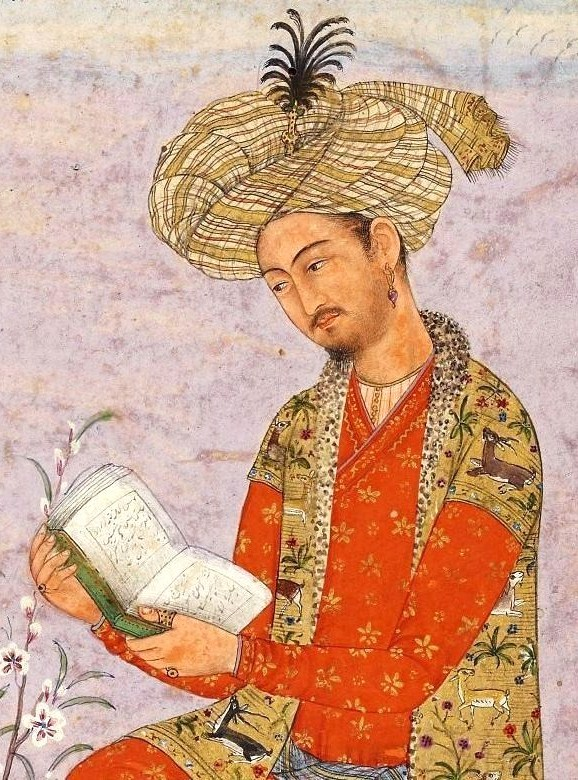
Babur, on whose orders Husayn Beg attacked Multan

In 1524, Babur, the Emir of Kabul, captured Lahore and began preparations to seize Delhi from the Delhi Sultanate. Frustrated by the misrule and excesses of the Langahs, the people of Multan sent a delegation to Lahore to seek Babur’s assistance. In response, Babur wrote to Husayn Beg Arghun, instructing him to lead his forces into Multan and liberate the region from Langah control.

=== Preparations of Husayn Beg Arghun ===
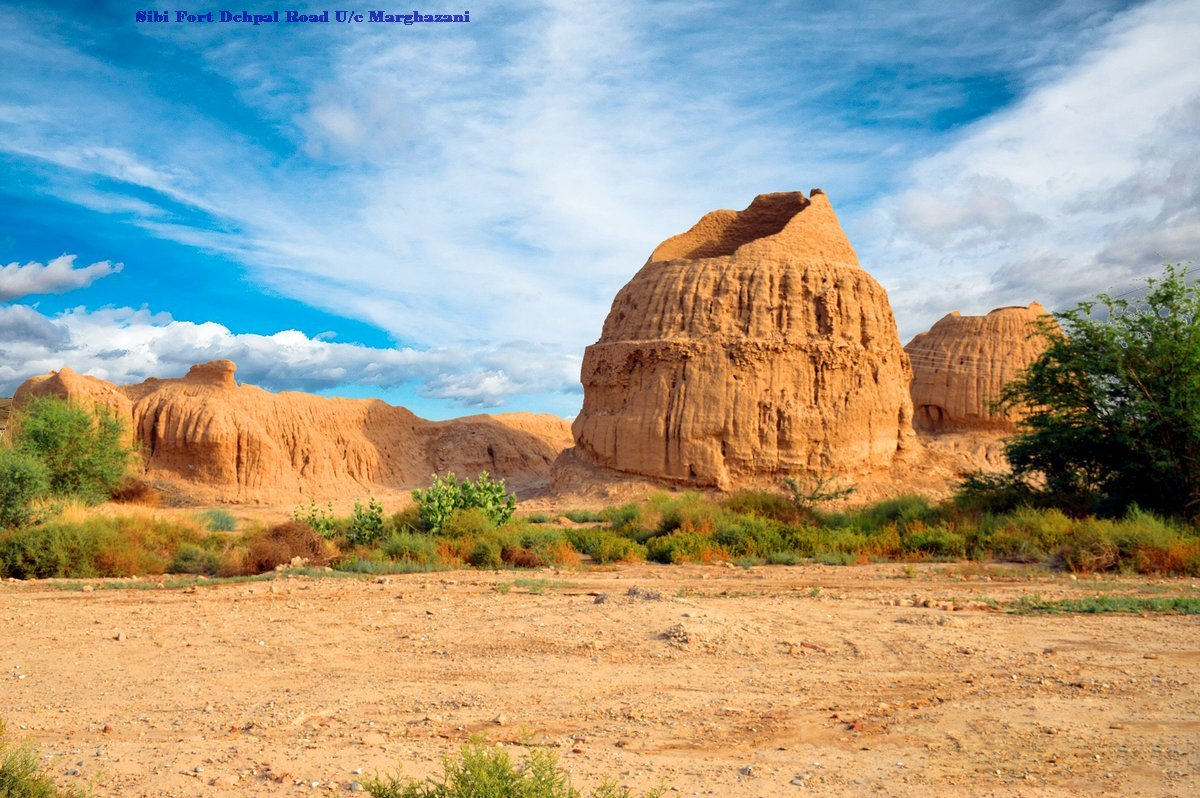
Sibi Fort was a primary base of the Arghun dynasty

Husayn Beg took Babur’s orders with utmost seriousness. He first assembled the Tarkhans, followed by summoning the Hazaras of Sibi. To secure his route, he launched a campaign against the Rind and Bugti tribes, defeating them and compelling them to remain neutral in the conflict. As a precaution, he took their waderas and sardars with him to Bukkur as hostages to ensure compliance. He also appointed the Kokaltash family to lead parts of his army.

=== Siege of Seorai and Mao Mubarak Forts ===
In 1525, Husayn Beg set out from Bukkur and launched a campaign against the regions surrounding Seorai Fort, laying waste to nearby settlements. He established his camp near a lake and dispatched Sultan Mahmud Khan Bukkuri with 200 men to confront the Baloch defenders. The Balochs engaged Mahmud Khan outside the fort but were swiftly defeated and forced to flee, abandoning the stronghold. Mahmud Khan entered the fort and secured it. On the following day, he reported the victory to Husayn Beg, who then moved from his camp and entered the fort with his army. Realizing the fort’s strategic position and potential threat in enemy hands, Husayn Beg instructed Mahmud Khan to raze it to the ground.

Afterwards, Husayn Beg advanced to the Fort of Mao Mubarak and began inspecting its defences. During his stay, he met the revered Sufi saint Sheikh Ruhullah, son of Sheikh Hammad Qureshi. Sheikh Ruhullah informed him of the dire condition of the fort’s non-combatants and pleaded for their protection. In response, Husayn Beg dispatched Mirza Miskin Tarkhan with a contingent of troops, instructing him to spare anyone who sought refuge in the mausoleum of Sheikh Hammad Qureshi. Miskin Tarkhan successfully defeated the Langah and Baloch defenders, capturing many of them.

Three days later, Husayn Beg entered the fort and paid a visit to Sheikh Ruhullah, who again requested clemency—this time for Rahmu Dahar. However, Husayn Beg refused and left the decision to Sultan Mahmud Khan, as Rahmu Dahar was responsible for the deaths of his brothers. Rahmu Dahar, seeking mercy, presented his niece—the daughter of Jam Jeevan Dahar—to Mahmud Khan as a gesture of reconciliation. Moved by the offer, Mahmud Khan accepted it and chose to forgive him.

Husayn Beg then dispatched Mohib Tarkhan to confront the Lar tribe of Jajja, while he himself set up camp in their territory. During this period, he was visited by Banda Dahar, a noble from Multan, who formally submitted to him. In return, Husayn Beg honoured him with a khilat and appointed him to serve under Mahmud Khan. Meanwhile, Mohib Tarkhan successfully defeated the Lar tribe, securing the region.

=== Conquest of Uch ===
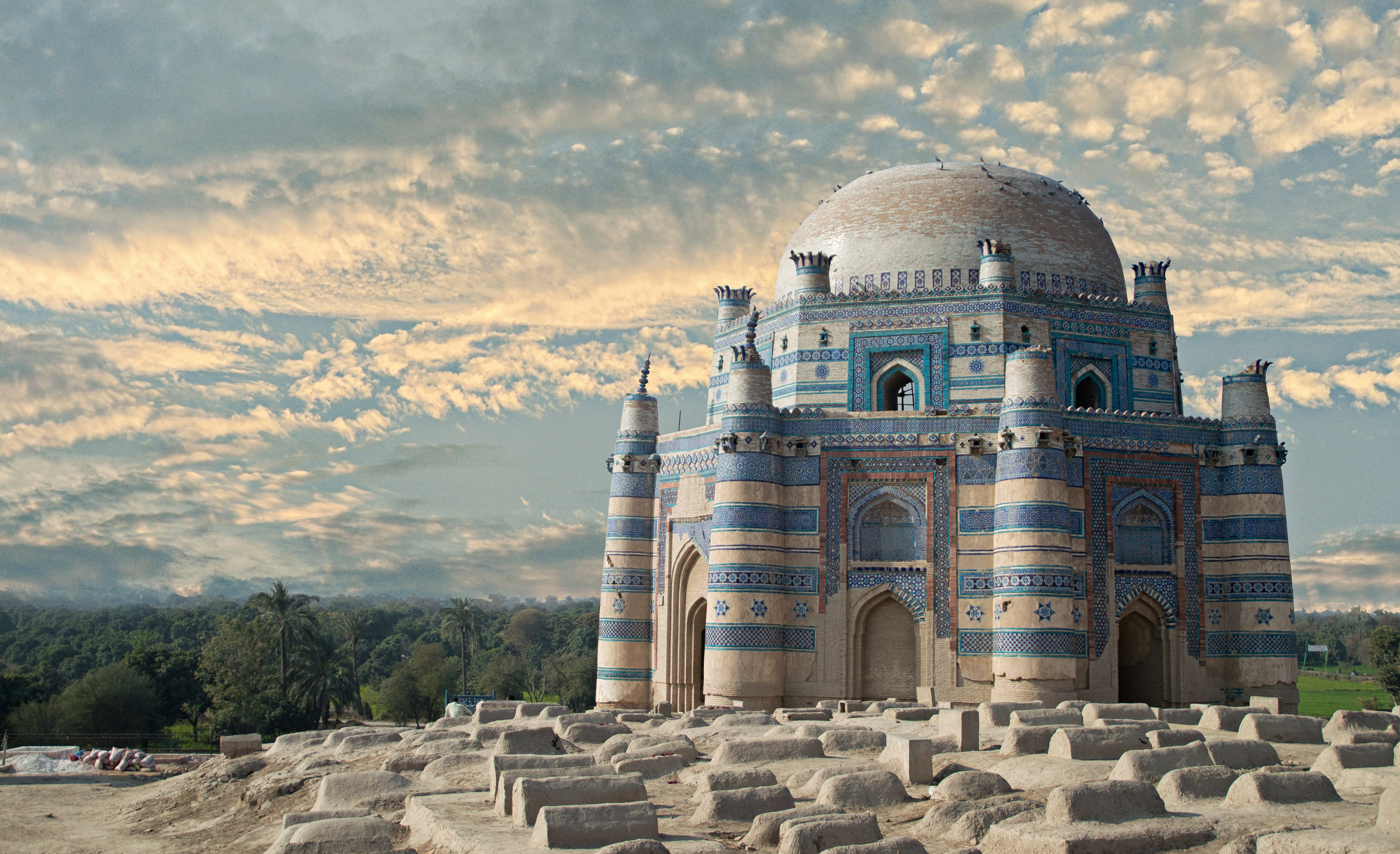
Tomb of Bibi Jawindi was also damaged during the war

Near the city of Uch, Husayn Beg encountered a large Langah force composed of Baloch and Nahar troops, led by a Langah sardar from Multan who had arrived to defend the city. The Balochs commanded the rearguard while the Nahars led the vanguard. Though the Langah army outnumbered the Arghuns, Husayn Beg organized his forces strategically: the right flank was led by Mirza Miskin Tarkhan and Mirza Isa Tarkhan, the left by Mir Farrukh Mir, the vanguard by Sultan Mahmud Khan and Sultan Muqim Beglar, and the rearguard by Mir Mahmud Sarbani and Mir Abu Muslim. Husayn Beg himself took a position in the centre alongside Mir Farrukh Arghun and Sultan Quli Beglar.

The battle commenced with a charge by the Arghun vanguard, met by a volley of arrows from the Langah lines. A powerful assault by the Arghun right flank forced many Langah soldiers to retreat, while the left flank's pressure broke their morale. Several Langah leaders, including Bahlol Raizada Langah, were captured and executed. The defeated Langah troops fled and took refuge within the fort of Uch.

The troops inside the fort of Uch reinforced their positions as the Arghun army began the siege. Defenders mounted the walls and towers, hurling stones and firing arrows at the attackers. The Arghuns eventually broke through the gate, initiating fierce combat within the fort. To demoralize the defenders, Husayn Beg ordered the severed heads of captured Langah leaders to be mounted on spears and displayed. The tactic succeeded, causing panic among the defenders on the walls, many of whom abandoned their posts.

The Arghun forces pushed deep into the fort, and on Husayn Beg’s orders, began a brutal massacre of the city’s inhabitants. Homes and public buildings were destroyed, and thousands were slaughtered. Eventually, a delegation of scholars—including Sayyid Zain ul-Abidin Bukhari, Sheikh Ibrahim, Sheikh Ismail, Qazi Abul Khair, and Qazi Abdul Rehman—appealed to Husayn Beg to end the bloodshed. Moved by their plea, he agreed and ordered his troops to spare all who submitted and to kill only those who resisted.

=== Preparations of Mahmud II and peace treaty with Husayn Beg ===
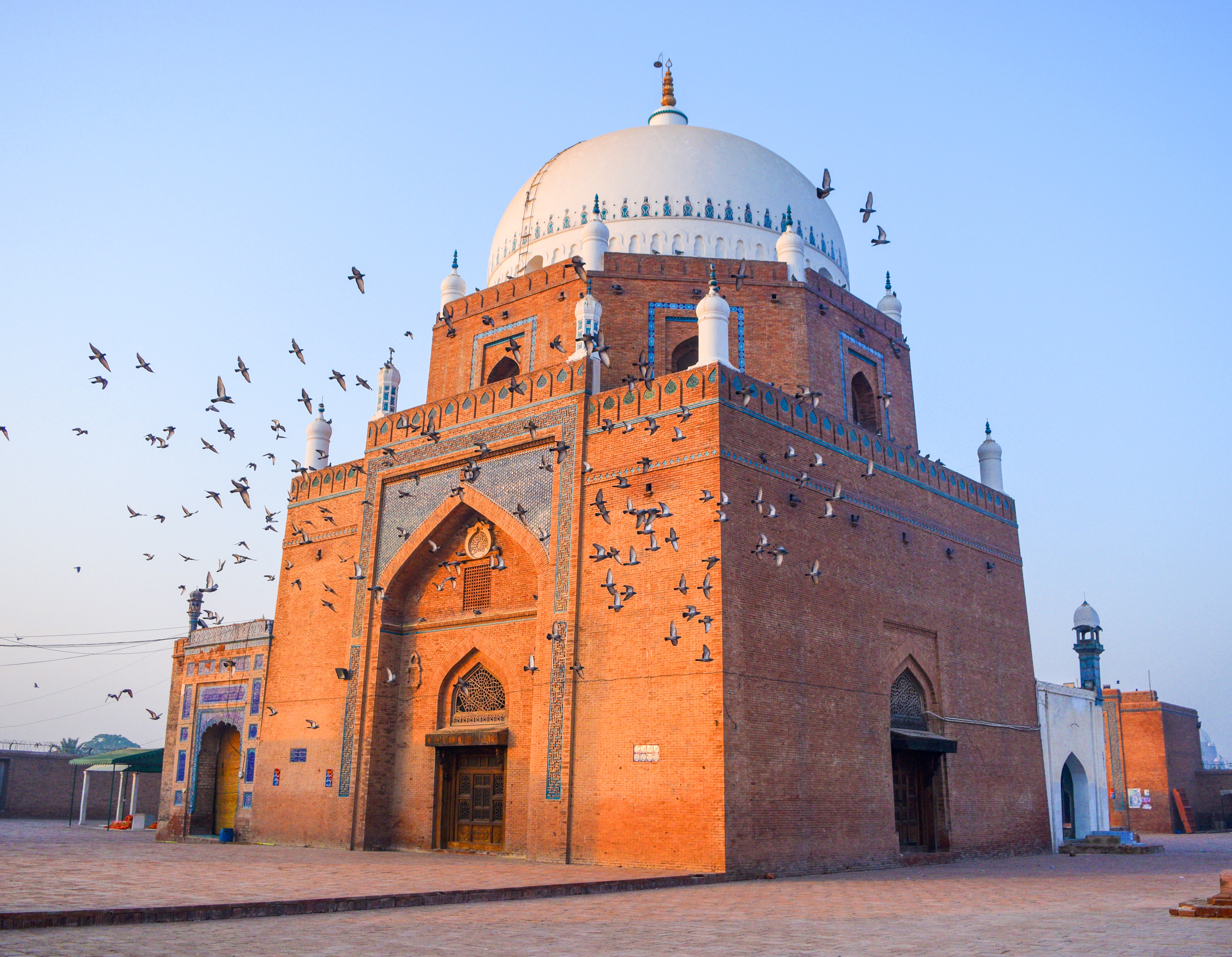
Multan-Shrine of Bahauddin Zakariya

After the fall of Uch, Sultan Mahmud Shah Langah, also known as Mahmud II, recognized the growing threat posed by Husayn Beg Arghun and took decisive steps to defend his rule. Within a month, he mobilized a formidable force of 80,000 to 100,000 troops, drawing support from powerful local tribes including the Jatoi, Rind, Dodai, Chandio, Mirani, Korai, and Nahar. With this coalition, Mahmud Langah marched out of Multan and established his camp on one bank of the Sutlej River, setting the stage for confrontation. On the opposite bank, Husayn Beg Arghun positioned his forces.

Despite assembling a massive army, Mahmud chose diplomacy over open conflict. His decision to seek peace caused division among his nobles, splitting them into pro-war and pro-peace factions. He sent Sheikh Bahauddin Qureshi, the Sajjada Nashin of Bahauddin Zakariya, along with Maulana Bahlol, as emissaries to negotiate with Husayn Beg Arghun. After extended talks, a peace treaty was finalized, setting the Sutlej River as the new boundary between the two kingdoms.

As a gesture of goodwill, Husayn Beg gifted Bahauddin Qureshi with horses, camels, and cash, then withdrew to Uch, where he focused on reinforcing its fortifications. However, the treaty weakened Mahmud's position. Several of his nobles, including Iqbal Khan Langah, openly defected to Husayn Beg, while others like Langar Khan Langah and Quwam Khan Langah formed secret alliances with the Arghun leader, further undermining Mahmud’s authority. Mahmud Shah Langah rejected the peace treaty brought by Bahauddin Qureshi, calling it a defeat for his kingdom. That night, he was mysteriously found dead. Many suspected he was poisoned by Langar Khan Langah, who was secretly aligned with Husayn Beg Arghun.

=== Capture of Derawar Fort and return to Sindh ===
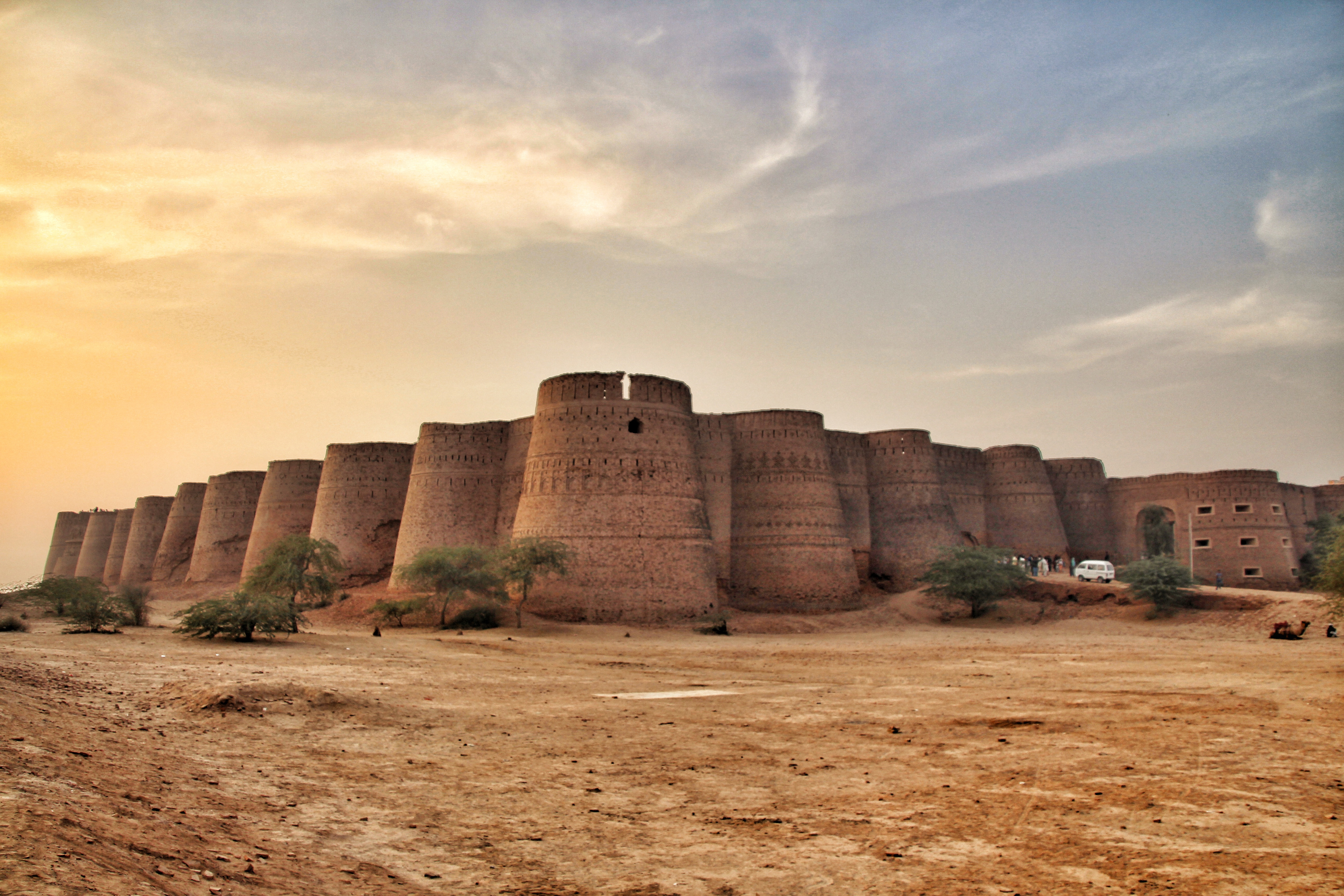
Derawar Fort was one of the most strategically important fort in the vicinity of Multan

Upon hearing of Mahmud Langah’s death, Husayn Beg halted his return and was joined by Langar Khan, Quwam Khan, and Iqbal Khan, who refused to recognize the 3-year-old Husseyn Shah Langah II, set up by Mahmud Langah’s mother. Backed by both of them, Iqbal revealed that the Langah royal treasures were buried in Derawar Fort. To claim them, Husayn Beg issued a firman declaring all land south of the Sutlej, including Derawar, belonged to the Arghuns. However, Ghazi Khan, the Kiladar of Derawar, refused to comply and stayed loyal to the Langahs. On 13 April 1526, Husayn Beg sent an army with supplies for a month and dispatched Sumbul Khan with Arghun, Turk, and Mongol forces—infantry, cavalry, and artillery—to besiege the fort, setting up tents on all four sides. Special caution was taken due to Derawar’s size and its isolated location in the Cholistan Desert.

On the third day of the siege, the Arghuns dug thirty-three wells, ensuring water for their troops. By the fourth day, Husayn Beg arrived from Uch, intensifying the siege. As days passed, Derawar’s defenders ran low on supplies, with no aid in sight. Sumbul Khan breached the front wall and tower by digging two holes. In response, defenders hurled fire buckets and hot coal, but Arghun troops used shields on their heads and scaled the walls. Fierce combat followed, with both sides fighting desperately. Eventually, the Arghuns prevailed, killing or capturing many Langah defenders. Husayn Beg secured the treasure and distributed part of it to his soldiers; the rest was sent to Bukkur by bullock carts. On the fifteenth day, in May 1526, he reached Bukkur and held a grand feast to celebrate his victory.

== Siege of Multan (1526–1528) ==
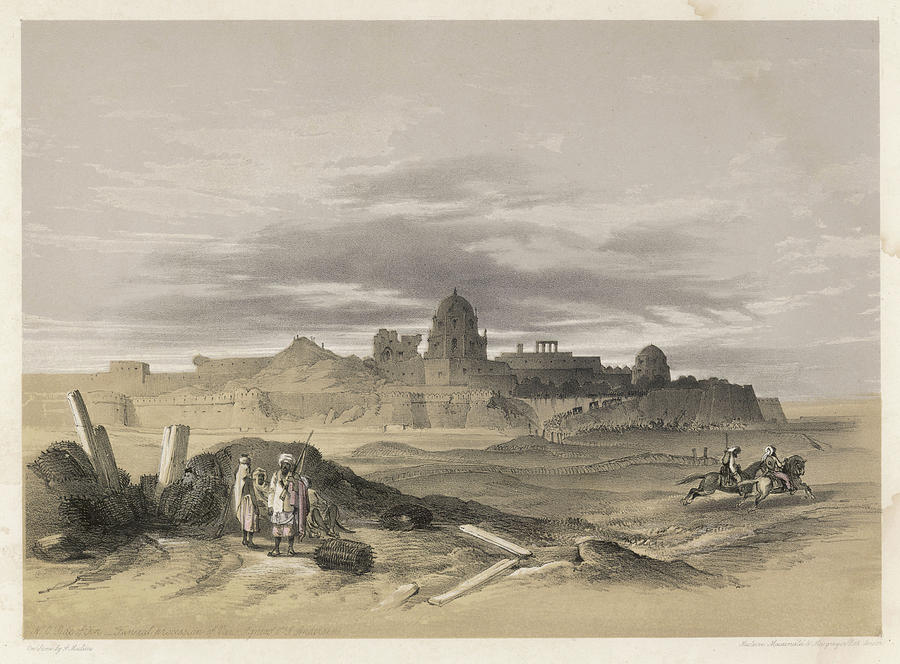
North East side of the Multan Fort

Langar Khan Langah travelled to Sindh and urged Husayn Beg Arghun to invade Multan again, exploiting internal conflicts between Vizier Sheikh Shuja ul-Mulk Bukhari, the royal family, and corrupt nobles. In December 1526, Husayn Beg first sent Mirza Miskin Tarkhan, then followed with an army alongside Langar Khan. Camping at Fort Mao Mubarak, he was approached by Sheikh Ismail Qureshi, an ambassador from Multan, but peace talks failed, and Qureshi was sent to Thatta. Husayn Beg then marched toward Multan, destroying towns including Thatta Ghulwan. A final peace attempt by Shuja ul-Mulk, sending his brother and Husseyn II's brother, also failed—Husayn Beg demanded that both leaders swear allegiance outside the fort, which they refused.

Husayn Beg initiated the siege of Multan's fort and city. However, after a few days, the defenders launched a surprise attack by opening the gates, killing many Arghun soldiers. In response, Husayn Beg repositioned his forces to the eastern side of the fort and tightened the siege from all four directions. Although the Arghuns attempted to scale the fort walls, the defenders successfully repelled them for several months, even launching counterattacks beyond the fort walls. As the siege dragged on, supplies inside the fort began to dwindle.

As the siege of Multan continued, several nobles and military officers advised Vizier Shuja ul-Mulk to confront the Arghun forces in an open battle to end the prolonged stalemate. However, he declined, fearing that such a move might lead to mass desertion among his ranks. Over time, conditions within the fort deteriorated severely. Food scarcity led to extreme inflation, with a bullock’s head selling for 10 Takas and a maund of grain reaching 100 Takas. The lack of provisions and discipline resulted in the garrison looting the civilian population, many of whom fled the city and sought refuge in the Arghun camp under Husayn Beg.

On 4 January 1528, Husayn Beg launched a major assault on the city. The iron gate of Multan was breached, and Arghun troops entered the city. A large-scale massacre followed, with men aged between seven and seventy reportedly killed. Wealthy residents were stripped of their possessions, and numerous civil officials were arrested. Only those who took refuge in the mausoleum of Shah Yousuf Gardezi were spared.

Following twelve days of plunder, Mohib Tarkhan and his troops entered the already weakened fort, initiating further killings. Most Langah soldiers were either killed in combat, surrendered, or captured. The violence extended to those who had taken shelter in the mausoleum of Bahauddin Zakariya. The Arghuns eventually seized complete control of the fort, capturing Vizier Shuja ul-Mulk, Sultan Husseyn II, members of the royal family, and large quantities of treasure, jewelry, and valuable items.

After a week of looting and bloodshed, Husayn Beg ordered his forces to cease all violence within the city and fort.

== Aftermath ==
Following the Arghun victory, the Khutbah was read, and coinage was issued in the name of Husayn Beg, signifying the formal transfer of sovereignty over Multan. Sultan Husseyn II, along with his brother and sister, were spared through the intercession of Sheikh Bahauddin Qureshi. The three were placed under the custody of Miskin Tarkhan, who later married the Sultan’s sister and relocated the group to Sindh. Other surviving members of the Langah royal family were also granted clemency.

In contrast, Vizier Shuja ul-Mulk and several Langah nobles were imprisoned and subjected to routine torture. The Arghun administration reportedly implemented widespread reprisals against the inhabitants of Multan. Individuals possessing wealth were frequently harassed, while those of noble descent faced public humiliation, including flogging and confiscation of property. Members of the former royal family were also subjected to such treatment. Traders and merchants were restricted in their movements and activities, further contributing to the economic decline of the city.

Several chroniclers described these actions as one of the most severe atrocities committed against the population of Multan. The only prominent figure exempted from public humiliation was the Sufi saint Sheikh Bilal, who openly criticized Husayn Beg, referring to him as a cruel ruler. Upon hearing this, Husayn Beg reportedly confronted Sheikh Bilal in Sindh and subjected him to public humiliation. In response, Sheikh Bilal denounced him as a tyrant.

Husayn Beg remained in Multan for approximately two months but did not implement any efforts to rebuild or restore the city. He eventually departed for Thatta via Bukkur after receiving reports of a potential invasion by Khengarji I of Kutch. In his absence, he appointed Dost Mir Akhor and Khwaja Shamsuddin Mahoni to lead a force of 200 cavalry, 100 infantry, and accompanying artillery to maintain control over Multan. Langar Khan was designated as their deputy.

Langar Khan is credited with initiating efforts to restore civic order and rehabilitate the city. His administration reportedly succeeded in reviving much of Multan’s former status and stability.

Shamsuddin Mahoni and Langar Khan jointly administered Multan. However, in December 1528, Langar Khan expelled Shamsuddin Mahoni and assumed sole control of the city. Rather than continuing Arghun rule, he chose to align with Babur, formally transferring the administration of Multan to the Mughal Empire. Husayn Beg also relinquished his claim to Multan and presented the city to Babur as a gift.

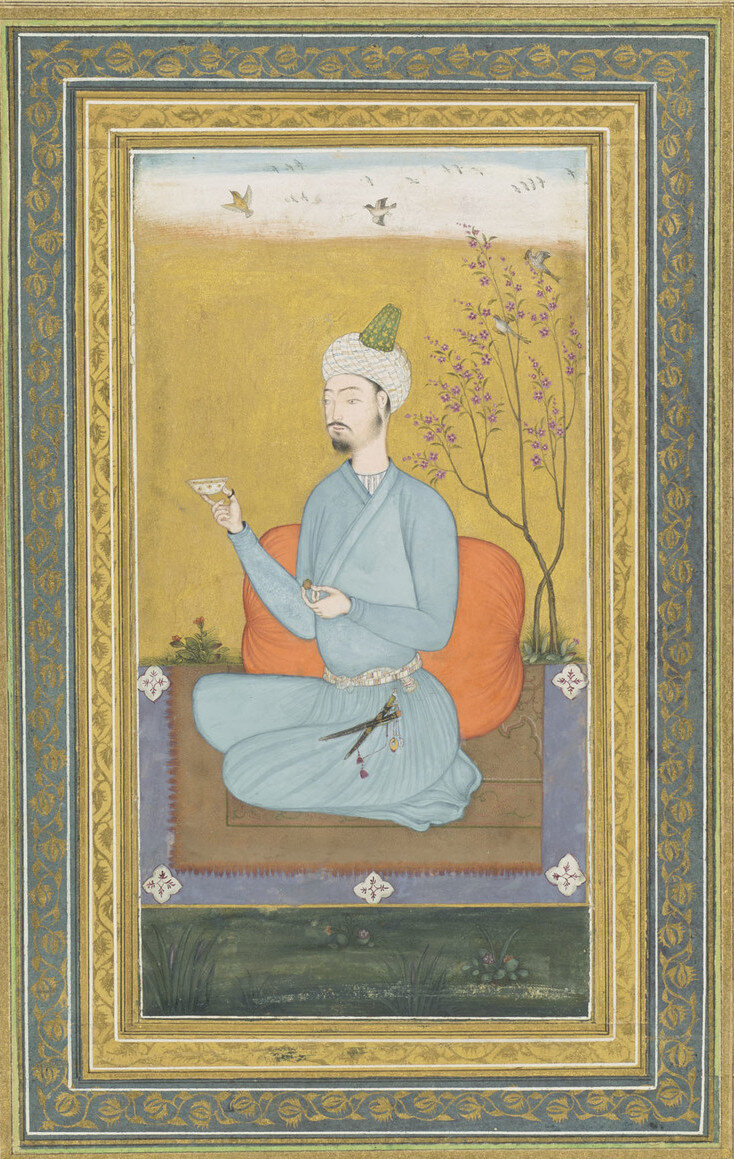
Kamran Mirza, the son of Babur

Babur initially granted Multan as a jagir to his son Askari Mirza, appointing Langar Khan as the city's administrator. In February 1529, the jagir was reassigned to Kamran Mirza, though effective governance was placed in the hands of Muhammad Kokaltash, as Kamran remained in Kandahar and Kabul. Langar Khan and Kokaltash cooperated closely in administering the region and successfully repelled attacks by Baloch forces.

By 1530, Mirza Kamran had taken direct control of Lahore and Multan, granting Langar Khan jagirs in Kandahar and a residence in Lahore. Although the Langah dynasty had ceased to rule, its influence persisted for a time. Bakhshu Khan Langah, a member of the former royal family, retained his jagirs near Multan with confirmation from Sher Shah Suri in 1541 and later entered his service during the campaign against Humayun.
