= Dahar (tribe) =

Sindhi tribe of Pakistan

Dahar or Daher (Sindhi: ڏهر) is a Sindhi Sammat tribe. The Daharki city is named after this tribe. It is one of the prominent tribes in Ghotki.

== Notable people ==
- Jam Mehtab Hussain Dahar
- Jam Mumtaz Hussain Dahar
- Jam Abdul Razzaq Khan Dahar
- Jam Muneer Ahmed Dahar
