= PS-19 Ghotki-II =

Constituency of the Provincial Assembly of Sindh, Pakistan

- Constituency for the Provincial Assembly of Sindh
- Region: Daharki Tehsil (partly) including Daharki city and Mirpur Mathelo Tehsil (partly) including Mirpur Mathelo city in Ghotki District
- Electorate: 231,940

Current constituency
- Member: Vacant
- Created from: PS-7 Ghotki-III

PS-19 Ghotki-II (پی ایس-19، گھوٹکی-2) is a constituency of the Provincial Assembly of Sindh.

== General elections 2024 ==
Provincial election 2024: PS-19 Ghotki-II
Party	Candidate	Votes	%	±%
Independent	Sardar Nadir Akmal Khan Leghari	56,429	50.61	
PPP	Abdul Bari Pitafi	44,197	39.64	
Independent	Noor Muhammad Khan Lund	4,586	4.11	
Independent	Mujeeb Ur Rehman Marnaz (Note: Filed nomination papers as PTI candidate but ECP allowed him to run as an Independent)	2,377	2.13	
TLP	Saif Raza Aka Moenuddin Shah	1,502	1.35	
Others	Others (twelve candidates)	2,408	2.16	
Turnout		118,547	51.11	
Total valid votes		111,499	94.06	
Rejected ballots		7,048	5.94	
Majority		12,232	10.97	
Registered electors		231,940		

== General elections 2018 ==
Contesting candidates	Party affiliation	Votes polled

== General elections 2013 ==
Contesting candidates	Party affiliation	Votes polled

== General elections 2008 ==
Contesting candidates	Party affiliation	Votes polled

== See also ==
- PS-18 Ghotki-I
- PS-20 Ghotki-III
