= Maroowala =

Village in Sindh, Pakistan

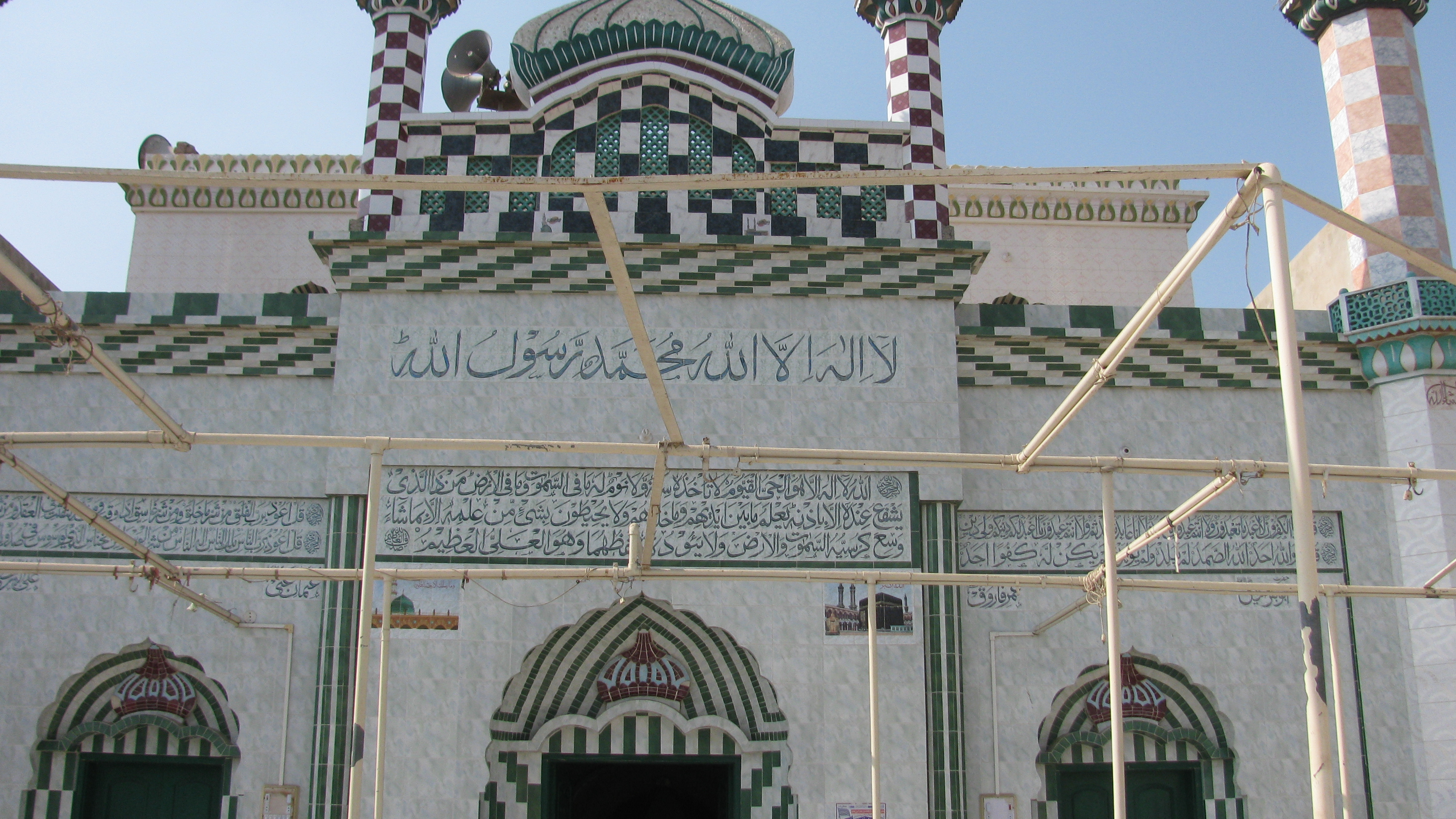
Jamia Masjid Tauheed at Village Maroowala

Maroowala or Marowalla is a village in Ghotki District in the Sindh province of Pakistan. It is situated about 110 kilometres (68 mi) from Sukkur, and between Daharki and Ubauro, near Reti. The people of this village are Muslim and by surname they are Chachar. In Maroowala, there is a primary school, high school, girls' high school, cricket ground, government hospital and a nearby railway station named Reti. This village has a population of about 2000.
