= Daho =

Daho may refer to:

== People ==
- Daho Ould Kablia (born 1933), Algerian politician
- Najib Daho (1959–1993), English boxer
- Étienne Daho (born 1956), French singer

== Places ==
- Daho, Burkina Faso
- Bago Daho, Pakistan
- Ouakpé-Daho, Benin

== Other ==
- Daho-Doo language
- Daho Sejan, a character in the 2023 action-adventure video game Star Wars: Jedi Survivor
