= Sarhad =

Sarhad (lit. 'border' in Persian) may refer to:

== People ==
- Sarhad Khan, Mughal general
- Sarhad Yawsip Jammo (1941-2025), Iraqi-born American Chaldean Catholic prelate

== Places ==
- Sar Hadd, in Iran
- Sarhad District, in Iran
- Sarhad Province, old name of Khyber Pakhtunkhwa Province in Pakistan
- Sarhad, Sindh, a town in Sindh, Pakistan
- Sarhad, Afghanistan, a village in Badakhshan district, Afghanistan

== Films ==
- Sarhad, a 1960 Indian Hindi-language film
- Sarhad: The Border of Crime, a 1995 Indian Hindi-language film
- Sarhad (unreleased film), an unreleased Indian film produced in 1976 by J. P. Dutta

== See also ==
- Sarhad Paar, a 2006 Indian Hindi-language action drama film by Raman Kumar
- Sarhadein, an Indian TV series
