= Abdul Haq (politician) =

Pakistani politician and Muslim cleric

Member of the National Assembly of Pakistan
- In office 2008–2013
- Constituency: NA-200 (Ghotki-I)

Personal details
- Party: Independent; Pakistan People’s Party

Abdul Haq is a Muslim cleric and Pakistani politician. He is among the leaders of the Bharchundi Shareef Dargah, and a locally influential figure. Haq was elected to the National Assembly of Pakistan from Constituency NA-200 (Ghotki-I) as a candidate of Pakistan Peoples Party (PPP) in 2008 Pakistani general election. He received 59,022 votes and defeated Khalid Ahmed Khan Lund, a candidate of the Pakistan Muslim League (Q) (PML-Q).

Haq has been criticized for his alleged role in forcibly converting Hindus, including minors, to Islam. Haq has been the target of protests against these alleged conversions. He became the subject of media attention in 2012 after the high-profile case of Rinkle Kumari, a Hindu woman who converted to Islam in the Bharchundi Shareef Dargah. Members of the Hindu community stated that she had been kidnapped and converted against her will, and that Haq had sheltered her kidnappers and threatened her into saying she had chosen to convert.

Following his alleged involvement in the case, the PPP selected a different candidate to contest the 2013 Pakistani general election. Haq ran as an independent candidate in the 2013 general election. He received 69 votes and lost the seat to Ali Gohar Khan Mahar. In the same election, he ran for the seat of the Provincial Assembly of Sindh as an independent candidate from Constituency PS-5 (Ghotki-I) but was again unsuccessful. He received 19 votes and lost the seat to Jam Mehtab Hussain Dahar. In 2015, he was invited by former Prime Minister and Pakistan Tehreek-e-Insaf chairman, Imran Khan, to join his political party, a decision that was reversed after protests from the Hindu community. In 2021, Imran Khan's government invited him to a Council of Islamic Ideology deliberation on legislation around forced conversion, a move that was strongly opposed by activists and the Hindu community in Pakistan.

On 9 December 2022, the UK government sanctioned Abdul Haq for forced conversions and marriages of girls and women from religious minorities.

== See also ==
- Blasphemy in Pakistan
- Religious discrimination in Pakistan
- Human rights in Pakistan
