= Protocol on Visits to Religious Shrines 1974 =

The Protocol on Visits to Religious Shrines 1974 is a bilateral agreement between India and Pakistan facilitating Indian and Pakistani nationals to visit certain religious shrines in both countries. As of November 2018, fifteen locations in Pakistan and five in India are covered under this protocol.

== List of locations ==
These are a list of locations covered by the protocol:

=== In India ===
1. Ajmer Sharif Dargah, dedicated to sufi saint Moinuddin Chishti in Ajmer, Rajasthan
2. Nizamuddin Dargah, dedicated to sufi saint Nizamuddin Auliya, in Delhi
3. Amir Khusro, dedicated to Sufi musician Amir Khusro in Delhi
4. Sirhind Sharif, Mujaddid Alf Sani in Sirhind, Punjab, India
5. Kalyar Sharif, dedicated to sufi saint Alauddin Ali Ahmed Sabir, near Haridwar

=== In Pakistan ===
1. Shadani Darbar in Hyat Pitafi, Ghotki
2. Katasraj Dham in Lahore
3. Gurudwaras of Nankana Sahib
4. Gurudwara Panja Sahib, Hasan Abdal
5. Samadhi of Ranjit Singh, Lahore
6. Gurudwara Dera Sahib, Lahore
7. Gurudwara Janam Asthan, Nankana Sahib
8. Gurudwara Deewan Khana, Lahore
9. Gurudwara Shaheed Ganj, Singhanian, Lahore
10. Gurudwara Bhai Tara Singh, Lahore
11. Gurudwara of Sixth Guru, Mozang, Lahore
12. Birthplace of Guru Ram Das, Lahore
13. Gurudwara Cheveen Padshahi, Mozang, Lahore
14. Shrine of Data Ganj Bakhsh, Lahore
15. Mirpur Mathelo, Sindh
