= Raes Esso Chachar =

Village in Pakistan

Coordinates: 28°04′30″N 69°49′17″E

Raes Esso Chachar is a village in Ghotki District, Sindh Province, Pakistan.
