= Bhagat Kanwar Ram =

Sindhi Sufi singer and poet

Bhagat Kanwar Ram (1885 – 1939) was a Sindhi Sufi singer and poet. He was a disciple of saint Satram Das Sahib of Raharki.

== Early life ==
Kanwar Ram was born to Tarachand Morira and Tirath Bai on 13 April 1885 in the Jarwar village of Sukkur (Sakhar) district in Sind, British India. He was assassinated by religious extremists at the Ruk railway station in the Sukkur district in November 1939. He was popular among both Hindu and Muslim Sindhi communities of Sindh.

Bhagat Kanwarram, an Indian Sindhi-language film on the poet's life directed by Dharam Kumar released in 1952. Commemorative stamp was issued by Indian President Pratibha Patil on 26 April 2010.
