= Sain Wari =

Sain Wari سائیں واری
- Border Town
- Location within Sindh
- Coordinates: 27.48951861658683°N 69.77125967679835°E
- Country: Pakistan
- Province: Sindh
- District: Ghotki
- Time zone: UTC+05:00 (PKT)

Sain Wari (Marwari: سیں واری, Sindhi: سائين وار) is a border town in Ghotki district, Sindh, in Pakistan. It is close to the India-Pakistan border.
