= Jam Abdul Razzaq Khan Dahar =

Pakistani politician

- ڄام ممتاز حسين ڏهر

Member of the Provincial Assembly of Sindh
- Constituency: PS-1 Sukkur
- In office 30 march 1977 – 5 July 1977

Jam Abdul Razzaq Khan Dahar (Sindhi: ڄام عبدالرزاق خان ڏاهر) was a Pakistani politician from Ubauro, Ghotki District who has been Member of Provincial Assembly of Sindh from 30 March till 5 July 1977 PS1 Sukkur.
