= Moomal Ji Mari =

Archaeological site in Sindh, Pakistan

Moomal Ji Maari
- مومل جي ماڙي (Sindhi)
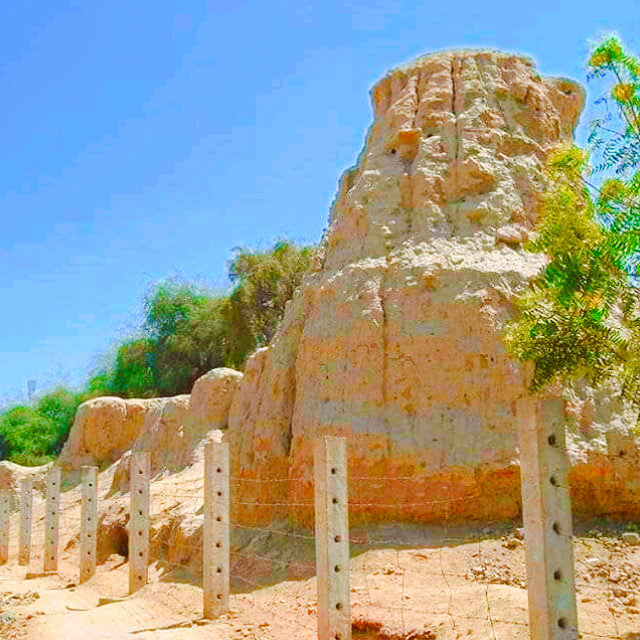
- Periods: 19 January 590 – 17 June 1631
- Associated with: Moomal
- Location: Mirpur Mathelo, Ghotki District Sindh, Pakistan

Moomal Ji Mari (Sindhi: مومل جي ماڙي) is an archaeological site in a village near Mirpur Mathelo in the Ghotki District of Sindh, Pakistan. It is located on a high mound 8 km (5.0 mi) from Ghotki city, and is surrounded by a fort or fortress.

The site is spread over an area of 3 acres (1.2 ha). The mound of Moomal Ji Mari is about 15-foot (4.6 m) high. Many clay toys and artifacts were found through archaeological excavation, along with the remains of walls made from baked and unbaked bricks. Glazed and unglazed shards of pottery of different kinds were observed on the mound. This palace was built around 590 AD during the reign of Rai Sahasi II, in Rai dynasty of Sindh. A cultural complex has been built by the Antiquities department, Government of Sindh. Some historians relate it to the love tale of Momal Rano.

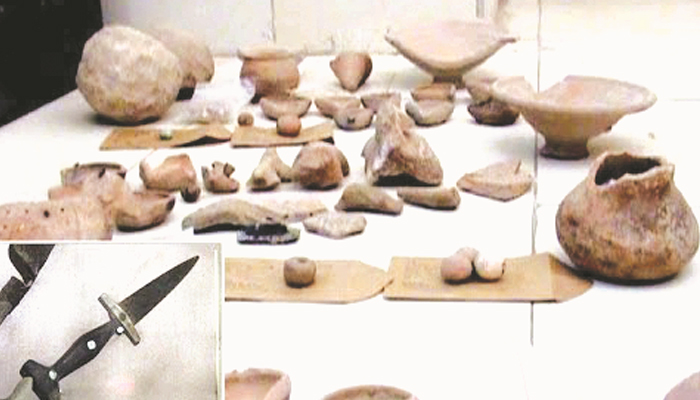

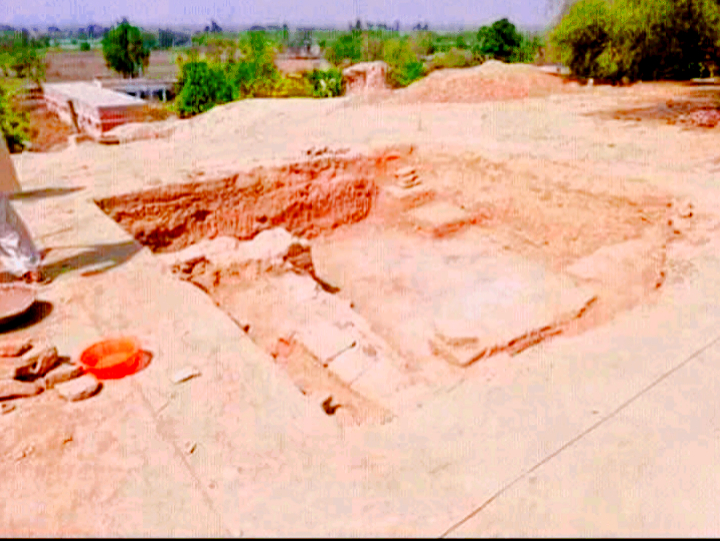

== See also ==
- Mirpur Mathelo
- Ghotki district
