= Khalid Ahmed Khan Lund =

Pakistani politician

Member of the National Assembly of Pakistan
- In office 13 August 2018 – 10 August 2023

Personal details
- Party: PPP (2019-present)

Sardar Khalid Ahmed Khan Lund is a Pakistani politician who has been a Member of the National Assembly of Pakistan since August 1998.

== Political career ==
He was elected to the National Assembly of Pakistan from Constituency NA-204 (Ghotki-I) as a candidate of Pakistan Peoples Party (PPP) in the 2018 Pakistani general election. He received 99,878 votes and defeated Abdul Haq who secured 91,739 votes.

He was re-elected to the National Assembly from Constituency NA-198 Ghotki-I as a candidate of PPP in the 2024 Pakistani general election. He received 130,259 votes and defeated Abdul Haq who secured 56,629 votes.

== Controversy ==
In 2024, journalist Nasrullah Gadani was killed in Ghotki and suspicion quickly fell on Lund and his sons because of Gadani's social media posts. After an investigation, Lund was exonerated of any involvement in Gadani's murder, but his two sons were charged with conspiring to kill him.
