= Jam Muneer Ahmed Dahar =

Pakistani politician

- ڄام منير احمد ڏاهر

Member of the Provincial Assembly of Sindh
- Constituency: Sukkur
- In office 2 May 1972 – 13 January 1977

Personal details
- Born: 1942
- Died: 2011 (aged 68–69)

Jam Muneer Ahmed Dahar (Sindhi: ڄام منير احمد ڏاهر) was a Pakistani politician from Ubauro, Ghotki District who has been Member of Provincial assembly of Sindh from 2 May 1972 till 13 January 1977 from Sukkur Constituency.
