= Jam Mumtaz Hussain Dahar =

Pakistani politician

- ڄام ممتاز حسين ڏهر

Member of the Provincial Assembly of Sindh
- Constituency: PS-1 Sukkur
- In office 1988–1990
- In office 1990–1993
- Constituency: PS-1 Ghotki
- In office 1993–1996

Personal details
- Relations: Jam Mehtab Hussain Dahar (Son)

Jam Mumtaz Hussain Dahar (Sindhi: ڄام ممتاز حسين ڏهر) is a Pakistani politician hailing from Bashirabad village, Ubauro, Ghotki District who has been Member of Provincial assembly of Sindh thrice.

== Political career ==
Jam Mumtaz Hussain Dahar was elected as Member of Provincial assembly of Sindh from PS-1 Sukkur first in 1988 the again in 1990. in 1993 He was Elected from PS-1 Ghotki as Member of Provincial.

He is the Father of Senator Jam Mehtab Hussain Dahar. Govt. Jam Mumtaz Hussain Dahar Degree College Ubauro is named after him.
