= Malook Wali =

- Village
- Malook Wali
- Village Out Side

- Location within Sindh Location within Pakistan
- Coordinates: 28°08′13.3″N 69°32′17.3″E
- Country: Pakistan
- Province: Sindh
- District: Ghotki
- Elevation: 74 m (243 ft)

Population (2017)
  - Total: 2,559
- Time zone: UTC+5 (PST)

Malook Wali (Urdu: ملوک والی, Sindhi: ملوڪ والي) is a village in Ghotki District in Sindh province of Pakistan, north side of the Mirpur Mathelo. Its zip code is 65041, it is located at 28°08'13.3"N 69°32'17.3"E
