= Bharchundi Shareef Dargah =

Shrine in Sindh, Pakistan

Coordinates: 28.076788111465284°N 69.6879354985012°E

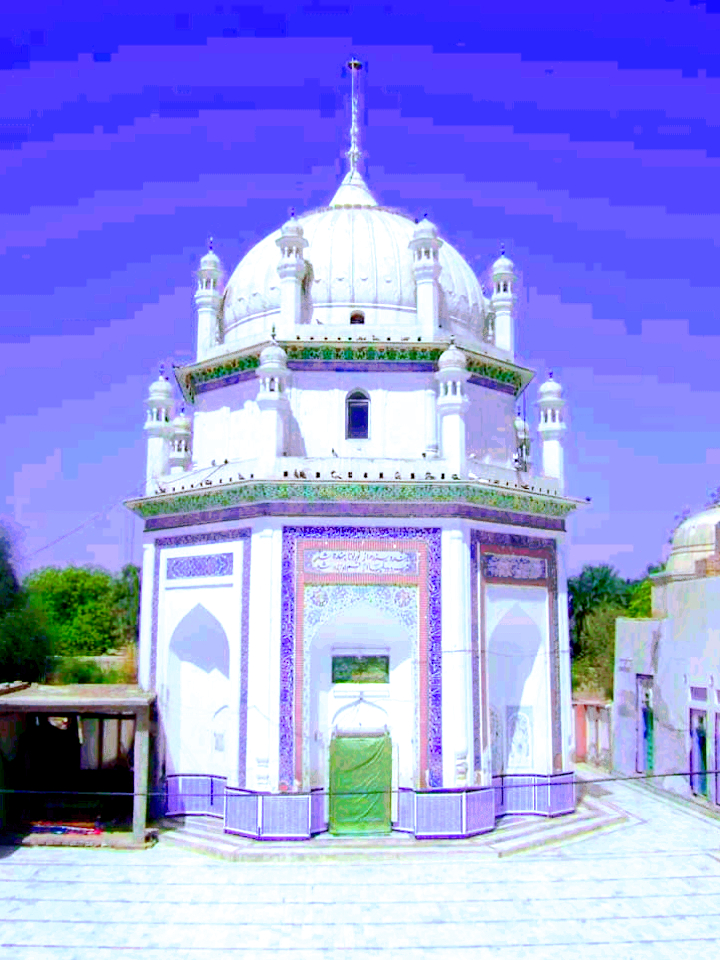
- Bhurchondi Shareef Dargah shrine

Religion
- Affiliation: Sunni Islam
- District: Ghotki
- Province: Sindh
- Rite: Qadiri

Location
- Location: Daharki
- Country: Pakistan
- Interactive map of Bharchundi Shareef Dargah

Architecture
- Type: Mosque and mausoleum

Bharchundi Shareef Dargah is a Sufi shrine situated 8 km from railway station of Daharki (Urdu: ڈھرکی) in Ghotki District in the Sindh province of Pakistan The Bharchundi Sharif is notorious for giving protection to convert to Islam and are known to have the support and protection of ruling political parties and state (alleged, denied). According to the media reports, between 2014 and 2017, more than 150 Hindu girls were allegedly forcefully converted to Islam in the Bharchundi Shariff.

== Involvement in Forced conversion ==
Dargah Bharchudi's Mian Mithu is allegedly involved in forced conversion of more than 117 underage minority girls. He is further alleged to incite violence against Hindus, especially by misusing Pakistan's blasphemy laws against non-Muslims.
