= Reti =

Reti or Réti may refer to:

== Entertainment ==
- Reti, a character in the video game Star Wars: Starfighter
- Réti endgame study, a chess endgame study by Richard Réti
- Réti Opening, chess opening named after Richard Réti
- Reti (film), a 2016 Marathi movie

== People ==
- István Réti (1872–1945), painter
- Richard Réti (1889–1929), chess master
- Rudolph Reti (1885–1957), musical analyst, composer and pianist

== Places ==
- Reti, Estonia, village in Põdrala Parish, Valga County, Estonia
- Reti, Pakistan, a town in Pakistan
- Reti, Western Australia, aka Empress Springs, a tiny place on the Great Central Road

== See also ==
- Reti, (Hindi for "sand"), in placenames like Muni Ki Reti
- Rhaetian people, an ancient confederation of Alpine tribes
