= Khangarh =

Khangarh may refer to:

- Khangarh, Punjab, in Punjab, Pakistan
- Khangarh, Sindh, in Sindh, Pakistan
