= Reti, Pakistan =

Pakistani town

Coordinates: 28°03′01″N 69°41′53″E

Reti ریتی
- Town
- Location within Sindh
- Country: Pakistan
- Province: Sindh
- District: Ghotki

Population (1998)
  - Total: 20,000
- Time zone: UTC+5 (PST)
- Number of Union councils: 1

Reti (Urdu: ریتی) is a town of Ghotki District in the Sindh province of Pakistan. It is situated about 110 kilometres (68 mi) from Sukkur, and between Daharki and Ubauro, about 30 kilometres (19 mi) from the Indian border.

There are several religious places in the town including mausoleums of Al Mahdi Imam Bargah Reti, Pir Fida Hussain Shah, Pir Gulan Shah Bukhari, Shaheed Shah Nawaz Ghoth, Kamu Shaheed, Dado Bambhlo Shaheed (near Marowala), Hazur Pir, Pir Noor Shah and Many Dargaz and Imam Bargahs.

The Reti railway station is one of the oldest railway stations in Sindh.

There is oil development in the area.

== Religion ==
The Reti is predominantly Muslim, with a small Hindu Menghwar minority.

=== Al Mahdi (A.J) Imam Bargah Reti ===
The Al Mahdi (A.J) Imam Bargah Reti is one of the oldest and most historic Imam Bargah Reti. Here is an Largest ALam Pak of Sindh.

=== Schools ===
- Govt High School Reti
- Govt Boys Primary School (Main) Reti
- Govt Girls Primary School Reti
- Govt Girls Midel School Reti
- Roshan Tara Public School Reti
- Kids Garden Public School Reti
- Shahlatif Public School Reti
