= PS-18 Ghotki-I =

Constituency of the Provincial Assembly of Sindh, Pakistan

- Constituency for the Provincial Assembly of Sindh
- Region: Ubauro Tehsil and Daharki Tehsil (partly) of Ghotki District

Current constituency
- Party: PTI
- Member: Shahar Yar Khan Shar
- Created from: PS-5 Ghotki-I

PS-18 Ghotki-I (پی ایس-18، گھوٹکی-1) is a constituency of the Provincial Assembly of Sindh.

== General elections 2024 ==
Provincial election 2024: PS-18 Ghotki-I
Party	Candidate	Votes	%	±%
Independent	Jam Mehtab Hussain Dahar	57,143	44.99	
PPP	Shahar Yar Khan Shar	55,190	43.45	
JUI (F)	Nasir Mehmood	9,029	7.11	
Others	Others (twenty candidates)	5,650	4.45	
Turnout		134,423	60.19	
Total valid votes		127,012	94.49	
Rejected ballots		7,411	5.51	
Majority		1,953	1.54	
Registered electors		223,346		

== General elections 2018 ==
Contesting candidates	Party affiliation	Votes polled

== General elections 2013 ==
Contesting candidates	Party affiliation	Votes polled

== General elections 2008 ==
Contesting candidates	Party affiliation	Votes polled

== See also ==
- PS-17 Qambar Shahdadkot-IV
- PS-19 Ghotki-II
