= Khan Garh Tehsil =

Administrative division in Sindh, Pakistan

Khan Garh Taluka
- Tehsil
- تعلقہ خان گڑھ
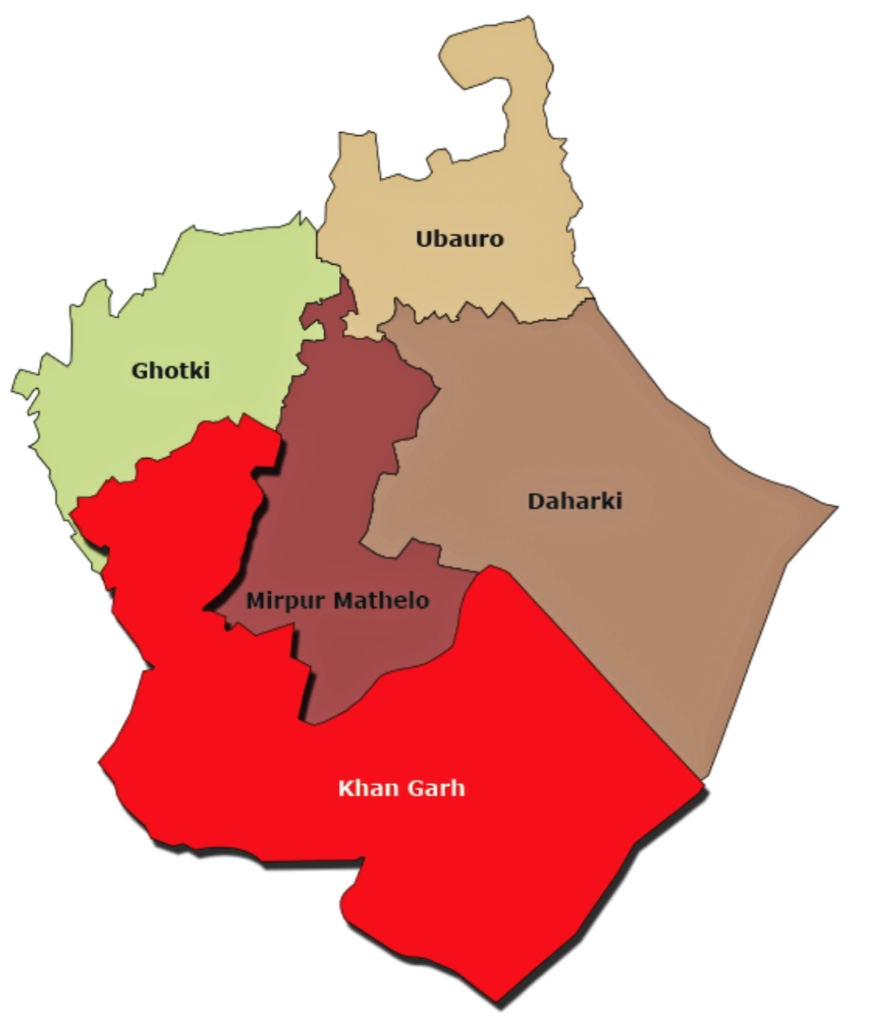

- Location within Pakistan Khan Garh Taluka (Pakistan)
- Coordinates: 27°52′N 69°25′E
- Province: Sindh
- District: Ghotki District

Population (2017 Census of Pakistan)
  - Total: 149,008
- Time zone: UTC+5 (PST)

Khan Garh Tehsil is an administrative subdivision (tehsil) of Ghotki District in the Sindh province of Pakistan. It is administratively subdivided into six Union Councils, one of which form the capital, Khangarh.
