= Dino Mako =

Pakistani village

- Village
- Dino Mako
- Location within Sindh Location within Pakistan
- Coordinates: 28.0201235°N 69.6020955°E
- Country: Pakistan
- Province: Sindh
- District: Ghotki

Dino Mako is a village of the Mirpur Mathelo Tehsil of Ghotki District in Sindh province of Pakistan.
