= Salehpat Tehsil =

Sub-district in Sindh, Pakistan

Salehpat Tehsil صالح پٹ
- City
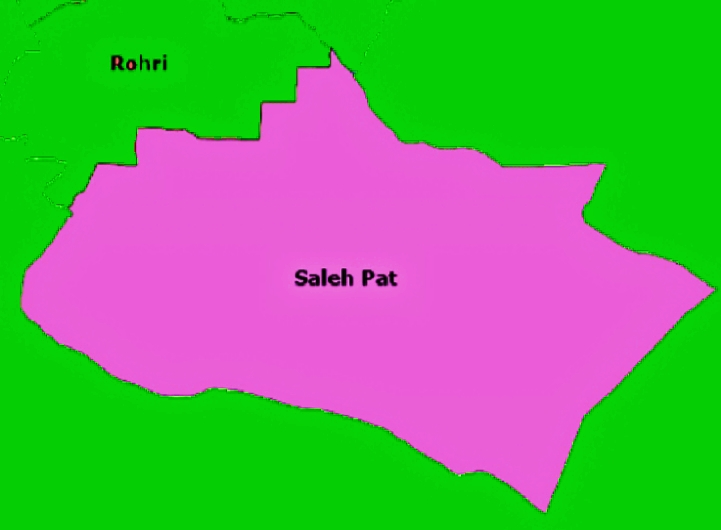

- Location within Sindh Location within Pakistan
- Coordinates: 27°31′50″N 69°10′04″E
- Country: Pakistan
- Province: Sindh
- Division: Sukkur
- District: Sukkur

Government
  - Type: municipality
- Elevation: 62 m (203 ft)

Population (2017)
  - City: 75,805
- Time zone: UTC+5 (PST)

Saleh Pat (Urdu: صالح پٹ), is a tehsil of Sukkur District in the Sindh province of Pakistan. It is located approximately 40 kilometres (25 mi) east of the city of Sukkur. It consists of 08 union councils According to 2017 Census of Pakistan, the population of Salehpat was estimated to be 129,736.
