= Khairpur Division =

Division of Pakistan

Khairpur Division was an administrative division in the West wing of Pakistan which existed from 1955 to 1975. It was established in 1955 after the merge of the Khairpur State into Pakistan. In 1970, after the dissolution of one unit scheme, it became a part of the Sind province. In 1971 it was renamed the Sukkur Division.

== History ==
The Khairpur Division was established in 1955.

At the time of establishment division was comprised on:

- District Khairpur
- District Sukkur
- District Larkana
- District Jacobabad
- District Nawabshah

Khairpur became the Sukkur Division in 1971.

== Administration ==
- Khairpur District
- Sukkur District
- Upper Sind Frontier District (now Jacobabad)
- Larkana District
- Nawabshah District
