= Shahar Yar Khan Shar =

Pakistani politician

Member of the Provincial Assembly of Sindh
- In office 13 August 2018 – 11 August 2023
- Constituency: PS-18 Ghotki-I

Personal details
- Party: JUI (F) (2025-present)
- Other political affiliations: PPP (2021-2025); PTI (2018-2021)

Shahar Yar Khan Shar is a Pakistani politician who had been a member of the Provincial Assembly of Sindh from August 2018 till August 2023.

== Political career ==
He was elected to the Provincial Assembly of Sindh as a candidate of the Pakistan Tehreek-e-Insaf (PTI) from PS-18 Ghotki-I in the 2018 Pakistani general election.

On 11 March 2021 he was expelled from the PTI for not voting for his party's candidates in the 2021 Pakistani Senate election.
