= Jajjah Abbasiyan =

Town in Punjab, Pakistan

- Village
- Location within Pakistan
- Coordinates: 28°10′N 70°42′E
- Country: Pakistan
- Province: Punjab
- District: Rahim Yar Khan

Population
  - Total: 983,415 (2,017 census) (Khanpur Tehsil population)
- Time zone: UTC+5 (PST)

Jajjah Abbasiyan is a town and union council in Khanpur Tehsil, Rahim Yar Khan District in Bahawalpur Division of Punjab, Pakistan.

The city is agriculturally strong and very important in Pakistan economically. It produces high quality dates and mangoes.
