= Jam Mehtab Hussain Dahar =

Pakistani politician

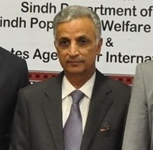
- Jam Mehtab Hussain Dahar

Education and Literacy Sindh Education and Literacy Department
- In office 2014 – 28 May 2018
- Constituency: PS-5 GHOTKI-I

Member of the Provincial Assembly of Sindh
- In office 31 May 2013 – 28 May 2018
- In office 2008–2013
- In office 2002–2007

Minister for Food and Health
- In office 2013 – November 2014

Minister Population, Welfare & Revenue
- In office 2008–2013
- Incumbent
- Assumed office 2024
- Constituency: PS-18 Ghotki-I

Personal details
- Born: 1 January 1953 (age 73) Ghotki District, Sindh, Pakistan
- Party: PPP (2002-present)
- Relations: Jam Mumtaz Hussain Dahar(Father)
- Education: Liaquat University of Medical and Health Sciences
- Occupation: Politician
- Profession: Doctor

Jam Mehtab Hussain Dahar (Sindhi: ڄام مهتاب حسين ڏھر; Urdu: جام مہتاب حسين دھر; born 1 January 1953) is a Pakistani politician hailing from Bashirabad village, Ubauro, Ghotki District. He belongs to Pakistan Peoples Party Parliamentarians. He was the minister of Education and Literacy in the Provincial Assembly of Sindh. He was elected senator from Sindh on 3 March 2021.

== Education and political career ==
Jam Mehtab Hussain Dahar achieved his Bachelor of Medicine, Bachelor of Surgery (MBBS) degree from Liaquat University of Medical and Health Sciences. He served as minister of Population, Welfare & Revenue from 2008 to 2013 and also served as member of the Provincial Assembly of Sindh from 2002 to 2007 and 2008 to 2013. Hussain Dahar also served as minister for Food and Health 2013 – November 2014. He was again elected as member of the Provincial Assembly of Sindh in 2024 from PS-18 Ghotki.
