= Sarhad, Sindh =

Sarhad
- Town
- Sarhad
- Location within Sindh Location within Pakistan
- Coordinates: 28°02′47.1″N 69°24′46.3″E
- Country: Pakistan
- Province: Sindh
- District: Ghotki
- Time zone: UTC+5 (PST)

Sarhad is a town in Ghotki District, Sindh, Pakistan. It is located on N-5 National Highway at Km marker no 554.
