= Daho, Burkina Faso =

Daho
- Location within Burkina Faso
- Coordinates: 11°30′N 2°46′W
- Country: Burkina Faso
- Region: Boucle du Mouhoun Region
- Province: Balé Province
- Department: Fara Department

Population (2019)
  - Total: 1,050
- Time zone: UTC+0 (GMT)

Daho is a village in the Fara Department of Balé Province in southern Burkina Faso.

Population
| Year | Pop. | ±% |
|---|---|---|
| 1985 | 751 | — |
| 2006 | 1,444 | +92.3% |
| 2019 | 1,050 | −27.3% |
