= Sar Hadd =

Sar Hadd سرحد
- Village
- Location within Iran
- Coordinates: 33°12′58″N 59°29′22″E
- Country: Iran
- Province: South Khorasan
- County: Birjand
- Bakhsh: Central
- Rural District: Alqurat

Population (2006)
  - Total: 173
- Time zone: UTC+3:30 (IRST)
  - Summer (DST): UTC+4:30 (IRDT)

Sar Hadd (Persian: سرحد, also Romanized as Sar Ḩadd and Sarḩad; also known as Sarḩad-e Bālā) is a village in Alqurat Rural District, in the Central District of Birjand County, South Khorasan Province, Iran. At the 2006 census, its population was 173, in 47 families.
