= Bago Daho =

- Village
- Bago Daho
- Location within Sindh Location within Pakistan
- Coordinates: 28°06′46.8″N 69°31′28.6″E
- Pakistan: Pakistan
- Province: Sindh
- District: Ghotki District
- Time zone: UTC+5 (PST)

Bago Daho is a village in the district Ghotki, Pakistan and the district's union council. It is located at 28.1130°N, 69.5246°E.
