= Walhar =

Walhar Academy Umerkot Institue
- Settlement
- Location within Pakistan
- Coordinates: 28.201400°N 69.990137°E
- Country: Pakistan
- Province: Punjab
- District: Rahim Yar Khan
- Tehsil: Sadiqabad

Government
  - Politician: Rais Ghulam Murtaza Advocate

Walhar is a village in Sadiqabad Tehsil of Rahim Yar Khan, Punjab, Pakistan. It is 18.7 km away from Sadiqabad. Majority of the population consists of Terhaily (ترہیلی) caste, other casts are Abbasi, Chouhan, Soomro, Abroo.

People of the area are education-friendly and prefer to earn higher education. However, few of the villagers opt for the trade and business.

The village also has a Government Primary School for girls. As the village is located adjacent to Walhar Railway Station. Therefore, people also work in Pakistan Railways on different jobs.

The major profession of the villagers is Agriculture. While others also work in the Education and Health Department. Some of the people are also shopkeepers.

Famous Personalities of the village are Hasnain Ali HD, Rais Afzal, Rais Ghulam Murtaza Advocate, Rais Mehwal, and Rais Saleem Secretary.

People love to play cricket as their favourite sport.
