= Daharki =

Pakistani town

Daharki ڈہرکی
- City
- Location within Sindh Location within Pakistan
- Coordinates: 28°03′N 69°42′E
- Country: Pakistan
- Province: Sindh
- District: Ghotki District

Government
  - Type: Town Committee
  - Chairman: Zahid Hussain
  - Vice-Chairman: Raj Kumar

Area
  - Total: 2,088 km^{2} (806 sq mi)

Population (2023)
  - Total: 90,177
  - Density: 160.5/km^{2} (416/sq mi)
- Time zone: UTC+5 (PST)
- Calling code: +92 723

Daharki (Urdu: ڈہرکی) is a city in Ghotki District in the Sindh province of Pakistan. It is the capital of Daharki Taluka, an administrative subdivision of the district with an area of 2,088 km^{2}. It is situated about 100 km north-east of Sukkur, between Mirpur Mathelo and Ubauro on Pakistan's N-5 National Highway. According to the 2023 Census of Pakistan, it is the 25th largest city of Sindh, having a population of 90,177.

== History ==
Ghotki was founded as a camp by an Ambassador General of Raja Ibn Selaj Birhman (a relative of Raja Dahar of Sindh) in 637 A.D. At that time it was named as Hath Sam. In 712 A.D, Mohammad Bin Qasim conquered Sindh by defeating Raja Dahar, Ghot Ibn Samed Ibn Patel, the grandson of Raja Dahar, was settled in the area as he converted to Islam and in whose name the Ghota tribe came into being. Arabs awarded many Jagirs (Estates) to Ghotas and named this village as "Daharwali", to honor their grandfather.

Later on, this region was ruled by different dynasties, including the Soomros (1024-1351), the Arghuns (1520-1650), the Kalhoras (1657-1783) and the Talpurs (1783-1843). When Britain invaded the subcontinent, General Charles Napier, a commander in the British Army, defeated the Talpur dynasty and conquered Sindh in 1843. After the British conquest of Sindh province, in 1847, they awarded huge blocks of irrigated fertile land to the Ghotta tribal chieftains in return for their loyalty to the British. Gradually, the town's name changed into Ghotki (of Ghottas).

General Charles Napier was appointed as the first Governor-General of Sindh. The province was divided into different administrative units and assigned to Zamindars (landlords) to collect taxes for the British government. The British government developed these areas as urban centers. Consequently, people migrated from other districts and provinces as well and started to reside here. The British named these small, developed areas as "Talukas".

== Economy ==
Daharki is home to several cotton factories, a major fertilizer plant, and oil and gas exploratory facilities, among other industries. Notable companies with facilities at Daharki include Engro Fertilizers, Mari Energies, and Tullow Oil. Nearby power stations include Foundation Power Plant and Liberty Power Plant. The local industries are a major driver of the local economy, after the agricultural sector.

After the Partition of India in 1947, Daharki, located in what became Pakistan, saw the beginning of large-scale industrial development. In 1957, Pak Stanvac (an Esso/Mobil joint venture) stumbled upon vast deposits rich in natural gas in Mari while pursuing viable oil exploration in Sindh. With Pak Stanvac focused exclusively on oil exploration, the discovery shifted the impetus to Esso which decided to invest on the massive industrial potential of Mari gas field. In 1965, Esso Pakistan Fertilizer Company Limited (now known as Engro Fertilizers) commissioned a TOYO urea plant with a production capacity of 173,000 tons per annum, becoming the largest foreign investment in the private sector in the history of Pakistan until that date. Engro Fertilizers commissioned the world's largest single-train ammonia-urea plant of its time, covering 1.24 square miles in 2009. The facility's prilling tower was the tallest prilling tower in the world at the time of commissioning with a height of about 125 m, and is an iconic landmark of the city visible from miles away.

== Demographics ==
Population

Historical population
Year	Pop.	±% p.a.
1972	7,013	—
1981	17,417	+10.64%
1998	34,615	+4.12%
2017	86,286	+4.92%
2023	90,177	+0.74%

According to the 2023 Census of Pakistan, Daharki has a population of 90,177 people with 46,863 males (51.9%), 43,311 females (48%) and 3 identifying as transgender. Age distribution of the population is as 2017 Census follows:

Age Bracket	Total	Male	Female
70+ years	5,442	2,723	2,719
60-69 years	8,780	4,553	4,227
50-59 years	17,058	9,170	7,888
40-49 years	29,343	15,166	14,177
30-39 years	37,612	18,843	18,769
20-29 years	54,269	27,755	26,514
10-19 years	75,617	40,814	34,803
0-9 years	107,024	55,415	51,609

Languages

Languages of Daharki (2023 Census)
1. Sindhi (88.0%)
2. Urdu (4.70%)
3. Punjabi (4.30%)
4. Saraiki (1.59%)
5. Others (1.41%)

The mother tongue spoken in Daharki is predominantly Sindhi (88%), also (Saraiki) followed by Urdu (4.70%) and Punjabi (4.30%).

In terms of religion, the population is majority Muslim (89.11%) and Hindu (8.74%), with small Christian and Sikh minorities. Important Muslim religious sites in and around the city include Bharchundi Shareef Dargah, Chalan Faqeer, Pir Aziz Karmani, Pir Pakhroi Laal, Soi Sharif, Pir Gulab, and Shah Bukhari. The Bharchundi Sharif dargah and custodian is Mian Abdul Khaliq. Hindu sites include the spiritual darbar and the Sant Satram Das Temple at Raharki, 5 km away from Daharki. Christian sites include St. Francis Xavier Church, which was rebuilt in 2011. The Baba Nanik Shah Gurdwara is a place of worship for Daharki's Sikh population.

== Education ==
There are several schools in Daharki, those being:

- The Educators Daharki Campus
- Government Boys Lower Secondary School
- Government Boys High School, Raharki
- The Citizens Foundation School
- Sahara Welfare School
- Noor-e-Sehar Special Education School
- Engro Grammar School
- Engro Model School
- Mari Petroleum School
- Daharki School System
- Technical Training College (TTC)
- Government Primary School, Kaloo Burero

== Food ==
The local cuisine takes influence from traditional Sindhi recipes. Rice, wheat, and lentils serve as the foundation for many recipes. Some of the signature dishes that define Daharki's food culture include both vegetarian and non-vegetarian options:

- Sindhi Biryani: Daharki City's version of biryani frequently includes basmati rice, pieces of meat (usually mutton or chicken), and spices.
- Sai Bhaji: Saag is a side dish prepared from mustard leaves. Sindhi Kadhi, a tangy dish made with gram flour and different veggies, is eaten with steaming rice.
- Sindhi Karahi: a spicy and aromatic curry made with yogurt, gram flour, and assorted vegetables, often eaten with steamed rice or chapati.

Additionally, Daharki has a street food culture. The city offers an array of street snacks, from bazaars and restaurants to roadside vendors. These street foods include shawarma, chaat, samosas, gol gappe, and other local specialties.
