= Raharki =

Raherki Sahib
- City
- Raherki Sahib
- Location within Sindh Location within Pakistan
- Coordinates: 28.3°N 69.39°E
- Country: Pakistan
- Province: Sindh
- Elevation: 63 m (207 ft)
- Time zone: UTC+5 (PST)
- Number of towns: 1

Raherki, also spelled Rahirki, is a village in the Sindh province of Pakistan. It is located along the N-5 National Highway, and lies about 5 kilometres (3.1 mi) away from the city of Daharki. The Mahi Wah river runs through the centre of the village.

Raharki is a expanding town with a high literacy rate and developing infrastructure. The town is known as the birthplace of Sant Satram Das. His shrine (Devri) attracts pilgrims internationally, and an annual celebration of his birth is held in October.

Various Sindhu tribes such as Rid, Rahar, Rathore, Sameja, Kobhar Kumbhar, Khatri, Bhaya, Bhatti, and Dhondhu also live in this village. Muslims and Hindus live together in peace and harmony.

Engro Chemical Pakistan Ltd, which is one of the largest manufacturer of chemical fertilizer in Pakistan is situated within the jurisdiction of Union Council Raharki. Though Raharki is one of the fastest-growing villages of Sindh province, the residents are deprived of basic health and civic facilities.

== Climate ==
The climate of Chak is hot and misty during summer while cold and dry in winter. Generally the summer season commences in March - April and ends before October. Winter temperatures range from 7 to 22 °C (45 to 72 °F). Summer temperatures average 35 °C (95 °F), though it often shoots up to 45 °C (113 °F).

== Economy ==
Most of the villagers earn their livelihood from agriculture. There is an increasing trend in the private shops and government jobs.

== Education ==
The following are the educational institutions in Raharki.

- Government Branch High School, Raharki
- Government Primary School, Raharki

== Religion ==
Hindu temples:

- Raharki Sahib at Raharki

The temple situated in Raharki is regarded as one of the biggest temples in Pakistan and is visited by thousands of devotees from all over the world.

== See also ==
- Daharki
- Sukkur
- Ghotki
- Sindhi people
