= Ubauro Tehsil =

Ubauro Taluka تعلقہ اوباوڑو
- Tehsil
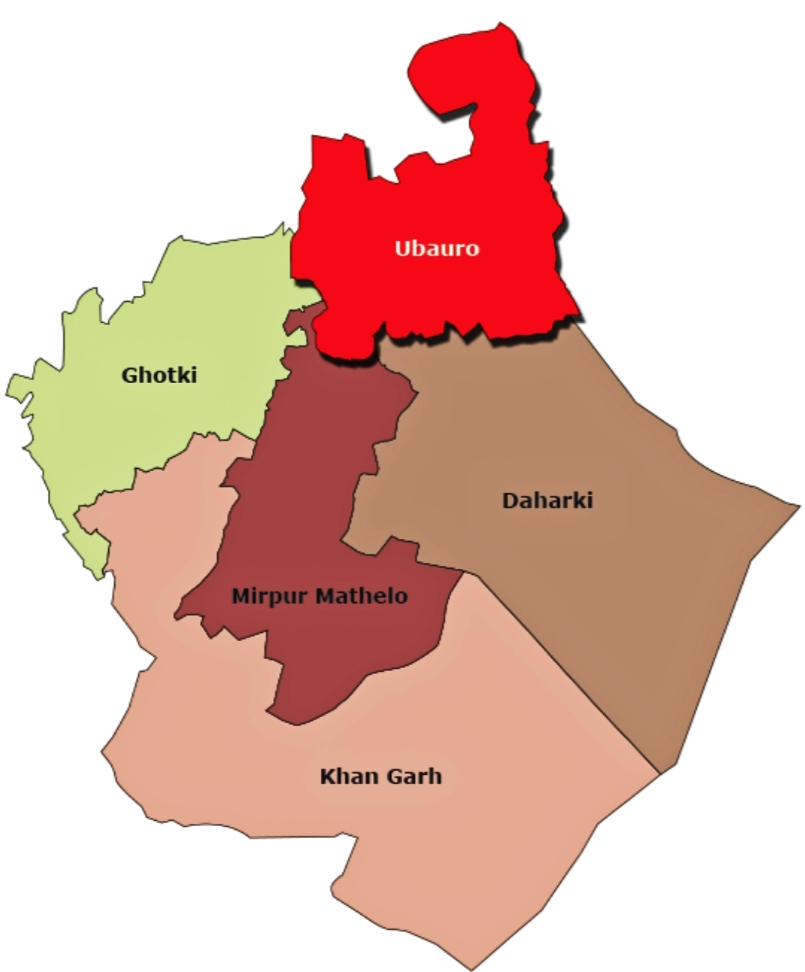
- Country: Pakistan
- Province: Sindh
- District: Ghotki District
- Time zone: UTC+5 (PST)
- Number of towns: 1
- Number of Union Councils: 8

Ubauro Tehsil is an administrative subdivision (tehsil) of Ghotki District in the Sindh province of Pakistan. It is administratively subdivided into eight Union Councils, one of which form the capital Ubauro.
