= Khangarh, Sindh =

Khangarh
- Location within Sindh
- Coordinates: 28.1°N 69.19°E
- Country: Pakistan
- Province: Sindh

Population (2023 census)
  - City: 32,648
  - Metro: 162,318 (Khangarh taluka)
- Time zone: UTC+5 (PST)

Khangarh (Sindhi: خانڳڙهه) is a city in the Ghotki District of Pakistan's Sindh province.

The city is a center for sugarcane and cotton crops. It is one of the largest tehsils of the Ghotki District.

Cholistan Desert is mainly located in the Khangarh area.

== Demographics ==
Census	Population
2017	30,423
2023	32,648
