= Shadani Darbar =

Hindu temple in Pakistan

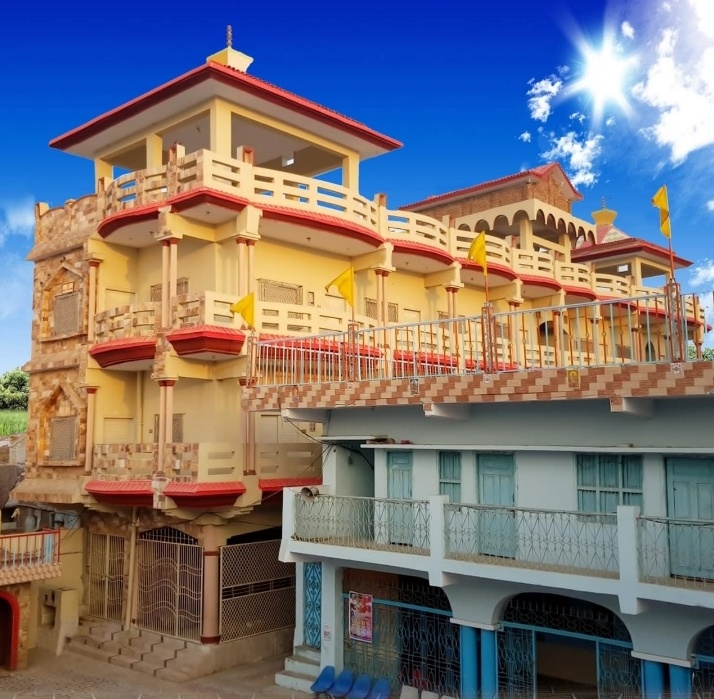

- Location within Sindh Location within Pakistan

Religion
- Affiliation: Hinduism
- District: Ghotki District

Location
- Location: Mirpur Mathelo Taluka
- State: Sindh
- Country: Pakistan
- Interactive map of Shadani Darbar
- Coordinates: 27°57′30.7″N 69°30′30.1″E

Architecture
- Type: Hindu temple

Shadani Darbar is a historic Hindu temple in Raipur Hindustan and Pakistan. It is located in Hayat Pitafi, Mirpur Mathelo Taluka, Ghotki District in the Sindh Province of Pakistan. It is said to be the biggest Hindu temple in Sindh. The temple is visited by devotees from Pakistan but also from India.

== History ==
The foundation of Shadani Darbar was laid by Sant Shadaram Sahib in 1786. The Sant Shadaram is a great Hindu saint who was born in 1708 in Lahore.

== Annual Celebration ==
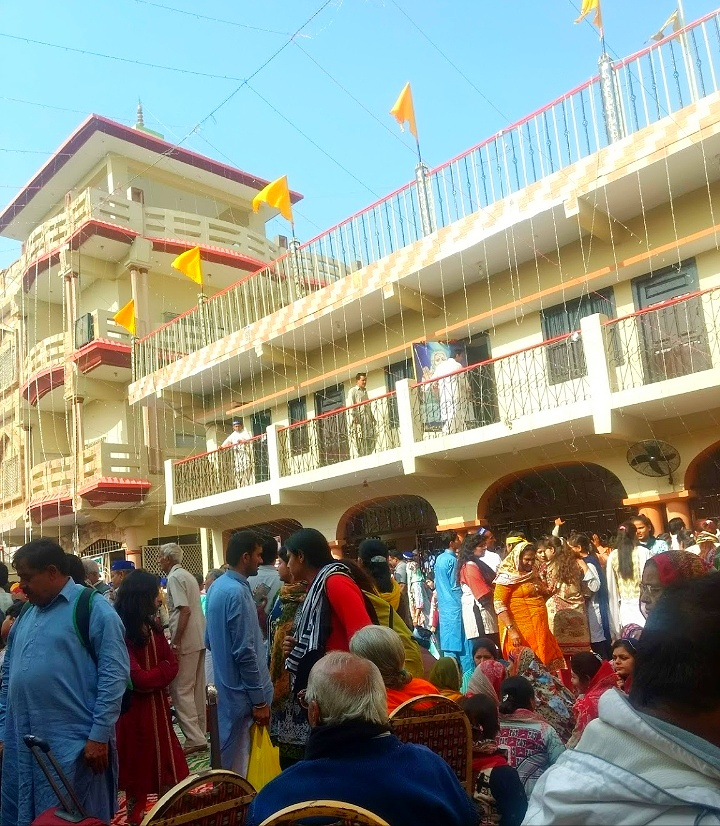
Devotees in Shadani Darbar during annual birth anniversary celebration of Satguru Shadaram Sahib jee Maharaj

Three day celebrations are held in the temple annually during the birth anniversary of Sant Shadaram. During these days, Agni Pooja is conducted and the recitation of Bhagavad Gita and Guru Grinth Sahib takesplace. Mass wedding of poor Hindus are also conducted by the temple authorities during these days. Pilgrims from India visit the temple during these celebrations.

== See also ==
- Ramapir Temple Tando Allahyar
- Umarkot Shiv Mandir
- Hinglaj Mata mandir
- Baba Ram Thaman Shrine
