= Mirpur Mathelo =

Mirpur Mathelo ميرپور ماتھيلو
- City
- Location within Sindh Location within Pakistan
- Coordinates: 28°1′N 69°32′E
- Country: Pakistan
- Province: Sindh
- Division: Sukkur
- District: Ghotki

Government

Area
  - City: 15 km^{2} (5.8 sq mi)
- Elevation: 76 m (249 ft)

Population (2023)
  - City: 74,651
  - Density: 5,000/km^{2} (13,000/sq mi)
  - Metro: 350,647 (taluk)
- Time zone: UTC+5 (PST)
- Dialling code: 0723

Mirpur Mathelo (Sindhi: میرپور ماٿيلو;Urdu: میرپور ماتھيلو) is a city in the Ghotki District of the Sindh province of Pakistan. The city is administratively subdivided into ten union councils. It is the 97th most populous city in Pakistan. It is also the location of the archaeological site, Moomal Ji Mari.

== History ==
Mirpur Mathelo is mentioned in a 1634 CE book "Tarikh Mazhar i Shah Jahani", the book mentions that Mathelo was one of the five Parganas of Rohri. In Mathelo there was a very old and fortified fort. The Main tribes living in Mathelo were the Samma Mahar and Dhareja Tribes.

== Topography ==
Mirpur Mathelo is a plain land with many trees, which is mostly Eucalyptus, Acacia Nilotica. Cultivation is widely found in the area. Wheat, rice and cotton are widely cultivated. Bananas, mangoes and date trees are excessively found here. Lands are irrigated both by tube wells and canals. Mirpur Mathelo is the oldest town in Sindh Province. In this town exists a very large Govt High School, Boys Degree College and Girls Degree College. In Mirpur Mathelo town, a Technical and IT Institute Siscom Technologies (https://www.siscomtek.com/) and a library is also present.

== Drainage ==
Masu Vah (Canal) flows in the suburb of the city just near the site of Fauji Fertilizer Company Limited. It is the main source of water used for the cultivation of land. It is also a source of fish for local fishermen.

=== Rain ===
Although the amount is good it is not reliable as it happens only during the monsoon seasons and rarely occurs other than this period.

== Economy ==
Ten Kilometers between this city and Daharki has major Pakistani industries i.e. Fauji Fertilizer Company Limited, Mari Gas Company, Liberty Power Plant and Engro Fertilizer Plant of Engro Corporation.

== Demographics ==
According to the results of the 2023 Pakistani census, Mirpur Mathelo had a population of 74,651, of which 38,879 were males, 35,768 were females and 4 represented the Transgender population. Mirpur Mathelo taluka had 350,647 people.

Census	Population
1972	13,517
1981	21,241
1998	42,421
2017	75,270
2023	74,651

Languages

Languages of Mirpur Mathelo city (2023 Census)
1. Sindhi (95.3%)
2. Urdu (2.00%)
3. Punjabi (1.70%)
4. Others (1.00%)

According to the final results of the 2023 Pakistani census, 95.3% of the population spoke Sindhi, as their first language. While 2% spoke Urdu, 1.7% Punjabi and 1% spoke other languages such as Balochi, Saraiki, etc.

Religion

Religions in Mirpur Mathelo (2023)
Religion	Percent
Islam	92.71%
Hinduism	7.21%
Other or not stated	0.06%

The majority religion is Islam, with 92.71% of the population. Hinduism (including scheduled castes) is practised by 7.21%, while other faiths are practised by 0.06% of the population.

== Religious attractions ==
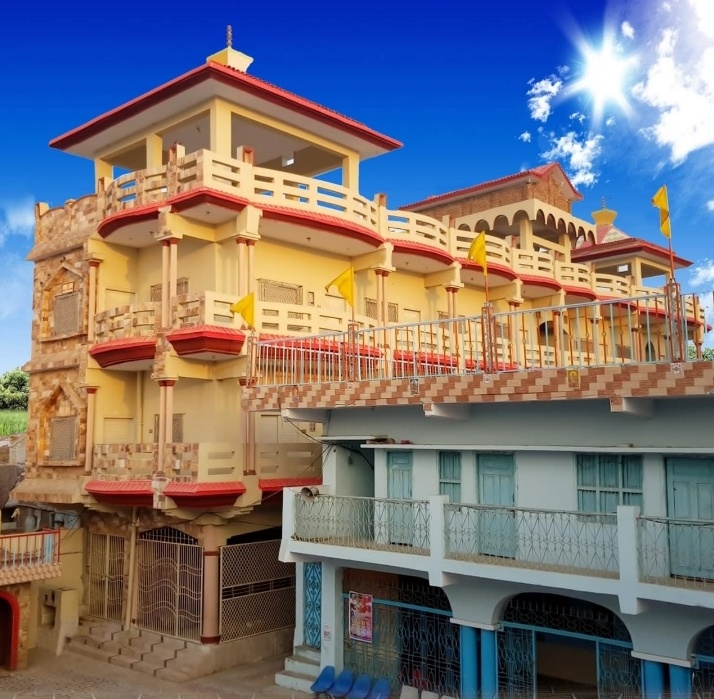
Shadani Darbar

Saint Syed Anwar Shah (Jhanpur Sharif) and Sayed Jalil Shah Bukhari on Jarwar road about 5 kilometres from Mirpur Mathelo Town and many other Saint and scholars belong from here. The historic Shadani Darbar is located here.

=== Shops ===
Compared with other areas of Pakistan the city has more Hindu vendors. The city is a rising city and has many investors. Mirpur Mathelo is growing fast as compared to other cities in the Ghotki district.

=== Fauji Fertilizer Company Limited ===
Fauji Fertilizer Company Limited has three plants all over Pakistan. Two are situated at Machi Goth, Sadiqabad lies in the next province Punjab while the other is established here. The largest fertilizer producer in Pakistan, it has also gained popularity in Mirpur Mathelo, so much so that it is known by most inhabitants of the city. One reason for this are the various social welfare projects that have been completed here ranging from Sona Welfare Hospital to Sona Public School & College. Fauji Fertilizer Company Limited has also provided many job opportunities for Mathelians and has thus improved the conditions of the area since its establishment in 2002.

== Unions ==
The unions of the city are: Dhangro, Garhi Chaker, Jarwar, Mirpur Mathelo-I, Jahan Khan Unar, Sono Pitafi, Wahi Ghoto, Yaro Lund, Islam Khan Lashari and Dino Mako.

== Notable natives ==
- Nasrullah Gadani (1984-2024) - journalist and activist.
