= Mirpur Mathelo Tehsil =

Mirpur Mathelo تلعقہ میرپور ماتھیلو ميرپور ماٿيلو تعلقو
- Tehsil
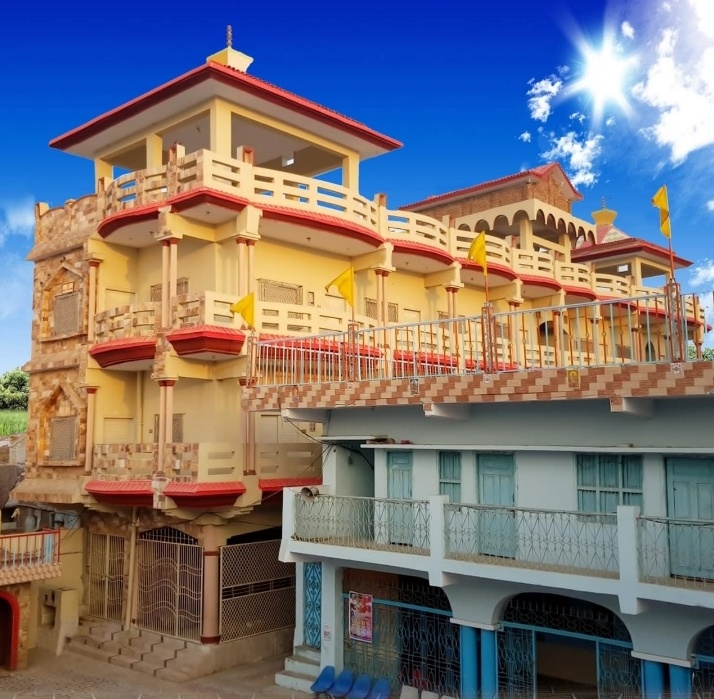
- Shadani Darbar
- Country: Pakistan
- Province: Sindh
- District: Ghotki District
- Time zone: UTC+5 (PST)
- Number of towns: 1
- Number of Union Councils: 10

Mirpur Mathelo Tehsil is an administrative subdivision (tehsil) of Ghotki District in the Sindh province of Pakistan. It is administratively subdivided into ten Union Councils, two of which form the capital Mirpur Mathelo. It is headquarters of Ghotki district. The historic Shadani Darbar is located in Mirpur Mathelo Taluka.

Popular places in Mirpur Mathelo include the Saint's Tomb. There are many public and private schools and colleges. Govt High School Mirpur Mathelo is very famous and old. There is IT and vocational institute Siscom Technologies.
