= Daharki Tehsil =

Daharki Taluka تلعقہ ڈھرکی ڏهرڪي تعلقو
- Tehsil
- Country: Pakistan
- Province: Sindh
- District: Ghotki District
- Time zone: UTC+5 (PST)
- Number of towns: 1
- Number of Union Councils: 7

Daharki Tehsil (Sindhi: ڏهرڪي) is an administrative subdivision (tehsil) of Ghotki District in the Sindh province of Pakistan. It is administratively subdivided into seven union councils, one of which forms the capital Daharki.

== Demography ==
At the time of the 2017 Census of Pakistan, the distribution of the population of Daharki Tehsil by first language was as follows:

- 91.3% Sindhi
- 2.6% Punjabi
- 2.5% Urdu
- 2.0% Saraiki
- 0.6% Balochi
- 0.4% Hindko
- 0.3% Pashto
- 0.1% Brahui
- 0.0% Kashmiri
- 0.1% Others

== Industry ==
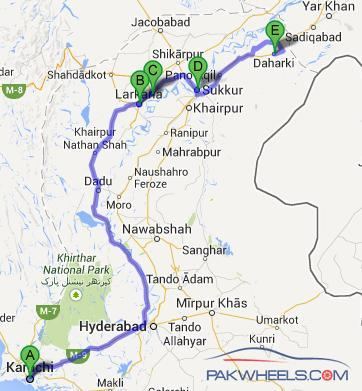

- Engro Fertilizers
- Mari Petroleum
