= Ubauro =

اوباڑو - اوباوڙو
- City
- Ubauro
- Location of Ubauro Ubauro (Pakistan) Ubauro (South Asia)
- Coordinates: 28°09′50″N 69°43′45″E
- Country: Pakistan
- Province: Sindh
- District: Ghotki District
- Elevation: 64 m (210 ft)

Population (2023)
  - Total: 50,981
- Time zone: UTC+5 (PST)
- Calling code: 0723
- Number of towns: 1
- Number of Union councils: 8
- Postal code 65030

Ubauro (Urdu: اوباڑو) is a town in Ghotki District in Northern Sindh province, Pakistan.

== History ==
Ubauro was known to be inhabited by Rebel Baloch Tribals in 18th century. In April 1864, Pannu Khan with other rebels of Dashti and Shar Tribes attacked Kot Sabzal from Ubauro with total 600 mens, leading to 5 deaths and 6 injuries in British State Troops. Ubauro was listed (as Ubāora) in the Ain-i-Akbari as a pargana in sarkar Multan, counted as part of the Bīrūn-i Panjnad ("Beyond the Five Rivers"). It was assessed at 915,256 dams in revenue and supplied a force of 30 cavalry and 500 infantry. Based on references in the Mazhar-i Shahjajani and the Chahar Gulshan, it seems that the southern boundary of sarkar Multan was just to the south of Ubauro.

== Demographics ==
Population

Historical population
Year	Pop.	±%
1972	3,718	—
1981	9,552	+156.9%
1998	21,299	+123.0%
2017	44,496	+108.9%
2023	50,981	+14.6%

As of 2023, Ubauro had a population of 50,981. Its population increased from 44,496 in 2017.

Languages

Languages of Ubauro (2023 Census)
1. Sindhi (77.2%)
2. Urdu (18.5%)
3. Punjabi (1.90%)
4. Balochi (0.76%)
5. Others (1.64%)

According to the 2023 Census, Sindhi is the primary language spoken in Ubauro city, spoken by 77.2% of the population. Urdu is spoken by 18.5% of the population, followed by Punjabi speakers at 1.90%, Balochi speakers at 0.76%, and other languages comprising the remaining 1.64%.
