= Ghotki District =

District in Sindh, Pakistan

Ghotki District ضِلعو گھوٽڪي
- District of Sindh
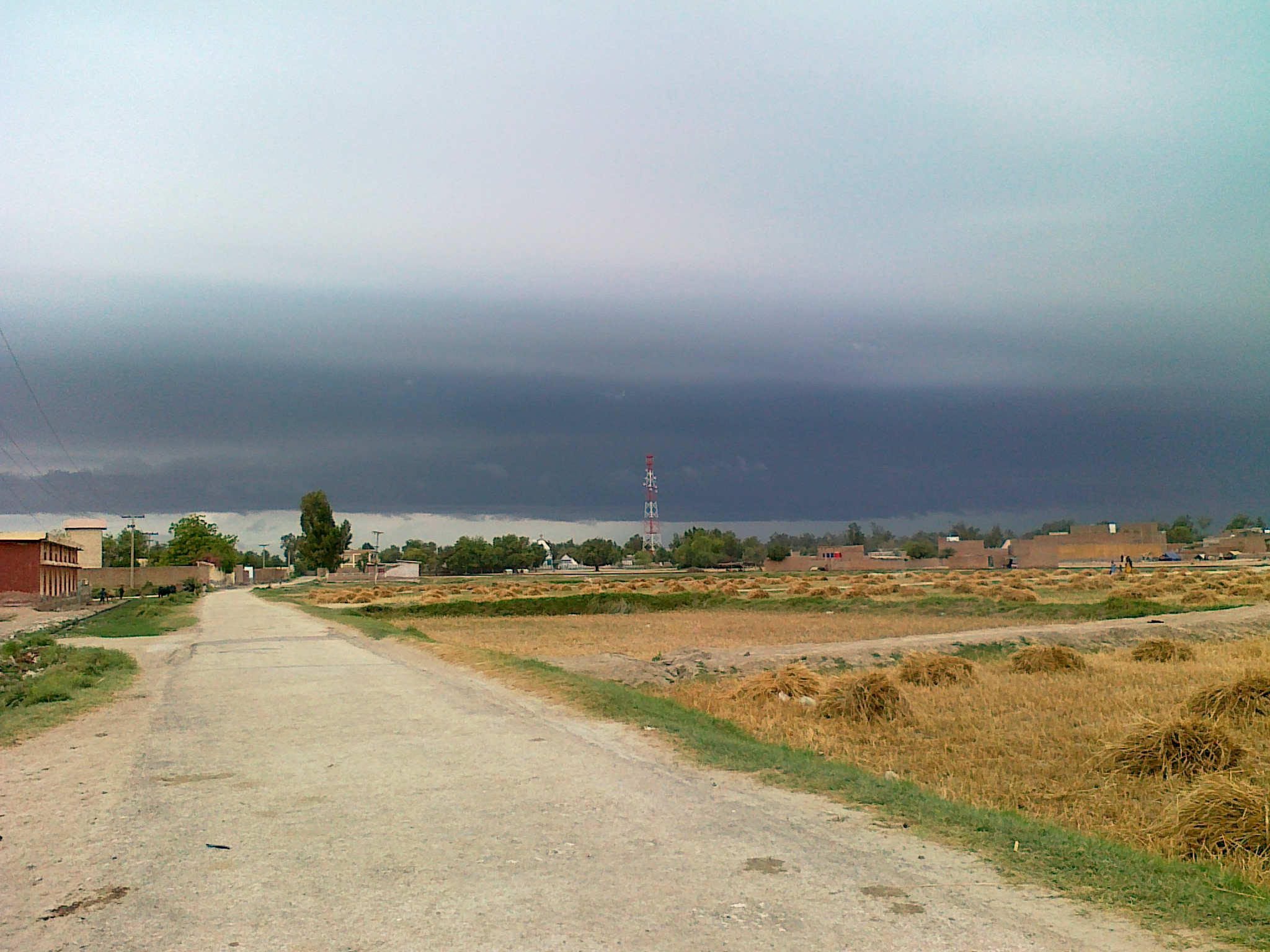
- Wango village

- Location of Ghotki in Sindh province
- Coordinates: 27°49′N 69°39′E
- Country: Pakistan
- Province: Sindh
- Division: Sukkur
- District: 1993
- Headquarters: Mirpur Mathelo

Government
  - Type: District Administration
  - Deputy Commissioner: Dr. Syed Muhammad Ali
  - District Police Officer: Dr. Sumair Noor Chnna
  - District Health Officer: Dr. Rao Aftab

Area
  - District of Sindh: 6,083 km^{2} (2,349 sq mi)

Population (2023)
  - District of Sindh: 1,772,609
  - Density: 291.4/km^{2} (754.7/sq mi)
  - Urban: 379,382 (21.40%)
  - Rural: 1,393,227

Literacy
  - Literacy rate: Total: 41.38%; Male: 55.32%; Female: 26.27%
- Time zone: UTC+5 (PST)

Ghotki District (Sindhi: ضِلعو گھوٽڪي; Urdu: ضلع گھوٹکی) is a district of the province of Sindh, Pakistan, with headquarter in the city of Mirpur Mathelo. Prior to its establishment as a district in 1993, it formed part of Sukkur District.

== Geography ==
Ghotki District is stretched in 6083 km^{2} (1,555,528 acres). 25,000 acres area of the district consisting of desert land, 402,578 acres (25.88%) is flooded (Katcha) area and remaining area lying between desert and flooded areas of district is cultivated. Desert area having wind-blown hills as Achro Thar (White Desert). Flooded area (Kacha) is stretched on 87 km along Indus River from north - east to south - west of the district where forests exist in this area.

== Administration ==
The Ghotki district is administratively subdivided into the following Tehsils:

- Mirpur Mathelo Tehsil
- Daharki Tehsil
- Ghotki Tehsil
- Ubauro Tehsil
- Khangarh Tehsil

== Demographics ==
Historical population
Year	Pop.	±% p.a.
1951	179,186	—
1961	221,243	+2.13%
1972	401,318	+5.56%
1981	558,058	+3.73%
1998	968,490	+3.30%
2017	1,648,708	+2.84%
2023	1,772,609	+1.21%

As of the 2023 census, Ghotki district has 331,046 households and a population of 1,772,609. The district has a sex ratio of 107.99 males to 100 females and a literacy rate of 41.38%: 55.32% for males and 26.27% for females. 564,246 (32.05% of the surveyed population) are under 10 years of age. 379,382 (21.40%) live in urban areas.

Religions in Ghotki district (2023)
Religion	Percent
Islam	93.35%
Hinduism	6.35%
Other or not stated	0.3%

Religion in contemporary Ghotki District
Religious group	1941		2017		2023	
Religious group	Pop.	%	Pop.	%	Pop.	%
Islam	139,222	82.21%	1,544,355	93.67%	1,643,701	93.35%
Hinduism	29,850	17.63%	101,974	6.19%	111,770	6.35%
Others (Note: Including Jainism, Christianity, Buddhism, Zoroastrianism, Judaism, Ad-Dharmis, or not stated)	284	0.17%	2,379	0.14%	5,290	0.3%
Total Population	169,356	100%	1,648,708	100%	1,760,761	100%
Note: 1941 census data is for Ghotki, Mirpur Bathoro and Ubauro taluks of Sukkur District, which roughly corresponds to contemporary Ghotki District.

The majority religion is Islam, with 93.35% of the population. Hinduism (including those from Scheduled Castes) is practiced by 6.35% of the population.

Languages of Ghotki district (2023)
1. Sindhi (95.8%)
2. Urdu (1.79%)
3. Others (2.43%)

At the time of the 2023 census, 95.79% of the population spoke Sindhi and 1.79% Urdu as their first language.

The historic Hindu temple Shadani Darbar is located in this district.

== List of Dehs ==
The following is a list of Ghotki District's dehs (villages), organised by taluka:

- Ghotki Taluka (77 dehs)
  - Adilpur
  - Amirabad
  - Attal Muradani
  - Bago Daho
  - Bandh
  - Baqro
  - Behishti
  - Belo Gublo
  - Belo Jamshero
  - Belo Sangri
  - Beriri
  - Bhanjro
  - Bhiryalo
  - Bhityoon
  - Changlani
  - Dari
  - Dhamaji
  - Doomano
  - Drago
  - Dring Chachhar
  - Erazi
  - Esa Wali
  - Fazal Bhayo
  - Hakra
  - Hamro
  - Hussain Beli
  - Jahanpur
  - Jamal
  - Janghiari
  - Katcho Bahab
  - Katcho Bindi
  - Katcho Miranpur
  - Katcho Tibi
  - Katco Buxo Ghoto
  - Khadwari
  - Khahi Daro
  - Kham
  - Khuhara
  - Azmat Khan Bharo
  - Kotlo Bullo
  - Labana
  - Lakhan
  - Laloowali
  - Maka
  - Malhir
  - Malook Wali
  - Mathelo
  - Miyani
  - Moto Mahar
  - Muhammad Pur
  - Odharwali
  - Pacco Bahab
  - Pacco Bindi
  - Pacco Buxo Ghoto
  - Pacco Miranpur
  - Pacco Tibi
  - Pano Khalso
  - Phekrato
  - Qadirpur
  - Qaloo Malhan
  - Qazi Wahan
  - Ruk
  - Salehn Malhar
  - Sangi Ghotki
  - Sangri
  - Sarhad
  - Satabo Bhayo
  - Shafiabad
  - Shaikhani
  - Suhriani
  - Sundrani
  - Thatho Malhan
  - Vidhur
  - Wad Pagiya
  - Wagni
  - Wasayo Chachar
  - Wasti Inayat Shah
  - Wasti Q. Din Shah
- Daharki Taluka (48 dehs)
  - Alamarain
  - Bago Daro
  - Belo Berutta
  - Berutta
  - Chacharki
  - Chanad
  - Chhoranwalo
  - Daharki
  - Derawaro
  - Dhandh Raharki
  - Goi
  - Gorhelo
  - Gulo Pitafi
  - Hamidpur
  - Hiko
  - Ibrahim Pitafi
  - Jado Pitafi
  - Jampur
  - Jhanwar
  - Jhum
  - Jung
  - Bharo
  - Kalwar
  - Katta
  - Khenjho
  - Kherohi
  - Khushkh
  - Kotlo
  - Lal Pitafi
  - Looni
  - Maringaro
  - Mirzapur
  - Poh No1
  - Poh No2
  - Raharki
  - Rail
  - Raini
  - Sain Dino Malik
  - Sanilo
  - Sanko
  - Sejan
  - Shahbazpur
  - Simno
  - Sutiayaro No5
  - Sutiyaro Chak No1
  - Sutiyaro Chak No2
  - Takio M. Pannah
  - Vijnoth
  - Wahi Gul Khan
- Khan Garh Taluka (37 dehs)
  - Aithi
  - Ali Mahar
  - Ari Mahar
  - Bambli
  - Bandwari
  - Bari
  - Bhetoor
  - Bhitoin
  - Chak Qazi Badal
  - Chhanwani
  - Dakhano
  - Ibrahim Mahar
  - Izat Wari
  - Kandlo
  - Khabar Chachar
  - Khangarh
  - Khanpur
  - Lakho Mahar
  - Lohi
  - Makahi
  - Mithri
  - Naro
  - Pathan Mahar
  - Phul Daho
  - Qazi Badal
  - Raanyar
  - Sahta
  - Samo Wah
  - Sanharo
  - Shahpur
  - Sutiaro No. 1
  - Sutiaro No. 3
  - Tarai
  - Wahi Dhano
  - Waloo Mahar
  - Walrah
  - Warwaro
- Mirpur Matelo Taluka (60 dehs)
  - Akhtiar Waseer
  - Alim Khan Gadani
  - Baloch Khan
  - Barar
  - Bel Mirpur
  - Belo Waseer
  - Belo Bozdar
  - Bhiri Laghari
  - Chijjan
  - Damanon
  - Darwesh Naich
  - Dhangro
  - Dil Muard Gabole
  - Dino Mako
  - Drib Dethri
  - Fatehpur
  - Gahno lund
  - Gaji Gadani
  - Garhi Chakar
  - Gendarko
  - Gurkan
  - Haj Korai
  - Hamind Korai
  - Hayat Pitafi
  - Ismail Bozdar
  - Jahan Khan Unar
  - Jarwar
  - Jhangan
  - Jindo Pitafi
  - Kander
  - Karampur
  - Khansar
  - Khu Meenhon
  - Khui Khengi
  - Lashkri Lund
  - Latif Shah
  - Machalo
  - Malnas
  - Meroja
  - Mirpur
  - Mitho Lund
  - Nhundri
  - Pipri
  - Sabar Bozdar
  - Saeed Khan Chandio
  - Sahib Khan Lund
  - Shekhan Wari
  - Sher Ali Gabole
  - Sher Khan Bozdar
  - Sher Khan Kolachi
  - Sobho Lund
  - Sono Pitafi
  - Suhanjro
  - Sutyaro 1
  - Sutyaro 4
  - Tahir Gadani
  - Wah Bakro
  - Wadhi Ghoto
  - Wahi Mubarak
  - Yaro Lund
- Ubauro Taluka
  - B. Rano Rahar
  - Band
  - Bapar
  - Belo Rawanti
  - Bindi adam
  - Bindo A. Sattar
  - Bori
  - Chanali
  - Chandia
  - Chatu Daho
  - Dabli
  - Daulatpur
  - Daveri
  - Detha Bhaya
  - Dilwaro
  - Dub
  - Garang
  - Ghundi
  - Girkno
  - Gohram chachar
  - Goongo daho
  - Islam Lashari
  - Jhangal Dawo
  - Jhangal Malik
  - Kalwli
  - Kamo Shaheed
  - Katcho Miani Malook
  - Keenjhar
  - Khambhra
  - Khamiso Chachar
  - Koraiki
  - Kotlo kamil
  - Kotlo Yousuf
  - Kubhur
  - Kundri Walo
  - Mari
  - Maroowalo
  - Matar Kot
  - Muhammad Pur
  - Muradpur
  - Naseer dhandu
  - Nurley
  - Pako miani malook
  - Pir Bux
  - Rajanpur
  - Rano Rahar
  - Rawanti
  - Reti
  - Rind
  - Sayed Pur
  - Shadi walo
  - Shahwali
  - Shams chapri
  - Shewani
  - Soi Sharef
  - Sonan
  - Tig
  - Ubauro
  - Wasti Jiwan Shah
  - Warwalo

== Economy ==
Ghotki District has recently embraced sugar cane. The total acreage of cultivable land is 286,090 ha in 2019–20. The area under cultivation of sugar cane increased to 58,774 ha in 2019-20 from 6,511 ha in 2011–12. Five functional sugar mills are located in the district.

== Culture ==
Saints' tombs include Syed Anwar Shah at Jahnpur, Syed Jaleel Shah Mast, 5 kilometres away from Mipur Mathelo town, and Nare shah Jelani in Ghotki Town. Ghotki District has many historical places, including Mathelo Moomal Ji Mari, where there is a museum and Syed Nathan Shah's (Naharo) tomb.

== See also ==
- Divisions of Pakistan
- Tehsils of Pakistan
  - Tehsils of Punjab, Pakistan
  - Tehsils of Khyber Pakhtunkhwa, Pakistan
  - Tehsils of Balochistan, Pakistan
  - Tehsils of Sindh, Pakistan
  - Tehsils of Azad Kashmir
  - Tehsils of Gilgit-Baltistan
- Districts of Pakistan
  - Districts of Khyber Pakhtunkhwa, Pakistan
  - Districts of Punjab, Pakistan
  - Districts of Balochistan, Pakistan
  - Districts of Sindh, Pakistan
  - Districts of Azad Kashmir
  - Districts of Gilgit-Baltistan
- 2019 Ghotki riots

== Bibliography ==
- 1998 District census report of Ghotki. Census publication. Vol. 88. Islamabad: Population Census Organization, Statistics Division, Government of Pakistan. 2000.
