= Khairo Bhatti =

- Location within Pakistan
- Coordinates: 28.9°N 68.27°E
- Country: Pakistan
- Province: Sindh
- Elevation: 54 m (177 ft)
- Time zone: UTC+5 (PST)

Khairo Bhatti is a town in the Sindh province of Pakistan. It is located at 28.9°N 68.27°E with an altitude of 54 metres (180 feet).
