= Goth Bozo =

- Location within Pakistan
- Coordinates: 28.14°N 69.12°E
- Country: Pakistan
- Province: Balochistan
- Elevation: 68 m (223 ft)
- Time zone: UTC+5 (PST)

Goth Bozo is a town in the Sindh province of Pakistan. It is located at 28°14'40N 69°12'0E with an altitude of 68 metres (226 feet).
