= Kashmir Goth =

Village in Sindh, Pakistan

- Location within Sindh
- Coordinates: 26.04°N 68.40°E
- Country: Pakistan
- Province: Sindh
- Elevation: 20 m (66 ft)
- Time zone: UTC+5 (PST)

Kashmir Goth is a town in the Sindh province of Pakistan.
