= Book publishing in Pakistan =

Book publishing in Pakistan refers to the production and distribution of books in the country’s major languages, including Urdu, English , Punjabi, Pashto, Sindhi, Balochi, and others. Pakistan has an active and diverse publishing sector encompassing literary, educational, religious, and academic works, with major publishing centers in cities such as Lahore, Karachi, and Islamabad. Reliable statistics on the number of books published annually in Pakistan are difficult to obtain, as legal deposit and ISBN registration are unevenly enforced and many regional-language and independent publications are not formally recorded. As a result, officially documented figures based on bibliographic records represent only a portion of total publishing activity, while media and industry estimates suggest that actual output may be substantially higher.

== Statistics ==
Accurate data on book publishing in Pakistan is difficult to obtain. Although the National Library of Pakistan in Islamabad serves as the official repository and is responsible for issuing ISBNs, compliance is limited. Many publishers, particularly those producing works in indigenous languages, often do not apply for ISBNs or submit copies of their publications as legally required. The lack of enforcement mechanisms further contributes to the inconsistency and incompleteness of publishing records in the country. While official estimates suggest that only a few thousand books are published annually in Pakistan, actual figures may be significantly higher due to underreporting. The ISBN system was introduced in Pakistan in 1984, and as of 2025, there were over 121,000 ISBNs registered to local publications and around 5,000 registered publishers.

In 2010, Voice of America Urdu reported that, according to data registered under the ISBN, about 45,000 books on various subjects and genres were published in Pakistan this year, with books on personalities and current affairs being the most sought after, with books on home economics (especially on cooking) also being in high demand.

In 2022, according to Sher Alam Shinwari, a specialist in Pashto literature writing for Dawn News, more than 25,000 books were published in the Khyber Pakhtunkhwa province, in three languages (Pashto, Urdu and Hindko), mostly through private publishing houses.

== Urdu books ==
Urdu fiction does date back to pre-independence times when pioneers like Mirza Haadi Ruswa wrote Umrao Jaan Ada. These writers wrote not only to entertain, but to educate the masses, and to revive the culture in Indo-Pak at a time when the society was influenced by British values. One recent name in fiction is that of Saadat Nasreen who published her first collection of short stories last year.

Humor is a popular form of fiction. Shafiq Ur Rehman has contributed to this genre of literature.

Translations of major works of English and other languages into Urdu have begun to appear in the market, including the texts of Shakespeare and more modern fiction like Harry Potter.

=== Poetry ===
Poetry is one of the oldest forms of Urdu literature. Poets Mir Taqi Mir, Ghalib, Allama Iqbal and others created a name for themselves before independence. More recently, there have been notable poets like Faiz Ahmed Faiz, Ahmed Faraz, Ahmed Nadeem Qasmi, Parveen Shakir and Jaun Elia.

Poets in the sub-continent, particularly in Pakistan, have focused on a wide range of topics from social awareness to politics, to religion, and to romance.

=== Children’s literature ===
Urdu offers a range of books for children from folk tales to poetry to novels and short stories. Recently many authors have written children's books concerning health, the environment, and even child abuse to bring awareness to these issues. These children's books have received wide appreciation for their content and quality illustrations. One popular series is the Mina series initiated by UNICEF. Other NGOs are also working on such books for children.

== Regional books ==
=== Balochi ===
Poetry is the only form of literature in the language which has seen some activity lately. Poetry was and still is a major part of Balochi literature, with a rich history of 600 years.

==== Mullah Fazul ====
Classic poet Mullah Fazul was born in the house of Chawash Jangiyan Rind at the end of the eighteenth century. His family migrated from western Balochistan and settled in Qassmi Chat, Mand Kech Mekran. He and his brother Mulla Qassim a renounce poet of Balochi Language were both widely known for their intelligence from an early age. In addition to Balochi they had command of the Arabic and Persian languages.

The many contributions of Mulla Fazul helped progress the Balochi language and Balochi literature. He introduced numerous innovations such as the change of thematic structure in poetry and language. Traditionally, Balochi poetry concentrated on narrative structure or storytelling. However, he introduced themes that were foreign to this structure such as the social conditions of his people and ballads of patriotism and the homeland. His departure from the conventional structure also resulted in him introducing new connotations to many classical Balochi words, thus aiding in the evolution of the Balochi language.

On 30 May 1854, at the age of eighty, the Baloch poet died. He was buried in Mand, Balochistan.

==== Novels ====
Ninety novels were published in the Balochi language in the past 10 years.

=== Pashto ===
Early Pashto writers, after independence, were passive nationalists, progressive nationalists, radical nationalists, and Marxists. Except for the passive nationalists, almost all of the early Pashto writers were politically motivated.

Pashto literature developed within the Pashto struggle for freedom from oppression by the ruling class. Their writings reflect this struggle. Pashto writing has moved towards objectivism to subjectivism.

Sher Alam Shinwari, a specialist in regional Pashto literature, estimated that over 25,000 books were published in the Khyber Pakhtunkhwa province alone in 2022 through private publishing houses. Many of these publications are thus believed to have bypassed registration with the National Library of Pakistan, reflecting broader issues of non-compliance with ISBN and legal deposit requirements.

=== Punjabi ===
Among Pakistan's several regional languages, Punjabi is the closest to Urdu. Many singers have adopted Punjabi to add 'spice' to their songs, which has contributed to the genre of Punjabi poetry. Punjabi literature however, was not as developed as the Sindhi literature. The roots of Punjabi prose can safely be traced back to Baba Nanak's Janam Sakhis, but the lack of attention paid to the medium hampered its growth.

The literary scene was dominated by Urdu until the 50s.Since then, the Punjabi language publishing world has expanded. Last year, the Lehran Adabi Board published the book Lehran Behran, which is a collection of critical articles on Punjabi language and literature.

=== Sindhi ===
Sindhi is one of the most ancient languages among the regional languages of Pakistan and the sub-continent. The first translation of the Quran was into Sindhi. It has a rich literature including religion, philosophy, medicine, sociology, logic, literature, history, politics, and culture.

Shah Abdul Latif Bhittai, a writer of Sindhi poetry, is widely read and understood by people all over the world. He wrote Shah jo Risalo. Other popular poets are Sachal Sarmast and Shaikh Ayaz.

Jamal Abro, Ghulam Rabbani Agro, Ali Baba, Naseem Kharal, and Syed Irfan Ali Shah write short stories.

The Sindhi Adabi Board, Sindhi Language Authority, and Institute of Sindhology, have been involved in publishing many original and translated works into Sindhi. Amongst the works translated is Dry Leaves from Young Egypt by Eastwick in 1973.

== English books ==
=== Fiction ===
There are novel and short story writers who have won accolades nationally and internationally, but the line between Pakistani and non-Pakistani writers is dependent on whether a person born in Pakistan without staying there counts as Pakistani.

Zulfikar Ghose's Murder of Aziz Khan was the first cohesive modern English language Pakistani novel published in 1967. The plot was purely a Pakistani theme, but Ghose never resided in the country and the rest of his novels were set in South America.

In 1980, renowned novelist Bapsi Sidhwa published her first novel, The Crow Eaters, from England.

An amount of English literature came from expatriate Pakistanis in the West. Hanif Kureishi, wrote a memoir, The Rainbow Sign (1986) which tries to bring together the two worlds he lived in. Another, Aamer Hussein, wrote a series of short story collections.

English literature grew rapidly over the next few years and several writers emerged and won international awards. Adam ZameenZad, Hanif Kureishi, Nadeem Aslam, and Bapsi Sidhwa all received several awards for their writings.

In recent years, there has been a crop of younger writers. Amongst them are Bina Shah, Kamila Shamsie, Uzma Aslam Khan, and Sehba Sarwar. Most of these writers explore the issue of identity for expatriates and Muslim women, and other social issues. Bina Shah's 786 Cyber Café, for example, delves into the lives of three young Pakistani men and a young woman confused about her priorities. There is also Kamila Shamsie's Kartography, which details life in Karachi with the protagonists belonging to the elite section of the society. The focus on the upper class ran the risk of alienating the lower classes.

Since 2000, Uzma Aslam Khan, Mohsin Hamid, Saad Ashraf, Sorayya Khan, and Feryal Ali Gauhar have published several consummate new novels. Mohsin Hamid's Moth Smoke was a finalist for the PEN/Hemingway Award and won other awards. In 2004, novels of Nadeem Aslam and Suhyal Saadi, two Pakistani-British authors, were long listed for the 2006 IMPAC Dublin Award. They have also won several other prestigious awards. Kamila Shamsie's Broken Verses has also been long listed for the 2006 Prince Maurice Award.

A number of poetry collections were also published last year. A Pakistani-British woman, Moniza Ali, published her fifth poetry collection: How the Stone Found its Voice. The first part of her collection reflects the event after the 9/11 terrorist attacks and its effects.

There was also a collection of Faiz's poems published by OUP under the title of Culture and Identity: Selected English Writings of Faiz. In 2007, Mohsin Hamid's The Reluctant Fundamentalist was also published, exploring the effects of 9/11 on a Pakistani man in New York.

=== Non-fiction ===
Last year saw a number of autobiographies like Salma Ahmad's Cutting Free, Rao Rashid's Roller Coaster: My Early Years, Shaukat Mirza's From Exxon to Engro, and several others. Then there was a reprint of Tariq Ali's Street Fighting Years: An Autobiography of the Sixties, along with Nehru and the Gandhis: An Indian Dynasty. Another series is that of the historical reprints by Mohatta Palace on Karachi. In travelogues, there was Salman Rashid's Jhelum: City of Visata.

Previously, religious books were published only in Urdu, but in the last few years the trend has changed and now a number of publishers are taking up the task of either translating major works of religion from Urdu to English or are publishing original pieces.

=== Children’s books ===
Although there is a treasure trove of children's books in Urdu, Pakistan fails to provide much of English fiction for children. There have been attempts, but the market is full of international authors like Enid Blyton, Roald Dahl and the popular Sweet Valley, R.L Stine, Famous Five, Hardy Boys series. Very recently, Mahnaz Malik, a Pakistani born British, published her first story book for children, which serves as a fundraiser project for The Citizen's Foundation. Mo's Star, illustrated by Cora Lynn Deibler and published by Oxford University Press, is the colourful story of a young penguin reaching out for the stars. The book was received with appreciation from home and abroad, and was unveiled in a colourful launch ceremony held in a local hotel.

== Printing and Publishing industry ==
The literary world heavily relies on the physical printing of literature. Pakistan's printing industry is with its own sets of problems. The initial ones are: the unfavorable socio-economic conditions, a lack of mass education, and the development of local languages.

The establishment of the publishing industry in present-day Pakistan can be traced back to the nineteenth century. The subject matter of the books dealt mainly with religious or philosophical themes and was also very restrained.

World War I bought newer printing methods, and with these improved printing methods the industry moved a step further towards development. Press now ventured into the realms of subjects as diverse as philosophy, Islamic thought, and literary criticism. Even more encouraging was that important books were being translated from other languages into Urdu. These included chemistry, physics, economics, and political science and commerce books.

Another important milestone was the introduction of the printing of modern novels and short stories. Russian, French, and Bengali novels were also translated to add flavour to the local literature. World War II also bought a significant change in the industry. The printing methods were further improved and the publication industry saw a boost in sales and production with the rising literacy rates and the political awareness in the masses.

Since World War II, the publishing industry has been steadily growing despite the many hurdles like the low purchasing power of the masses and the lack of facilities. The principle centres of publishing are Karachi, Lahore and Peshawar. Lahore stands out with its numerous publishing houses and has been the hub of the industry from the pre-independence era. Even now, getting a book published from Lahore is much easier than elsewhere.

Pakistan's publishing industry also has a lucrative market for Urdu and religious books abroad. A considerable number of books and periodicals are exported to countries and regions like Malaysia, East Africa, and the Middle East. Also, a large number of books is imported in Pakistan, mainly from the UK and USA. The Inter-Media Growth program of Pakistan and USA have signed an agreement whereby Pakistan can import books and still pay for them in its local currency.

== Emerging trends ==
Time and technological advancements play a pivotal role in shaping trends over the passage of time. As Pakistan too enters the digital age, traditional distinctions in media become blurred. This can be negative as well as positive. It can be seen as furthering the book culture but it can also at the same time be seen as the force behind loosening the bond between the book and its reader.

=== E-books ===
The biggest contribution of the internet in the book industry is the digitization of books to grant them a wider readership. Entities have set up websites for the express purpose of disseminating books in a digital format. Some are free and others charge a fee to provide unlimited access to e-books. They can either be downloaded or read on screen. These have become popular because of easy accessibility and low cost. In Pakistan, where the majority of people cannot afford the expensive original foreign titles, websites like Project Gutenberg provide an opportunity to be familiarized with foreign literature. Some Urdu websites have started to offer online versions of books for foreign readers, with the benefit of teaching culture to foreigners and expatriate Pakistanis alike.

=== Online book stores ===
Closely related to e-books are the online bookstores. Extending traditional bookselling, they let customers search for books, read reviews, browse by category, and view covers, author information, and reader ratings before ordering physical book online. Although the books are not free and charge a shipping fee, customers can find and order physical books without visiting a store. Some critics, argue that online shopping removed the experience of browsing in a store and discovering new titles.

=== Reading clubs ===
Though not a new phenomenon, reading clubs revitalize book culture. There are a number of book clubs/reading clubs online and offline. People sit and discuss their favorite books or simply talk about what they are reading these days.

=== Book fairs ===
The first International Book Fair was held in Karachi and Lahore last year at the expo centre. It was well received by the public at large, despite all the books being originals and highly priced. People thronged the premises even if they did not buy much.

Book fairs in India have more books about certain subjects compared to Pakistani book fairs.

Then there are also the annual book fairs held at various places, especially in schools, colleges, and universities.

Among weekly affairs, the Koocha-e-Saqafat and Frere Hall book fairs in Karachi are a choice of venue. They have a collection of books on a range of topics. They are usually second-hand or reprinted, Although their printing and selling is a violation of copyright law, Karachiites gather at the spot for book hunting.

Urdu Bazaar at Lahore is the largest market of paper print, books, and stationery in Pakistan. Old Anarkali, Nisbat Road, Mall Road, Nila Gumbad, and Lohari Gate have numerous small and large bookshops selling new and used books. More than half of the books in Pakistan are printed in Lahore.

In 2025, the 5-day Karachi World Book Fair had attracted more than 550,000 people including students from more than 300 schools, colleges, universities, and seminaries.

=== Mobile bookshops ===
The concept of a mobile bookshop was first used by the Welcome Book Port some years back. Recently, Oxford started its own mobile book shop and it has been touring the city. Set on a truck, with the back converted into a small book shop with shelves and a counter set snugly at the end, the book shop attracted people outside various schools and universities.

== Literary Festivals ==
There are three major literary festivals that take place in Lahore, Islamabad, and Karachi. The Lahore Literary Festival (LLF) is a major literary event for publishers, booksellers, authors, and readers. Founded by Razi Ahmed in 2012, the LLF "aims to bring together, discuss, and celebrate the diverse and pluralistic literary traditions of Lahore." It has attracted the likes of Mohsin Hamid, Ayesha Jalal, Bapsi Sidhwa, and C.M.Naim. The LLF has also conducted events in New York, in partnership with the Asia Society, and in London. The Karachi Literature Festival (KLF) and Islamabad Literature Festival (ILF) are founded by Ameena Saiyid and Asif Farrukhi, and produced by Oxford University Press. The KLF began in 2010, while the ILF was started in 2013. Much like the LLF, both KLF and ILF attract attention of authors, academics, and publishers. Famous attendees include Intizar Hussain, Amjad Islam Amjad, Kamila Shamsie, Zehra Nigah, and Zia Mohyeddin.

Six literary prizes are awarded at the KLF:

1. KLF Coca-Cola prize
2. KLF Peace prize
3. KLF Embassy of France prize
4. KLF Urdu prize
5. KLF Fiction prize
6. Italy Reads Pakistan award

== Issues ==
=== Copyright infringement of books in Pakistan ===
The Copyright Ordinance of 1962 came into force in 1967 in Pakistan and has been in effect since then. A number of conditions are given in the ordinance which determines when a work is in violation of copyright.

Pakistan is also a member of Berne Convention on copyright as well as the Universal Copyright Convention.

The boom in the education industry created a vast market for text books, both for school and post-school levels. Where the primary sector is largely catered to by the local textbook boards, there is a serious dearth for books on professional subjects like medical, engineering or business. Thus increased the demand for foreign books. Due to import limitations the prices of these books were totally out of reach of an average Pakistani student. The National Book Foundation was set up to reprint and translate foreign titles with the permission of the original publisher. This was to make the prices affordable and within reach. But even this effort was not as successful as hoped because most of the reprinted titles were either obsolete or were very old editions.

People who recognized this vacuum began a successful industry of illegally copied books. Almost all major tiles were reprinted illegally and were sold at a fraction of the original price. Not only were text books copied and distributed but the recent years have seen a number of local and international fiction works being leaked before the release of original titles in paper back.

The release of the Harry Potter books can be taken as a classic example of this case. The book was all set to be released on 12 August and there was a huge hype surrounding its release. Almost all major book stores throughout the world had millions of books booked prior to the release. Even in Pakistan, a couple of leading bookstores were providing the facility of pre-ordering the book and getting a nominal discount.

The trend of illegally reproducing books is not limited to international bestsellers. Usually one does not find unlicensed versions of books by Pakistani authors so easily but there is a market for such books as well. Tehmina Durrani's My Feudal Lord, Bapsi Sidhwa's An American Brat, are only but two examples.

When asked about the situation, Bapsi Sidhwa, a leading Pakistani English prose writer, says "Piracy is a problem because of the steep prices. However some pirates are developing a conscience and assigning my previously pirated books to publishers. They have made a packet off me, but so long as books are read, I don't mind as much as I should. If we have more publishers and a larger reading public, the prices could be better controlled".

There have been numerous raids on Urdu Bazaar shops for selling infringed books, but this has done little to deter their suppliers.

=== Incentives for writers ===
Original writers in Pakistan face against reprinters. This results in young authors getting their works published under foreign publishers instead of remaining local.

=== Decline in reading habits ===
There has been a visible decline in reading habits in last few decades. This can be attributed to a number of factors like television, internet, and other means of entertainment. However, another major factor is the increasing high retail prices beyond the buying power of general public.

According to a nationally representative survey conducted in 2009 by the Gilani Research Foundation in collaboration with Gallup Pakistan, approximately 27% of Pakistanis identify reading as a personal habit, while 73% report not reading books outside of academic syllabi. The study highlights that reading is more prevalent among men (31%) than women (23%). Among those who read, 56% reported reading at least once a week, while 18% read biweekly, and 22% read monthly. When asked about their preferred genres, 41% favored informative books, followed by religious texts (30%), novels, digests, or magazines (27%), and poetry (10%). The findings are considered notable in the context of Pakistan’s relatively low literacy rate, which was estimated at 55% in the 2007–08 Economic Survey.
