= Noor Afroz Khuwaja =

Pakistani writer (1947–1998)

Dr Noor Afroz Khuwaja
- نور افروز خواجہ
- Born: 5 July 1953; Hyderabad, Sindh, Pakistan
- Education: PhD in Sindhi Literature
- Alma mater: University of Sindh
- Occupations: Educationist, Writer, Critique
- Writing career
- Period: 1973 - 2015
- Notable works: Seven books on Sindhi Literature, Culture and History
- Notable awards: Saami Award, Allama Ghulam Mustafa Qasmi Award

Noor Afroz Khuwaja (Sindhi: نور افروز خواجہ, July 5, 1953) is an educationist, writer and critic from Hyderabad, Sindh, Pakistan. She has served as Dean, Faculty of Arts at University of Sindh Jamshoro. She was editor of the International Journal of Arts and Humanities and the literary magazine Keenjhar and has authored seven books in the Sindhi language.

== Early life and education ==
Noor Afroz Khuwaja was born on 5 July 1953 at Tando Wali Muhammad, Hyderabad Sindh. Her father Ahmad Ali Tahirani Khuwaja was a businessman from Dando (Sindhi: ڏندو)Town of District Badin, Sindh. She received primary education from Training College Hyderabad. She got first position in Sindh in Primary School Scholarship examination. She was also position holder in the eighth class Scholarship examination. She passed Matriculation examination from Government Miran School Hyderabad and Intermediate from Zubaida Girls College Hyderabad. She graduated from University of Sindh in 1973 in Sindhi. She did PhD from the same university in 1997 under the supervision of the renowned scholar Allama Ghulam Mustafa Qasmi.

== Career ==
She began her career as a lecturer in the Sindhi Department of Sindh University in 1973. She became professor of the same department in 1997. She served as chairman of the department from 2005 to 2013 and then as Dean Faculty of Arts from 2010 to 2013. She also served as the director of Mirza Qaleech Baig Chair. She was member of many academic, literary and social institutes including member board of governors of Sindhi Language Authority, member of advisory committee of the Institute of Sindhology, and member of board of studies of various universities.

== Literary contributions ==
Dr Noor Afroz has authored more than 100 research articles and the following books:

- Pardehi Akhaniyoon (پرڏيھي آکاڻيون), Collection of Stories
- Aghiya Suta sandan (اگھيا سٽ سندان), essays on the life and poetry of Shah Abdul Latif Bhittai
- Wirhagay khan Poe Sindhi Navel jo Awser (ورھاڱي کان پوءِ سنڌي ناول جي اوسر), PhD Thesis
- Pani Pat Kana (پاڻي پٽ ڪڻا), Essays
- Mushik Khathoori Man (مشڪ کٿوري مڻ), Essays
- Aagam Kayo Achan (آگم ڪيو اچن)
- Shah Latif jay Kalam men Istilah, Pahaka aeen Chawniyoon (شاھ لطيف جي ڪلام ۾ اصطلاح، پھاڪا ۽ چوڻيون)

== Awards and honours ==
- Sami Literary Award
- Agha Khan Social Award
- Allama Ghulam Mustafa Qasmi Award
