= Akbar Jiskani =

Pakistani writer

- اڪبر جسڪاڻي
- Born: Ali Akbar Jiskani; 1 September 1958; Johi Sindh, Pakistan
- Died: 13 August 1999 (aged 40); Hyderabad Sindh, Pakistan
- Education: MA Sindhi literature
- Alma mater: University of Sindh
- Occupation: Author
- Writing career
- Subjects: Short Story, Novel
- Movement: Progressive

Akbar Jiskani (Sindhi: اڪبر جسڪاڻي, Urdu: اکبرجسکانی) (1 September 1958 – 13 August 1999) was a Pakistani writer from Sindh, Pakistan.

== Early life ==
According to the Sindhi Affair News Karachi, Jiskani was born to Jaam Khan Jiskani on 1 September 1958 at Johi, Pakistan. Jiskani became an orphan in childhood when his father died in Saudi Arabia. Jiskani's grandmother raised him. He earned a Master's degree in Sindhi literature.

== Career ==
Akbar Jiskani authored four books of short stories and novels. He was a prominent writer of children's Sindhi literature. After his death, a library was established in his memory in Johi in 1999, under the chairmanship of Makhdoom Muhammad Zaman Talibul Moula, Muhammad Ibrahim Joyo and others. Jiskani remained editor of the Sindhi Adabi Board Jamshoro children's magazine Gul Phul.

== Death ==
Jiskani died on 13 August 1999 in Sehrish Nagar, Hyderabad, Sindh, Pakistan.
