= Imdad Hussaini =

Pakistani poet (1940–2022)

Imdad Hussaini Sindhi: امداد حسيني
- Syed Imdad Hussain Shah
- Born: 10 March 1940; Hyderabad, Sind, British India
- Died: 27 August 2022 (aged 82); Karachi, Sindh, Pakistan
- Education: M.A. Sindhi
- Alma mater: University of Sindh Jamshoro
- Occupations: Poet, writer
- Writing career
- Pen name: Imdad Hussaini
- Notable awards: Pride of Performance Award by the President of Pakistan in 2003

Imdad Hussaini (Sindhi: ﺍﻣﺪﺍﺩ ﺣﺴﻴﻨﻲ, Urdu: ﺍﻣﺪﺍﺩ ﺣﺴﻴﻨﻰ; 10 March 1940 – 27 August 2022) was a Pakistani Sindhi poet and Urdu language writer.

== Early life and career ==
Imdad Hussaini was a poet, short story writer, scholar and lyricist. Many singers including Abida Parveen, Bilquis Khanum, Arshad Mehmood, Robina Qureshi and Zarina Baloch have sung his songs for Radio Pakistan and Pakistan Television. He was born in Tikharu, a village on the left bank of the River Indus in Hyderabad District, Sindh. His father's name was Syed Fazal Mohammed Shah, who was the first cousin of Syed Miran Mohammad Shah, the second speaker of the Sindh Assembly. Imdad Hussaini was an educationist by profession. He did M.A. in Sindhi literature. He worked in various literary institutions of Sindh, such as the Sindhi Adabi Board, the Sindh Textbook Board, the Institute of Sindhology and served on the Board of Governors of the Sindhi Language Authority. He was Secretary of Sindhi Adabi Board during 1992–1993, editor of the board's literary journal, Mehran, from 1977 to 1979, and its managing editor from 2004 to 2006.

== Death ==
Hussaini died on 27 August 2022 in Karachi after a prolonged illness.

== Published works ==
- Hawa Jay Samhoon
- Shehar
- Imdad Aahay Rol
- Kirnay Jehro Pal

He translated in Urdu, Mirza Qaleech Baig's novel Zeenat; Urdu translation by Imdad Hussaini; published by Pakistan Academy of Letters, Islamabad in 1978.

He also translated a historical epic tale (originating about a thousand years ago) of Sindh in Urdu:

- Dodo Chanesar, Urdu translation by Imdad Hussaini; published by the National Institute of Folk and Traditional Heritage, Islamabad in 1975.

He compiled two books:

- Sindh je Deeni Adab jo Catalogue, published by Institute of Sindhology in 1971
- Mual Manhoo Jeeari Peeda by Tikhur Publications

== Awards and recognition ==
- Pride of Performance Award by the President of Pakistan in 2003
- Josh Malihabadi Lifetime Achievement Award in 2007
- Allama Iqbal Award for Urdu poetry for his book Dhoop Kiran in 2016

== See also ==
- List of Pakistani writers
- List of Sindhi language poets
- Sindhi literature
- Sindhi poetry

== Relevant sources ==
- Ahmed, Javed Ahmed Shaikh Javed. "Proverbs and sayings in the Poetry of Imadad Hussaini." Sindhi Boli Research Journal 15, no. 2nd (2022): 1-15.
