= Sindhology =

Field of South Asian studies

Sindhology (Sindhi: سنڌيات) is a field of South Asian studies and academic research that covers the history, society, culture, literature and people of Sindh region of Pakistan. The subject was first brought into the academic circles with the establishment of the Institute of Sindhology at Sindh University in 1964. Since then, it has developed into a discipline that covers the aspects of history and archaeology from the Indus Valley civilization to the modern Sindhi society. The subject has also received wider attention at international levels. An academic or expert who specialises in Sindhology is called a Sindhologist.

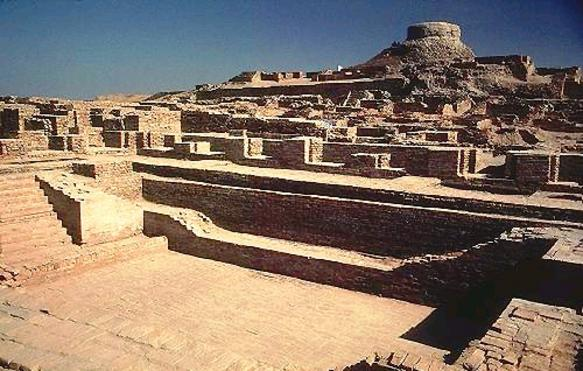
Mohenjo-Daro - the significant symbol of Sindhology

== History ==
The term Sindhology to denote a subject of knowledge about Sindh was first coined in 1964 with the establishment of the Institute of Sindhology. The objective at the time was to promote the study and broader research on Sindh, and develop a repository of archives, books, manuscripts, and research papers. Another wider objective was to promote the knowledge about Sindh in various other national and regional languages of Pakistan, as well as international languages such as Arabic, English, Persian and Urdu.

The subject was actually developed on the patterns of Egyptology and Indology. The study area encompassed the multidisciplinary research about the land that has been shaped by the 5000 years old Indus Valley civilization as well as the Indus River (locally known as Sindhu Darya). This enables the scope of the study to cover the antiquities, relics, culture, traditions, and literature with unique forms of music, art, and poetry that has prevailed in both the ancient and modern Sindh.

== Organisations ==
- Institute of Sindhology, Pakistan
- Indian Institute of Sindhology
- American Institute of Sindhology

== Prominent Sindhologists ==
The first major attempt to bring together the leading Sindhologists was an international seminar 'Sindh Through the Centuries' held in Karachi in the spring of 1975 under the auspices of the Government of Sindh. Some of the prominent names in Sindhology include:

- Ali S. Asani
- Dr. Nabi Bux Khan Baloch
- Hassam-ud-Din Rashidi
- Ahmad Hasan Dani
- Annemarie Schimmel
- Allama I. I. Kazi
- Asko Parpola
- Jean-François Jarrige
- N. G. Majumdar
- K. R. Malkani
- Muhammad Usman Diplai
- Ghulam Rabbani Agro
- Sarah Ansari

== See also ==
- Encyclopedia Sindhiana
- Sindhi Adabi Board
- Jamshoro
- List of museums in Pakistan
