= Shaukat Shoro =

Pakistani writer

Shaukat Hussain Shoro (Sindhi: شوڪت شورو, Urdu: شوکت شورو); (4 July 1947 – d. November 9, 2021), from Sindh, Pakistan, was a famous short story writer, playwright and columnist of the Sindhi language.

== Early life ==
Shaukat Shoro was born to Abdul Kareem Shoro at a village near Sujawal city of Sujawal District, in Sindh. He got his early education from Chandia High School Sujawal in 1963. He did intermediate from Sachal Arts and Commerce College Hyderabad Sindh and did M.A from University of Sindh Jamshoro in 1968. Shoro had started writing from childhood. His writings were published in various newspapers and magazines. He wrote radio and television plays as well. He served as a script producer at Pakistan Television Corporation Karachi Center from 1974 to 1976. Later he was appointed as student welfare of stakes officer in 1977. He rendered his services as administrative officer on different posts in University of Sindh.

== Career ==
He has created more than 60 short stories, numerous dramas, columns and articles in the Sindhi language and enriched Sindhi literature. His literary and creative work has appeared in the form of books in Pakistan and India. His short story "Death of fear" is included in a book of short stories published in India in 2009. He has also published volumes of short stories "Khoi Hui Perchhai" in 2017 and "Colour of night". His third book is compilation entitled "Hundred Sindhi short stories".

He remained director of the Institute of Sindhology, University of Sindh, Pakistan.

== Death ==
Shaukat Shoro died on November 9, 2021, in Karachi.
