= Waskaro =

Pakistani Sindhi-language children's magazine

Waskaro (Sindhi وسڪارو) is a Sindhi-language children's magazine published by Mehran Publication in Hyderabad, Sindh, Pakistan. Its first issue was published in 1990. Waskaro contains short stories, poems, articles and other content of interest to the children. Prominent Sindhi writers and poets such as Hameed Sindhi, Aasi Zamini, Altaf Malkani, Ustad Bukhari, and Zulfiqar Ali Bhatti have written for Waskaro.

== See also ==
- Sindhi Literature
- Gul Phul
