= Khair-un-Nissa Jaffery =

Pakistani writer (1947–1998)

- خيرالنساء جعفري
- Born: 17 August 1947; Hyderabad, Sindh, Pakistan
- Died: 4 March 1998 (aged 50); Hyderabad, Sindh
- Resting place: Hyderabad, Sindh
- Education: University of Sindh
- Occupations: Story writer, Educationist
- Children: 1
- Writing career
- Period: 1974 - 1998
- Notable work: 'Hostel Khan Haveli tain' 'Takhleeq jo maut'

Khair-un-Nissa Jaffery (17 August 1947 - 4 March 1998) (Sindhi: خيرالنساء جعفري) was a short story writer, critic, and educationist from Hyderabad, Sindh, Pakistan. She served as a Professor and Chairperson of the Department of Psychology of Sindh University, Jamshoro.

== Biography ==
Khair-un-Nissa Jaffery was born on 17 August 1947 in a Sindhi Khoja family at Tando Wali Muhammad, Hyderabad, Sindh. Her parents were from Talhar, Badin district. Her father, Ahmed Ali Khowaja, was a professor of Islamic Culture, and her mother, Shireen, was a homemaker. She studied at Miran School and then attended Zubaida Girls College in Hyderabad. She obtained a master's degree in psychology from the University of Sindh. She started her career as a lecturer of psychology at the University of Sindh in 1970 and later retired as a Professor and chairperson of the same department.

She had an interest in literature and writing since childhood. Her first story, "Berozgari Aeen Bandooq" (Joblessness and Gun), was published in the literary magazine Sojhro when she was 27 years old. Her first book of short stories, titled Takhleeqa Jo Maut (Death of Creation), was published in 1978.

In Sindhi literature, she is known as a bold writer, but at the same time, she was a very simple, clean-hearted, and sympathetic woman. She was a noble story writer and was open-minded and talkative. Her stories depict a reflection of women's psychological, mental, emotional, and internal feelings. She has described woman's oppression, weakness, and compulsion very boldly.

Her story, "Havelia Khan Hostel Taeen" (Sindhi: حويليءَ کان هاسٽل تائين), transitions from the minimalist atmosphere of the mansion to the open space of the hostel. This story became so popular that it was translated into Hindi, Urdu, Chinese, and Malayalam languages. Her other notable stories include, "Peera Jo Parlau" (Sindhi: پيڙا جو پڙلاءُ) (Echo of Pain), "Kahro Brand Aeen Kahro Cigarette" (Which Brand and Which Cigarette), "Qurbatoon Aeen Fasila" (Nearness and Distances), "Tutal Sochoon" (Broken Thoughts), and "Municipality Aeen Kuta" (Municipality and Dogs), etc.

A compilation of all of Jaffery's works, My Creative Journey, was published in 1992 by the Sindhica Academy Karachi, which includes stories, speeches, interviews, and her travel to India. Noted writer Tanveer Junejo has also written a book, titled Khair-un-Nissa Jaffery - Shakhsiat aeen Fun on her personality and writings.
