= Jaffery =

Jaffery is a surname. Notable people with the name include:

- Khair-un-Nissa Jaffery (1947–1998), Pakistani short story writer, critic, and educationist
- Lubna Jaffery (born 1980), Norwegian politician for the Labour Party
- Meezaan Jaffery or Meezaan Jafri (born 1995), Indian actor who works in Hindi films
- Naila Jaffery or Naila Jaffri, Pakistani actress and director
- Rumi Jaffery, Indian scriptwriter and filmmaker who works predominantly in Hindi cinema
- Saeed Jaffery or Saeed Jaffrey (1929–2015), British-Indian actor
- Safta Jaffery (1958–2017), the British founder and owner of one of the first producer management companies in the United Kingdom called SJP/Dodgy Productions
- Sakina Jaffery or Sakina Jaffrey (born 1962), American actress
- Sheldon Jaffery (1934–2003), American bibliographer
- Yunus Jaffery (1930–2016), Indian scholar of the Persian language

== See also ==
- Jaffery Sports Club Ground, cricket ground situated in Nairobi, Kenya
- Jaffrey (disambiguation)
