= Abdul Jabbar Junejo =

Sindhi litterateur

- عبدالجبار جوڻيجو
- Born: Abdul Jabbar Junejo; 26 November 1935; Badin, Sindh, British India
- Died: 12 July 2011 (aged 75); Karachi, Pakistan
- Education: M.A Sindhi literature, Doctor of Philosophy, University of Sindh
- Occupation: Educationist/Writer
- Writing career
- Genres: Literary Criticism, History, Fiction, Poetry
- Subject: Sindhi literature
- Notable work: Books on History of Sindhi literature
- Movement: Progressive

Dr. Abdul Jabbar Junejo (26 November 1935 – 12 July 2011) was a Sindhi writer, poet, novelist, story-writer, critic, linguist, historian and musicologist of Sindh, Pakistan.

== Early life ==
He was born on 26 November 1935 at Pir Fateh Shah village, District Badin, Sindh, Pakistan. In 1962, he did his MA in Sindhi with distinction and was awarded the gold medal. He earned his Ph.D. with his thesis on “The Influence of Persian Poetry on Sindhi Poetry”. He had a good deal of language competence in English, Chinese and Persian.

== Career ==
He started his career as a junior lecturer in 1960 and joined the Department of Sindhi, University of Sindh, Jamshoro as a lecturer in Sindhi in 1962. He served as the chairperson of the Department of Sindhi and also rose to become the Dean, Faculty of Art, University of Sindh, Jamshoro. He also served as a director of Laar Museum from 2004 to 2007.

== Contribution ==
He wrote the Brief History of Sindhi Literature in three volumes. He produced monumental critical work on the poetry of Shah Abdul Latif. He was a great connoisseur on Sindhi classic music. There are 65 books in the Sindhi language, 10 books in the Urdu language, and about 200 research articles on the various topics to his credit. On December 18, 2011, Sussui Palejo, minister of Culture Department, inaugurated Dr. Abdul Jabbar Junejo Corner, at Zafar Kazim Art Gallery, in Sindh Museum, Hyderabad. After his death a hall in Sindhi Department of Sindh University Jamshoro had been named Abdul Jabbar Junejo Hall to honour his services.

== Death ==
Abdul Jabbar Junejo died due to kidney failure on 12 July 2011. He was laid to rest in his ancestral graveyard in Pir Fateh Shah village.
