= Ghulam Mustafa Qasmi =

Scholar, Sindhi language writer of Pakistan

Allama Ghulam Mustafa Qasmi
- Born: 24 June 1924; Village Rais Banbho Khan Chandio, Miro Khan, Sindh
- Died: 9 December 2003 (aged 79); Hyderabad, Pakistan (buried at Hyderabad

Allama Ghulam Mustafa Qasmi (Sindhi: علامه غلام مصطفيٰ قاسمي) (b. 1924 – d.2003) was a scholar, Sindhi language writer and Sindhologist.

== Education and early life ==
G.M. Qasmi was born on 24 June 1924 in the Village of Rais Banbho Khan Chandio, Taluko Miro Khan, Larkana District. He got his early education from Maulana Fateh Mohammad Serani and Maulana Khusi Mohammad MiroKhani. He later attended Darul Uloom Deoband where he met Ubaidullah Sindhi and Hussain Ahmed Madani. He was an expert in Hadith, Fiqah, Tafseer and Logic (Mantaq).

== Career ==
He taught in Sindh Muslim College, Karachi, University of Sindh and Madarisa Mazhar-e-ullom, Karachi. He was the director of Shah Waliullah academy, Hyderabad, chairman of Sindhi Adabi Board, and chairman of Ruet-e-Hilal Committee from 1977 to 1989.

He guided young scholars in their research-oriented work and more than 50 PhD scholars completed their research work under his supervision.

=== Work ===
He started his literary journey from the Shah Jo Risalo of Shah Abdul Latif Bhittai. He wrote, compiled and translated books of various topics regarding religion and Islamix culture of Arabic and Persian in the Sindhi language He wrote a book Mufeed al taliba regarding the Logic during his educational years, which is being still taught at the various Madarassah. He wrote a book Social justice and Collectivism (Sindhi: سماجي انصاف ۽ اجتماعيت) (Roman-Sindhi name (Samaji Insaf Aeen Ijtamaayat)) in the light of Shah Wali ullah and a book on Features of the Quran . He edited Farsi-translated Quran and Tafsir Surah Saba.

== Recognition and awards ==
He was awarded with Sitara-i-Imtiaz by the Government of Pakistan. A Chair was formed at University of Sindh in award and recognition of his name "Qasmi Chair".

== Death ==
He died on December 9, 2003, and was buried near the tomb of Ghulam Nabi Kalhoro.

== See also ==
- Tafsir work in Sindhi
