= Laat =

Sindhi-language children's magazine

Laat (Sindhi لاٽ) is a Sindhi-language children's magazine published by Mehran Publication Hyderabad, Sindh, Pakistan. It started in 1988 and got immediate attention of Sindhi children. It was founded by Altaf Malkani and Zulfiqar Ali Bhatti. It contains short stories, poems, articles and many more things of interest to the children.

== See also ==
- Waskaro (Children's Magazine)
- Gul Phul
