= AllahDad Bohyo =

Sindhi scholar and litterateur (1934–1994)

Dr AllahDad Bohyo
- ڊاڪٽر الهداد ٻوهيو
- Born: AllahDad Bohyo; 8 August 1934; Kamber Sindh, British India
- Died: 16 July 1994 (aged 59); Tando Adam
- Citizenship: Pakistani
- Education: PhD University of Sindh
- Occupations: Teacher, linguist, Poet, and Philosopher
- Spouse: Pof. Mrs. Noor Jehan
- Children: Muhammad Ali, Sindhya (HUMA), Haya o Nisa and Nasraan
- Relatives: Abdullah Bohyo, Ghulam Mustafa Bohyo, imdad ali bohyo
- Writing career
- Period: 1977
- Genre: Literature
- Subject: Sindhi Language
- Movement: Progressive
- Website: allahdadbohyo.webs.com

Dr AllahDad Bohyo (Sindhi: ڊاڪٽر الهداد ٻوهيو; 8 August 1934 – 16 July 1994) was a known writer, educationist, scholar, linguist and poet of Sindh, Pakistan. He was born in the village of Ghoghari, Larkana District, Sindh.

== Education ==
He did Master of Arts in English and Bachelor of Teaching. He got PhD degree in 1977 under the supervision of Ghulam Ali Allana from University of Sindh. The topic of his research article was "Sindhi Boli jo Samaji Karaj" (Sindhi: سنڌي ٻوليءَ جو سماجي ڪارج; English: The Social Function of the Sindhi Language).

== Professional career ==
Dr. AllahDad Bohyo started his practical life as a teacher in 1957. Later on he was promoted as director of education and remained on this post till the last days of his life. Dr. Bohyo is known as literary circle with his criticism and linguistic qualities. He worked his whole life for the promotion of language and literature, his favorite fields were research and he took a deep interest in social linguistics.

== Publications ==
His PhD thesis was published by Institute of Sindhology in 1978. His articles and essays have been published in different periodicals and newspapers. He has also written some books on research and criticism. It includes "Tanqeedaan" in 1980. Adab ja fikri moharik (Sindhi: ادب جا فڪري محرڪ) in 1984 and Ilm Tahkqee in 1970. Dr. Bohyo has compiled a book on poetry named "Chonday kano Kano " (Sindhi: چوندي ڪڻو ڪڻو) but so far it has not published.

== Death ==
He died on 16 July 1994 from a heart attack while he was addressing a Seminar at Tando Adam, Sindh.
