= Jaffray =

Jaffray may refer to:

- Jaffray, British Columbia, Canada
- Jaffray baronets, a title in the Baronetage of the United Kingdom
- "Katharine Jaffray", a traditional Scottish ballad

== People with the surname ==
- David Jaffray (born c. 1970), Canadian medical physicist
- Jason Jaffray (born 1981), Canadian hockey player
- Jean-Yves Jaffray (1939–2009), French mathematician and economist
- John Jaffray (journalist) (1818–1901), British journalist
- Julia K. Jaffray (1878–1941), Canadian-American prison reformer
- Lyn Jaffray (born 1950), New Zealand All Black rugby union player
- Merv Jaffray (born 1949), New Zealand All Black rugby union player
- Robert A. Jaffray (1873–1945), Canadian religious leader
- William Jaffray (footballer) (1885–1968), Scottish footballer
- William Jaffray (politician) (1832–1896), Canadian newspaper editor and mayor of Berlin, Ontario

== See also ==
- Jaffrey (disambiguation)
