= Farah Naz Talpur =

Pakistani chemist

Farah Naz Talpur, Ph.D. (2007), is a Pakistani chemist, who is active in the fields of analytical chemistry and environmental science; she is an associate professor of the University of Sindh and sub-editor of Pakistan Journal of Analytical and Environmental Chemistry.

== Works ==
- Talpur, F. N. 2007. Fatty Acid Composition of Ruminant Milk, Meat and Dairy Products of Livestock in Sindh, Pakistan. Ph.D. Thesis / advisor Prof. Dr. Muhammad Iqbal Bhanger, University of Sindh, Jamshoro, Pakistan, 194 p.

== Literature ==
- Ritota M., Manzi P. Melamine detection in milk and dairy products: Traditional analytical methods and recent developments // Food Analytical Methods. — 2017. — July (vol. 11, iss. 1). — P. 128–147. — ISSN 1936-9751. — DOI:10.1007/s12161-017-0984-1.
- M. Esteki, J. Simal-Gandara, Z. Shahsavari, S. Zandbaaf, E. Dashtaki, Yvan Vander Heyden. A review on the application of chromatographic methods, coupled to chemometrics, for food authentication // Food Control. — 2018. — November (vol. 93). — P. 165–182. — ISSN 0956-7135. — DOI:10.1016/j.foodcont.2018.06.015.

== Web-sources ==
- Shumaila Solangi (2017-08-23). "Dr. Farah Naz Talpur: Associate Professor". University of Sindh.
- "Faculty: Dr. Farah Naz TALPUR". Jamshoro, Sindh: National Centre of Excellence in Analytical Chemistry. Archived from the original on 2018-10-24.
