= Ghulam Rabbani Agro =

Sindhi litterateur

- Born: Ghulam Rabbani Agro; 5 November 1933; Village Agra, Naushehro Feroze District, Sindh, Pakistan
- Died: 18 January 2010 (aged 76); Hyderabad, Sindh Province, Pakistan
- Resting place: Village Agra, Naushehro Feroze District, Sindh, Pakistan
- Education: S.M. College, Karachi
- Occupations: Writer and government official
- Writing career
- Language: Sindhi; Urdu; English; Persian
- Genres: Short stories, biographical sketches
- Notable works: Jehra Gul Gulab Ja; Sindh Ja Bar, Bahar, aen Pahar; Manhun Shahar Bhambore Ja
- Notable awards: Sindh Madrassah Celebration Awards; Sitara-e-Imtiaz

Ghulam Rabbani Agro (5 November 1933 – 18 January 2010; Sindhi: غلام رباني آگرو) was a Pakistani writer and a prominent name of Sindhi literature. He was a pioneer of revised-era of Sindhi short story in the post-partition era. His literary career though started with Sindhi short story took many turns whereby he contributed a number of literary and scholarly articles on varied topics including history of Sindhi language, culture, religion, biographies of prominent personalities, and many more.

== Personal life ==
=== Background ===
Ghulam Rabbani Agro was born on 5 November 1933, in village Muhammad Khan Agro of district Nausheharo Feroze, Sindh. His father was a prominent educationist of his time and therefore contributed towards his literary grooming in the early years of his life. Ghulam Rabbani Agro acquired his primary education from the local schools, and then proceeded to SMA College Karachi, where he completed his B.A in English Literature in 1957.

== Career ==
=== Journalism ===
Ghulam Rabbani Agro started his career in journalism by joining Ministry of Information. His first assignment there was co-editing of the Magazine “Naeen Zindagi” together with Maulana Abdul Wahid Sindhi. Mr. Agro had also worked with Sobho Gayanchandani as sub-editor of “Naen Sindh”. He was founding editor of Quarterly Gul Phul, a popular children's magazine published by Sindhi Adabi Board. Mr. Agro was also chief editor of literary magazine “Adabiyat” published by Pakistan Academy of Letters.

=== Government jobs ===
Ghulam Rabbani Agro joined Sindhi Adabi Board (SAB) in 1957 as assistant secretary. Later, he was promoted to the post of secretary in SAB in 1970s. He remained serving Sindhi Adabi Board in various capacities until 1976. During his thirty years career at SAB, he undertook more than 300 various publishing projects on Sindh's literature, culture, language and history. Later, he was appointed as first pro-vice chancellor of University of Sindh, Jamshoro. He served to University of Sindh until 1979 and then joined his parent organization, Sindhi Adabi Board. In 1984, he was appointed director (admin) Pakistan Academy of Letters (PAL) and then was promoted to the post of director general. He rose to the chairmanship of Pakistan Academy of letters and retired from the same post in 1993. During his ten years period at PAL, Mr. Agro not only provided a strong base to PAL and transformed it as a national institute by establishing provincial offices and made several schemes to promote national integration. His major projects were translation of various works of writers of four provinces in Urdu and vice versa. In 1993, he was appointed as Member of Federal Public Service Commission. He completed his term as member FPSC and returned to Hyderabad. He joined Sindhi Adabi Board as Honorary Secretary and continued to serve the board in the same capacity until 2002 when he was appointed chairman of the board.

Ghulam Rabbani Agro during his career also served many other organizations such as Ombudsman Sindh and remained head of institutions like Urdu Science Board Lahore and National Institute of Historical and Cultural Research Pakistan, Islamabad. Besides that, he was on the board of governors of various learned bodies such as Iqbal Academy Pakistan Lahore, Quaid–e-Azam Academy Karachi, Urdu Dictionary Board Lahore, Institute of Islamic Culture, Lahore, Institute of Sindhology, Jamshoro, Sindhi Adabi Board, Jamshoro, Pakistan Film Censor Board, Islamabad etc.

== Literary works and books ==
Ghulam Rabbani Agro wrote a number of books on diversifying topics as well as many articles that were published during his life from time to time. He started his literary career by participating in a short story contest where he grabbed first prize. This encouraged him to write many other short stories which became very popular in masses.

Mr. Agro's stories' subject matter was the hardships and atrocities faced by the oppressed and subjugated class of sindhi society- the haris (peasants). His writings played a vital role for creating awareness among masses against the dictatorial and barbaric role of Sindhi feudal. He continued his message by his subsequent writings too.

Though, Mr. Agro's majority books are in Sindhi, he also contributed many writings in Urdu and English. His books in Urdu and English are in process of compilation.

1. Aab-e-Hayat ( آب حیات) The collection of short stories written by Mr. Agro were published under the title “Aab-e-Hayat”. The translation of the same book in Urdu is on its
  way and will be published soon. The book will be published under the auspices of Pakistan Academy of letters. Aab-e-Hayat was highly praised by the literary circles of
  that time.The book now is part of Sindhi classics and has been re-published by Roshni Publications, Hyderabad posthumously.
2. Jehra Gul Gulab ja (جهڙا گل گلاب جا) Agro Sahab's other prominent book is “Jehra Gul Gulab ja”. Book covers an account of famous personalities that Mr. Agro came across in his life and that somehow influenced him. The book is very popular among masses due to its beautiful narration and use of simple yet captivating language. Introduction of the book can be found at the website of Sindhi adabi Board http://www.sindhiadabiboard.org/Catalogue/Personalties/Book24/Book_page1.html
3. Sindh ja Bar, Baharaen Pahar (سنڌ جا بر، بحر ۽ پهاڙ) The book is a research work on the lives of three Sufi saints, Lal Shahbaz Qalandar, Pir Muhammad Rashid Rozae Dhani, and Ghous Bahauddin Zakria. Book has been published by Sindhi Adabi Board, Jamshoro.
4. Manhun Shahr Bhanmbhore ja (ماٹھون شھر ڀنڀور جا) Posthumously, a number of books have also been published, the most significant being “Manhun Shahr Bhanmbhore ja”.The book was completed by Agro Sb and was in the last stages of its final draft when Agro Sahab left this world. It was later published by Sindhi Adabi Board posthumously. The introduction of the book is available online at Sindhi Adabi Board's website http://www.sindhiadabiboard.org/Catalogue/Personalties/Book63/Book_page1.html.
5. Sindhi Adabtay Taraki Pasand tehreek jo asar (سنڌي ادب تي ترقي پسند تحریڪ جو اثر)This is another piece of work Agro sahib was undertaking during his last days. The book has been published by Sindhi Adabi Board. The book discusses the influence of progressive writer's movement of India on Sindhi literature. The book is very first kind of literary work on the subject.
6. Hinglaj mae chae (ھنگلاج ۾ چانھ) The book “Hinglaj mae chae” is a compilation of various travelogues that Mr. Agro wrote during his lifetime and were published at various places. It contains an account of Mr. Agro's travels to China, Iran, India, and Bangladesh. Book has been published by Institute of Sindhology, Jamshoro
7. Thia Kalb Qarar (ٿيا قلب قرار) This is the collection of miscellaneous articles published by Mr. Agro in his lifetime. The collection is also published posthumously. It includes articles on Seerat-e-Nabvi, history of Sindh, research articles, life sketches, translation work etc. Book has been published by the Institute of Sindhology, Jamshoro.
8. Sindh Mein Pakhein Jo Shikar (سنڌ ۾ پکین جو شڪار) A brief introduction of various birds of Sindh and a discussion on their hunting. The book has been published by SAB.
9. Sindhi Culture (سنڌي ڪلچر: پس منظر ۽ پيش منظ) The book is published by Sindh Culture department and is reproduction of series of articles Mr. Agro wrote in Daily Hilal-e-Pakistan back in 1980s. The book discusses the Sindhi culture in historical background of Indus civilization and influence of Islam on it.
10. Khatan Jo kitab (خطن جوڪتاب)The book consists of letters written to contemporary writers. There is a list of twenty personalities to whom letters have been written from early 1950s to 2009. Book is in process of compilation.
11. Bharat Mae Urdu (بھارت میں اردو) This is a compilation work of Mr. Agro and has been published by Pakistan Academy of Letters.
12. Qous e Qaza Kay Rang (قوس و قزاح کے رنگ) A collection of various articles of Ghulam Rabbani Agro written in Urdu. Some translated work from Sindhi to Urdu are also part of this book. The book is also being planned to be published sooner.
13. Sindhi Culture ((سندھی کلچر(اردو ترجمہ)The book Sindhi culture has been translated into Urdu and has been published by Sindh Culture Department.
14. American Short Stories Mr. Agro translated and published “American short stories” together with Mr. Sirajul Haq Memon. Book has been published by Sindhi Adabi Board, Jamshoro.
15. A Collection of Selected Writings of G R Agro A collection of various articles of Ghulam Rabbani Agro written in English is also being planned to be published.

=== Acknowledgement of literary works abroad ===
Agro's famous short stories have been acknowledged worldwide. His story "Bure hin Bhambhore Mae" was first translated into English as "The deluge", by Hashu Kewal Ramani. The story got international recognition and was subsequently translated into many languages such as German, Hindi, Tamil, Chinese, and Polish.

== Struggle against one unit and restoration of Sindhi language ==
Sindhi is one of the oldest languages of subcontinent with five thousands rich history. The first language Muslims (Arabs) came in contact with when they entered India in large numbers was Sindhi. Thus several Arab writers mention that Sindhi was the language of the people in al-Mansura, the capital of Sind. The Rajah of Alra called Mahraj, whose kingdom was situated between Kashmir and Punjab, requested Amir Abdullah bin Umar, the ruler of al-Mansura, to send him someone to translate the Quran into his language around AD 882. The language is called ‘Hindi’ by Arab historians (in this case the author of Ajaib ul Hind) who often failed to distinguish between the different languages of India and put them all under 22 Rahman the generic name of ‘Hindi.’ However, Syed Salman Nadwi, who calls this the first translation of the Quran into any Indian language suggests that this language might be Sindhi. Later, between 1020 and 1030 Al-Beruni visited India and wrote a book on it called "Kitab Ma-li al Hind " which was translated by Edward C Sachau as " Alberuni’s India" (1888). In this several alphabets of the Hindus are mentioned.

In recent history, Britishers provided a very strong footing and base to Sindhi language by declaring Sindhi as court language of Sindh province and played a vital role to develop Sindhi language. Britishers introduced the Sindhi Alphabets, developed the Sindhi medium schools and colleges and introduced Sindhi type writer and printing machines to compete with any other international language.

Soon after creation of Pakistan, Bengalis rose up and demanded their fair share in the government. Not only this, they also demanded to declare Bengali as one of the national languages together with Urdu. However, few political groups in West Pakistan wanted to curb these demands of Bengalis and therefore hatched a conspiracy to amalgamate the four provinces Sindh, Balochistan, NWFP and the Punjab as one unit. The conspirators had two-fold objective: To deprive the Bengalis of their right of majority (the Bengalis were 56 per cent of the population of Pakistan) and to plunder the lands of Sindh and the mineral resources of Balochistan. The three smaller provinces were therefore totally against one unit. Hence, force was used (as in East Pakistan) to achieve the objective. In Sindh, elected chief Minister and his cabinet was dismissed.

In this historical background, during one unit period, Sindhis were suppressed with force. Every step was taken to rob sindhis of their identity. To give the idea of gravity of situation, it is enough to say that word Sindh was intolerable for government to hear. They actually banned to use the word Sindh even in postal addresses. The names of the railway stations, government buildings and roads were written in Urdu script. Records and registers kept in Sindhi began to be reprinted in Urdu.

During one unit, every faction of the Sindhis played their role and raised their voice against the imposition of one unit. Among them were writers, students, politicians and social workers. Sindhi writers played a pivotal role and demonstrated a leading role during the struggle for the restoration of four provinces of Pakistan and restoration of status of Sindhi as an official language in province of Sindh. Some of prominent names who waged a war against Ayub Khan's Martial Law and against one unit were Muhammad Ibrahim Joyo, Ghulam Rabbani Agro, Shaikh Ayaz, Rasheed Bhatti, Tanveer Abbasi, and Sirajul Haq Memon etc. These writers and poets raised their voice through their writings and pressurized the Ayub government to restore the status of Sindhi language. Finally, Government of Ayub Khan had to succumb to these pressures and one unit was demolished.

== Awards and honors ==
Ghulam Rabbani Agro received a number of awards, shields and honors in recognition of his services to literature. He was awarded Tamgha-e-Imtiaz by President of Pakistan. He is also recipient of a shield awarded by Farooq Laghari, President of Pakistan.

Posthumously, many organizations have paid their tribute to Mr. Agro in many ways. Sindh museum Hyderabad, and Institute of Sindhiology, Jamshoro have established a gallery and a corner respectively. Furthermore, Government of Sindh, has named the Government degree college Kandiaro after Mr. Agro. The college is now known as Ghulam Rabbani Agro Degree College, Kandiaro. https://www.facebook.com/pages/Ghulam-Rabbani-Agro-Govt-Degree-College-Kandiaro/111755995607245?sk=info&tab=page_info

== Visits abroad ==
Ghulam Rabbani Agro visited many countries representing his country at various occasions. He visited China twice first as a member of the delegation and later as a leader of the delegation of writers. He also visited Iran twice. The first visit was on invitation of Iranian Government together with Nawab Noor Ahmed Khan Leghari. The second visit was as a member of the delegation sent to participate in the Imam Khumaini conference. Mr. Agro also visited India to represent Pakistan in a seminar organized for SAARC countries. He was also sent to Bangladesh along with Syed Zamir Jafferi to participate in the Asian Poetry Festival Dhaka, Bangladesh.

== See also ==
- Sindhi literature
- Gul Phul
- Encyclopedia Sindhiana entry
