= Abida Taherani =

Pakistani educationist

Dr Abida Taherani
- Died: 1 June 2016; London, England
- Resting place: Jamshoro, Sindh, Pakistan
- Education: University of Sindh (Masters in economics), Colorado State University (PhD in agricultural economics)
- Occupations: Teacher, educationist, scholar
- Years active: 1977–2016
- Children: 2
- Awards: Pride of Performance Award (2016)

Dr. Abida Taherani (died 1 June 2016) was a Pakistani educationist, scholar, and former vice chancellor at the University of Sindh. She was honored with the Pride of Performance Award in 2016.

== Biography ==
Rising from a well-educated family, Teherani graduated with a master's degree in economics from the University of Sindh and the London School of Economics. She later earned a Ph.D in agricultural economics from the Colorado State University in the United States in 1995.

She was appointed as an economics professor at the University of Sindh in 1977. Prior to her appointment as vice-chancellor on January 15, 2015, she had previously served as the head of the economics department, the Sindh Development Studies Center, and the faculty of social sciences.

As a research scholar, economics, agricultural economics, developmental economics, sustainable development, environment, gender, poverty studies, water resources, and the Indus delta were the subjects of her interests.

Teherani supervised 10 doctoral programs in various domains of competence, and she also oversaw nine other scholars as they were conducting PhD-level research, in addition to six others who were pursuing MS and M Phil degrees. She was associated with several organizations like the International Association of Agricultural Economists, the Pakistan Economic Council and Council of Social Scientists, the National Statistical Council, the Access to Financial Assistance Program of the State Bank, and the Task Force on Revival of the Sindh Economy.

Teherani died on 1 June 2016 in London. She had been suffering from breast cancer for the last few years. She was buried in the vicinity of Allama I.I. Kazi Mausoleum, Jamshoro.

== Research papers ==
- Demographic Features OF Coal Field Area OF District Therparkar, January 2021
- Coping with sexual harassment: the experiences of junior female student nurses and senior female nursing managers in Sindh Pakistan, December 2015
- Women's representation in the senate of Pakistan, December 2015
- Social and psychological impacts of private tuition on students and their families in Pakistan, December 2014
- Land use efficiency and managerial performance in the Left Bank Outfall Drain Project in Pakistan, Thesis (Ph. D.) at Colorado State University, 1995

== Awards and recognition ==
Year	Award	Category	Result	Presented by	Ref
2016	Pride of Performance Award	Education	Won	President of Pakistan	
