= Sindology =

Sindology may refer to:

- A misspelling of Sindhology, the study of the province of Sindh, Pakistan
- A misspelling of sindonology, the study of the Shroud of Turin
