= Muhammad Usman Diplai =

Pakistani scholar and educationist

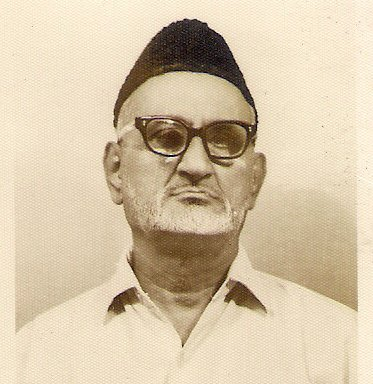
- Born: 13 June 1908; Diplo, Tharparkar District, Sindh, Pakistan
- Died: 8 February 1981 (aged 72)
- Other name: Diplai
- Occupations: Writer, Freedom Fighter
- Known for: A promotor of modern education
- Awards: Pride of Performance Award by the President of Pakistan in 2004

Muhammad Usman Diplai (Urdu: محمد عثمان ڈیپلائی), popularly known as Diplai (13 June 1908 – 8 February 1981), was a figure of Sindhi literature and journalism.

He was awarded the Pride of Performance for literature by the President of Pakistan General Pervez Musharraf on 23 March 2004.

== Early life and literary career ==
Muhammad Usman Diplai was born at Diplo, (Tharparkar District) to Mohammad Ali Diplai, in a middle-class family. As per family traditions, he had to engage himself in business. Due to unfavourable circumstances, he could not complete his formal education. In early life, he worked with some landlords (zamindars) of the area as a clerk, but continued reading newspapers and magazines. He also acquired proficiency in Gujarati, Hindi, Gurmukhi, and Urdu languages and a working knowledge of English and Persian. His works included a translation of the Quran in the Sindhi language.

He founded Islamia Press, Quran Press and the Islami Dar-ul-Ishaat, the Adar-i-Insanyat, and the Diplai Academy one after another shortly before the Second World War, at the historic town of Mirpurkhas. He then moved to Hyderabad in 1942 where he founded the monthly magazine Ibrat, which he sold in 1946, it then changed to publishing weekly and eventually daily. He was an essayist, journalist, publisher, distributor, and printer of the Sindhi language.

In 1923, he came across an issue of the Urdu weekly Munadi, published in Delhi by Khwaja Hassan Nizami which carried an article about the conquest of Sindh by the young warrior Muhammad Bin Qasim. Diplai wrote a letter in Urdu to the editor pinpointing certain historical inaccuracies in the write-up. Hassan Nizami was so impressed by the letter that he published it as an article. It proved a source of inspiration to Diplai and he started contributing to Munadi and Deen-o-Duniya (Urdu) journals regularly. Later, his Sindhi stories appeared in Sindhi monthlies such as Taraqqi and Ilmi Dunya.

== Awards and recognition ==
He was posthumously awarded the Pride of Performance for Literature by the President of Pakistan in 2004

== Death and legacy ==
Muhammad Usman Diplai died on 8 February 1981 at age 72.

On the 31st death anniversary of Muhammad Usman Diplai in 2012, many eminent scholars, writers and intellectuals paid tributes to him at an event held at Sindhi Language Authority auditorium including Rasool Bux Palijo who said that Diplai struggled for the promotion of education when Sindh was in the stranglehold of feudal lords and pirs. He added that Diplai had shown the way to modern education when Sindh was in desperate need for it.

Another scholar Fahmida Hussain noted that Diplai was among the few persons in the 20th century to bring about meaningful reforms in the field of education.

== Bibliography ==
- Qazi, Surriya Nasim, Muhammad Usman Diplai-His Personality and Impact of His Writings on the Social, Political and Literary Conditions of Sindh (2002, University of Sindh)
