= Ustad Bukhari =

Pakistani poet (1930-1992)

- اُستاد بُخارِي
- Born: Syed Ahmed Shah Bukhari; 16 January 1930; Dadu Sindh, British India
- Died: 9 October 1992 (aged 62); Karachi, Pakistan
- Occupations: Poet, Teacher
- Writing career
- Genre: Poetry
- Subjects: Sufism, Love, Togetherness
- Movement: Progressive

Ustad Bukhari (Sindhi: اُستاد بُخارِي) Urdu (استاد بخاری) (16 January 1930 – 9 October 1992), born "Punhal Shah", a name he later changed to Syed Ahmed Shah Bukhari, was a prominent progressive Sindhi-language poet of Sindh, Pakistan. His creative contributions in the field of poetry changed the thoughts of millions of people and he got recognition in all of Sindh and abroad. He was well known as the poet of the people and undoubtedly, he was, because he expressed his emotions in the language of common people. The Institute of Sindhology has opened a corner in its museum in his memory and honour.

== Education and services ==
After passing Sindhi Final in 1944, Bukhari was appointed as a teacher in the education department. He did training as teacher in Govt. Mithiani Training College from 1951 to 1952. He received degrees of Adeeb Sindhi, Adeeb Alim and Adeeb Fazil . He passed his master's degree in Sindhi literature from University of Sindh in 1964, and in 1967 he joined the Government College Larkana as Lecturer. He served at Govt. College Larkana, Sanghar, Sehwan and Dadu . He got promotion as assistant professor and he retired from services as Professor. Paying tribute to his services as teacher and poet, after his death, the Government of Sindh named the Government Boys Degree college Dadu as Ustad Bukhari Degree College Dadu.

== Books (published) ==
1. Geet Asaan ja Jeet Asaan ji(گيت اسانجا جيت اسانجي) (1971ع)
2. Hee Geet Gulabi Baran jaa (هي گيت گلابي ٻارن جا) (1980ع)
3. O'toon Jo'Toon (اوتون جوتون) (1985ع)
4. Kookan yaa Kaliyaan (ڪوڪڻ يا ڪلياڻ) (1986ع)
5. Sochoon Bhunkaa Wakaa (سوچون، ڀڻڪا، واڪا) (1990ع)
6. Lahar Lahar Daryaa (لهر لهر دريا) (1990ع)
7. Kaary Kakar heth (ڪاري ڪڪر هيٺ) (1991ع)
8. Dharti Sarti (ڌرتي سرتي) (1991ع)
9. Zindagi Zindagu (زندگي زندگي) (1992ع)
10. Na Kam nibrio na Gham nibrio (نه ڪم نبريو نه غم نبريو) (1993ع)
11. Justajoo La-Takanatu (جستجو لاتقنطو) (1993ع)
12. Maandi thee na Maarui (ماندي ٿيءُ نه مارئي) (1994ع)
13. Wilwilo aen wok (ولولو ۽ ووڪ) (1994ع)
14. Melaa Malhalaa (ميلا ملهالا) (1996ع)
15. Watan aen Wesaah (وطن ۽ ويساهه) (1997ع)
16. Guldasty men Geet (گلدستي ۾ گيت) (2007ع)
17. Bukhaari jaa Kat'aa (بخاريءَ جا قطعا) (2008ع)،
18. Per na Hatan poetry (پير نه هٽن پوئتي) (2007ع)
19. Dhoor Dard je dil ty (ڌوڙ دل تي درد جي) (2007ع)
20. Ghiryaa se charhiyaa (گهڙيا سي چڙهيا) (2007ع)
21. Hee Gajraa he gola (هي گجرا هي گولا) (1997ع)
22. Harai Hetch watan jaa (هڙئي هيج وطن جا) (1998ع)
23. Lahri Lahri men Lalaan (لهري لهري ۾ لالاڻ) (1998ع)
24. Gaae pio Jaagy pio (ڳائي پيو جاڳائي پيو) (1999ع) and
25. Tad tad tediyaan Galhyaan (تڙ تڙ تيڏيان ڳالهيان) (سرائڪي شاعري 2001ع)

== Death ==
Bukhari died on 9 October 1992 due to blood cancer in Jinnah Hospital, Karachi, and was buried on 10 October 1992 at Dadu.
