= Laats =

Family name

Laats is a surname. Notable people with the surname include:

- Johan Laats (born 1967), Belgian judoka
- Lauri Laats (born 1981), Estonian politician and entrepreneur
- Lia Laats (1926–2004), Estonian stage and film actress
- Philip Laats (born 1963), Belgian judoka

See also

- Heli Lääts (1932–2018), Estonian singer
- Laat, is a children's magazine in Sindhi published by Mehran Publication Hyderabad, Sindh
