= Madad Ali Sindhi =

Pakistani writer columnist and journalist

Federal Minister for Education, National Harmony, and Youth Affairs
- In office 17 August 2023 – 4 March 2024
- Preceded by: Rana Tanveer Hussain
- Succeeded by: Khalid Maqbool Siddiqui

Personal details
- Born: October 12, 1950 (age 75) Hyderabad, Sindh, Pakistan
- Profession: Writer, Columnist, Journalist
- Awards: Pride of Performance (2021)

Madad Ali Sindhi (Sindhi: مدد علي سنڌي , Urdu: مدد علی سندھی) is a Pakistani writer, columnist and journalist who belongs to Sindh, Pakistan. He served as the caretaker Federal Minister for Education, National Harmony, and Youth Affairs.

== Early life and education ==
Madad Ali Sindhi was born to Allah Bux Qureshi on 12 October 1950 in Hyderabad city of Sindh, Pakistan. According to encyclopedia Sindhiana by Sindhi Language Authority Hyderabad, he got primary education from Fatima primary school Hyderabad, Sindh. He did his matriculation from Govt. Boys school Hyderabad. He received degree of B.A from Sachal arts and commerce college Hyderabad. He passed M.A from university of Sindh, Jamshoro. He started writing from 1968 as well as took part in politics. He remained organizer of Hyderabad Sindh for Awami League of Sheikh Mujibur Rahman in 1969. He is member of board of governors body of Sindhi Language Authority.

== Books ==
- History of Sindh by Culture Department of Sindh Pakistan.
- Ancient Sindh
- Koonja bee kaee koonja.
- Duleh Darya Khan - The Forgotten Hero of Sindh by MIJTB Culture Department, Government of Sindh
- Cartography of Sindh Volume-I, Sindh Archives, Karachi

== Award ==
Writer Madad Ali Sindhi was rewarded with a presidential civil award pride of performance by Govt. Of Pakistan on 14 August 2021 regarding his rendered services in Sindhi literature.
