= Din Muhammad Wafai =

Pakistani writer

Din Muhammad Wafai دين محمد وفائي
- Born: 4 April 1894; Village Khathi، Taluka Garhi Yaseen, district Shikarpur, Sindh, Pakistan
- Died: 10 April 1950 (aged 56); Sukkur, Sindh
- Citizenship: Pakistani
- Occupations: Scholar, poet, journalist and historian
- Writing career
- Genres: Prose, Poetry

Din Muhammad Wafai ([Sindhi: مولانا دين محمد وفائي], 4 April 1894 – 10 April 1950) was a writer, poet and journalist of Sindhi language who was a member of the Khilafat Movement.

== Early life and education ==
Din Muhammad Wafai was born on 4 April 1894 in the village of Khathi (Sindhi: کٿي) of taluka Garhi Yaseen, district Shikarpur, Sindh, Pakistan.

His father, Khalifo Hakeem Gul Muhammad Bhatti, was a scholar and poet. He received early education from his father, who died when he was nine years old. He then learned Persian from Muhammad Alim and Arabic from Ghulam Umar of Sonu Jatoi and Ghulam Qasim of Garhi Yaseen.

== Career ==
He started his career as a journalist in 1916 from Ranipur, when he launched a monthly magazine Sahifa Qadria. He then launched magazine Alkashif in 1918. He joined the daily Al-Waheed in 1920 as an assistant editor.

He was influenced by Taj Mohammad Amroti, Allama Iqbal and Abdul Majid Sindhi. He launched monthly Tauhid from Karachi in 1923, and Alhizb newspaper in 1927.

He was appointed as an editor of daily Al-Waheed in 1930. He also served as an editor of the daily Azad. In 1940, he was selected as a member of the central advisory board for promotion of Sindhi literature and also a member of the Sindhi Dictionary Committee.

He was also member of the editorial board of the literary magazine Mehran published by the Sindhi Adabi Board. After the creation of Pakistan, in January 1949, Sindh government formed a committee to develop Sindhi course books, and Wafai was a member of that committee.

== Books ==
Din Muhammad Wafai authored more than 60 books.

These include:

- Aitqad Sahih: Mazhab Ahel-e-Hadith (Sindhi: اعتقاد صحيح: مذھب اھل حديث)
- Alham-e-Bari (7 volumes), (Sindhi: (ست جلد) الھام باري), Translation
- Alham-e- Barul Mubeen (Sindhi: الھام برالمبين), Translation
- Azkar-e-Hussain (Rad Sheeaa Yadgar-e-Hussain), (Sindhi: اذڪار حسين (رد شيعہ يادگار حسين))
- Farooque-e-Azam (Sindhi: فاروق اعظم رضيہ)
- Fatooh-ul-Ghaib (Sindhi: فتوح الغيب)
- Ghaus -e- Azam (Sindhi: غوث اعظم رحہ)
- Imdad-e-Yateema (Sindhi: امداد يتيمہ)
- Intkhab Sahih Bukhari (Sindhi: انتخاب صحيح بخاري)
- Hyder-e-Karar (Sindhi: حيدر ڪرار رضيہ)
- Islami Zindagi (Islamic Life, Sindhi: اسلامي زندگي), published in 1924.
- Khatoon-e-Jannat (Sindhi: خاتون جنت)
- ۡLutuf-ul-Latif (Sindhi: لطف الطيف), A study of Shah Jo Risalo
- َQurani Sadaquat (Sindhi: قرآني صداقت)
- Rahat-ul-Rooh Tazkirah Nooh (Sindhi: راحت الروح تذڪرہ نوح)
- Siddique Akbar (Sindhi: صديق اڪبر رضيہ)
- Syedna Usman (Sindhi: سيدنا عثمان رضيہ)
- Tareekh-e-Muhammadi (Sindhi: تاريخ محمدي صہ)
- Tazkirah Mashahir-e-Sindh, Part I, II & III (Sindhi: تذڪرہ مشاھير سنڌ), Biographies of saints of Sindh
- Tauheed-e-Islam (Sindhi: توحيد اسلام), Translation
- Yad-e-Janan (Sindhi: ياد جانان), Memories of Jan Muhammad Junejo and others in the Hijrat Movement
- Zindagia Jo Maqsad (Phalsafah Ilim-un-Nafs), (Sindhi: زندگيءَ جو مقصد (فلسفہ علم النفس))

== Death and legacy ==
Din Muhammad Wafai died on 10 April 1950 in Sukkur. He was buried in Waria Jo Tarr graveyard of Sukkur.

Din Muhammad Wafai was a teacher, journalist, writer, historian and an active member of Khilafat Movement mainly in the region of Sindh of British India and later in Pakistan.
