= Sindhi literature =

Literature in the Sindhi language

Sindhi literature (Sindhi: سنڌي ادب) is the collection of oral and written literature in the Sindhi language in prose (romantic tales and epic stories) and poetry (ghazals and nazm). Sindhi literature has developed over a thousand years.

According to historians Nabi Bux Baloch, Rasool Bux Palijo, and G. M. Syed, Sindhi influenced Hindi in the pre-Islamic era. After the advent of Islam in the eighth century, Arabic and Persian influenced the region's inhabitants and were official languages. Shah Abdul Latif Bhittai, Shah Abdul Karim Bulri, Shaikh Ayaz and Ustad Bukhari are notable Sindhi poets.

== History ==
=== Early period (712–1030) ===
Local Hindu rajas had ruled Sindh. In 712, the Arabs conquered the region. They did not speak Sindhi, but Sindhi writers and poets played a role in development of the Sindhi and Arabic languages. The Quran was translated into Sindhi, and Sindhi books were translated into Arabic. Sindhi qasida (odes) were written, and Sindhi books were used in religious schools. The Persian-language Sindh history Chach Nama was written at this time.

=== Soomra period (1030–1350) ===
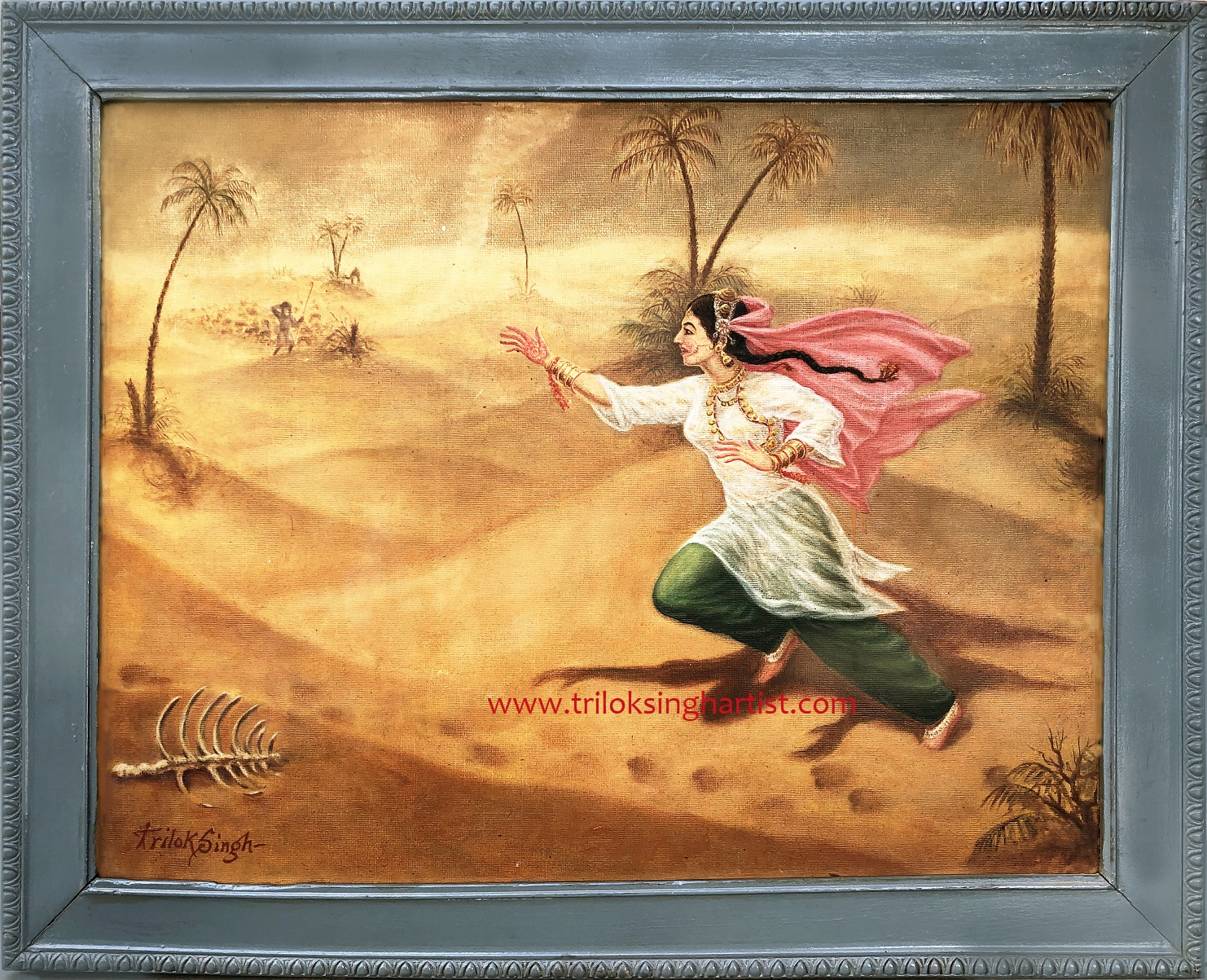
Sassi runs to Punhu in the Sassui Punnhun folktale.

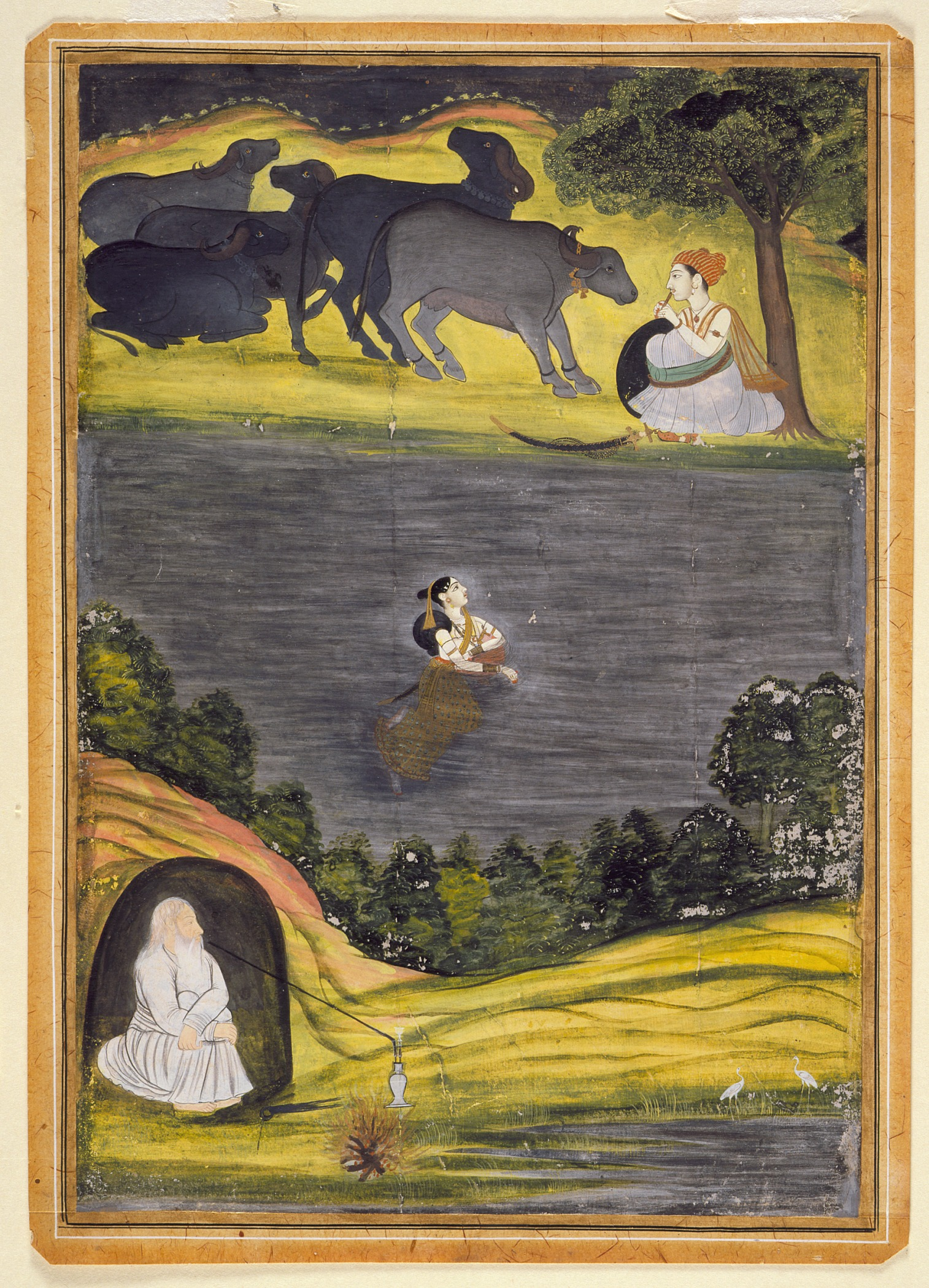
Sohni swims across the river to meet her beloved Mehar.

As the Arabs lost control of Sindh, Sindhi-speaking inhabitants became rulers. This period is known as the classical period of Sindhi literature, although Persian remained the administrative language and Arabic remained a religious language. The Soomra dynasty ruled Sindh for over three centuries. The Sindhi language expanded and new literary ideas were expressed in Gech (گيچ) and Gahi (ڳاھ).

This was a period of prosperity and Sindhi linguistic development; Sindhi was a source for Islamic preaching. Sindhi poetry and satire evolved.

=== Samma period (1350–1520) ===
The Samma had been allied with the Soomra, but Hameer (the last Soomra ruler) was defeated by the Samma ruler Jam Unar. Jam Unar became the ruler of Thatta. Although this period is considered fruitful for Sindhi literature, Persian remained the administrative language and Arabic the religious language. Sindh's borders reached Multan, Bahawalpur, Pasni, Kathiawar, Makran, Sibi, Kutch and Kalat and Thatta became centers of knowledge.

=== Mughal, Argon and Turkhan period (1521–1718) ===
Shah Beg Arghun's father, Amir Zulnun Arghun, ruled Qandar on behalf of Mirza Shah Hussain Baiqra. In 1507, after Amir Zulnun Arghun's murder, Shah Beg Arghun took control of Shal-e-Sabi, Kabul and Kandar-Chidi in Balochistan. Due to the weakness of Jam Feroz, Jam Salahuddin rebelled; this led to civil war. Shah Beg Arghun conquered Sindh in 1521.

Shah Beg Arghun died on 22 Sha'ban 928 AH (1522 AD), and Hakim Theo conquered the Saju region (as far as Multan) in 1526 AD. Humayun defeated Sher Shah Suri, and died in 1541. Akbar was born the following year in Umerkot.

Mah Rahat went to Iran and died on 10 July 1543. In 1554, Shah Hassan Arghun died. Sindh was divided between two families; northern Sindh came under the control of Sultan Mahmud Bakri, who was governor of Bakr during the reign of Shah Hasan Arghun.

When Amir Mirza Isa Tarkhan took control of Henahin Sanad, the Tarkhan dynasty began. Ghazi Beg was appointed the nawab of Nani, and Sindh became part of the Mughal Empire. During Mughal rule, subahdars were appointed in Yernani, Bakr and Siwat. Under Muhammad Shah, Mughal power weakened. The Kalhora dynasty became stronger in Sindh, and established their own government.

Due to the unrest, the scholars of Sindh migrated to Arabia and Gujarat. There was chaos in Central Asia, which led to the emigration of intellectuals to Sindh. After them, the church of knowledge was established as a seminary. Persian was the Arghuns' mother tongue, and poetry was written in Persian and Urdu.

After the fall of the Samma dynasty, three noble families ruled Sindh for about two centuries. The Sindhi poet Shah Abdul Karim Bulri, forefather of poet Shah Abdul Latif Bhittai, was born.

=== Kalhora and Talpur dynasties ===
Shah Abdul Latif Bhittai (1689–1752) lived during the Kalhora dynasty, a significant period in the history of Sindhi literature. The Sindhi language was standardized at this time, and classical Sindhi poetry flourished with Shah Latif's work. Shah Latif invented a variant of the tanbur, a musical instrument played when poetry is sung. His compilation, Shah Jo Risalo, includes "Sassi Punnun" and "Umar Marvi".

Shah Latif traveled to remote regions of Sindh, studying its people and their attachment to its land, culture, music, art and crafts. He described Sindh and its people in folk tales, expressing ideas about the universal brotherhood of mankind, patriotism, the struggle against injustice and tyranny, and the beauty of human existence. Also a musician, Shah Latif composed fifteen svaras (melodies). Each line of his poetry is sung on a specific svara. Khawaja Muhammad Zaman of Luari, whose poetry appears in Abdul Rahim Garhori's Shara Abyat Sindhi, was another notable Kalhora Sufi poet.

Sachal Sarmast, Sami and Khalifo Nabi Bux Laghari were celebrated poets of the Talpur period (1783–1843). Khalifo Nabi Bux was an epic poet known for his depictions of patriotism and the art of war. Rohal, Bedil, Bekas, Syed Misri Shah, Hammal Faqir, Sufi Dalpat, Syed Sabit Ali Shah, Khair Shah, Fateh Faqir and Manthar Faqir Rajar were other noteworthy poets of the pre- and early British era.

=== Kalhora period (1718–1782) ===
During the Mughal Empire, the Kalhora clan became strong and assisted the Mughal rulers. Yar Muhammad Kalhoro executed the poet Shah Abdul Karim Bulri, and became the first ruler of the Kalhora dynasty. Shah Abdul Latif Bhittai flourished at this time, which is considered a golden age of Sindhi literature because the rulers were Sindhi.

=== Talpur period (1782–1843) ===
This period was the foundation of Sindhi prose. After the Talpur defeated the Kalhora, they ruled Sindh for about 150 years. The British defeated the untrained Talpur army.

=== British Raj (1843–1947) ===
The British conquered Sindh in 1843, and Sindhi replaced Persian as the official language and medium of education. A committee of scholars discussed the alphabet, and Perso-Arabic script was adopted and implemented. In addition to textbooks, poetry and prose books began to be published.

=== After independence ===
Pakistan was founded in 1947, and Sindhi literature began to explore economic and social topics.

== Modern era ==
Modern Sindhi literature began with the region's 1843 conquest by the British, when the printing press was introduced. Magazines and newspapers popularized Sindhi literature, and books were translated from a number of European languages (particularly English). Mirza Kalich Beg wrote more than four hundred works (including poetry, novels, short stories and essays) about science, history, economics and politics during the last two decades of the nineteenth century and the first two decades of the twentieth. Thousands of books were published at that time, and Hakeem Fateh Mohammad Sehwani, Kauromal Khilnani, Dayaram Gidumal, Lalchand Amardinomal, Bheruamal Advani, Hotchand Molchand Gurbuxani, Jethmal Parsram, Miran Mohammad Shah, and Maulana Din Muhammad Wafai were pioneers of modern Sindhi literature.

In India, the Sahitya Akademi Award for Sindhi literature has been given annually since 1959. After World War I, Sindhi literature was affected by the October Revolution and other socioeconomic changes. Literature became more objective and less romantic, and progressivism was an influence.

The struggle for freedom from the British gathered momentum, sparking interest in Sindh's history and cultural heritage. Scholars such as Allama I. I. Kazi, his wife Elsa Kazi, Rasool Bux Palijo, G. M. Syed, Umer Bin Mohammad Daudpota, Pir Ali Muhammad Shah Rashidi, Pir Husamuddin Shah Rashidi, Din Muhammad Wafai, Jairamdas Daulatram, Hashmat Kevalramani, Bherumal Meharchand Advani, Muhammad Ibrahim Joyo, and Allah Dad Bohyo published works on history and culture.

Poets such as Mir Abdul Hussain Sangi pioneered poetry in Persian meter.

The novel and short story became the main prose forms, and hundreds of each were translated from European languages to the languages of Pakistan. World War II saw the emergence of novelists and short-story writers such as Gobind Malhi, Sundri Uttamchandani, Popati Hiranandani, Moti Prakash, Ghulam Rabbani Agro, Jamal Abro, Shaikh Ayaz, Amar Jaleel, Naseem Kharal, Agha Saleem, Tariq Ashraf, Shaukat Shoro, and Madad Ali Sindhi. Sindhi drama has also flourished, and Aziz Kingrani has written scores of plays.

Young writers have experimented with new forms of prose and poetry. Free verse, sonnets and ballads have been written, in addition to classical forms such as kafi, bayt, and geet.

Notable Sindh poets are Makhdoom Muhammad Zaman Talib-ul-Mola, Ustad Bukhari, Shaikh Ayaz, Darya Khan Rind, Ameen Faheem, and Imdad Hussaini. Mubarak Ali Lashari is a literary critic and the author of Kuthyas Kawejan.

Noor-ud-din Sarki and Abdul Ghafoor Ansari founded Sindhi Adabi Sangat, an organization of Sindhi-language writers originally centered in Karachi, in 1952. The organization has chapters elsewhere in Pakistan and overseas.

=== Children's literature ===
Gul Phul is a popular children's magazine which was edited by author Akbar Jiskani. Laat, a magazine published by Mehran Publications, was founded by Altaf Malkani and Zulfiqar Ali Bhatti (author of the spy novel Khofnaak Saazish). The Sindhi Adabi Board has published books for children. Waskaro, a magazine which began publication in 1990, contains short stories, poems and articles. The Sindhi Language Authority has also published books for children.

== Genres ==
The earliest references to Sindhi literature are by Arab historians; Sindhi was among the earliest Eastern languages into which the Quran was translated in the eighth or ninth century AD. Evidence exists that Sindhi poets recited verses before Muslim caliphs ruled in Baghdad. Secular treatises were written in Sindhi about astronomy, medicine, and history during the eighth and ninth centuries. Pir Nooruddin, an Ismaili missionary who lived in Sindh in 1079, wrote Sufi poetry in Sindhi. His verses, known as ginans, are an example of early Sindhi poetry. Because Pir Nooruddin was a Sufi, his verses describe mysticism and religion.

Pir Shams Sabzwari Multani, Pir Shahabuddin and Pir Sadardin also wrote Sindhi poetry, and some verses by Baba Farid Ganj Shakar were written in Sindhi. Pir Sadruddin was another major Sufi Sindhi poet, composing verse in Sindhi's Lari and Katchi dialects. He also wrote in Punjabi, Seraiki, Hindi, and Gujarati. Sadruddin modified Sindhi script, which was commonly used by the lohana caste of Sindh Hindus who embraced Islam as a result of his teaching; he called them Khuwajas or Khojas.

During the Samma dynasty (1351–1521), Sindh produced notable scholars and poets; the Sammas were some of Sindh's original inhabitants. Mamui Faqirs' (Seven Sages) riddles in verse are associated with this period. Ishaq Ahingar (Blacksmith) was also a notable contemporary poet. Sufi scholar and poet Qazi Qadan (died 1551) composed dohas and Sortha poetry, and was a landmark of Sindhi literature. Shah Abdul Karim Bulri, Shah Lutufullah Qadri, Shah Inayat Rizvi, and Makhdoom Nuh of Hala are among other authors of Sindhi mystic, romantic and epic poetry.

=== Romantic tales ===
- Sassui Punnhun: this romantic story dates back to Soomra rule. Sasui is from Bhambore, and Phunoo is from Makran; they marry. A number of Sindhi poets told this story, particularly Shah Abdul Latif Bhittai.
- Umar Marvi: this, the second well-known romantic story of that period, was widely sung by Sindhi poets. Umar, the Soomra ruler of Umarkot, falls in love with Marvi.
- Momal Rano: this story is about the Soomra ruler Hameer. Rano, Hameer's son-in-law, falls in love with a Gujrati girl.
- Sohni Mehar: the fourth romantic story of this period
- Lilan Chanesar: also from the Soomra period
- Sorath Rai Diyach: another story from the Soomra period
- Noori Jam Tamachi: this semi-romantic dates to when the Soommra government was in Lar.

=== Religious poetry ===
During the Soomra era, Islamic missionaries arrived in Sindh and ginans (religious poetry) became popular. The most popular ginans were written by Pir Shihab al-Din and his son, Pir Sadardin, who developed a 40-character Sindhi alphabet.

== See also ==
- Sindhology
- List of Sindhi-language poets
- Noori Jam Tamachi
- Pakistani literature
- Doha (Indian literature)
- Sindh Literature Festival
