= Agha Saleem =

Pakistani writer, novelist, playwright and poet

- آغا سليم
- Born: Agha Khalid Saleem; 7 April 1935; Shikarpur, Bombay Presidency, British India
- Died: 12 April 2016 (aged 81); Karachi, Sindh, Pakistan
- Education: Government College University Hyderabad
- Occupations: Writer; Novelist; Playwright; Poet
- Writing career
- Language: Sindhi, Urdu, English (Note: He published primarily in Sindhi and Urdu languages and very few work in English language)
- Years active: 1958–2016
- Subjects: Politics, literature
- Notable awards: Pride of Performance; Latif Award

Agha Saleem (born Agha Khalid Saleem; 7 April 1935 – 12 April 2016) was a Pakistani writer, novelist, playwright and poet. His work was primarily focused on fiction writing, novels, dramas, regional films and travel literature. He is also credited for translating Sindhi language books into Urdu and English languages, including Shah Abdul Latif Bhittai's book Risalo.

He was born as Agha Khalid Saleem in Shikarpur, Sindh to a Pakhtun family. He did his primary schooling from a school in his hometown. In 1948, he went to Hyderabad and graduated from a public college called Government College Kali Mori (now Government College University Hyderabad) in 1958. He had two sons, including Agha Jamshed Khan and Agha Khudadad Khan and a daughter Agha Gul Zareen Khan.

== Literary career ==
Agha started his career around 1957 to 1958. His first short story titled Ahh Ae Zalim Samaj (O, you cruel society) was published in 1958 when he graduated from the college. As a playwright, he started writing radio plays with Radio Pakistan after completing his education. His first novel titled Ondhahi Dharti Roshan Hath'a (Dark Land, Bright Hands) was published in 1972. The novel he wrote depicted Indus Valley civilisation of Mohenjo-daro which primarily revolves around historical events of the civilisation till the dominion of Pakistan created two new sovereign states India and Pakistan followed by the split of Indian subcontinent. His prominent novels included Oondahi Dharti, Hamma Oast and Roshan Hath. He was inspired by the political movement against One Unit, a geopolitical programme launched by the government of Pakistan and was actively involved in contentious politics-writings and pro-democracy movement in an attempt for mass mobilisation.

His first radio play titled Wapsi and Dodo Chanesar are recognized among the prominent ones. Later, he wrote more plays, including Roop Bahroop, Gul Chhino Girnar Jo, and Gulan Jahera Ghava. His poetic series titled Pann Chhan Aeen Chand was published in 1986.

As an editor, he also worked for two local newspapers of that time such as Jaago and Daily Sach.

=== Work ===
Key
†	Remarks denote a short description of the work where available.

#	Title	Year	Type/Credited as	Remarks
1	Ahh Ae Zalim Samaj (O, you cruel society)	1958	Short story	—N/a
2	Chand Ja Tamanayee	1967	Short story	—N/a
3	Ondhahi Dharti Roshan Hath'a (Dark Land, Bright Hands)	1972	Novel	It depicts Indus Valley civilisation of Mohenjo-daro
4	Dharti Roshan Aahe	1985	Short story	—N/a
5	Gunah	1985	Short story	—N/a
6	Annpooro Insaan	1985	Short story	—N/a
7	Roshni Ji Talash	1985	Novelette	—N/a
8	Oondahee Dharti	1985	Novel	—N/a
9	Roshan Hath	1985	Novel	—N/a
10	Hama-i-Oost	1985	Novel	—N/a
11	Hamma Oast	—N/a	Novel	—N/a
12	Falsafay Ji Kahani	1985	Translator	—N/a
13	Shah Jo Risalo	1985	Translator	—N/a
14	Pann Chhan Aeen Chand	1986	Poem	—N/a
14	Wapsi	—N/a	Radio play	—N/a
16	Roop Bahroop	—N/a	Radio play	—N/a
17	Gulan Jahera Ghava	—N/a	Radio play	—N/a
18	Gul Chhino Girnar Jo	—N/a	Radio play	—N/a
19	Dodo Chanesar	—N/a	Radio play	—N/a
20	Melody of Clouds	—N/a	—N/a	—N/a

== Arrests ==
In 1978 he was arrested and later prosecuted under martial law for disrespecting the country's founder. The case was later dismissed after Qazi Muhammad Akbar, a Pakistani politician helped him get out of prison.

== Awards ==
Year	Award	Nominated work	Result
2005	Pride of Performance	For contributing to Sindhi literature	Won
—N/a	Latif Award (2)	—N/a	Won

== Death ==
Agha was suffering from heart complications and was under medical treatment at a hospital. He died of a heart stroke on 12 April 2016 in Karachi, Pakistan.
