= Sehrish Nagar =

Main town

Sehrish Nagar (Sindhi:سحرش نگر) is a main town along the bank of the Indus River. It is very close to Qasimabad, towards west of Hyderabad Sindh, Pakistan. This town is included in Qasimabad Taluka of Hyderabad District, Sindh.
