= Naseem Kharal =

Pakistani writer

Naseem Ahmed Kharal (Sindhi: نسيم کرل) (June 29, 1939 – July 14, 1978) was a Sindhi short story writer. He was born on June 29, 1939, in Kharalabad, Khairpur District of British India, what subsequently became Pakistan.

== Personal life ==
Son of Abdul Kareem Kharal from District Khairpur, who was a Kharal Jatt landlord, Naseem was the eldest of seven children, and had four brothers and two sisters. He married his cousin, a daughter of Abdul Raheem Kharal, Chief Justice of Khairpur Mir's, and has six children.

He gained a Bachelor of Arts and a law degree and became a landlord. Although a qualified lawyer, he never practiced law and stuck to his roots of agriculture. His work includes Pahrein Murad, Kafir, 34 dar and his published books are Shabnam Shabnam Kanwal Kanwal (1966), Akhyoon Arsiyoon (1968), Khirnda Khatinhar, Chotihoon Dar (1973) and Dummy.

He died on July 14, 1978, in Khairpur.

== See also ==
- Sindhi literature
