= Jaffrey =

Jaffrey may refer to:

== Places ==
- Jaffrey, New Hampshire, a town in the United States
  - Jaffrey (CDP), New Hampshire, the main village in the town of Jaffrey

== People ==
- Sir Thomas Jaffrey 1st Baronet (1861–1953), Scottish actuary and a prominent citizen of Aberdeen(British origin)

=== Jaffrey ===
Jaffrey is a name associated with descendants of Ja'far al-Sadiq who was a descendant of Muhammad through his daughter Fatimah bint Muhammad and Ali ibn Abu Talib.

- Jagdeep Jaffrey (1939-2020), Indian film actor and comedian
- Javed Jaffrey (b. 1963), Indian film actor and comedian
- Madhur Jaffrey (b. 1933), Indian film actress and food writer
- Saeed Jaffrey (1929–2015), Indian film actor

== See also ==
- Jaffray (disambiguation)
