= Sehba Sarwar =

Pakistani writer

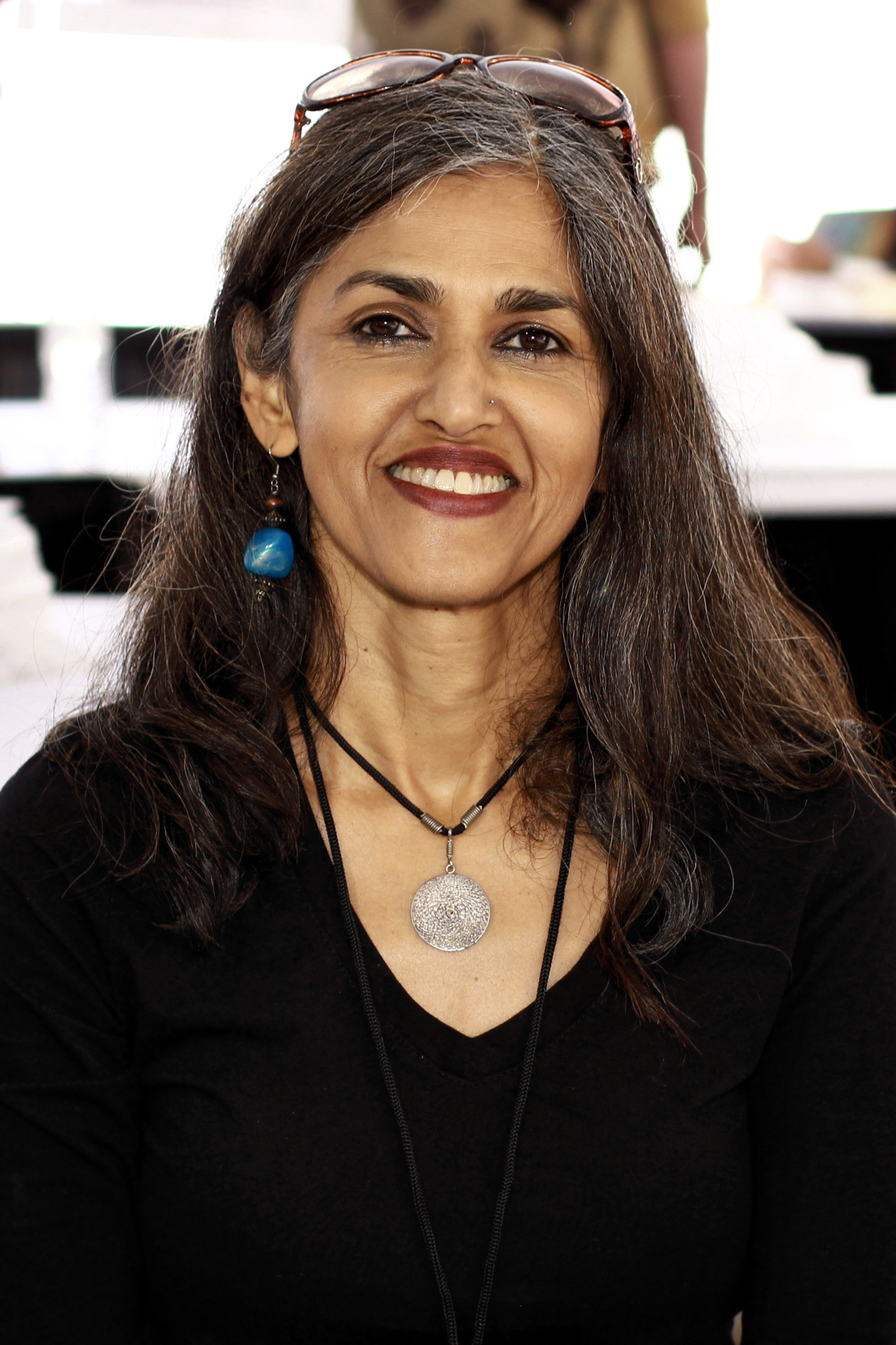
Sarwar at the 2019 Texas Book Festival

Sehba Sarwar is the author of Black Wings (First Edition Alhamra Books 2004; Second edition, Veliz Books 2019).

== Biography ==
She grew up in Karachi, Pakistan and has published essays, poems and short stories in newspapers and magazines in India, Pakistan, the US and Canada. She also produces experimental videos and art installations.

Sarwar received her B.A. in English from Mount Holyoke College in 1986, and a graduate degree from the University of Texas, Austin in Public Affairs. She has worked as a journalist in Pakistan and as an educator in Houston before founding Voices Breaking Boundaries in 2000. She currently resides in California and serves as Altadena Poet Laureate for Community Events (2024-2026).

== Works ==
- "Recovering My Voice". GOOD, Livable Houston Magazine, 2000.
- Black Wings Alhamra Publishing, 2004
- "Karachi's Winter Days." New York Times, March 30, 2008.
- "Devouring Mangoes With Gusto." Dawn, August 14, 2011.
- "Bangladesh’s Unresolved History of Independence." Creative Time Reports, December 16, 2013.
- "Lives: A Delicate Matter in the Examination Room." New York Times, June 12, 2016.
- On Belonging. Menil Collection, 3 February, 2018.
- "On Belonging & Other Poems." Desi Writers Lounge, 2019.
- Black Wings - second edition. Veliz Books (2019), ISBN 9781949776003
- "Railway Track."Houston Noir - editor Gwendolyn Zepeda. Akashic Books (2019), ISBN 9781617757068
- "Addressing Youth Violence: Foster Communities That Break Isolation." L.A. Parent, September 1, 2022.
- "Refuelled: 48 hours." Aleph Review, April 18, 2023.
