= Jean-Yves Jaffray =

French mathematician and economist

Academic background
- Doctoral advisor: Jean Ville
- Website: Information at IDEAS / RePEc

Jean-Yves Jaffray (1939–2009) was a French mathematician and economist who made influential contributions in the fields of decision theory and mathematical statistics. He pioneered methods in decision theory such as linear utility theory for belief functions, bridging the gap between expected utility and the maximin rule by using subjective probability to encompass belief functions.
