= Syed Irfan Ali Shah =

Pakistani politician, writer and agriculturalis

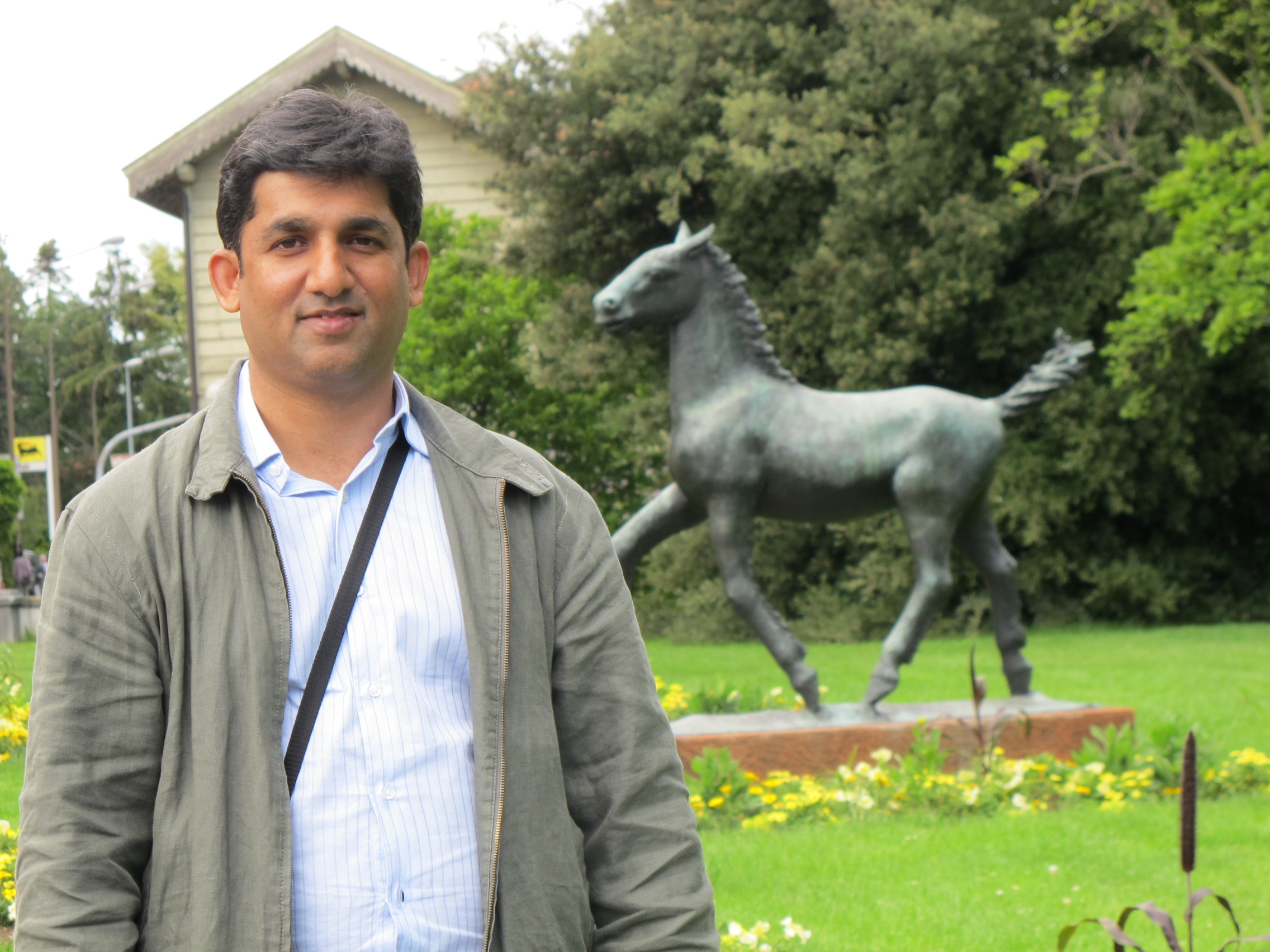

Syed Irfan Ali Shah is a Pakistani politician, writer and agriculturalist.

He is a son of Syed Ghulam haider Shah, has an MBA and is a member of the Provincial Assembly of the Sindh affiliated with the Pakistan Peoples Party Parliamentarians.
