= Jamal Abro =

Sindhi writer

Jamal-ud-din Abro
- Born: May 2, 1924; Sangeen (Dadu District), Sindh Bombay Presidency British India, Pakistan
- Died: June 30, 2004 (aged 80); Karachi

Jamaluddin Abro, (Sindhi: جمال الدين ابڙو – Urdu: جمال الدین ابڑو; 2 May 1924 – 30 June 2004, Larkana, Pakistan), also known as Jamal Abro, was a Sindhi writer. He was born in Sangi, a small village in Mehar Taluka, then part of Dadu District.

== Life ==
Abro studied in a number of schools in Larkana and Hyderabad. He passed his matriculation from Bombay University in 1941 and later became a student at the Bahauddin College in Junagadh, Gujarat. In 1944, he went to Bengal and worked as a volunteer at relief camps for famine-affected areas. He also worked as an activist with the Khaksar Movement.

He took a degree in law in 1948 from Shahani Law College in Larkana and started working as a lawyer. Abro entered public service in 1952 and was posted as a sub-judge in a number of places in Sindh. In the latter part of his career, he served as a judge in the labor court and as a secretary to the Provincial Assembly of Sindh. He remained active on the literary front with the Sindhi Adabi Sangat (the organization of Sindhi writers with members all over Sindh).

== Work ==
Abro's first short story was published in the year 1949 and was followed by some others. Pishu Pasha aroused much debate and discussion, and this was the name given to the collection of nearly a dozen short stories published in 1959. This nearly brought Jamal Abro's work to a close as a short story writer and was followed by a long gap of silence. An invitation to contribute a story for a university magazine being edited by Shaikh Ayaz, (the leading Sindhi poet who was a close friend) led him to write his first story in fifteen years. This story focused on karokari (the ritual murder of a woman accused of immorality), written as only the author of "Pirani" could have. It was followed by a story, written during the Writers' Conference, Islamabad, in the days of General Zia ul-Haq's Martial Law; it describes the conference as a setting for an encounter with the angel of death.
