= Zulfiqar Ali Bhatti (writer) =

Engineer turned educationist, poet and academic author from Sindh, Pakistan

Zulfiqar Ali Bhatti is an engineer turned educationist, poet and academic author from Sindh, Pakistan. He has written over 200 books including several textbooks in Sindhi, Urdu, and English.

Bhatti received his engineering degree from Sindh Agriculture University and his Masters in English Literature from University of Sindh. His poems and articles have appeared in different newspapers.

Some of his books have also featured at exhibitions. His major publications include Unshed Tears, Yadgar Dictionary of Computer Terms, Fundamentals of English Grammar, and Khofnak Sazish, a children's novel.
