= Indian Institute of Sindhology =

Indian research center

- Established: 1989
- Director: Sahib Bijani
- Location: Adipur, Gujarat, India
- Acronym: IIS
- Website: www.sindhology.org

The Indian Institute of Sindhology (I.I.S.) is a center for advanced studies and research in the fields related to Sindhi language, literature, education, art and culture. Its primary aim is to preserve and promote the cultural heritage of Sindhi Community and ensure its continuity by disseminating it in the younger generation.

The organization is already in the realm of dissemination of the old tenures of the Sindhi Cultural ethos. It has its own active school which operates in a separate wing of the organization's building. Plus to keep a record of the Sindhi Language there are notable books of yesteryear as well a host of audio recordings that the team at the organization has been assembling from different parts of India. The in-house library that acts up as a museum also; looks to play that much vital role in fulfilling the expectations that the organization had its genesis in.

The library in Indian Institute of Sindhology holds thousands of Sindhi Books, many of them are rare ones, on various topics. All the Sindhi magazines published in India and abroad are also displayed and collected there.
