= Sindhi Adabi Board =

State-sponsored literary institute in Sindh

- Formation: December 1951; 74 years ago
- Type: Educational and literary institute
- Headquarters: Jamshoro, Sindh, Pakistan
- Location: University of Sindh, Jamshoro, Pakistan
- Region served: Sindh
- Official language: Sindhi
- Chairman: Makhdoom Saeed-u-Zaman 'Atif'
- Main organ: Board of Governors
- Parent organisation: Ministry of Education, Government of Sindh
- Budget: Rs. 120 million
- Staff: 80
- Website: sindhiadabiboard.org

Sindhi Adabi Board is a government sponsored institution in Sindh, Pakistan for the promotion of Sindhi literature. It was established in 1955 in Jamshoro, Sindh. It is under the Education Department of the Government of Sindh.

== Activities ==
The organization has published Sindhi folklore, poetry, lexicography, archaeology and original literary works. These works have included anthologies of poetry works of Shah Abdul Latif Bhittai, Sachal Sarmast, Chen Rai Sami, Khalifo Nabi Bux Laghari, Miyoon Shah Inayat, Hamal Khan Laghari, Talib-ul-Mola and other mystic poets of Sindh.

The Board has published translations of selected works, manuscripts and other writings from world literature into the Sindhi language.

== Creation of the Board ==
The Federal Advisory Board was created in 1940 to fill the need for an organisation which could initiate, supervise and promote the publication of material in Sindhi language. In 1950, a more powerful executive committee was constituted, and in March 1955 the Sindhi Adabi Board was brought into being.

Muhammad Ibrahim Joyo served as the first secretary of the Board. The Board was registered with the Assistant Registrar of the Joint Stock Committee in Khairpur.

=== Chairman ===
Makhdoom Jamil uz Zaman was the previous chairman from 4 June 2010 to 2011. He quit the Chairmanship due to his failure in resolving the appointment of the secretary of the board.

==== Present Chairman ====
As per Sindh Government Notification present chairman is Makhdoom Saeed-uz-Zaman

=== Present Secretary ===
- Allah Ditto Waghio (A.D, Vighio) since July 1, 2011.

== Chronological list of the chairmen of the board ==
- Mohammad Ayub Khuhro (Chief Minister Sindh), December 1951 – March 1955
- Allah Baksh Sarshar Uqaili, March 1955-September 1961
- Niaz Ahmed Commissioner Hyderabad Sindh, September 1961-November 1961
- Makhdoom Mohammad Zaman Talib-ul-Mola, November 1961-July 1977
- Allama Ghulam Mustafa Qasmi, October 1977-January 1989
- Makhdoom Mohammad Zaman Talib-ul-mola, January 1989-April 1992
- Abdul Jabbar Junejo, March 1993-October 1994
- Hussain Shah Rashidi, October 1994-November 1996
- Abdul Hameed Akhoond (Acting), December 1996
- Muhammad Ibrahim Joyo, December 1996-July 2002
- Irfanullah Khan Marwat (Minister of Education), September 2003-June 2004
- Mazhar-ul-Haq Siddiqi (Acting), June 2004-July 2004
- Hamida Khuhro (Minister of Education), July 2004-June 2006
- Madad Ali Sindhi (Press Secretary to Chief Minister), June 2006–present

== Founder ==
The Sindhi Adabi Board was founded 1951 and its founder was of national leader G. M. Syed who was then provincial education minister, constituted the Central Advisory Board for Sindhi Literature in August 1940 and appointed Miran Muhammad Shah as its first chairman.

== Translated books published in Sindhi ==
- Eastwick, Dry Leaves from Young Egypt, 1973

== See also ==
- Sindhi literature
- Institute of Sindhology
