= Gul Phul =

Gul Phul (Sindhi گل ڦل) is a Sindhi-language children's magazine published by the Sindhi Adabi Board, in Pakistan.

== History and profile ==
Gul Phul was started in 1959 and is the first and oldest children's magazine in Sindhi. The magazine is based in Hyderabad. Its first editor was Ghulam Rabbani Agro. It contains short stories, articles, mathematics, poems, jokes, interviews, and other things of interest to children. In February 2016 the editors of the magazine reported that it had not been published for the last five months due to lack of funds by the Sindhi Adabi Board.
