= Institute of Sindhology =

Research institution in Sindh, Pakistan

- Type: Research institute
- Founded: 1962
- Headquarters: Jamshoro, Pakistan
- Area served: Research on history, society, culture, and literature of Sindh
- Key people: Nabi Bux Khan Baloch, Muhammad Hanif Siddiqui, Pir Hassam-ud-Din Rashidi, Ghulam Ali Allana [[Muhammad Qasim Maka]] saeed ahmed mangi
- Products: Books & art on Sindhology
- Services: Library, museum and music gallery
- Owner: University of Sindh

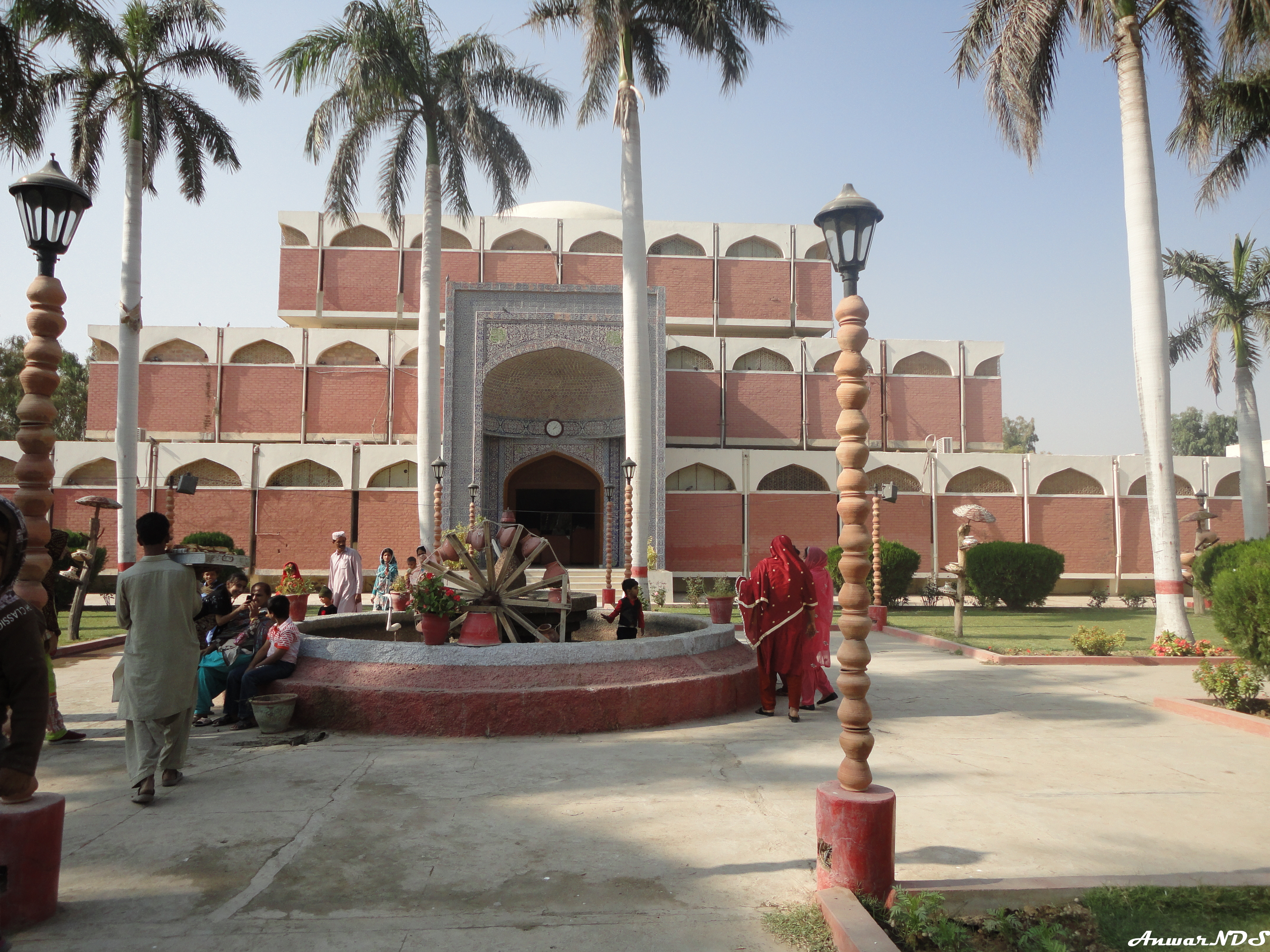
Institute of Sindhology, Jamshoro

Institute of Sindhology (Sindhi: سنڌولوجي) is a resource for knowledge of the Sindh region in present-day Pakistan.

== History ==
The history of the institute goes back to the establishment of the Sindhi Academy in 1962 by the University of Sindh. This was during the period of the One Unit Scheme which saw the Sindhi language displaced by Urdu in official discourse, with a consequent revitalisation of Sindhi nationalism. The desire to promote a cohesive Sindhi identity, in opposition to the monolithic West Pakistan province, spread through a student and academic population which had significantly increased in number and it led to several defining events at the University of Sindh. As a part of a socio-political movement there was a desire to research, preserve, promote and create Sindhi culture in language, literature, film and art. Much of this was underpinned by the myth of origin, propagated by researchers, that there was a recognisable and continuous Sindhi culture stretching over 5000 years from Mohenjo-Daro. The myth included that the Sindhi language was the progenitor of Sanskrit; Sindhi researchers routinely based the starting point of their work on the Indus Valley Civilisation.

In 1964, the name of the Sindhi Academy was changed to the Institute of Sindhology, probably to give the research subject a gloss that accorded it academic status similar to those of Egyptology or at least Indology.

The institute was provided with a small room at the old campus of Sindh University in Hyderabad. On 10 December 1972 the foundation stone of the new building was laid just off the Super Highway in Jamshoro, adjacent to Indus river. The three-storey building, located 12 kilometres (7.5 mi) from Hyderabad, was inaugurated in 1978. The construction is an amalgamation of the Islamic and Buddhist architectures. Internally, the building is decorated with local Hala tile-work, with two arms accommodating the Research Library and Administration Block. The central dome houses the Anthropological Research Centre (Museum), art gallery, film and photographic sections and audio-visual section.

In 1987, an extension was built in celebration of the institute's Silver Jubilee to house the bookshop facilities. In 2015, an international children’s films festival was held in Sindhology.

It was decided in 2002 to change the aims of the institute such that its main focus was on publishing. A news report in 2015 suggested numerous significant issues regarding the governance, purpose and actions of the institute.

== Research ==
The first major initiative to bring the subject to international attention was a series of surveys to identify the sites of major anthropological and archaeological research across the province, carried out in cooperation with the Smithsonian Institution between 1967-71. There were also cooperations with UNESCO to explore the Sindhology aspects of the major Indus valley Civilization sites across Sindh.

== Museum ==
Within the institute, the Anthropological Research Center and Sindh Arts Gallery is responsible for the maintenance of the museum. The centre provides attractions both for research scholars and general public. Artifacts on display in the museum represent the history and demography of the region. The collections contain archaeological material, wood-work, thread-work, metal-work, leather-work, pottery, jewellery, coins, armaments, photographs, and paintings that have been collected since the 1970s.

=== Music gallery ===
The ethno-musical gallery comprises sections on performing arts, sounds, and films. Sindhi music research and preservation an integral part of the regional cultural heritage.

The special unit of the institute visits remote villages, recording the various items of Sindhi music, folklore, folk tales and tunes played on local musical instruments. The collection has been gradually growing, and is made available on tapes and cassettes .

== Library ==
The institute has a research library with many corners named after prominent Sindhi scholars. The library archives and documents the regional heritage. The work started with compilation and publication of catalogues, bibliographies, directories and periodical literature. This resulted in the development of a directory of Sindhi writers; a source book on prominent personalities of Sindh; and, a bibliography of Sindhi books. The library archives have served as primary sources for many of the prominent publications on Sindhi culture.

== Publications ==
More than 185 books have been published by the Institute, in Sindhi, English, Urdu, Arabic and Punjabi languages. There are also two bi-annual journals published in English and Sindhi languages under the titles of Sindhological Studies and Sindhi Adab (Sindhi literature) respectively. Some of the major publications are:

- Sindhi lekhkan–ji Directory - 1974, (A directory of the writers of Sindhi Language).
- Chapial Sindhi Kitaban–ji Bibliography 1947-1973 - 1976. (A bibliography of Sindhi Books published during 1947-1973).
- Qalmi Nuskhan-jo-Tashree Catalogue - 1980, (Catalogue of Manuscripts available in research library of the Institute).
- Chapial Sindhi Kitaban–ji-Bibliography 1973-1979, 1980 (A Bibliography of Sindhi Books published during 1973-1979).
- Newsletter of the Institute of Sindhology (Activities of the Institute).

== See also ==
- Indian Institute of Sindhology
- Sindhi Adabi Board
- Sindhi Language Authority
- Sindhi-language media in Pakistan
