= Jamshoro =

City in Sindh, Pakistan

Jamshoro: ڄام شورو; جامشورو
- Town Council
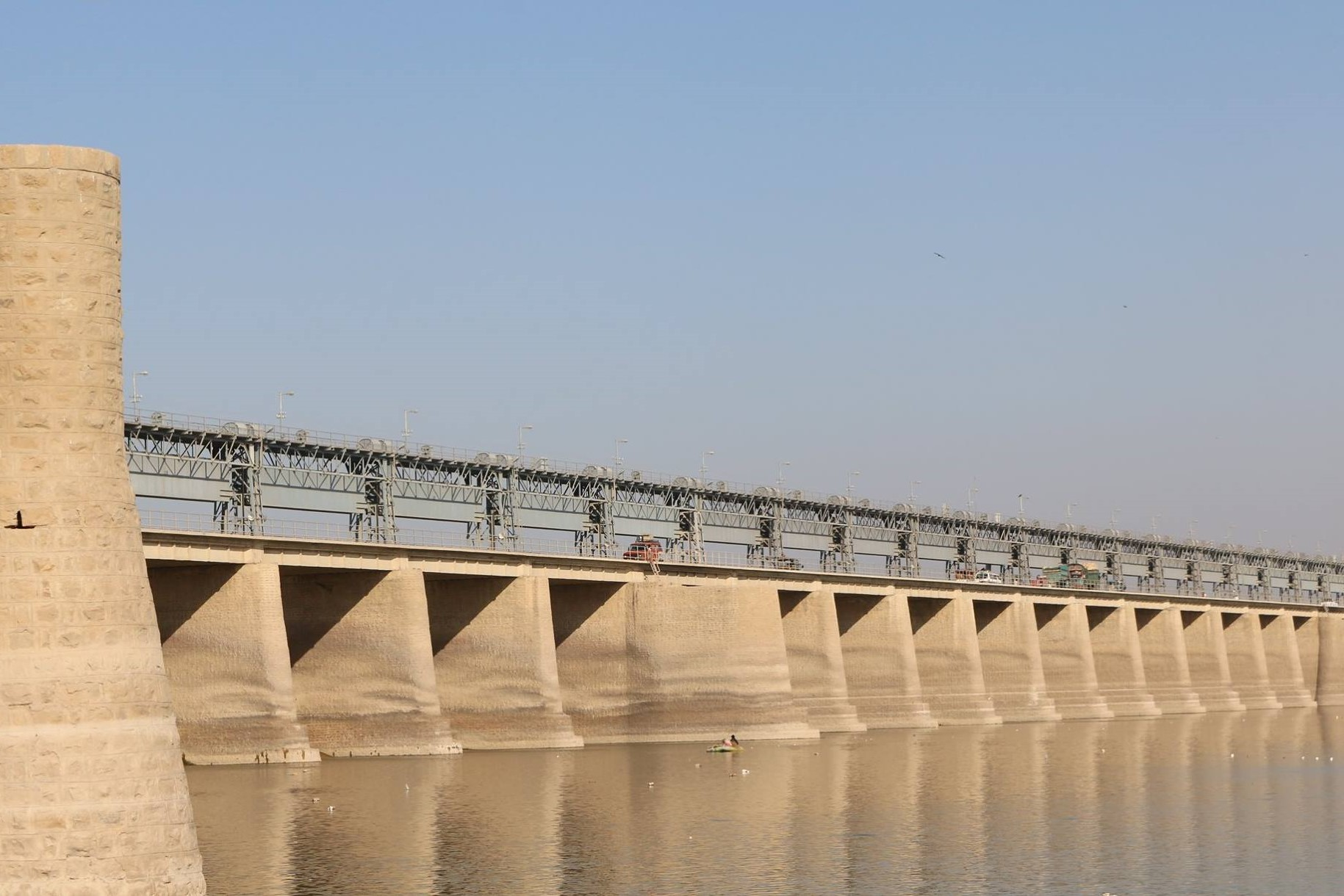
- Kotri Barrage

- Location within Sindh Location within Pakistan
- Coordinates: 25.4244°N 68.2811°E
- Country: Pakistan
- Province: Sindh
- Division: Hyderabad
- District: Jamshoro

Government
  - Type: Town Committee
  - Chairman: Bilal Qadir Shoro
  - Vice-Chairman: Alamdar Hussain Shah

Population (2023)
  - City: 88,190
  - Rank: 146th in Pakistan
- Time zone: UTC+5 (PST)
- Number of towns: 1

Jamshoro (Sindhi: ڄام شورو, Urdu: جامشورو) is a city and the capital of Jamshoro District, in Sindh, Pakistan. It is on the right bank of the Indus River, approximately 18 km (11 mi) northwest of Hyderabad and 150 km (93 mi) northeast of the provincial capital of Sindh, Karachi.

This city is popularly known as Education City. Four major universities of Sindh are located in the vicinity of this city.

== History ==
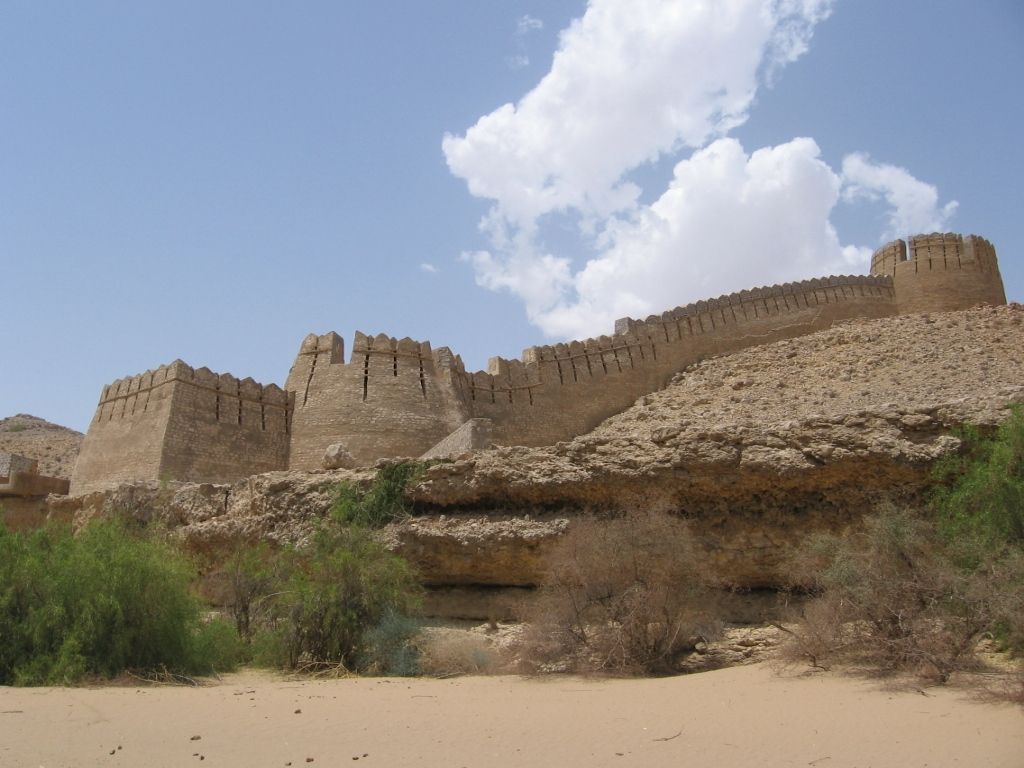
The wall has semi-circular bastions at intervals.

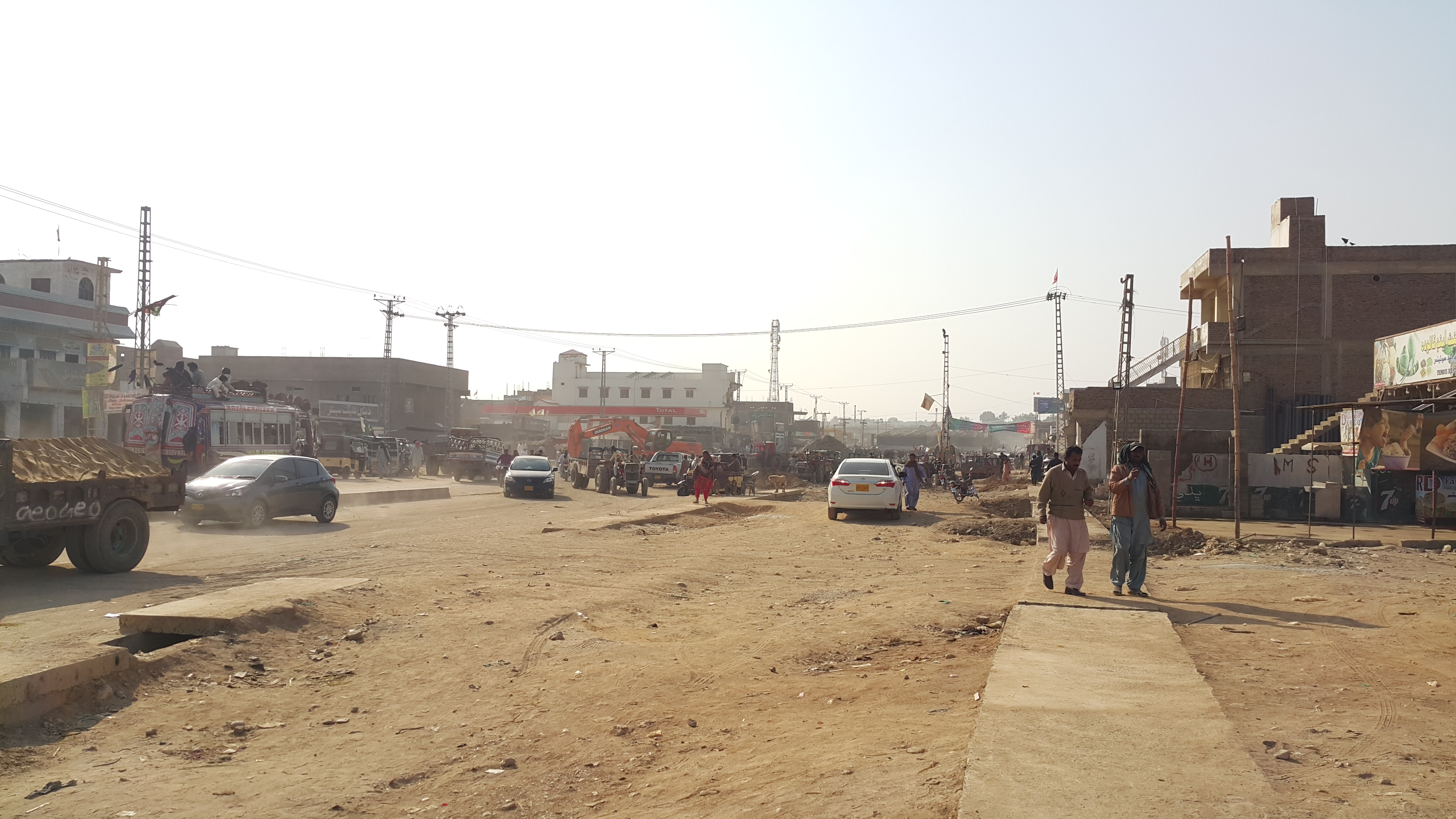
Jamshoro Phatak

Ranikot Fort is a historical fort near Sann, Jamshoro District, Sindh, Pakistan. Ranikot Fort is also known as the Great Wall of Sindh and is believed to be the world's largest fort with a circumference of approximately 26 kilometres (16 mi). Since 1993, it has been on the tentative list of UNESCO World Heritage Sites.

Archaeologists point to the 17th century as its time of first construction but now Sindh archaeologists agree that some of the present structure was reconstructed by Mir Karam Ali Talpur and his brother Mir Murad Ali Talpur in 1812 at a cost of 1.2 million rupees (Sindh Gazetteer, 677).

=== Universities ===
- University of Sindh
- Mehran University of Engineering and Technology
- Liaquat University of Medical and Health Sciences
- University of Art and Culture

=== Schools and colleges ===
- Cadet College Petaro
- Pak Turk International School & College Jamshoro
- The City School Jamshoro campus
- The Educators Branch Jamshoro
- Rockford Cambridge School Branch Jamshoro
- Pioneers School and college jamshoro campus

== Location ==
Jamshoro, is situated on the right bank of the Indus River at south-west position of Province of Sindh sloping from direction North-east to south-west and is about 18 kilometers from Hyderabad and at a distance of 150 kilometers from Karachi.

== Education ==
Jamshoro City is known for its universities, There are about 4 major universities of Sindh located in this city including

- Mehran University of Engineering and Technology,
- Liaquat University of Medical and Health Sciences
- University of Sindh
- Allah Bux Soomro University of Arts and Design
- Cadet College Petaro

These universities have made jamshoro city a key city for Education.

== Demographics ==
Population

Historical population
Year	Pop.	±% p.a.
2017	32,768	—
2023	88,190	+17.94%

According to the 2023 census, Jamshoro city has a population of 88,190. Roughly, 95% of the Population of the city consists of migrants from various parts of Sindh who migrated to the town in around 1948-2001 and to a lesser extent from 2002 to 2014 decades. Therefore, the city holds a number of diverse Sindhi clans and ethnic groups mainly from Jamshoro District, Dadu District, Sukkur District, Larkana District, Khairpur District, Umarkot District, Matiari District, Nawabshah District, Shikarpur District, Tharparker, Naushahro Feroze District, Badin District and Jacobabad District. Religions

Religion in Jamshoro
Religion	Percent
Islam	98.84%
Hinduism	1.15%
Christianity	0.01%

Jamshoro is predominantly Muslim with a small Hindu minority.

Languages

First Languages of Jamshoro city in (2023 Pakistani census)
1. Sindhi (92.0%)
2. Pashto (2.80%)
3. Urdu (2.30%)
4. others (2.70%)

The city is predominantly Sindhi with a substantial community of Pathans, and Baloch people. Small communities of Brahuis, Punjabis, and to a lesser extent Muhajir people are also present.

== See also ==
- Hyderabad, Sindh
