= University of Sindh =

Public university in Jamshoro, Sindh

Coordinates: 25.4216°N 68.2633°E

- Other name: Sindh University
- Motto: Seek knowledge from cradle to grave
- Type: Public University
- Established: 1947
- Affiliations: Higher Education Commission of Pakistan
- Chancellor: Governor of Sindh
- President: Shoaib Ahmed Soomro
- Vice-Chancellor: Prof. Dr. Fateh Muhammad Marri
- Students: 32,450
- Location: Jamshoro, Sindh, Pakistan
- Campus: 1250 acres
- Colours: Blue, Green, Black
- Nickname: Sindh University
- Website: www.usindh.edu.pk

The University of Sindh (Urdu: جامعہ سندھ; Sindhi: سنڌ يونيورسٽي; informally known as Sindh University) is a public research university located in the city of Jamshoro, in the Sindh province of Pakistan. It is one of the oldest universities in Pakistan and was certified by ISO in 2015.

Founded in 1947 in Karachi, the university was relocated to Hyderabad in 1951, where it began to function as a full-fledged teaching university. The university is associated with four colleges of law and various other colleges. Sindh University is noted for its research in literature, natural sciences, philosophy, and Sindhology.

== Recognized university ==
In 2018, the university was ranked eighth in "General Category" by the Higher Education Commission of Pakistan. The university is on a 2,300-acre (or 13 km^{2}) campus on the foothills of Jamshoro.

This university is a member of the Association of Commonwealth Universities of the United Kingdom.

== History ==
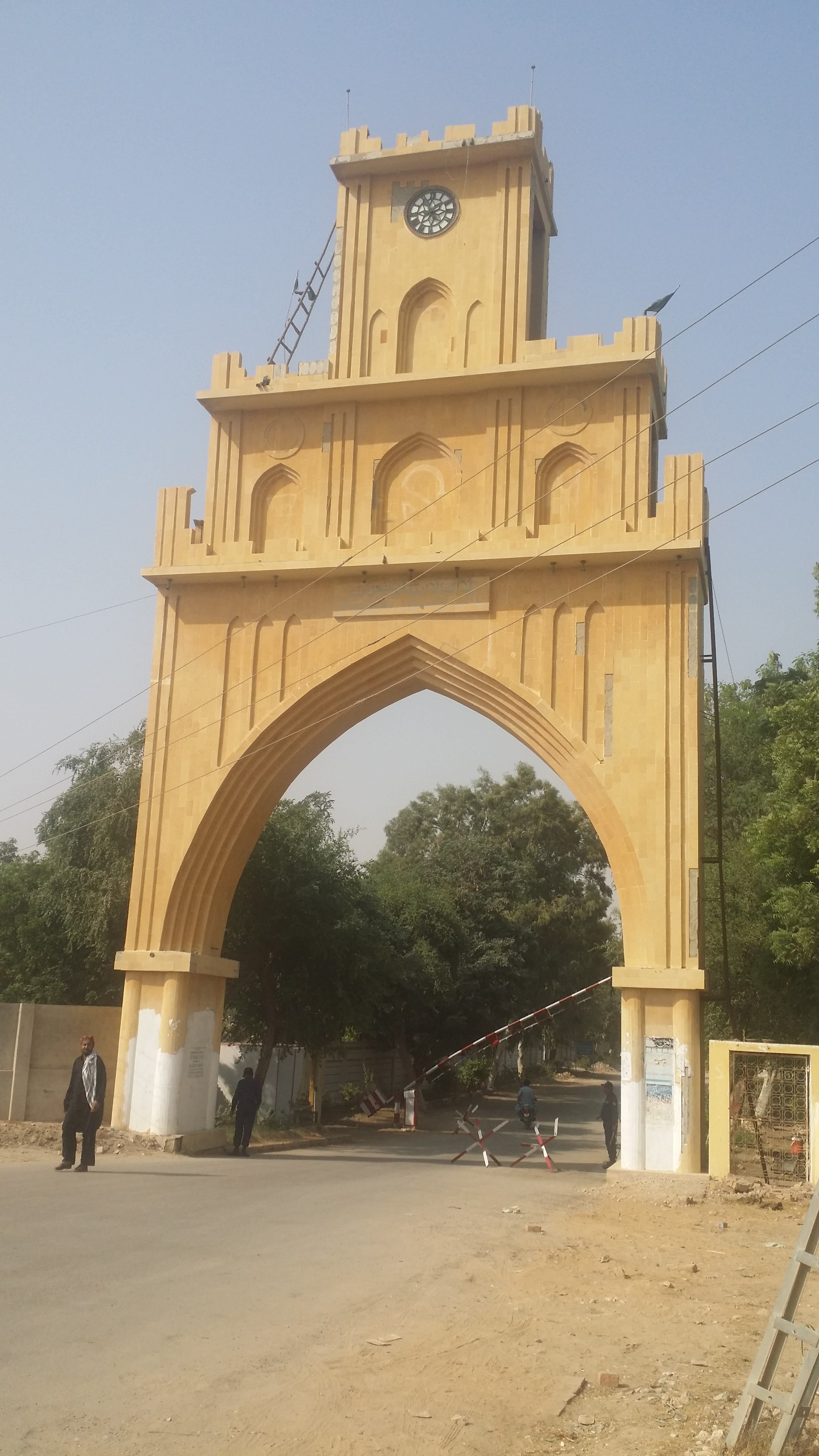
Gate of the University of Sindh

The work on establishing a university in the province of Sindh was started when Sindh was still part of British India. Due to efforts of Muhammad Ayub Khuhro and Hugh Dow, a Sindh University Committee was formed after passing of resolution named, Sindh Government Resolution, No. 607-B. /40 in June 1940.

After Pakistan gained independence in 1947, the only functioning university in the newly founded nation was the University of Punjab, which served the developed parts of the Punjab province. The Sindh province came under the academic purview of the University of Bombay, which had become a part of India.

A formal academic centre was therefore needed for Sindh and under Constitutional Act 27, titled University of Sindh, a resolution was passed by the provincial Legislative Assembly which founded the new university in Karachi, the national capital at the time. The act would later be revised in 1961 and several other times in the years to come. The 1972 revision allowed for the greater autonomy and representation of faculty that the university currently enjoys.

From independence in 1947 until 1955, Hyderabad was declared as the capital of Sindh and University operations were relocated from Karachi to Hyderabad in 1951, where it formally began to function as a teaching institution striving to fulfil its charter and its mission to disseminate knowledge.

The first department established at the university was the Department of Education, later renamed the Faculty of Education. The departments of basic science disciplines, as well as other departments of Humanities and Social Sciences, were added in the mid-1950s. With the sudden departmentalised growth of the university's organisational structure, a better equipped campus was desired. A new campus was established in 1955 in Jamshoro, 15 km from Hyderabad, on the right bank of the Indus River. This new campus was named after Allama Imdad Ali Imam Ali Kazi, former vice-chancellor of the university, as a tribute to his legacy as an esteemed scholar. Before Jamshoro was selected for the establishment of Sindh University, it was desolate and sparse but was deemed more suitable than Hyderabad, which lacked sufficient space to satisfy the university's ambitious expansion programs.

== Organisation ==
Sindh University is administered from its central campus at Jamshoro. It is a collegiate university, encompassing four legal colleges and 74 undergraduate and post-graduate colleges in the vicinity of Hyderabad and elsewhere in Sindh. Located near the Mehran University of Engineering and Technology, and Liaquat University of Medical and Health Sciences, Jamshoro is the largest university city in Pakistan.

=== Campuses ===
The university has two main campuses (1 and 2) and seven other campuses:

1. Allama I.I. Kazi Campus in Jamshoro
2. Elsa Kazi Campus in Hyderabad, named after Allama I.I. Kazi's wife
3. Sindh University, Lar Campus at Badin
4. Mohtarma Benazir Bhutto Shaheed Campus, Dadu
5. Sindh University, Naushahro Feroze Campus
6. Sindh University, Thatta Campus
7. Sindh University, Thar Campus ^{(proposed)}

=== Campuses to Full Fleged University ===
1. Shah Abdul Latif University (Khairpur Campus) 1986
2. University of Sufism and Modern Sciences (Bhitshah Campus) 2011
3. University of Larkano (Larkana Campus) 2023
4. University of Mirpurkhas (Mirpurkhas Campus) 2023

=== Administration ===
The university's central administration, headed by the vice chancellor, is located in central Jamshoro. The campus comprises seven faculties: those of arts, pharmacy, education, Islamic studies, social sciences, natural sciences, and commerce and business administration. Each faculty is overseen by a dean appointed by the vice chancellor. Each faculty is housed in its own building. Colleges affiliated with the university primarily enforce curricular requirements and host examinations for degree-awarding status.

=== Teaching and degrees ===
Academic faculties of the university offer courses which culminate in undergraduate bachelor's, bachelor's honours (an extra year added to the bachelor's course) and postgraduate master's degrees and provide research guidance for the MPhil and PhD programmes. The teaching and research under the faculties of natural sciences, social sciences, arts, education, Islamic studies, commerce and business administration are directly imparted by the university.

Each faculty is headed by a dean, appointed by the vice-chancellor for three years. The university's teaching departments, institutes and centres offer programmes culminating in a four-year bachelor's (honours) degree in general and basic disciplines under arts and humanities studies, while a four-year bachelor's degree is offered under the faculty of natural sciences. The degrees have been designated accordingly indicating various disciplines, e.g., for Computer Science, BSc(CS) and Information Technology BSc(IT), etc.

The master's degree programmes are usually over one year after a bachelor's (honours) degree and over two years after other bachelor's degrees. The latter programmes are conducted through affiliated colleges under the jurisdiction of the university. The teaching under the faculty of law is conducted through the affiliated professional law colleges.

Degree programs with evening classes were introduced in 2002 and include master's degree courses in English and information technology disciplines such as e-commerce and multimedia technology. Many teaching departments offer a one-year postgraduate diploma as well as short-term certifications. Some of the degree colleges in the private sector that are affiliated with the university offer three-year bachelor's honours and master's degree programmes.

=== Developments and facilities ===
The development programmes initiated in 1959 have gradually borne fruit. Though still under construction, about 20 teaching blocks housing 39 institutes, departments and centres have been constructed. Five student residential halls now provide accommodation for about 1800 students.

Sporting facilities include the Hyder Bux Jatoi Pavilion constructed to provide indoor gaming facilities, a track ground for athletics and a sports grounds. The Fatima Jinah Gymnasium provides game and sport facilities exclusively for women. The Institute of Sindhology building, depicting the cultural heritage of Sindh, adorns the entrance to the campus from the national highway leading to Karachi. The imposing central library building, named after Allama I.I. Kazi, serves as a landmark.

The residences for faculty and staff house roughly a third of the university's employees. The university intends to expand the faculty residences and provide accommodation for 200 more employees. Formerly deserted patches of hilly tract have now been converted into tree lined roads and green pasture. The location of Mehran University, sharing the site with the Sindh University and the Liaquat University of Medical and Health Sciences college and hospital complex in the neighbourhood substantially aided in the development of this land into a university town.

The university is accessible via the national highway (N5) at the Hyderabad bypass, about 150 km from Karachi and 15 to 18 km from Hyderabad. It has hosted international conferences, symposiums and seminars on science and education and on specialized scientific themes. Inter-university sports competitions and annual sports gatherings have become regular features. The museum and art galleries of the Institute of Sindhology attract many visitors from other parts of Pakistan and the world.

=== Research and collaboration ===
The university has established links with the following leading universities of the United Kingdom to promote research and encourage faculty development.

1. University of Durham
2. University of Manchester
3. University of Sussex
4. University of Essex
5. University of Leicester
6. University of Nottingham

== Alumni ==
- Manzoor Mengal, Islamic scholar
- Gul Muhammad Khan Jakhrani, politician
- Raja Parvaiz Ashraf, former prime minister of Pakistan
- Abida Taherani, former vice chancellor of the university
