= Matiari (disambiguation) =

Matiari is a city in Sindh, Pakistan.

Matiari may also refer to:

- Matiari District, an administrative unit of Sindh, Pakistan
- Matiari tehsil, in Matiari District, Pakistan
- Matiari, Nadia, a census town in Nadia district, West Bengal, India

== See also ==
- Matiaria, a village in Bihar, India
- Mateare, a municipality in Nicaragua
