= Makhdoom Jamiluzaman =

Pakistani politician

- مخدوم جمیل الزمان

Member of the National Assembly of Pakistan
- Incumbent
- Assumed office 29 February 2024
- Constituency: NA-216 Matiari
- In office 13 August 2018 – 10 August 2023
- Constituency: NA-223 (Matiari)

Member of the Provincial Assembly of Sindh
- In office 2013–2018
- In office 2002–2008
- In office 1997–1999

Personal details
- Born: Hala, Hyderabad District, Sindh, Pakistan
- Party: PPP (2018-present)
- Children: Makhdoom Mehboob Zaman (son)
- Parent: Makhdoom Muhammad Amin Fahim (father)
- Relatives: Makhdoom Zaman (grand-father); Makhdoom Saeeduz Zaman (uncle)
- Occupation: Politician

Makhdoom Jamiluzaman (Sindhi: مخدوم جميل الزمان;Urdu: مخدوم جميل الزمان) is a Pakistani politician from Hala, Matiari District, Sindh, belonging to the Pakistan Peoples Party Parliamentarians. He was a member of the National Assembly of Pakistan. He became the spiritual leader of Sarwari Jamaat after the death of his father, Makhdoom Muhammad Amin Fahim, and was appointed the 19th caretaker of the Dargah Ghous ul Haq Hazrat Makhdoom Sarwar Nooh A.r.

== Education and political career ==
Jamil uz Zaman achieved a Master of Arts degree. He started his political activities in 1981. He was minister for inter-provincial co-ordination and chairman of the Sindhi Adabi board. Jamil uz Zaman served as the member of the Provincial Assembly of Sindh from 1997 to 2002 and 2002 to 2007. He was also the chairman of Talib-ul-Moula Academy, Standing Committee and Sindhi Adabi Board as a member of board of governors of the Institute of Sindhology at University of Sindh and board of governors at Sindhi Adabi Board.

He was elected to the National Assembly of Pakistan as a candidate of Pakistan People's Party (PPP) from NA-223 Matiari in the 2018 Pakistani general election. He received 109,960 votes and defeated Makhdoom Fazal Hussain Qureshi, a candidate of the Grand Democratic Alliance (GDA).

He was re-elected to the National Assembly as a candidate of PPP form NA-216 Matiari in the 2024 Pakistani general election. He received 124,536 votes and defeated Bashir Ahmed, a candidate of Pakistan Muslim League (N) (PML(N)).

== Literary contributions ==
- Mulakat (poetry)
- Subuhi (collection of poems)
- Uttar Luga Auo Pireen (poems)
- Mohabat Pai Man Main (poems / divan)
- Sindh ji Waqiati Tarikh (570 A.D to 1990 A.D) (chronological history)
- Tazkara-e-Makhdooman-e-Hala (history of the Makdooms of Hala)
- Ant-a-Mehboobi (collection of poems)
- Rooh-Ruchandiyon (poetry)
- Kafia Kosh (dictionary, under print)
