= Hala =

Hala may refer to:

== People ==
- Hala (given name), a female given name (including a list of people and fictional characters with the name)
- David Hala (born 1989), Australian Rugby League player
- Hāla (fl. 20-24), Indian king of the Satavahana dynasty
- Hala Bashi, Uyghur Muslim general of the Ming dynasty and its Hongwu Emperor
- Jiří Hála (born 1972), Czech ice hockey player
- Martin Hála (born 1992), Czech footballer
- Mzimasi Hala, South African politician

== Places ==
- Al Hala, a neighbourhood in Muharraq, Bahrain, also known as Halat Bu Maher
- Hala (Pakistan) railway station, a railway station in Hala, Sindh, Pakistan
- Hala railway station, a railway station in Inner Mongolia
- Hala, Sindh, a city in Sindh, Pakistan
- Hala Taluka, an administrative subdivision of Matiari District, Sindh, Pakistan
- Hala, Syria
- Hala (King George Island), a plateau in the Antarctic

== Arts, entertainment, and media ==
- Hala (film), a 2019 film
- Hala, homeworld of an alien race known as the Kree in the Marvel Comics universe
- Hala the Accuser, a character from Marvel Comics
- Hala (song), a 2022 single by Don Xhoni and Era Istrefi
- "Hala Hala (Hearts Awakened, Live Alive)", a song by Ateez

== Other uses ==
- Al-Hala SC, a football club based in Muharraq, Bahrain
- Ala (demon), a demon in Serbian and Bulgarian mythology
- Hala (spider), a genus of spider
- Pandanus tectorius, a tree and its eponymous edible fruit
- Hala (taxi), a taxi e-hailing service

== See also ==
- Halas (disambiguation)
- Halla (disambiguation)
