= PS-56 Matiari-I =

Constituency of the Provincial Assembly of Sindh, Pakistan

- Constituency for the Provincial Assembly of Sindh
- Region: Saeedabad Tehsil and Hala Tehsil (partly) including Hala city of Matiari District
- Electorate: 217,011

Current constituency
- Member: Vacant
- Created from: PS-43 Hyderabad-I (2002-2018); PS-58 Matiari-I (2018-2023)

PS-56 Matiari-I (پی ایس-56، مٹیاری-1) is a constituency of the Provincial Assembly of Sindh.

== General elections 2024 ==
Provincial election 2024: PS-56 Matiari-I
Party	Candidate	Votes	%	±%
PPP	Makhdoom Mehboob Zaman	72,178	62.54	
PML(N)	Naseer Ahmed	35,525	30.78	
PMML	Aqeel Ahmed	2,628	2.28	
Others	Others (six candidates)	5,080	4.40	
Turnout		118,860	54.77	
Total valid votes		115,411	97.10	
Rejected ballots		3,449	2.90	
Majority		36,653	31.76	
Registered electors		217,011		
PPP hold				

== General elections 2018 ==
Provincial election 2018: PS-58 Matiari-I
Party	Candidate	Votes	%	±%
PPP	Makhdoom Mehboob Zaman	56,829	59.81	
GDA	Naseer Ahmed	34,648	36.47	
Independent	Hazoor Bux	1,568	1.65	
Independent	Syed Farman Ali Shah	363	0.38	
PPP(SB)	Gul Sher	351	0.37	
PML(N)	Yasir Ahmed Shah	276	0.29	
Independent	Sachal Shah	230	0.24	
Independent	Makhdoom Shahzad Ali	213	0.22	
Independent	Gul Sher Sario	197	0.21	
Independent	Makhdoom Fazal Hussain Qureshi	127	0.13	
PSP	Shamsuddin Memon	99	0.10	
SUP	Amir Abbas Laghari	58	0.06	
Independent	Muhammad Juman	57	0.06	
Majority		22,181	23.34	
Valid ballots		95,016		
Rejected ballots		2,531		
Turnout		97,547		
Registered electors		179,048		
hold				

== General elections 2013 ==
Contesting candidates	Party affiliation	Votes polled

== General elections 2008 ==
Contesting candidates	Party affiliation	Votes polled

== See also ==
- PS-55 Tharparkar-IV
- PS-57 Matiari-II
