= Shah Abdul Karim Bulri =

Sindhi poet

- شاه عبدالڪريم بلڙي
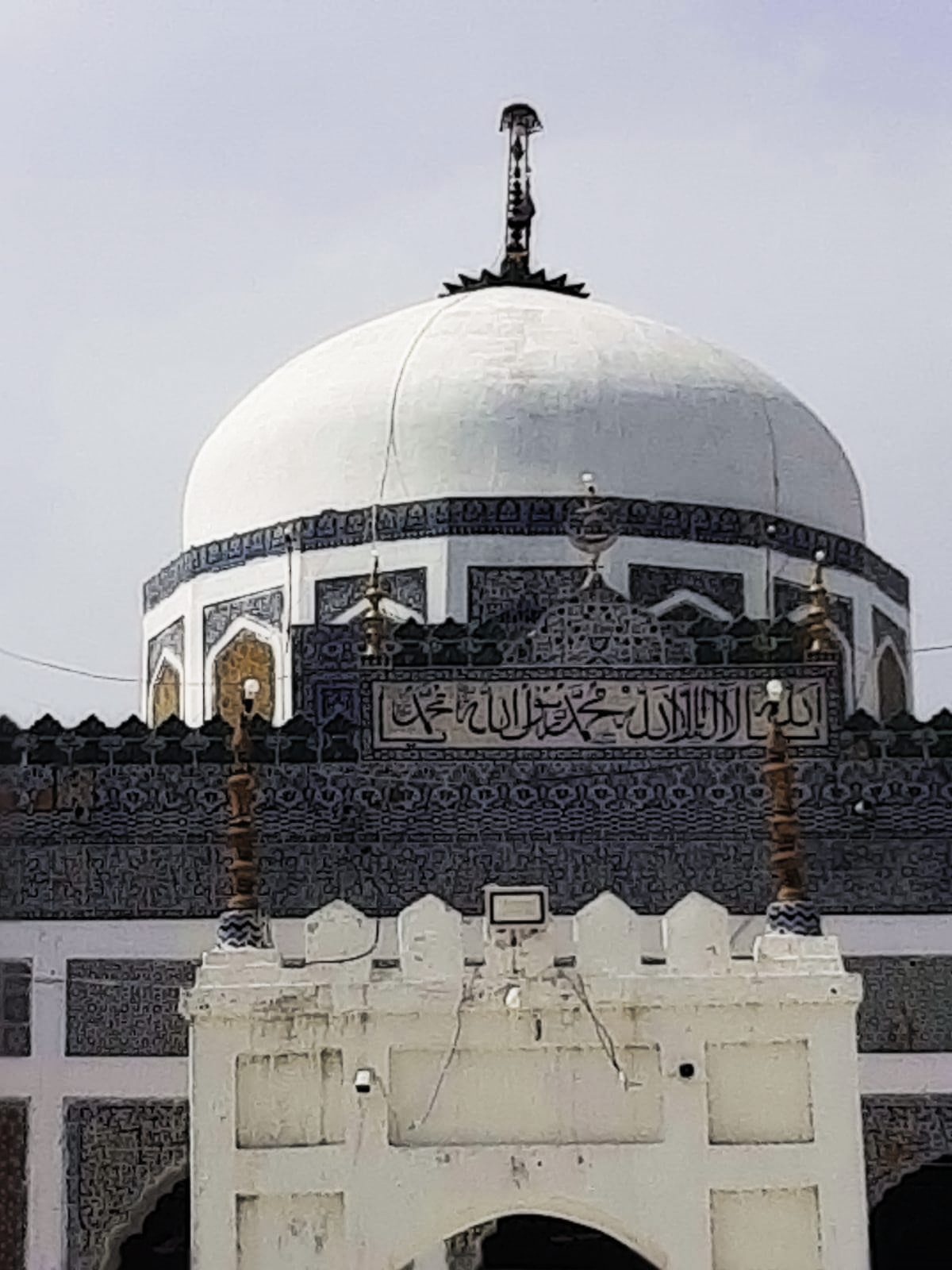
- Shrine of Shah Karim in Bulri, Sindh, Pakistan

Personal life
- Born: 1536 Mutalvi, Sindh, Pakistan
- Died: 1623 (aged 87) Bulri Shah Karim, Sindh, Pakistan
- Resting place: Shrine of Shah Abdul Karim Bulri, Bulri Shah Karim, Sindh, Pakistan
- Flourished: Mughal period
- Children: Syed Lal Muhammad Shah (died in childhood), Syed Abdul Rahim (died in lifetime), Syed Jalal Shah, Syed Burhan Shah, Syed Lal Muhammad Sani, Syed Din Muhammad, Syed Shah Hussain, Syed Abdul Quddus
- Parent: Syed Laal Muhammad Shah (father)
- Notable work: Bayan ul-Arifeen
- Education: Madrassa
- Known for: Being great-great-grandfather of Shah Abdul Latif Bhittai

Religious life
- Religion: Sunni Islam
- Order: Qadiriyyah and Suhrawardiyyah-Owaisiyyah
- Philosophy: Sufism
- Lineage: Sayyid through Musa al-Kazim
- Initiation: into Qadiri Tariqah and into Suhrawardi-Owaisi Tariqah by Syed Ibrahim Shah Bukhari (Qadiriyyah) and Makhdoom Nuh Halai (Suhrawardi-Owaisi)

Senior posting
- Teacher: Syed Ibrahim Shah Bukhari (Qadiriyyah), and Makhdoom Nuh Halai (Suhrawardi-Owaisi)
- Successor: Syed Jalal Shah
- Influenced by: Syed Ibrahim Shah Bukhari, Jalal ad-Din Muhammad Rumi, Makhdoom Nuh Halai, Makhdoom Adam Samejo, Miran Syed Muhammad Yusuf Shah Rizvi
- Influenced: Shah Abdul Latif Bhittai, Elsa Kazi, Allama I. I. Kazi, Umar Bin Muhammad Daudpota

Shah Abdul Karim of Bulri (1536–1623) (Sindhi: شاه عبدالڪريم بلڙي), famously known as "Shah Karim", was an early Sindhi Sufi poet from Sindh, Pakistan. Shah Abdul Karim Bulri was the great-great-grandfather of the famous poet Shah Abdul Latif Bhittai.

== Early life ==
He was born into a Syed family in Matiari, presently in eastern Sindh. Since he spent most of his life in Bulri, a village in Tando Muhammad Khan, the suffix Bulri is often appended to his name. His father died when he was young, and he was brought up by his mother and elder brother Syed Jalal. From childhood, he took a keen interest in matters related to God and spirituality and often did not pay attention to the lessons taught at school and instead spent his time immersed in thoughts of God. He frequently went to mystical gatherings where sermons accompanied by rural music were sung. This affected him so much that he gradually started to compose his own poetry.

When he was of age, Shah Abdul Karim married as per the wish of his elder brother Syed Jalal Shah. He met a very devout individual in his local mosque named Sultan Ibrahim and, impressed by him, became his disciple. After the death of his elder brother, to take care of his family, he became a laborer as per the advice of Sultan Ibrahim. Shah Abdul Karim imposed a very stringent discipline on himself which few people around him knew of. He used to work in the day with interludes for prayer. In the night, he used to walk around the locality filling any earthen pots he found empty. As he grew older he wrote many spiritual poems in Sindhi and used them as a device to express his love for the Divine. During his old age, he was highly respected by the people and had a number of disciples.

His poetry and malfuzat appeared for the first time in Bayan al-Arifin wa Tanbih al-Ghafilin, a Persian work, written by a disciple he had later in his life named Mir Daryai Tharawi, in 1630, seven years after his death. One of the major poets of Sindhi, Shah Karim Bulri has been called the Chaucer of Sindhi Literature.

== See also ==
- Jalal al-Din Rumi
- Shah Abdul Latif Bhittai
- Sachal Sarmast
