= Hussain Bakhsh Khadim =

Sindhi Language poet

- حسين بخش خادم
- Born: 15 January 1930; Village Arazi, District Jamshoro, Sindh, Pakistan
- Died: 12 March 1992 (aged 62); Village Sulaiman Khan Khatian, Taluka and District Matiari, Sindh, Pakistan.
- Resting place: Village Arazi, District Jamshoro
- Occupations: Poet and singer
- Writing career
- Pen name: Khadim
- Language: Sindhi
- Period: 1950–1992
- Genres: Ghazal, Kafi, Nazm, Hamd, Naʽat, Dhamal
- Subjects: Love, Patriotism, Brotherhood

Hussain Bakhsh Khadim (15 January 1930 – 12 March 1992), also spelled as Hussain Bux Khadim, was a Sindhi language folk singer and poet.

== Biography ==
Hussain Bakhsh was born on 15 January 1930 at Arazi, district Jamshoro, Sindh, Pakistan. His father's name was Pir Bakhsh Bhanger. He only completed four classes in the primary school of his village. However, his childhood was spent in the company of esteemed elders, literary figures, and scholars from his village, which fostered his lifelong inclination towards music and poetry. From a young age, he began singing at social gatherings, marriage ceremonies, shrines, and local festivals. He had deep devotion for the renowned poet and spiritual leader, Makhdoom Muhammad Zaman Talibul Maula. It was in Makhdoom's company that Hussain Bakhsh's passion for poetry thrived. Initially, he would sing the poetry of Makhdoom, but eventually, he began composing his own verses. Talibul Maula, who suggested "Khadim" (meaning "servant") as his penname, was his teacher, mentor and spiritual leader who used to improve his poetry.

Hussain Bakhsh Khadim embarked on his singing journey at Radio Pakistan Karachi in 1955. Coincidentally, that same year witnessed the establishment of Radio Pakistan Hyderabad, prompting him to make the move. It was through his songs recorded on this radio station that he gained immense fame and recognition. He performed in many countries, including Germany, Italy, the Netherlands, France, and the US. He also served as playback singer in Sindhi film Tuhinjoon Galihyoon Sajjan (Sindhi: تنھنجون ڳالھيون سڄڻ).

== Death ==
Hussain Bakhsh Khadim died on 12 March 1992 at the Shrine of Muhammad Faquir Khatian in the village of Sulaiman Khatian. He was laid to rest in his ancestral village, Arazi.
