= NA-216 Matiari =

Constituency of the National Assembly of Pakistan

- Constituency for the National Assembly of Pakistan
- Region: Matiari District
- Electorate: 417,629

Current constituency
- Party: Pakistan People's Party
- Member(s): Makhdoom Jamiluzaman
- Created from: NA-218 Hyderabad-I

NA-216 Matiari (این اے-216، مٹیاری) is a constituency for the National Assembly of Pakistan.

== Assembly Segments ==
| Constituency number | Constituency | District | Current MPA | Party |
|---|---|---|---|---|
| 56 | PS-56 Matiari-I | Matiari District | Makhdoom Mehboob Zaman | PPP |
| 57 | PS-57 Matiari-II | Matiari District | Makhdoom Fakhar Zaman | PPP |

== Members of Parliament ==
=== 2018–2023: NA-223 Matiari ===
| Election | Member | Party |
|---|---|---|
| 2018 | Makhdoom Jamiluzaman | PPPP |

=== 2024–present: NA-216 Matiari ===
| Election | Member | Party |
|---|---|---|
| 2024 | Makhdoom Jamiluzaman | PPPP |

== Election 2002 ==
General elections were held on 10 October 2002. Makhdoom Amin Fahim of PPP won by 102,059 votes.

General election 2002: NA-218 Hyderabad-I
| Party | Candidate | Votes | % | ±% |
|---|---|---|---|---|
| PPP | Makhdoom Muhammad Amin Faheem | 102,059 | 91.03 | |
| MQM | Rasool Bux Memon | 3,615 | 3.22 | |
| PML(Q) | Shahabuddin Shah | 3,277 | 2.92 | |
| PPP(SB) | Peeral Majeedano | 3,168 | 2.83 | |
| Turnout | | 113,224 | 40.95 | |
| Total valid votes | | 112,119 | 99.02 | |
| Rejected ballots | | 1,105 | 0.98 | |
| Majority | | 98,444 | 97.81 | |
| Registered electors | | 276,462 | | |

== Election 2008 ==
General elections were held on 18 February 2008. Makhdoom Amin Fahim of PPP won by 97,717 votes.

General election 2008: NA-218 Hyderabad-I
| Party | Candidate | Votes | % | ±% |
|---|---|---|---|---|
| PPP | Makhdoom Muhammad Amin Faheem | 97,717 | 76.91 | |
| PML(N) | Makhdoom Shah Nawaz Qureshi | 26,510 | 20.87 | |
| Others | Others (nine candidates) | 2,822 | 2.22 | |
| Turnout | | 130,463 | 49.35 | |
| Total valid votes | | 127,049 | 97.38 | |
| Rejected ballots | | 3,414 | 2.62 | |
| Majority | | 71,207 | 56.04 | |
| Registered electors | | 264,342 | | |
| PPP hold | | | | |

== Election 2013 ==
General elections were held on 11 May 2013. Makhdoom Amin Fahim of PPP won by 95,724 votes and became the member of National Assembly.

General election 2013: NA-218 Hyderabad-I
| Party | Candidate | Votes | % | ±% |
|---|---|---|---|---|
| PPP | Makhdoom Muhammad Amin Faheem | 95,724 | 54.29 | |
| PML(F) | Abdul Razzaque | 72,423 | 41.08 | |
| Others | Others (ten candidates) | 8,165 | 4.63 | |
| Turnout | | 181,636 | 62.93 | |
| Total valid votes | | 176,312 | 97.07 | |
| Rejected ballots | | 5,324 | 2.93 | |
| Majority | | 23,301 | 13.21 | |
| Registered electors | | 288,653 | | |
| PPP hold | | | | |

== By-Election 2016 ==
By-Election 2016: NA-218 Hyderabad-I
| Party | Candidate | Votes | % | ±% |
|---|---|---|---|---|
| PPP | Makhdoom Saeed-uz-Zaman | 95,049 | 80.82 | |
| MWM | Syed Farman Ali Shah | 17,064 | 14.51 | |
| Independent | Saeed Ahmed | 2,586 | 2.20 | |
| Others | Others (four candidates) | 2,912 | 2.47 | |
| Turnout | | 120,062 | 38.93 | |
| Total valid votes | | 117,611 | 97.96 | |
| Rejected ballots | | 2,451 | 2.04 | |
| Majority | | 77,985 | 66.31 | |
| Registered electors | | 308,398 | | |
| PPP hold | | | | |

== Election 2018 ==
General elections were held on 25 July 2018.

General election 2018: NA-223 Matiari
| Party | Candidate | Votes | % | ±% |
|---|---|---|---|---|
| PPP | Makhdoom Jamiluzaman | 109,960 | 61.25 | |
| GDA | Makhdoom Fazal Hussain Qureshi | 50,366 | 28.06 | |
| Others | Others (twelve candidates) | 19,192 | 10.69 | |
| Turnout | | 185,379 | 54.06 | |
| Total valid votes | | 179,518 | 96.84 | |
| Rejected ballots | | 5,861 | 3.16 | |
| Majority | | 59,594 | 33.19 | |
| Registered electors | | 342,906 | | |
| PPP hold | | Swing | N/A | |

== Election 2024 ==
Elections were held on 8 February 2024. Makhdoom Jamiluzaman won the election with 124,536 votes.

General election 2024: NA-216 Matiari
| Party | Candidate | Votes | % | ±% |
|---|---|---|---|---|
| PPP | Makhdoom Jamiluzaman | 124,536 | 57.57 | ▼3.68 |
| PML(N) | Bashir Ahmed | 80,439 | 37.19 | ▲36.82 |
| Others | Others (ten candidates) | 11,339 | 5.24 | |
| Turnout | | 224,811 | 53.83 | ▼0.23 |
| Total valid votes | | 216,314 | 96.22 | |
| Rejected ballots | | 8,497 | 3.78 | |
| Majority | | 44,097 | 20.39 | ▼12.80 |
| Registered electors | | 417,629 | | |
| PPP hold | | | | |

== See also ==
- NA-215 Tharparkar-II
- NA-217 Tando Allahyar
