= Matiari tehsil =

Coordinates: 25.598°N 68.446°E

Matiari Tehsil
- Tehsil
- Interactive map of Matiari Tehsil
- Country: Pakistan
- Province: Sindh
- District: Matiari District
- Time zone: UTC+5 (PST)

Matiari Tehsil is an administrative subdivision, (Tehsil), of Matiari District in the Sindh province of Pakistan. As of the 2017 census, Matiari Taluka has a population of 340,677, including 297,553 rural and 43,124 urban residents. The total area of this Taluka is 706 km^{2}.

Matiari City is the headquarter of this Tehsil. Other notable towns and villages include Allah Dino Sand, Palijani Station, Tajpur, Sekhat, Shahpur Darpur, Udero Lal Village and Udero Lal Station.

== Brief history ==
Sindh is known as the valley of saints, which in ancient times reached as far as Multan (now in Punjab Province). Islam first spread through the preachers (sahabas and saints) who educated the people of this valley through their teachings. For the last several hundred years the region of Sindh from Nawabshah to Thatta has been known as the area of Sahteya (literature and education) with Matiari at its centre.
