= Mulla Makhan railway station =

Railway station in Pakistan

Coordinates: 25.793988°N 68.579528°E

Mulla Makhan railway station مُلان مکڻ ريلوي اسٽيشن

General information
- Owner: Ministry of Railways

Other information
- Station code: MLMN

History
- Former names: Great Indian Peninsula Railway
Location

Mulla Makhan railway station (Urdu: ملا مکھن ریلوے اسٹیشن, Sindh: مُلان مکڻ ريلوي اسٽيشن) is located in Taluka Hala, District Matiari, Sindh, Pakistan.

== See also ==
- List of railway stations in Pakistan
- Pakistan Railways
