= Allahdino Sand railway station =

Railway station in Pakistan

Allahdino Sand Station الله دینو ساند ریلوے اسٹیشن الهڏنو ساند ريلوي اسٽيشن

General information
- Coordinates: 25.5035°N 68.5223°E
- Owner: Ministry of Railways
- Line: Karachi–Peshawar Railway Line

Other information
- Station code: ADS

History
- Opened: 1896

Services
Preceding station	Pakistan Railways	Following station
Khatian Road towards Kiamari	Karachi–Peshawar Line	Palijani towards Peshawar Cantonment
Location

Allahdino Sand Railway Station (Urdu: الله دینو ساند ریلوے اسٹیشن, Sindhi: الھڏنو ساند ريلوي اسٽيشن) is located in Allahdino Sand village, Matyari district, Sindh province, Pakistan.

== See also ==
- List of railway stations in Pakistan
- Pakistan Railways
- Allah Dino Sand
