= Hala (Pakistan) railway station =

Railway station in Pakistan

Hala railway station هالا ريلوي اسٽيشن

General information
- Owner: Ministry of Railways

Other information
- Station code: HLA

History
- Former names: Great Indian Peninsula Railway
Location

Hala railway station (Urdu: ہالہ ریلوے اسٹیشن, Sindhi: هالا ريلوي اسٽيشن) is located in Hala City, District Matiari, Sindh, Pakistan.

== See also ==
- List of railway stations in Pakistan
- Pakistan Railways
- Hala City
- Taluka Hala
