= Muhammad Faquir Khatian =

Sufi poet of Sindh

Muhammad Faquir Khatian محمد فقير کٽياڻ
- Born: 1878; Village Sulaiman Khatian, Matiari District, Sindh, British India
- Died: 4 February 1941; Village Sulaiman Khatian, Matiari District, Sindh, British India
- Feast: 07th Safar – of the Hijri calendar 08th Safar – of the Hijri calendar 09th Safar – of the Hijri calendar
- Major works: Mantooq-e-Muhammadi

Philosophical work
- Era: English Period
- Region: Islam
- School: Sufism
- Language: Sindhi
- Main interests: Folk Music, Sindhi and Seraiki poetry, Sufi Kalam

Muhammad Faquir Khatian (1878 - 4 February 1941) was a classical Sufi poet of Sindh, Pakistan. He was one the best Sindhi and Seraiki Sufi poets of Sindh during the British Raj in India (Now Pakistan).

== Biography ==
Muhammad Faquir Khatian was born in 1878 in the house of Rais Hyder Khan Khatian in the village of Sulaiman Khatian, located in the Matiari district of Sindh, Pakistan. The village of Sulaiman Khatian is situated approximately 7 kilometers northeast of Tando Jam. In accordance with the customs of that era, Muhammad Faquir Khatian pursued his studies in Arabic, Persian, and Quranic studies in his home village. Unfortunately, after the demise of his father, he was compelled to halt his formal education. Nonetheless, whenever he found the opportunity, he would acquire knowledge of Persian from Abdul Rehman Samoo, a resident of Karnani Samoo village. For a brief period, he served as a manager for Rais Ghulam Muhammad Khan Bhurgri in the village of Dengan Bhurgri, located in Taluka Kot Ghulam Muhammad. However, he eventually decided to leave that position and returned to his own village.

He was a devoted follower of Pir Pagara, the spiritual leader of the Hur Jammait in Sindh. He joined the Hur force led by Pir Pagara in 1915-16 and remained a part of this force for several years.

He had a deep fondness for spiritual music, poetry, and the Sufic way of life since childhood. The Sufi poetry of Nawab Wali Muhammad Leghari, a legendary poet and Sufi master from Sindh, profoundly inspired him. Under the guidance and companionship of Nawab Wali Muhammad Leghari, Muhammad Faquir himself emerged as a remarkable Sufi poet. His poetry reached its pinnacle under the spiritual patronage of Makhdoom Ghulam Hyder, the successor of Sufi saint Makhdoom Nooh of Hala. While singing his own poetry with his faquirs (companions), he would often use the Yaktaro (a single-stringed instrument) and Chaparyoon (a pair of wooden instruments). This style of singing Sufi kalam (poetry) continues to be popular in rural Sindh.

His Sindhi and Seraiki poetry collection titled Mantooq-e-Muhammadi (Sindhi: منطوق محمدي) was compiled and published by Makhdoom Muhammad Zaman Talibul Maula in 1950. The second and third editions of the same collection were published by Rais Ahmad Khan Khatian in 2002 and 2008 respectively.

A dictionary of poetry of Muhammad Faqir and Mahmood Faqir Khatian titled Akhar Akhar men Israr (Sindhi: اکر اکر ۾ اسرار) was compiled by Inayat Unar and published by Sindhi Language Authority in 2014.

== Death ==
Muhammad Faquir Khatian died on 4 February 1941 and was laid to rest in his native village of Sulaiman Khan Khatian.
