= Bhanoth =

Town in Sindh, Pakistan

Bhanoth (Sindhi :ڀاڻوٺ) is a town and union council of Hala Taluka, Matiari District of Sindh, Pakistan. The education for boys and girls is available till Higher Secondary School/College level in the town.

Bhanoth was a vibrant river port town in times of Shah Latif and earlier and is mentioned in historical records

Bhanoth has been primarily developed by the Influential Shah Family, they’ve brought road network, govt schools, govt hospital, water supply, drainage, electricity and all other facilities and provided land free of cost for those facilities to be built in the town. Notable people who have contributed to the development of Bhanoth are; Syed Shah Muhammad Shah (ex advisor to CM) Syed Rasool Buksh Shah (twice chairman union council Bhanoth) Syed Mir Hassan Shah (Chairman Zakat and Ushr) Syed Shah Zaman Shah (Director in Board of Directors HESCO) Syed Sher Muhammad Shah (Philanthropist and agriculturalist)
