= Makhdoom Mehboob Zaman =

Pakistani politician

Provincial Minister of Sindh for Food Department
- Incumbent
- Assumed office 25 September 2025

Sindh Minister for Rehabilitation
- In office 17 April 2024 – 25 September 2025

Provincial Minister of Sindh for Revenue and Relief
- In office 19 August 2018 – 11 August 2023

Member of the Provincial Assembly of Sindh
- In office 24 February 2024 – Incumbent
- Constituency: PS-56 Matiari-I

Member of the Provincial Assembly of Sindh
- In office 13 August 2018 – 11 August 2023
- Constituency: PS-58 Matiari-I

Personal details
- Born: 25 May 1991 (age 34) Karachi, Sindh, Pakistan
- Party: PPP (2018-present)
- Parent: Makhdoom Jameeluz Zaman (father)
- Relatives: Ameen Faheem (grandfather); Makhdoom Muhammad Zaman Talibul Moula (great-grandfather)

Makhdoom Mehboob Zaman (Sindhi: مخدوم محبوب الزمان; Urdu: مخدوم محبوب الزمان) is a Pakistani politician serving as the Provincial Minister of Sindh for Food Department. He previously served as the Sindh Minister for Rehabilitation from 17 April 2024 to 25 September 2025, and as the Provincial Minister of Sindh for Revenue and Relief from 19 August 2018 to 11 August 2023. He is a member of the Provincial Assembly of Sindh.

== Early life and education ==
He was born on 25 May 1991 in Karachi, Pakistan.

He received a degree of Master of Arts in Political Science from the University of Sindh.

== Political career ==
He was elected to the Provincial Assembly of Sindh as a candidate of Pakistan Peoples Party from Constituency PS-58 (Matiari-I) in the 2018 Pakistani general election.

On 19 August, he was inducted into the provincial Sindh cabinet of Chief Minister Syed Murad Ali Shah and was made Provincial Minister of Sindh for Revenue and Relief.
