= Purana Hala =

Ancient town in Pakistan

Coordinates: 25°48′N 68°23′E

Purana Hala is a small ancient town situated in Hala subdivision of Matiari district in Sindh, Pakistan. Its original name was Murtazabad. Due to inundation from the Indus River, a new town with the same name was founded 2 miles (3.2 km) called Hala new and the existing town became known as Hala Purano.
