= Halas =

Halas may refer to:

- Halas (surname)
- Halas (food)
- Halas lace
- Halas and Batchelor, an animation company
- Kiskunhalas, a town in Hungary, colloquially known as "Halas"

== See also ==
- Hala (disambiguation)
