= Halla =

Halla may refer to:

== Places ==
- Halla, Punjab, a town in the Punjab province of Pakistan
- Halla, Estonia, a village in Vastseliina Parish, Võru County, Estonia
- Hallasan (Mount Halla), a mountain in South Korea
- Halla University, a Korean University
- Halla, an exoplanet orbiting 8 Ursae Minoris

== Fictional places ==
- Halla (fictional kingdom), a fictional kingdom depicted in Goopy Gyne Bagha Byne
- Halla, a name given to the multiverse featured in The Pendragon Adventure by DJ MacHale
- Halla (Stargate), a planet in the fictional universe of Stargate SG-1
- Halla (Dragon Age), a white deer like creature sacred to the video games' "dalish" wood elves.

== Other uses ==
- Halla (horse), a show jumping horse that won a record three Olympic gold medals
- HL Group, formerly Halla Group, a South Korean chaebol
- Anyang Halla, a professional hockey team in Asia League Ice Hockey
- MS Halla, a ro-ro ferry in service with Seaboard during 1987
- Challah, a type of bread

== See also ==
- Hala (disambiguation)
- Hallas, a surname
- Halle (disambiguation)
