= Bhit Shah railway station =

Railway station in Pakistan

Coordinates: 25.807084°N 68.50199°E

Bhitshah railway station ڀٽ شاھ ريلوي اسٽيشن

General information
- Owner: Ministry of Railways

Other information
- Station code: BTSH

History
- Former names: Great Indian Peninsula Railway
Location

Bhit Shah railway station (Urdu: بھٹ شاہ ریلوے اسٹیشن, Sindhi: ڀٽ شاھ ريلوي اسٽيشن) is a railway station located in the town of Bhit Shah, Sindh, Pakistan.

== See also ==
- List of railway stations in Pakistan
- Pakistan Railways
