= Bhit Shah Museum =

- بھٹ شاہ میوزیم
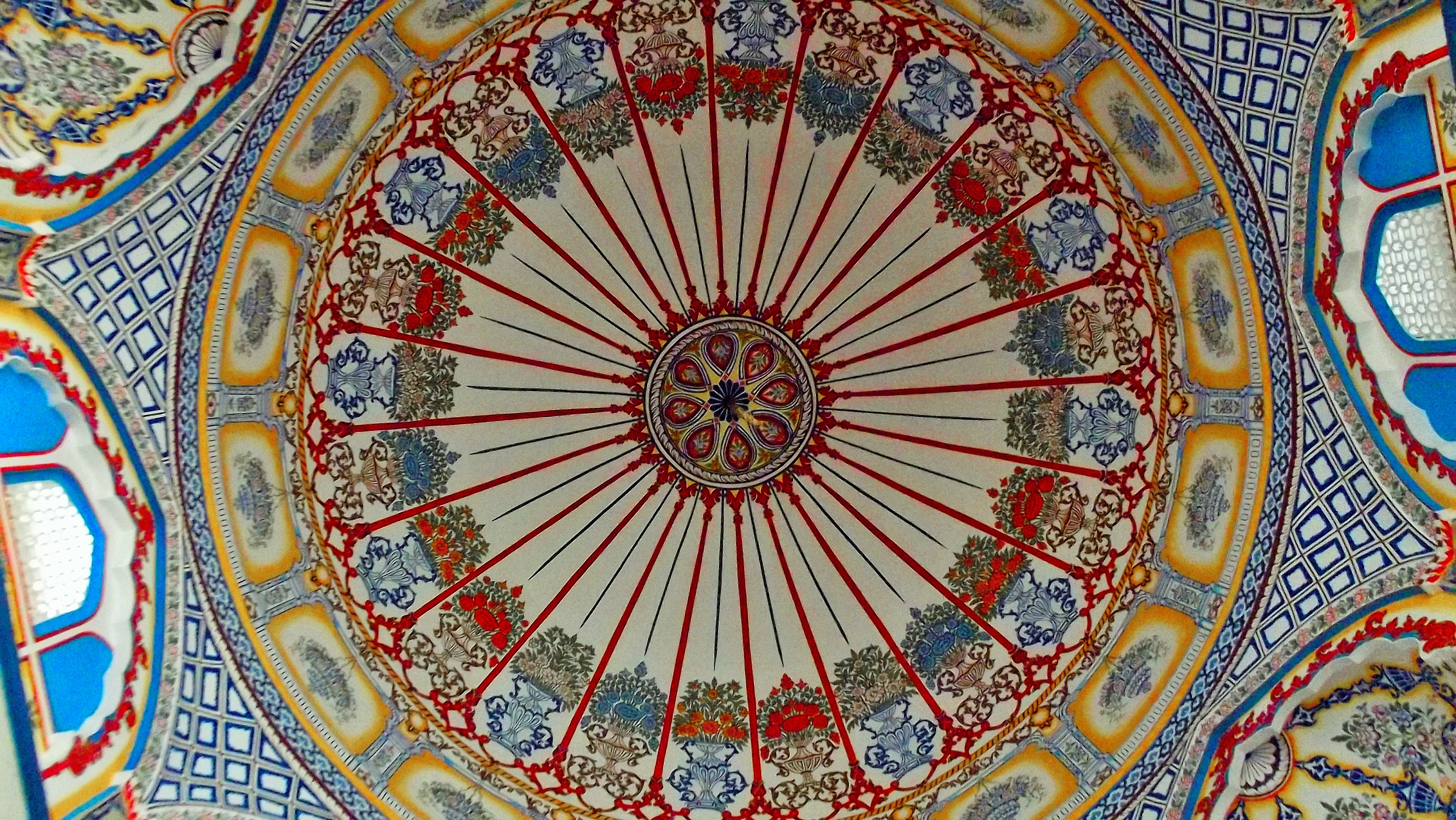
- Established: July 10, 1996; 30 years ago
- Location: Bhit Shah, Matiari District, Sindh, Pakistan
- Coordinates: 25°48′09″N 68°29′26″E
- Owner: Sindh Tourism Development Corporation

Bhit Shah Museum is located in Bhit Shah in Matiari District of Sindh in southeast Pakistan. The museum depicts various aspects of the poetry of Sindhi Sufi mystic Shah Abdul Latif Bhittai. It was established as a sister organization to the Bhit Shah Cultural Centre and is frequented by people visiting the nearby shrine of Bhittai.

It was inaugurated on 10 July 1996 by President Farooq Ahmed Leghari on the eve of the 252nd urs of the saint.
