= Makhdoom Saeeduz Zaman =

Pakistani politician

Member of the National Assembly of Pakistan
- In office 12 February 2016 – 31 May 2018
- Constituency: NA-218 (Matiari-cum-Hyderabad)

Personal details
- Party: Pakistan Peoples Party
- Children: Makhdoom Haseeb Zaman Makhdoom Ahmed Zaman
- Parent: Makhdoom Zaman Talib-ul-Mola (father)

Makhdoom Saeed-uz-Zaman (Sindhi: مخدوم سعيد الزمان; Urdu: مخدوم سعیدالزماں) is a Pakistani politician who had been a member of the National Assembly of Pakistan from February 2016 to May 2018.

== Political career ==
He was elected to the National Assembly of Pakistan as a candidate of Pakistan Peoples Party (PPP) from Constituency NA-218 (Matiari-cum-Hyderabad) in a by-election held in January 2016. He received 114,079 votes and defeated Farman Shah, a candidate of Majlis Wahdat-e-Muslimeen. The seat became vacant after Ameen Faheem who won it in the 2013 election, died.
