= Jhulelal =

Jhulelal may refer to:

- Jhulelal (Hinduism), the Hindu water deity
- Jhulelal (Sufism), a title of Lal Shahbaz Qalandar (1177–1275). Muslim mystic of the Suhrawardy Sufi order
