= Hallis =

Hallis is a surname. Notable people with the surname include:

- Adolph Hallis (1896–1987), South African pianist, composer, and teacher
- Howard Hallis (born 1971), American artist

== See also ==
- Halinen
- Hallas
- Hollis (name)
- Wallis (surname)
