= University of Sufism and Modern Sciences =

- Motto: EXCELLENCE, INTEGRATION, LEADERSHIP
- Type: Public
- Established: 2011
- Affiliations: Higher Education Commission of Pakistan
- Chancellor: Governor of Sindh
- Vice-Chancellor: Professor Dr. Arabella Bhutto
- Academic staff: 30
- Administrative staff: 25
- Students: 1500
- Undergraduates: 1500
- Location: Bhitshah, Sindh, Pakistan
- Colors: Blue
- Website: www.usms.edu.pk

University of Sufism and Modern Sciences is a public university funded by the Government of Sindh in Bhit Shah, Sindh, Pakistan. It was founded in 2011 to promote education and research in Sufism and build Sufi studies as an academic subject in Sindh and to connect traditional education of Sufism with modern sciences. The University of Sufism and Modern Sciences (USMS) is situated in Bhitshah Town, Matiari District, home to a Shrine of the Sufi Saint Hazrat Shah Abdul Latif Bhittai.

The Charter of the University of Sufism and Modern Sciences was approved on 21 November 2011 under letter No: PAS/Legis-B-21/2011 dated 21 November 2011 and was initially established as a campus of the University of Sindh, Jamshoro. The university later became an independent university and Parveen Munshi has been appointed as the first vice-chancellor of The University of Sufism and Modern Sciences, Bhitshah on 11 April 2016.

== Academic departments ==
- DEPARTMENT OF INFORMATION AND COMPUTING
- DEPARTMENT OF BUSINESS ADMINISTRATION
- DEPARTMENT OF MANAGEMENT AND COMMERCE
- DEPARTMENT OF ENGLISH(Linguistic and Literature)

== Bachelor Degrees ==
Department	Discipline	Degree Program		
Department	Discipline	Bridge program (2 years)	BS (4 years)	B.Ed (2.5/1.5 years)
Education	Bachelor of Education	✗	✓	✓
INFORMATION AND COMPUTING	Computer Science	✓	✓	✗
INFORMATION AND COMPUTING	Information Technology	✓	✓	✗
BUSINESS ADMINISTRATION	Business Administration	✓	✓	✗
English (Linguistic and Literature)	English Literature	✗	✓	✗
MANAGEMENT AND COMMERCE	Accounting and Finance	✗	✓	✗
MANAGEMENT AND COMMERCE	Commerce	✓	✓	✗

== Administration ==
- Vice-Chancellor Secretariat
- Registrar Office
- Controller of Examination
- Directorate of Finance
- Office of Research, Innovation, and Commercialization (ORIC)
- Quality Enhancement Cell (QEC)
- Directorate of IT Services]
- Students Financial Aid Office
- Directorate of Sports
- Central Library
- Center for Sufi Studies, Research, and Publications (CSSRP)

== Research work ==
- Dunyae Tassawuf (Urdu Research Journal)
- Sufiani Sugandh (Sindhi research Journal)
- Journal of Sufi Research and Practice
