= Allah Dino Sand =

Village in Sindh, Pakistan

Allah Dino Sand الهڏنو ساند
- Village
- Country: Pakistan
- Province: Sindh
- District: Matiari
- Taluka: Matiari
- Time zone: UTC+5 (PST)
- Postal code: 70091

Allah Dino Sand, also spelled as Allahdino Sand (Sindhi: الهڏنو ساند), is a village in the Taluka and District of Matiari, Sindh, Pakistan. It is situated along the Karachi-Peshawar Railway Line. Although the village has a railway station, currently no trains stop there. The village is connected to Matiari, Tando Jam, Naserpur Town, Shahpur Darpur, Masu Bhurgri, and Village Wahid Dino Unar (also known as Village Hakeem Pir Hajan Shah Rashidi) via Road. The road from this village to Matiari has been improved in 2017. The village is situated approximately 13 km southeast of Matiari and 11 km northwest of Tando Jam. Various facilities have been established in the village, including a primary school, a high school, medical dispensary, and post office. The village derives its name from a respected individual named Allah Dino Sand. "Sand" or "Saand" (Sindhi: ساند) is a surname associated with the Sindhi Muslim community.

This village is situated in a highly fertile area of Sindh, where cotton, wheat, bananas, and sugarcane are the primary crops grown.
