= Sekhat =

- Town
- Location within Sindh
- Coordinates: 25.39°N 68.30°E
- Country: Pakistan
- Province: Sindh
- District: Matiari
- Elevation: 14 m (46 ft)
- Time zone: UTC+5 (PST)
- Number of towns: 1

Sekhat is a town and union council in the Matiari District of Sindh province, Pakistan.
