= Khatian Road railway station =

Railway station in Sindh, Pakistan

Khatian Road Station کاڑیاں روڈ ریلوے اسٹیشن کٽياڻ روڊ ريلوي اسٽيشن

General information
- Coordinates: 25.4465°N 68.4902°E
- Owner: Ministry of Railways
- Line: Karachi–Peshawar Railway Line

Other information
- Station code: KNX

Services
Preceding station	Pakistan Railways	Following station
Detha towards Kiamari	Karachi–Peshawar Line	Allahdino Sand towards Peshawar Cantonment
Location

Khatian Road Railway Station (Urdu: کاڑیاں روڈ ریلوے اسٹیشن, Sindhi: کٽياڻ روڊ ريلوي اسٽيشن) is located on Khatian Road Hyderabad district of Sindh province of the Pakistan.

== See also ==
- List of railway stations in Pakistan
- Pakistan Railways
