= Jhulelal (Hinduism) =

Incarnation of Varuna

Bhagwan Jhulelal
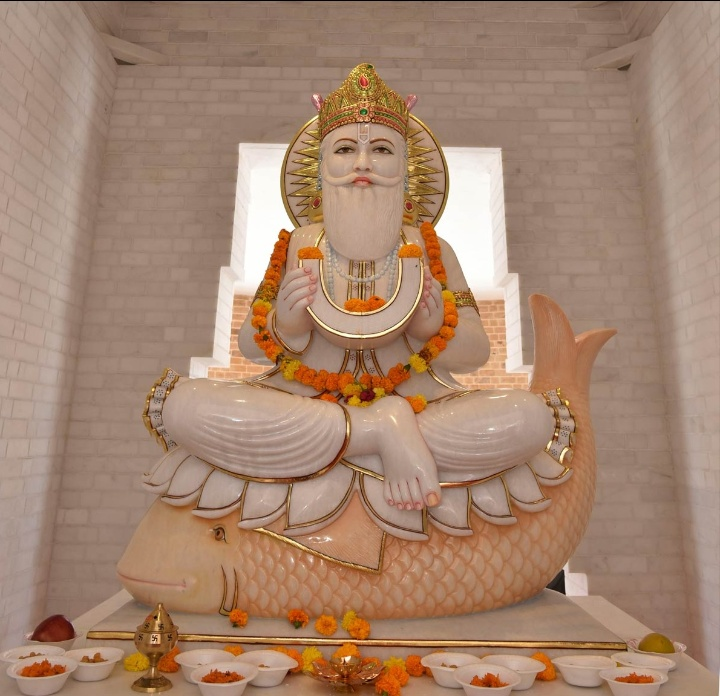
- Jhulelal, incarnation of Varuna, sitting on a lotus flower in the middle of a river and surrounded by a couple of silver fish (palla fish)
- Venerated in: Sindhi Hinduism
- Affiliation: Avatar of Varuna
- Abode: Sea & Indus River
- Mantra: Om Vam Varunaya Namah
- Weapon: Sword
- Mount: Hilsa Fish & Horse

Genealogy
- Siblings: Soma Rai & Bheda Rai

Jhulelal (Sindhi: جۡھولي لال ; Hindi: झूलेलाल) is a folkloric figure amongst the Sindhis and one of the most revered deities of Sindhi Hindus in the modern-day republics of Pakistan and India. He is considered to be an avatar of Hindu god Varuna. (Note: The chant Aayo Laal Sabhainjo Jhulelal is considered the "clarion call" of Sindhi)

Legends converge upon the fact that Jhulelal was born during the rule of one Islamic despot, "Mirkshah", who had issued an ultimatum to local Hindus to convert to Islam. The reincarnation of a Sindhi deity, Jhulelal exhibited supernatural powers since childhood; he preached about how the Muslims believed in the same God, and emphasized that the Quran forbade forced conversion. Ultimately, Jhulelal convinced the King to spare the Hindus and even gained devotees among the Muslims.

Devotion towards Jhulelal was very uniform in pre-partition Sindh, where he was a prominent figure within the Sindhi cultural pantheon. In 1950, Ram Panjwani in Bombay sought to transform Jhulelal into an icon of unity for the displaced Sindhi community. Through the widespread introduction of devotional songs, pamphlets, statues, festivals, and cultural events, Jhulelal successfully became established over the subsequent decades as the representative, unifying deity of the Sindhis.

Iconography of Jhulelal varies widely. Sindhi Hindus worship Jhulelal at the Shrine at Odero Lal in Pakistan's Sindh province, which is jointly used by Sindhi Hindus, and Sindhi Muslims who revere the shrine as the tomb of Sheikh Tahir. A second shrine named Jhulelal Tirthdham exists in India at Narayan Sarovar, Kutch, Gujarat.

== Folklore ==
=== Legendary account ===
After a long period of harmonious existence between the Hindus and Muslims, a new Amir, one Mirkshah of Thatta, ascended the throne. At the instigation of his advisors, he ordered that all local Hindus convert to Islam or be put to death. The Hindus prayed to Indus, who promised that Varuna would take the form of a child and avert the impending catastrophe.

In 1007 Vikram Samvat (950 CE), the day of Cheti Chand in Chaitra, Jhulelal was born to a local Hindu family of the Lohana caste. It was not long before Amir Mirkshah caught wind of rumors that the populace had begun to worship a local child as an incarnate deity; alarmed by this un-Islamic activity, the Amir sent his ministers to investigate. These latter returned with accounts of their witnessing strange events: the child in question transformed into a young warrior, then into an old man, before returning back to the form of a child; at other times, he rode up the river on the back of a fish; he acted and spoke like a sage, rather than a typical young boy; and performed various other feats before the disbelieving eyes of the advisors. (Note: Jhulelal is also believed by Sindhis to have performed other miracles, such as entering the Indus river at Nasirpur and coming up at Bukkur, at the northernmost extent of Sindh.) Mirkshah grew afraid, upon hearing of this, but his advisors, undaunted, convinced him to hold firm.

Soon, however, the Amir decided he must meet this prodigy for himself, and, upon their meeting, he found he was impressed by Jhulelal's understanding of Islam: Jhulelal preached that the Hindus and Muslims believed in the same God, and reminded Mirkshah that the Qur'an forbade compelled conversions. The latter's advisors—still determined to see their brutal forced-conversion scheme carried out—instead persuaded Mirkshah to disregard these teachings of Jhulelal's and order him imprisoned. However, when the guards arrived to attempt the arrest, an inferno and a flood together engulfed the Amir's palace. At this, Mirkshah relented, revoked his decree, and asked Jhulelal for forgiveness.

As the palace was saved and harmony restored, Jhulelal gained devotees even among the Muslims (including Mirkshah). Before taking his leave, Jhulelal advised the Amir that a flame be kept burning for eternity as a reminder of his omnipresence.

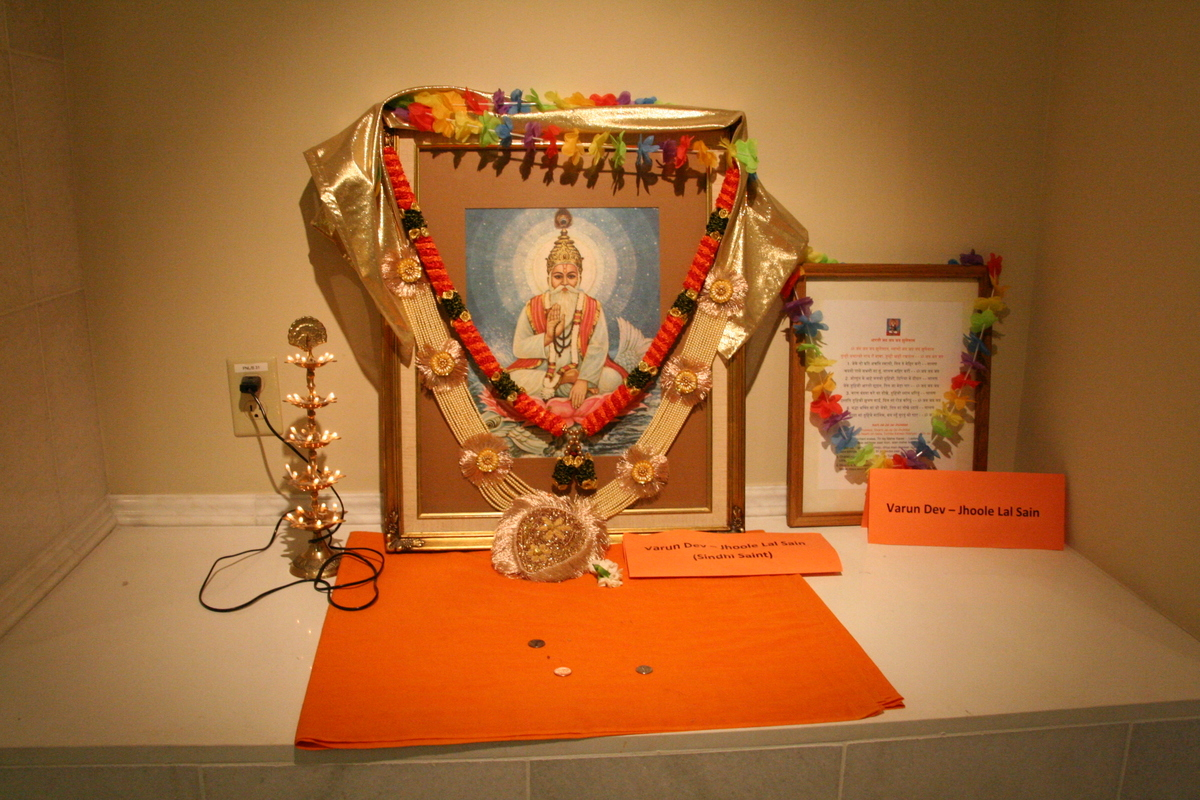
Picture of Jhule Lal in Hindu temple

=== Variant readings ===
The myth of Jhulelal is not seen in regional histories written before the 20th century. While nearly all Jhulelal legends revolve broadly around two main themes—the valorization of Sindhi communal harmony, and the intrinsic superiority of tolerant and devout Hindus over Muslims who are depicted as unable to interpret even their own religious texts—the specifics vary widely, and have occasionally been a cause of internal contestation even among Sindhi Hindus. At the same time, Sindhi Muslims have themselves forged their own legends concerning Jhulelal.

==== Hindus ====
The birth-name varies from Uderolal to Amarlal to Daryasahib; the event of his first appearance is either noted to be from a human birth or from the Indus, riding on a fish. He is variously noted as an avatara of Vishnu or a manifestation of Varuna—one account conflates the two and deems him to be the Varuna avatara of Vishnu—and how he came to be known as "Jhulelal" attracts entirely another set of fascinating claims. The result of his encounter with Mirkshah also varies: some claim that the Amir submitted instantly in the face of his supernatural powers, while others claim that Jhulelal was required to lead a secretly-gathered force to victory in a conventional war.

The presentation of the narrative also differs depending on the source. Many renderings choose to emphasize the cruelty of Muslim rulers against Brahmins (and, by extension, against all Hindus)—a column in Indian Express projects contemporary Hindu Nationalism onto the narrative, with Jhulelal "fill[ing] the shrinking Hindus with courage" and "put[ting] holy terror into the persecuting Muslims"—while some Sindhi accounts have transplanted Jhulelal into the reign of Aurangzeb, a ruler notorious in public memory for being the worst of all persecutors of Hindus. Still others choose to emphasize the Hinduness of Jhulelal by drawing tenuous connections with Vedic corpus.

== Festivals ==
=== Cheti Chand ===
The Cheti Chand festival in the month of Chaitra, marks the arrival of spring and harvest, as well as the incarnation day of Uderolal in the Vikram Samvat calendar year 1007. Uderolal morphed into a warrior and old man who preached and reprimanded Mirkhshah that Muslims and Hindus deserve the same religious freedoms. He, as Jhulelal, became the saviour of the Sindhi Hindus, who according to this legend, celebrate the new year as Uderolal's birthday.

=== Chaliya saheb ===
Chalio or Chaliho, also called Chaliho Sahib, is a forty-day-long festival celebrated by Sindhi Hindus to express their gratitude to Jhulelal for saving them from their impending conversion to Islam. The festival is observed every year in the months of July to August; dates vary according to the Hindu calendar. It is a thanksgiving celebration in honor of Varuna Deva for listening to their prayers.

== Shrines ==
=== Odero Lal Sai ===
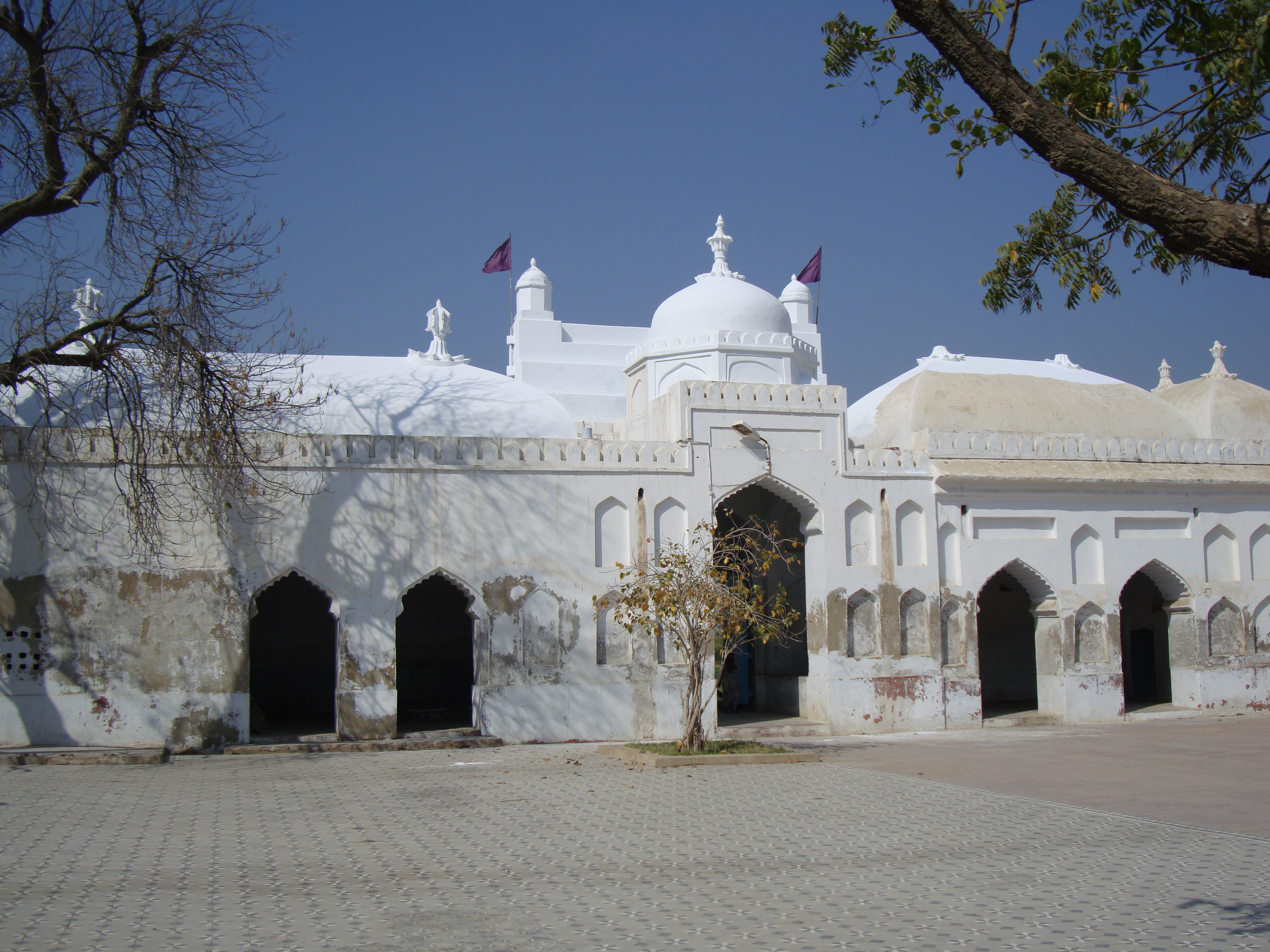
Odero Lal Shrine

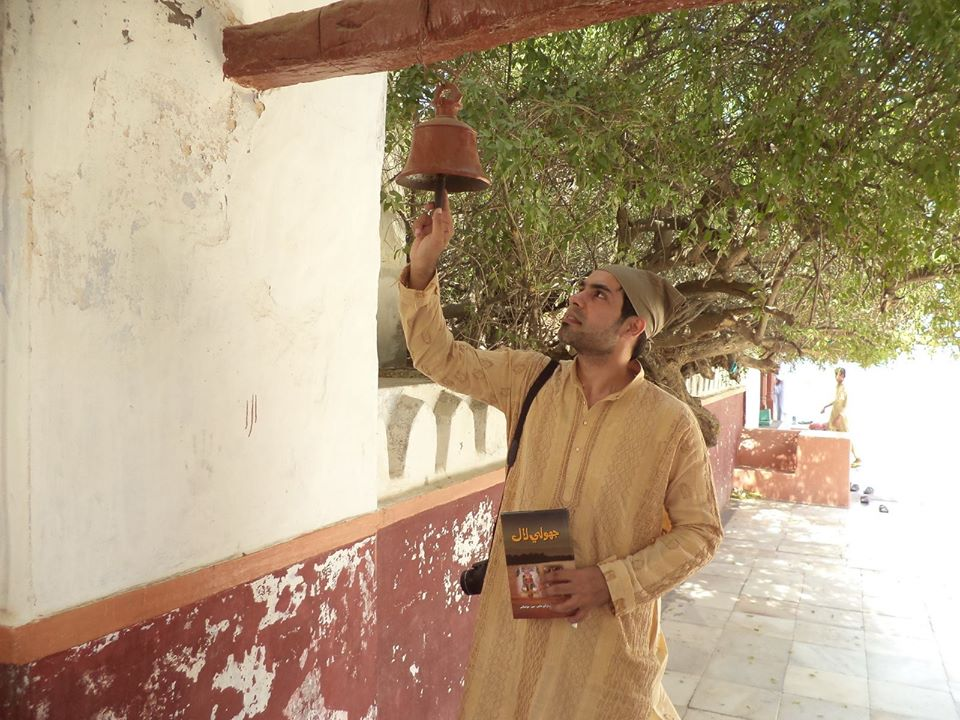
Visitors have to ring the bell before entering Jhulelal's shrine in order to mark their attendance

The Jhulelal Shrine at Odero Lal is situated in Matiari District, almost 40 kilometers away from the Sanghar District of Sindh; The Hindus and the Muslims can pray here at the same place simultaneously. Nawabshah, Hyderabad, Matiari, Sanghar and Mirpur Khas are the nearby major cities to reach at the Shrine near Tando Adam.

It forms the seat of the Daryapanthis, originally a subsect of the followers of Gorakhnath, who belong to the Nath tradition.

=== Jhulelal Tirthdham ===
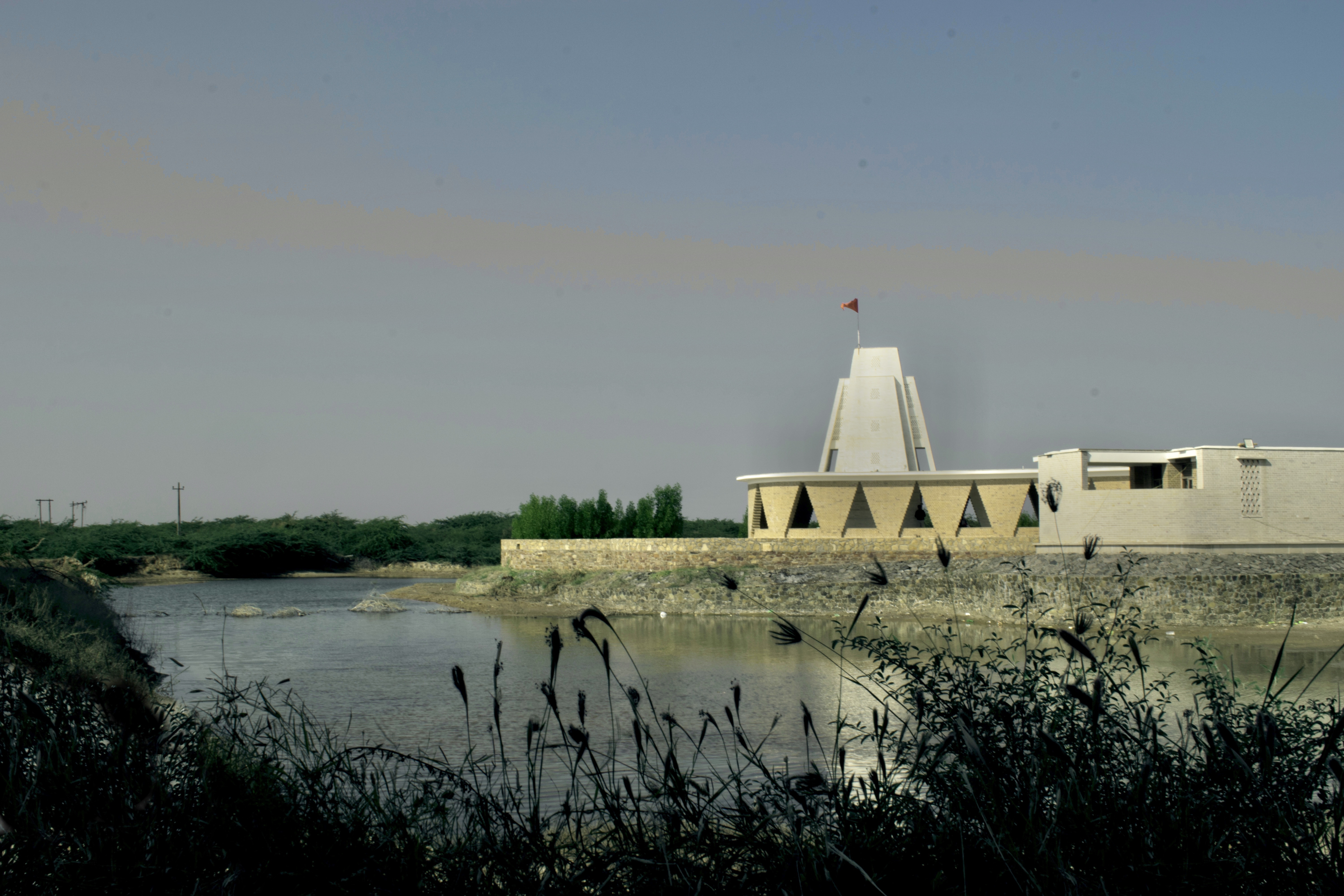
The view of Jhulelal Tirthdham

Sindhi Hindus in India built a religious shrine and cultural complex in Kutch in the Indian state of Gujarat, near the border of Sindh Province. The 100-acre complex includes a 100-foot statue of Lord Jhulelal, a museum, meditation centre, an auditorium, and a cultural and arts-and-crafts centre with 100 accommodations. Aiming to be the "a centre for global Sindhi identity", the project costs an estimated ₹100 crore and was built on the donations from wealthy Indian Sindhis. Harish Fabiani, one of the key promoters of the project, stated regarding the cultural complex, "The younger generation is aware they are Sindhis, but they do not know their language. We must learn our language and culture. We should have a place we can call our own."

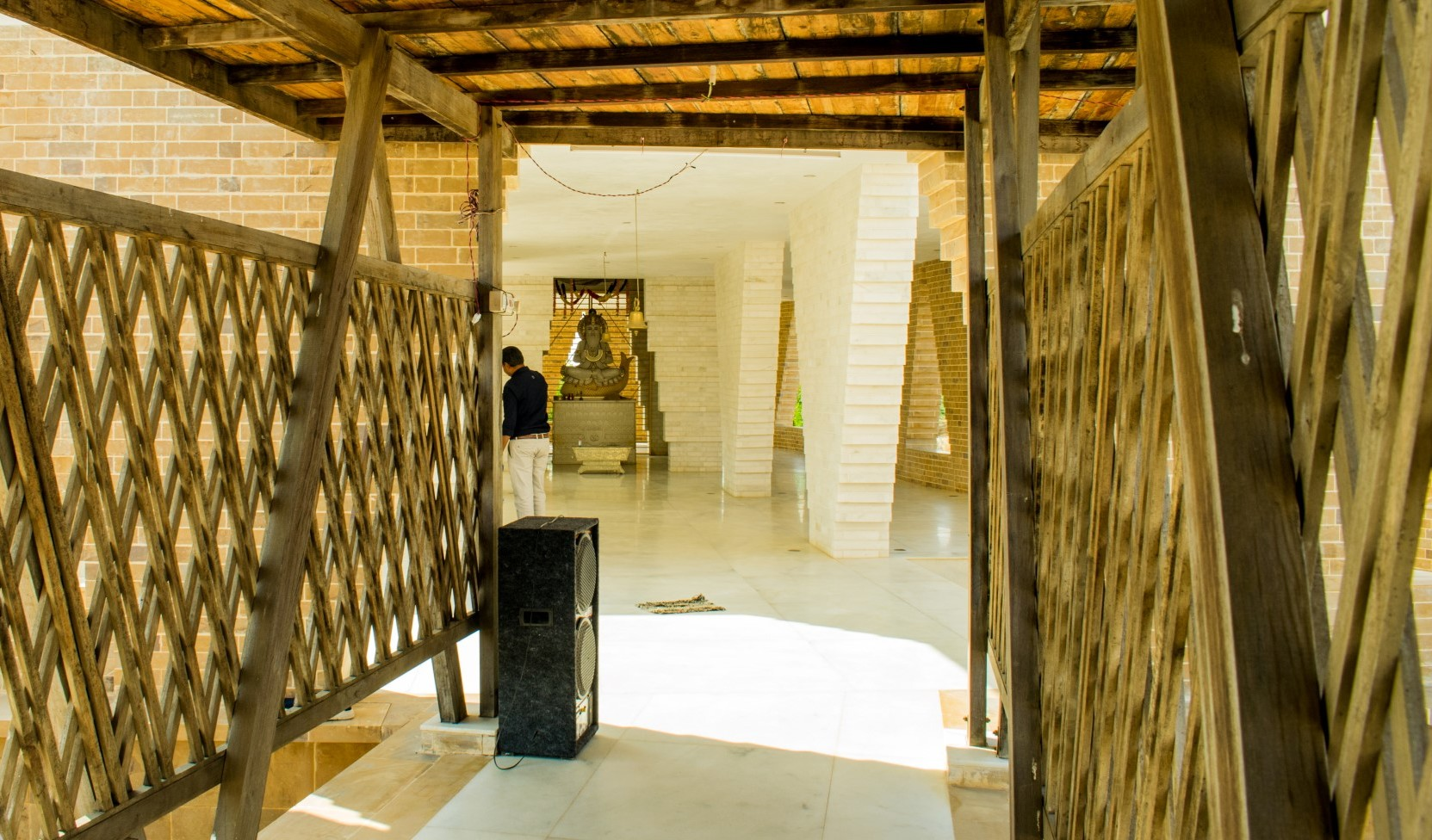

== Iconography ==
In the most common form, Jhulelal is represented as a fair-skinned, white-bearded man sitting cross-

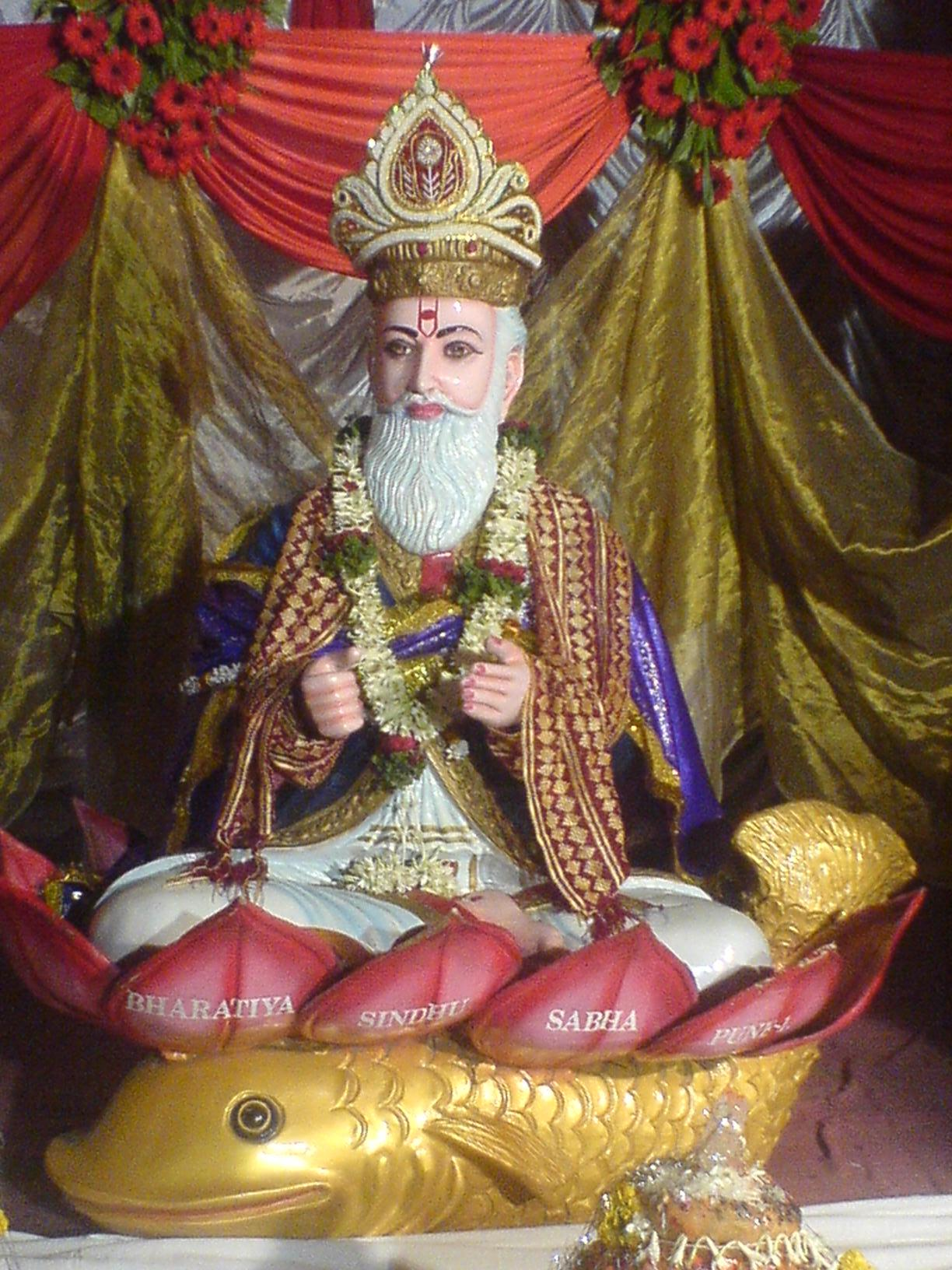

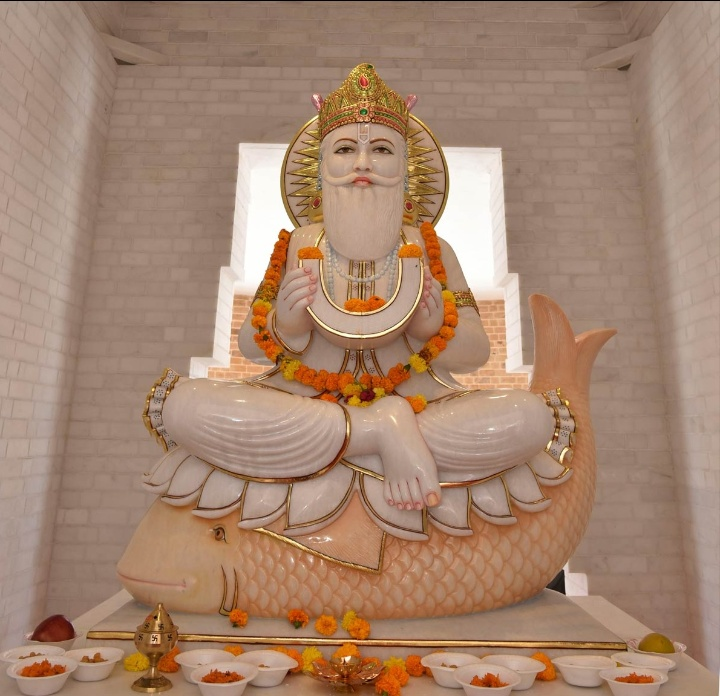

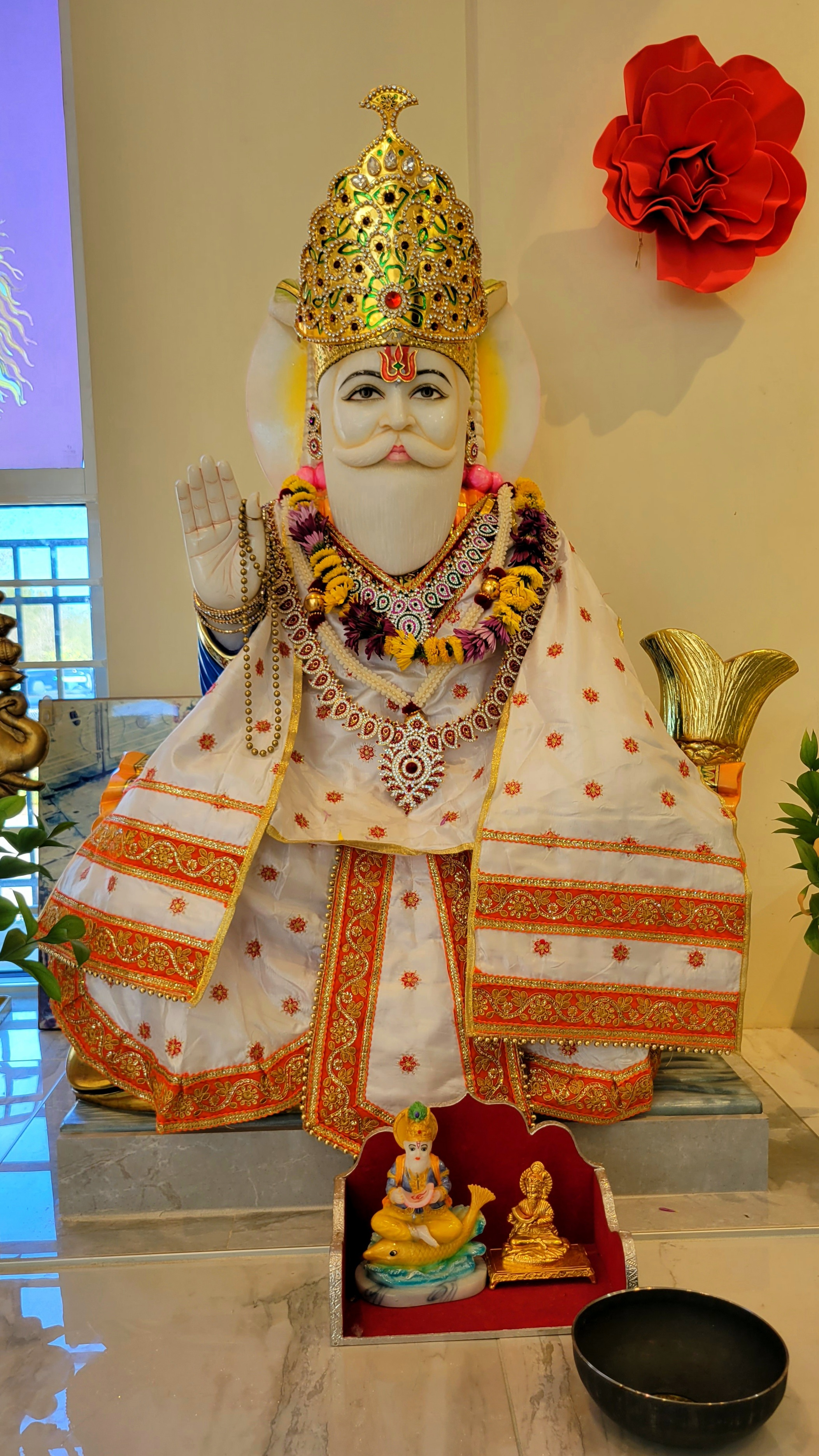

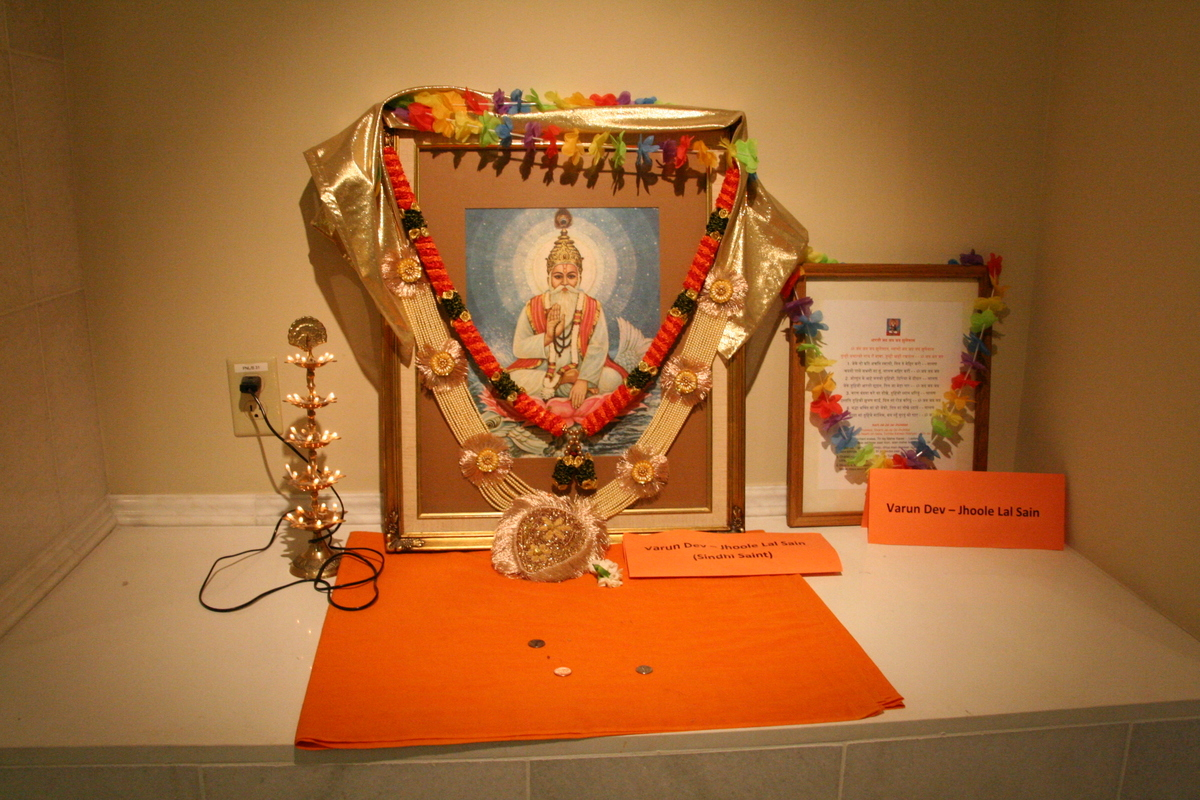

legged on a lotus flower that rests on a palla fish on the Sindhu River.

- He wears a royal attire with intricate golden patterns, a pink and gold shawl draped over his shoulders, and a white dhoti with red borders.
- A golden halo radiates behind his head, and he wears a golden crown adorned with jewels and a peacock feather.

In other forms, he is shown positioned directly on a palla fis holding a staff with both hands, symbolizing leadership.

He is also depicted in flowing saffron attire, symbolizing purity and devotion.

Typically, he is depcited with two arms holding a pothi, a sacred scripture called Amar Vani, symbolizing reflection, studies, and discourses to overcome ignorance.

== See also ==
- Cheti Chand
- Darya Lal Mandir
- Shri Varun Dev Mandir
