= Darya Lal Mandir =

Hindu temple in Pakistan

Darya Lal Sankat Mochan Mandir
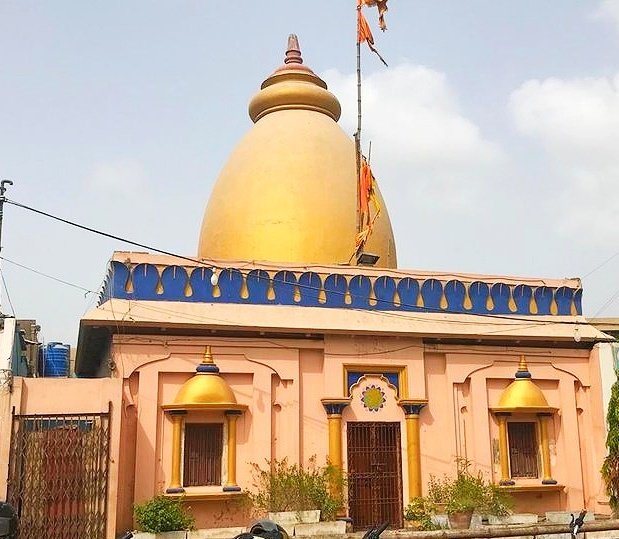

- Location within Sindh Location within Pakistan Location within Asia

Religion
- Affiliation: Hinduism
- District: Karachi South District
- Deity: Darya Lal (Jhulelal), incarnation of Varuna Deva
- Festival: Cheti Chand
- Governing body: Evacuee Trust Property Board

Location
- Location: Saddar Town
- State: Sindh
- Country: Pakistan
- Coordinates: 24°50′56″N 66°59′28″E

Architecture
- Type: Hindu Temple
- Established: 300 years old

Darya Lal Mandir (also known as Darya Lal Sankat Mochan Mandir) is a Hindu temple in Karachi, Pakistan. It is located near Custom House, Saddar Town in the Sindh Province of Pakistan. It is 300 years old. The temple is dedicated to Darya Lal (Jhulelal), who is considered as incarnation of Varuna Deva.

== History ==
The temple was constructed 300 years ago. The temple has a square shaped prayer area (12.1 metres by 12.1 metres). The temple was attacked in 1965 and in 1992 in retaliation of the Babri Masjid Incident. The temple became office of the transporting company. The temple was in a dilapidated condition and regular worshippers stopped coming.

== Architecture ==
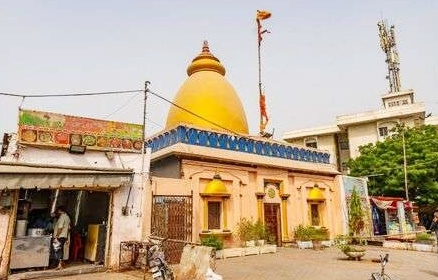
Darya Lal Mandir

It was built using limestone and the Jung Shahi stone. The temple is 12.1 metres wide, 12.1 metres long and 12.1 metres high. There are 40 blue snakes painted at the top of the temple.

== Renovation ==
In 2015, the temple was renovated as a part of Eduljee Dinshaw Road project. The façade of the temple was brought from India and during the renovation the dimensions of the temple were kept intact. The temple was then inaugurated by Sindh Governor Dr Ishratul Ibad on 13 December 2015.

== Religious significance ==
The temple is dedicated to Darya Lal (Jhulelal) who is an incarnation of Varuna Deva. The temple also hosts Lord Hanuman and Lord Ganesh. According to Gowswami Vijay Maharaj (caretaker of the temple), the temple hosts Lord Hanuman because when Hanuman flew to Lanka to save Sita from the clutches of Ravana over the sea, he was flying so fast that the Varuna Deva mounted his makara and asked who he was. After that every devotee who comes to worship Varuna Devta also pays their respects to Hanuman.
