= Saeedabad Tehsil =

Administrative subdivision in the Sindh province of Pakistan

Saeedabad Sindh سعیدآباد
- Tehsil
- New Saeedabad
- Country: Pakistan
- Province: Sindh
- District: Matiari

Government
  - Assistant Commissioner: Abdul Shakoor Solangi
- Time zone: UTC+5 (PKT)
- Postal code: 70100
- Area code: 022

New Saeedabad Tehsil (Urdu: نیو سعيد آباد) is an administrative subdivision (Tehsil) of Matiari District in the Sindh province of Pakistan.

New Saeedabad was declared a Tehsil on April 4, 2005, when District Matiari established on the bifurcation of Hyderabad district. The town is named after Saeed Khan Rind, a local notable and landowner who played a significant role in the area's early development. The name "New Saeedabad" was adopted in his honor.
