= Detha railway station =

Railway station in Pakistan

Rehimabad Detha Station دیتہ ریلوے اسٹیشن ڏيٿا ريلوي اسٽيشن

General information
- Coordinates: 25.4050°N 68.4395°E
- Owner: Ministry of Railways
- Line: Karachi–Peshawar Railway Line

Other information
- Station code: DET

History
- Opened: 1896

Services
Preceding station	Pakistan Railways	Following station
Hyderabad Junction towards Kiamari	Karachi–Peshawar Line	Khatian Road towards Peshawar Cantonment
Location

Detha Railway Station (Urdu: دیتہ ریلوے اسٹیشن, Sindhi: ڏيٿا ريلوي اسٽيشن) is located in Detha village, Hyderabad district of Sindh province, Pakistan.

Detha community belongs to Cāraṇa caste in hindu religion. Detha people live in Pakistan and also in India. In India, they are densely populated in Barmer, Jaisalmer, Nagaur (particularly in navad, tosina, kuchaman etc).

== See also ==
- List of railway stations in Pakistan
- Pakistan Railways
