= Hala (King George Island) =

Plateau in the South Shetland Islands

- Location within South Shetland Islands Location within Antarctica

Highest point
- Coordinates: 62°09′00″S 58°28′59.99″W

Geography
- Location: King George Island

Hala (Polish pronunciation: [ˈxa.la]) is a plateau on the King George Island, in the archipelago of the South Shetland Islands. It is located near the Panorama Ridge, the Krzesanica cliff, and the Henryk Arctowski Polish Antarctic Station.

== Name ==
It was named Hala in 1980 by the scientists of the Polish expedition. It was named after hala, a Polish-language term for alpine tundra.
