= Halla, Estonia =

Village in Estonia

Halla
- Location within Estonia
- Coordinates: 57°44′58″N 27°10′38″E
- Country: Estonia
- County: Võru County
- Municipality: Võru Parish

Population
  - Total: 7

Halla is a village in Estonia, in Võru Parish, which belongs to Võru County.
