= Shrine at Odero Lal =

Mandir Masjid

Odero Lal Shrine اوڈیرو لال درگاہ اڏيرو لال درگاه
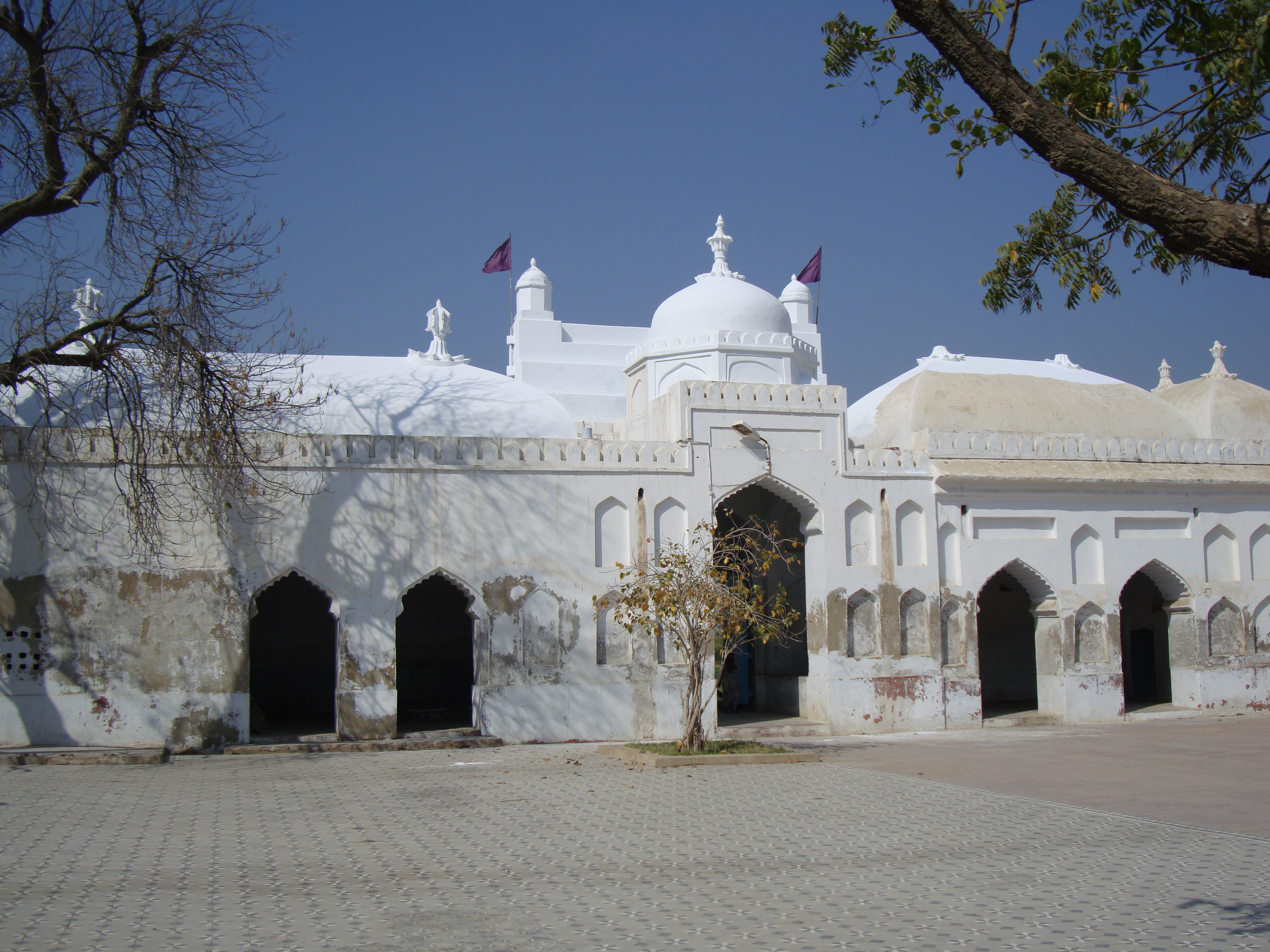
- Uderolal Teerath Asthan

- Location within Sindh Location within Pakistan

Religion
- Affiliation: Hinduism
- District: Matiari
- Province: Sindh
- Leadership: Sain Preetam Das (Gadi Nasheen)

Location
- Location: Odero Lal Village
- Country: Pakistan
- Coordinates: 25.7013347°N 68.5614382°E

Architecture
- Type: Sufi mausoleum and Hindu Temple
- Style: Indo-Islamic, Sindhi Hindu
- Completed: 1684 C.E.

The Shrine at Odero Lal (Urdu: اوڈیرو لال درگاہ; Sindhi: اڏيرو لال درگاه), also spelt Udero Lal, is a joint Muslim-Hindu shrine located in the village of Odero Lal, near the city of Tando Adam Khan in the Pakistani province of Sindh. The shrine is notable as it is jointly used for worship by members of both faiths, while both communities also display reverence for the nearby Indus River at the shrine.

== Etymology ==
According to the Hindu tradition, the Oderolal is derived from the Sanskrit word udo which means water.

== Background ==
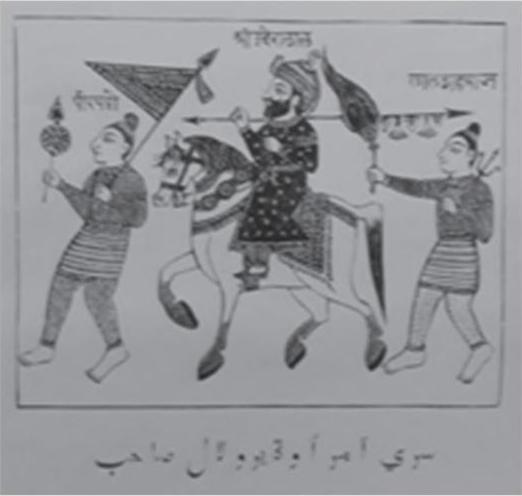
Equestrian depiction of Udero Lal (Jhulelal), alongside Pir Patho and Lal Shahbaz, published in Janam Sakhi Shri Amar Udero Lal Sahib (Karachi, 1923)

Sindhi Hindus consider Oderolal as Jhulelal, who is considered as incarnation of Lord Varuna. There are two versions related to Oderolal's birth. First one is by the 19th-century historian Bherumal Meharchand Advani’s Sindhi Boli Ji Tareekh, which states that Oderolal was born in the year 1007 as per Sindhi Hindu calendar in Nasarpur. His birth is celebrated as Cheti Chand. The second one is mentioned in Hussain Badshah’s Hyderabad Ji Tareekh and Advani’s Qadeem Sindh. It mentions that during the 10th century, Mirrikh Shah, the ruler of Thatta, attempted to forcibly convert Hindus. So the Hindus prayed along the banks of the Indus river for 40 days. On the 40th day, a young horse-rider appeared, instructing them to tell Mirrikh Shah to stop his oppression. According to Advani’s first version in Sindhi Boli Ji Tareekh, forty years later, a boy named Oderolal in Nasarpur which is seen as the fulfillment of divine intervention.

According to the research by Michel Boivin, the story is similar, except that when they prayed at the Indus banks for 40 days, a voice came from the river which said a miraculous child will be born. And in 1008, Uderolal was born in Naserpur. The child had miraculous powers and Mirrikh Shah sent his vizier to investigate it who confirmed it. In one narration, Udero Lal sprung from the Indus with his army which frightened Mirrikh Shah and he renounced his plan to forcibly convert Hindus. He also became a disciple of Oderolal. Similarly both Hindus and Muslims in the region became disciples of Oderolal. Since his duty is completed he told his cousin Pugar to take the leadership of the Daryapanth, river sect, and disappeared. On that site, Hindus build a Samadhi and Muslims built Qabr. According to another narration, after the disappearance of Oderolal, Mirrikh wanted to build a tomb as per Islamic custom for him, but Hindus wanted to build Samadhi. A debate happened between both, suddenly heavy rain started pouring and a voice came from the sky saying " Behold, make my shrine acceptable to both, Hindus and Muslims; let its one part be like a temple and the other part be like a Dargah (shrine). I belong to all of you".

For Hindus the shrine forms the seat of the Daryapanthis, originally a sub-sect of the followers of Gorakhnath, who belong to the Nath tradition. Daryalal is another name of Jhulelal. Both communities also refer to the saint by the alternate and religiously-neutral term Zinda Pir, or "The Living Saint."

Sindhi Muslims believe the saint interred at the shrine is Sheikh Tahir and while some believe its Khwaja Khizr. While some other accounts it as Shah Jandho.

The complex is home to both a Muslim shrine and Hindu temple. The joint arrangement was devised as a compromise to stem any conflict that might arise regarding the final religious rites for the corpse.

== Architecture & Worship ==
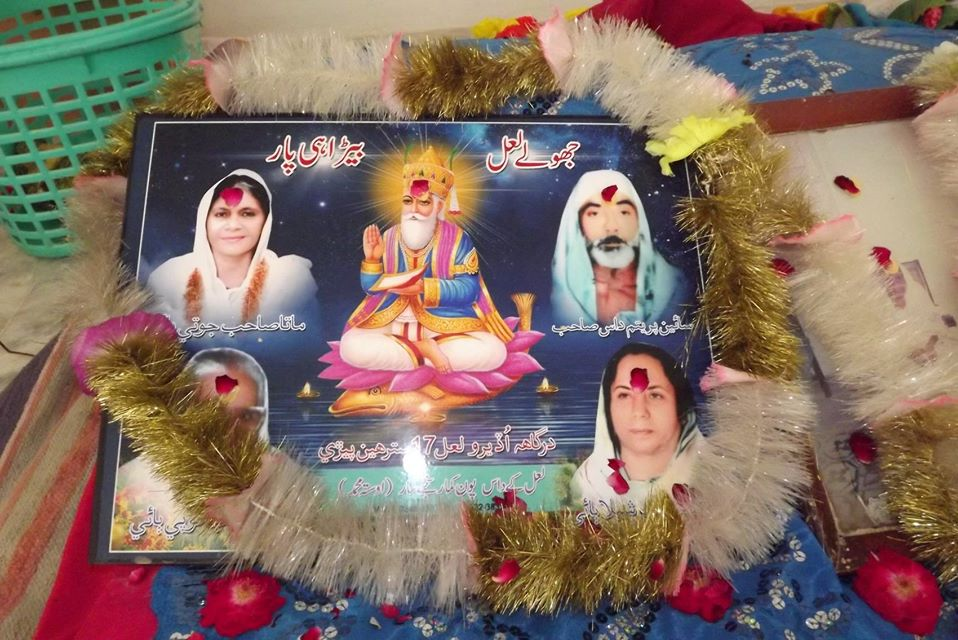
Iconography of Jhulelal at the shrine

There is a temple and a mosque in the shrine. Outside the shrine is a temple dedicated to Lord Shiva, which has a well.The hindu pilgrims take bathe from the water from this well as water is considered to purify soul as per Hindu beliefs.

The shrine caretakers hail from both the Muslim and Hindu communities. In the evening, Muslims offer namaz prayers at the shrine while Hindus perform aarti and puja prayers. At the temple, a lamp is kept burning perpetually. On the appearance of the new moon, Hindus light lamps and worship the shrine deity, an avatar of Varuna at the nearby river, or other water bodies, with rice, sugar-candy, spices and fruits.

== Significance ==
=== For Muslims ===
According to Muslim caretaker of the shrine, Sheikh Tahir was born as a Hindu by the name of Odero Lal (alternatively spelled Udero Lal), but converted to Islam as a teenager. Odero Lal in his youth was said to have been attracted the attention of a Sufi saint from Multan, whose association then lead Odero Lal to convert to Islam and adopt the name Sheikh Tahir.

=== For Hindus ===
Hindus commonly refer to Odero Lal as Jhulelal. According to Hindu tradition, a tyrannical ruler named Mirkh Shah from nearby Thatta ordered that local Hindus convert to Islam within 24 hours. Local Hindus, fearful of this edict, prayed at the banks of the Indus River, where they then saw a vision of the Hindu deity Varuna who informed the worshippers that he would re-incarnate himself as an infant to be born in Naserpur in order to deliver them from their hardships.

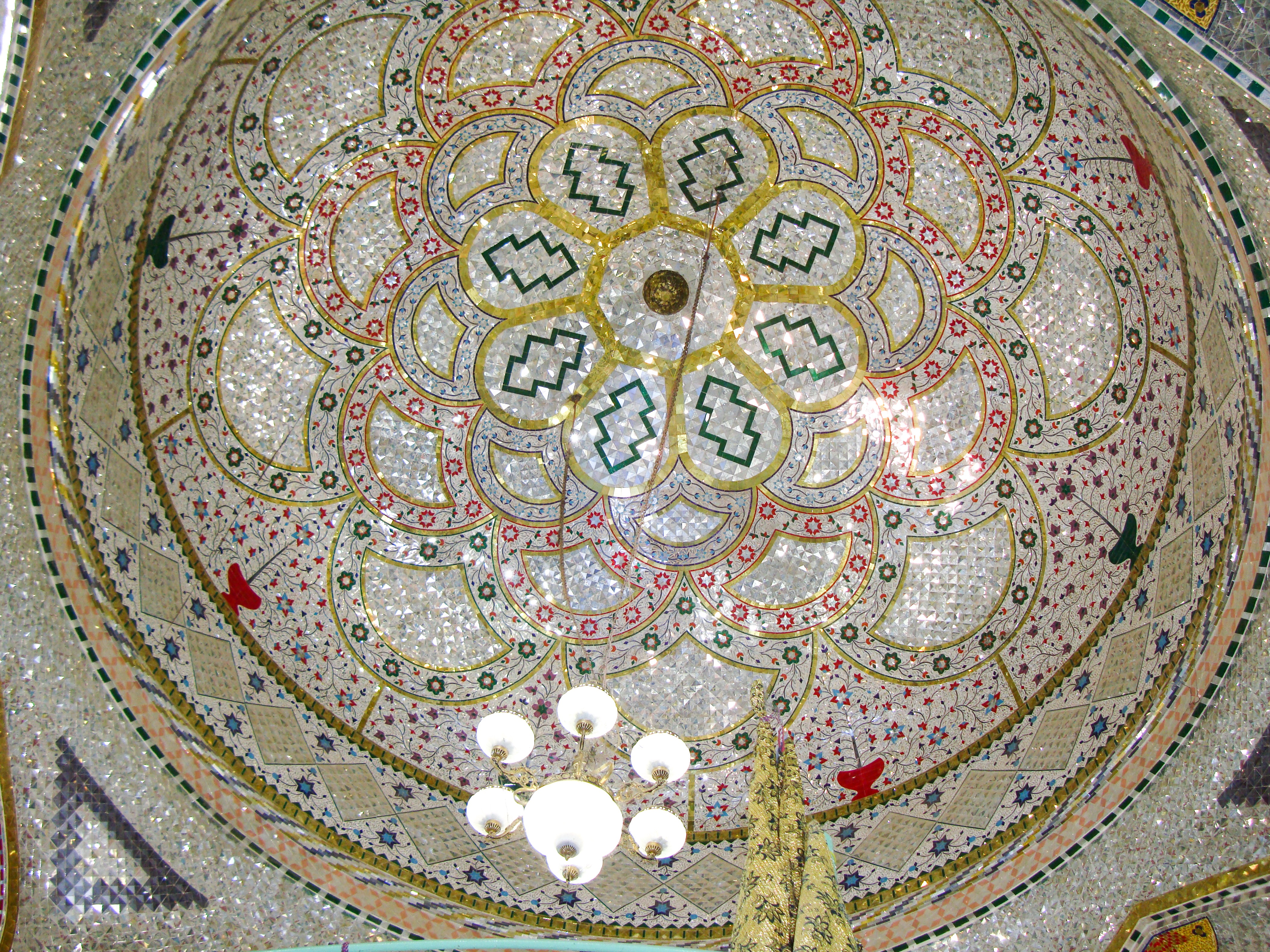
The underside of the shrine's dome is decorated with mirror-work known as ayina kari.

The baby Jhulelal was then born on the first day of the Hindu month of Chaitra. Upon hearing of the infant's birth, Mirkh Shah commanded a Hindu minister named Ahirio to kill the infant with a poisoned rose petal. When Ahirio saw the infant, Jhulelal smiled and the poisoned rose petal blew out of Ahirio's possession. When Ahirio caught sight of Jhulelal for a second time, he was startled to see that the infant had grown into an elderly man. The elderly man was then said to have turned into a young man, and then a warrior on horseback before Ahirio's eyes.

Ahirio returned to recount the story to Mirkh Shah, who then lambasted Ahirio, and told him to leave and call out for Jhulelal in villages and by the banks of the Indus River. Upon calling for Jhulelal, the warrior on horseback appeared out of the river to appear to Ahirio with an accompanying army. Terrified, Ahirio begged Jhulelal to restrain his army. Jhulelal's army then disappeared back into the river, while Ahirio went back to the palace to recount the story to Mirkh Shah. Mirkh Shah remained skeptical, but invited Jhulelal to his court with intent to forcefully convert Jhulelal. Jhulelal is then said to have vanished, leaving Mirkh Shah enraged. Mirkh Shah then ordered that all Hindus immediately convert to Islam. The Hindus then rushed to the house in Nasirpur where Jhulelal was born, and found Jhulelal there as an infant. The infant consoled the distraught Hindus and commanded them to assemble at a temple near the Indus River. Upon assembling, a firestorm broke out and engulfed Mirkh Shah's palaces. The king escaped to the banks of the river, where he found Jhulelal, now again a warrior, and his Hindu followers protected from the firestorm. The king fell at Jhulelal's feet, and Jhulelal dismissed the storm with the movement of his hand.

Jhulelal is also believed by Sindhi Hindus to have performed miracles, such as entering the Indus river at Nasirpur, and coming up at Bukkur, at the northernmost extent of Sindh.
