= Hallas =

Hallas is a surname. Notable people with the surname include:

- Derek Hallas (1934–2025), English rugby player
- Duncan Hallas (1925–2002), British politician
- Eldred Hallas (1870–1926), British politician
- Graeme Hallas (born 1971), British rugby player

== See also ==
- Hällas, a Swedish rock band
- Halla (disambiguation)
