= Hala (taxi) =

== History ==
Hala is a joint venture e-hailing taxi service between Dubai's Roads and Transport Authority (RTA) and Careem. It was officially launched in September 2019 to integrate Dubai's traditional taxi services into an app-based booking ecosystem, allowing customers to book licensed taxis digitally while maintaining regulated fare structures.

As part of reforms to Dubai's taxi booking infrastructure, the Roads and Transport Authority (RTA) migrated taxi e-hailing services from call centres to the Hala platform in December 2019. This transition followed Hala reaching one million bookings shortly after its launch, consolidating digital taxi bookings under a single system.

== Operations ==
Hala operates by connecting users with government-licensed taxis through Careem's e-hailing infrastructure. Trips booked through the platform follow existing taxi regulations and fare systems set by transport authorities. The service initially operated with around 2,000 taxis and expanded to approximately 5,500 vehicles by mid-September.

By September 2024, the service had expanded to include approximately 24,000 drivers and 12,000 vehicles. The platform also introduced booking options via WhatsApp, enabling users to request taxis through messaging-based reservations across Dubai.

== Growth and expansion ==
The service recorded a 36% rise in trips and a 21% increase in new users in September 2023, reflecting growing adoption of digital taxi booking services.

By the first half of 2025, Hala's market share had increased by 2.5%, accounting for 41.3% of approximately 59.5 million taxi rides recorded across Dubai.

In November 2025, Hala partnered with Fujairah Transport Corporation to expand its operations via the Careem application into Fujairah and Dibba through a pilot phase.

== Fleet and services ==
As part of fleet modernisation efforts, Hala introduced electric taxi models, including BYD, Skywell, GAC Emkoo, and Tesla vehicles. By February 2025, the fleet included approximately 13,000 taxis, with around 90% hybrid vehicles and nearly 500 electric vehicles.

Electric vehicle trips were reported to have reduced carbon emissions in Dubai's transport sector, supporting sustainability initiatives within the city's mobility network.

== Customer savings ==
Customers using Careem Plus subscriptions have reported savings on Hala taxi rides through cashback benefits credited to in-app wallets.

== Rebrand ==
In October 2025, Hala underwent a brand refresh aimed at updating its visual identity and positioning within Dubai's transport ecosystem.
