= Halas (food) =

Yemeni delicacy

Halas (Arabic: حلص, romanized: Ḥlṣ) is a Yemeni food made of halaṣ leaf. The food is eaten during drought periods in Yemen.

The halaṣ leaves have a very bitter taste but they are boiled in water until the taste is gone. It is then added to traditional buttermilk known as ḥaqin.

Ḥalaṣ is often confused with halqa or ghulaf (Cyphostemma digitatum (Forssk.)), which, according to Lisan al-Arab, is a plant that grows in Yemen whose leaves are similar in shape to vine leaves. It is roasted and dried, then used over meat. Halqa is used in traditional Yemeni ethnomedicine.

In 2018, people of the Yemeni town of Tihamah have survived by eating halaṣ due to the famine in that area.

== Etymology ==
The name of Ḥalaṣ is mentioned in Yemeni poems and proverbs. The latter include "People have starved until they ate Ḥalaṣ" and "Even if I ate Ḥalaṣ, I will not left it up".

According to Mutahar al-Iryani, a Yemen historian and poet, the term Ḥalaṣ came from the word Ḥalaḏ̣ (ḥlẓ), mentioned in ancient Yemeni inscriptions; it means to suffer from starvation, sickness or pain.
