= Palijani railway station =

Railway station in Pakistan

Palijani Railway Station پالی جانی ریلوے اسٹیشن پليجاڻي ريلوي اسٽيشن

General information
- Coordinates: 25.5671°N 68.5586°E
- Owner: Ministry of Railways
- Line: Karachi–Peshawar Railway Line

Other information
- Station code: PJL

Services
| Preceding station | Pakistan Railways | Following station |
|---|---|---|
| Allahdino Sand towards Kiamari | Karachi–Peshawar Line | Oderolal towards Peshawar Cantonment |
Location

Palijani Railway Station (Urdu: پالی جانی ریلوے اسٹیشن, Sindhi: پليجاڻي ريلوي اسٽيشن) is located in Palijani village, Matyari district of Sindh province of the Pakistan.

== See also ==
- List of railway stations in Pakistan
- Pakistan Railways
