= Oderolal railway station =

Railway station in Pakistan

Oderolal Railway Station اڈرولال ریلوے اسٹیشن اڏيرو لال ريلوي اسٽيشن

General information
- Coordinates: 25.6297°N 68.5960°E
- Owner: Ministry of Railways
- Line: Karachi–Peshawar Railway Line

Other information
- Station code: ODL

History
- Opened: 1896

Services
Preceding station	Pakistan Railways	Following station
Palijani towards Kiamari	Karachi–Peshawar Line	Wahab Shah towards Peshawar Cantonment
Location

Oderolal Railway Station (Urdu: اڈرولال ریلوے اسٹیشن, Sindhi: اڏيرو لال ريلوي اسٽيشن) is located in Matiari district of Sindh province of the Pakistan. A small town exists around it. Odero Lal has a high school, a degree college. There's a local farmers market where local produce is delivered to be sold.

== See also ==
- List of railway stations in Pakistan
- Pakistan Railways
