= Bhitshah =

Town in Sindh, Pakistan

Coordinates: 25.802°N 68.492°E

Bhit or Bhit Shah (Sindhi: ڀٽ شاهه) is a small town located in Matiari District, Sindh, Pakistan. The town is best known as the location of the shrine to the Sindhi Sufi poet Shah Abdul Latif Bhittai, who came to be called Bhittai (Sindhi: ڀٽائي, of Bhit) on account of the town's name (the town is also known as Bhit Shah due to this connection). Passing along the road that leaves Hala for Hyderabad, beyond the shrubs there are a solitary group of large white mounds, which form hills known as Bhit in Sindhi.

== Shrine of Abdul Latif Bhittai ==
The Shrine of Shah Abdul Latif Bhittai, located in the centre of the town, was built by Mian Ghulam Shah Kalhoro, who ruled over Sindh during the late 1700s. Kalhoro ordered the shrine to be built in 1772. It is a structure covered with traditional Sindhi Kashi tiles, glazed in the colours such as blue and turquoise. The shrine complex contains the tombs of Shah Latif himself, his father Shah Habib, his female relatives, and his Khalifah Tamar Faqeer.The final resting place of Shah Latif is under the main-dome of the building. His grave is enclosed by a carved wooden screen and lies under a fresco. Musicians are often seen serenading the constant trickle of devotees who visit the saint. On Thursday evenings, locals gather around to remember the Sufi saint, by reciting his poems and playing music. The Urs of Shah Latif is celebrated in the Islamic month of Safar.

== Museum ==
Located close to the shrine is the small Bhit Shah Museum which houses exhibits of folktales mentioned in Shah Abdul Latif Bhittai's best known work, Shah Jo Risalo. These include Sohni Mehar and Umar Marui.

== University ==
Located close to the shrine is the a University is started temporarily within the premises of the Degree College, the University of Sufism and Modern Sciences, Bhitshah is currently operating its academic activities. A fully functional and purpose-built campus is under construction to provide modern facilities and an enhanced learning environment for students.
