= Ameen Faheem =

Pakistani politician

- امين فہیم
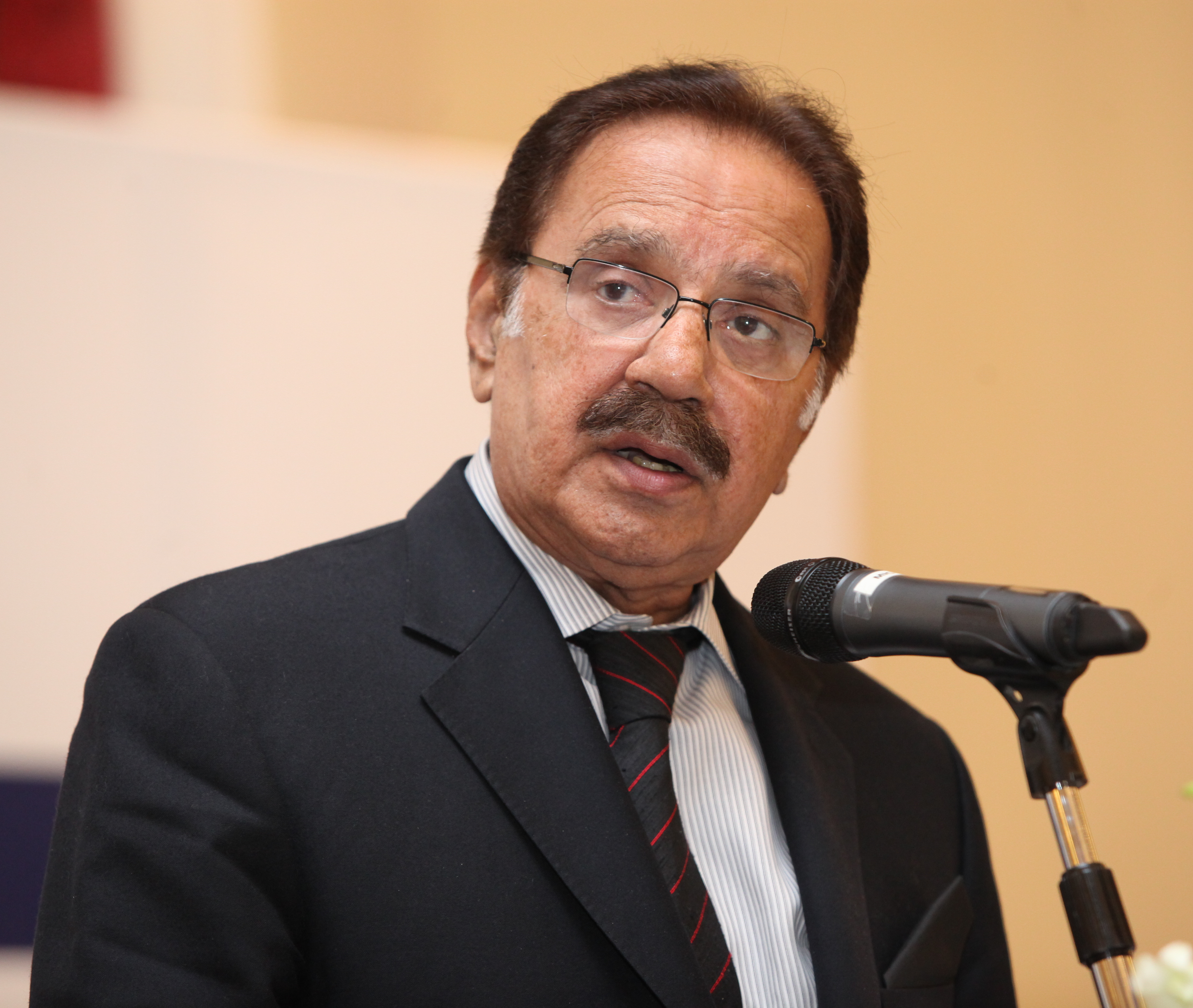
- Faheem at the Horasis Global Arab Business Meeting in 2012

Minister of Commerce and Chambers
- In office 3 November 2008 – 16 March 2013
- President: Asif Zardari
- Prime Minister: Yousaf Raza Gillani; Raja Pervez Ashraf
- Preceded by: Mubashir Hassan

Personal details
- Born: Makhdoom Muhammad Ameen Faheem; 4 August 1940 Hala, Sind, British India
- Died: 21 November 2015 (aged 75) Karachi, Sindh, Pakistan
- Cause of death: Leukemia
- Resting place: Hala, Sindh, Pakistan
- Party: Pakistan Peoples Party
- Spouse: Nelofar
- Children: Makhdoom Jameeluz Zaman (son); Makhdoom Shakil uz Zaman (son); Makhdoom Aqueel uz Zaman (son); Makhdoom Najib Zaman (son); Makhdoom Naimatullah (son); Makhdoom Habibullah (son); Maliha Makhdoom (daughter); Makhdoom Sindhyar (son); Dr Maahroo Makhdooom (daughter); Dr Shahroo Makhdooom (daughter); Shazia Arshad Khan (daughter)
- Parent: Makhdoom Zaman Talib-ul-Mola (father)
- Education: University of Sindh

Makhdoom Muhammad Ameen Faheem (Sindhi: مخدوم محمد امين فھيم;Urdu: مخدوم محمد امین فہیم; alt. spelling: Amin Fahim; 4 August 1940 – 21 November 2015) was a Pakistani populist left-wing political figure and poet. He was the senior vice-chairman of Pakistan Peoples Party, chairman of Pakistan People's Party Parliamentarians and former chairman of Alliance for Restoration of Democracy.

Earning Bachelor of Science in political science from the University of Sindh in 1961, he started his political activism in 1970 and contested successfully the 1970 general elections and was a close ally of Benazir Bhutto during the 1990s. He was the spiritual figure of the Sarvari Jama'at as well as the prominent Sufi in his native province, Sindh. After successfully contesting the 2008 general elections, he notably stepped down for the candidacy of prime minister office in favour of Yousaf Raza Gillani.

== Early and personal life ==
=== Family roots and early years ===
Makhdoom Muhammad Ameen Faheem was born in Hala in Sindh, which is located 200 km off the southern port city of Karachi, on 4 August 1940. His father, Makhdoom Muhammad Zaman was the 17th spiritual leader of Sarwari Jammat and as well a powerful feudal figure in the province. His father was one of the prominent 67 participants who laid the foundation of the Pakistan Peoples Party where he was made the senior vice-chairman of the party and PPP was founded at his house in Hala, Sindh. Makhdoom Muhammad Zaman 'Talib ul Mola' successfully contested the 1970 general elections and stepped into the national parliament as a member of parliament (MP). Makhdoom Muhammad Zaman was also offered many high-ranking posts in the time of General Muhammad Zia-ul-Haq, but he refused and chose to stay in Hala and look after his Sarwari Jamaat.

=== Education and early career ===
Amin Fahim completed his primary education in 1955 from Hala and did matriculation from a local high school in his native town Hala, in 1957. After passing the university entrance exams, Fahim enrolled in the University of Sindh as an undecided major and declared his major in 1958 at the department of social sciences. Faheem declared his major in political science and gained a Bachelor of Science (with honours) in political science from the University of Sindh in 1961.

=== Spirituality ===
Makhdoom Amin Fahim was also the leader of the largest spiritual group of people called the "Sarwari Jamaat" in Pakistan, consisting of millions of people across the world.

It was recorded that Sarwari Jamaat consisted of 900,000 people, 300 years ago and was titled as the 'No Lakhi Gadi' which means the Gaddi of 900,000 disciples.

=== Relationships and children ===
He was once married to Dina, elder sister of famous Bangladeshi singer Runa Laila who later died due to cancer. He was married thrice. He had 9 sons and 3 daughters from different wives.

== Political career ==
=== Early career with the PPP ===
During the popular wave of Pakistan Peoples Party for the 1970 general election, Faheem joined the party as the junior member. He successfully contested the elections, securing his NA-Thatta constituency in Sindh. He served in the Sindh Assembly on PPP platform, working on human rights affairs and educational development.

=== Rise to prominence ===
Since then, he has contested eight elections from elections held in 1977, 1988, 1990, 1993, 1997, 2002, 2008 and 2013, remaining undefeated and creating a national record. Makhdoom Amin Fahim, however, boycotted the non-party elections of 1985 held by General Muhammad Zia-ul-Haq-led military regime in line with the decision of his party. In 1993 he contested as MPA and MNA, and was the only Parliamentarian in Pakistan to win both seats unopposed. After that he gave up the MPA seat to his younger brother and he even came unopposed on it.

Makhdoom was offered the post of Prime Minister in 2002 by then President Gen. Pervez Musharraf, keeping in mind his party's leader Benazir Bhutto's refusal to appoint Amin Fahim's son Makhdoom Jameel Zaman as the Chief Minister Sindh, though he was offered the post of Prime Minister thrice before 1988–1990 and 1993. He remained loyal to his party and did not accept offers from then Prime Minister Nawaz Sharif and the military dictators. Makhdoom Amin Fahim was the senior vice-chairman of PPP, and was also the Parliamentary Leader, (President) of the same party in the National Assembly. He was twice the Federal Minister in tenure of Benazir Bhutto. He was Communications Minister from December 1988 to August 1990, Railways Minister from December 1988 to March 1989. In the next tenure, he was Minister for Housing and Works from January 1994 to November 1996.

=== Career after Benazir Bhutto assassination ===
Makhdoom Amin Fahim was mentioned as a possible chairman for the PPP, in the wake of the 27 December 2007 assassination of Benazir Bhutto, but Bilawal Bhutto Zardari and Asif Ali Zardari were named party co-chairs and he was considered the party's probable candidate for Prime Minister. However, the PPP hesitated to name Makhdoom as its candidate following its victory in the February 2008 election. It was suggested that Benazir Bhutto's widower Asif Ali Zardari, might be reluctant to nominate Makhdoom Amin Fahim as prime minister, because he was worried that Faheem could strengthen his political base in Sindh and threaten the influence of the Bhutto family there.

On 15 March 2008, Makhdoom Amin Fahim said that he did not understand why the PPP had still not named him as its candidate. According to Faheem, if Zardari wanted to take the position for himself, he would support him.

Later, the PPP nominated Yousaf Raza Gillani as Prime Minister on 22 March 2008. Although this was viewed as a snub to Amin Fahim, he said that he would not leave the PPP and had the "best wishes" for Gillani. Amin Fahim, however, was made the Commerce Minister of Pakistan in November 2008 shuffle as a consolation.

== Other interests ==
=== Poetry ===
Initially, Makhdoom Amin Fahim was more interested in poetry than politics. However, he had no choice but to jump into the fray as the political heir of Makhdoom family.

He once said, "Poetry is my first love. I am still fond of saying verses and reading poetry of others. His forte is mystic poetry. His poetry speaks about love, Peace, and simplicity."

"I have always been fond of the poetry of Maulana Rumi, Shah Abdul Latif Bhittai, and Sachal Sarmast. Their poetry has left a deep impact on my life. I have learned from them (Poets) to be loyal, to be loved, in good or rainy days."

He further said, "I don't believe in ruling the people. I believe in ruling their hearts. That is why my voters love me, and they never disappointed me."

== Death ==
Faheem died on 21 November 2015 from leukemia after being admitted to a hospital in Karachi, Pakistan under ICU at the age of 76.
