= Makhdoom Muhammad Zaman Talibul Moula =

Pakistani politician, scholar and poet

Personal details
- Born: 4 October 1919 Hala, Bombay Presidency, British India
- Died: January 11, 1993 (aged 73) Karachi, Sindh, Pakistan

Makhdoom Muhammad Zaman Talibul Moula (4 October 1919 – 11 January 1993; Sindhi: مخدوم محمد زمان طالب المولا) was a Pakistani politician, scholar and poet. He was the 17th Sajjadah Nasheen of Ghous-ul-Haq Makhdoom Sarwar Nooh Shrine best known "Sarwari Jammat" in Hala. He was born on October 4, 1919, in New Hala. He is the father of Makhdoom Muhammad Amin Fahim and Makhdoom Saeeduz Zaman.

Makhdoom Talib ul Mola became the Sajjadah Nasheen after the death of his father Makhdoom Ghulam Muhammad. His Shrine is famous as No lakhi Godri. His family had some 1 million followers 300 years back, but the number expanded to around 6 million people during his time.

He was also a politician and was the senior vice chairman of Pakistan Peoples Party. He was among founding members of PPP and the party was found in his house at Hala in 1967. He was elected as the Member of the National Assembly many times and played role in the movements of MRD and ani-One Unit.

Makdoom Talib ul Mola was also a famous Sindhi poet, and was chairman of Sindhi Adabi Board. He wrote many books and articles in Sindhi Magazines. He died on January 11, 1993, at Cardio Vesicular Institute, Karachi. He is buried at Hala.

== Awards ==
He was awarded Tamgha-e-Pakistan, Latif Award and Hilal-e-Imtiaz for his achievements and works.

== Books ==
His prose & poetry work contains more than 30 books, published ones are given as under;

1. Bahar-e-Talib (poetry 1946)
2. Rubaiyat-e-talib (Poetry 1949)
3. Khud Shanasi (prose 1949)
4. Shaitaan (Prose 1951)
5. Islami tasawwuf (Prose 1951)
6. Imam Ghazali ja Khutt Selected (Translation 1953)
7. Durr-e-Nayab urf Yaad-e-Raftagan (Collection of Poets from all over the Sindh 1953 & 1993)
8. Kachkoal (Poetry in Sindhi, Persian, Urdu, Siraiki 1955)
9. Shan-e-Serwari (Poetry NAATs 1958)
10. Kaafi (Poetry Kafi/Abiyaat 1962)
11. Chappar mein Charriyoon (poetry Kafi/Abiyaat 1971)
12. Sindh Jo Sanwann (Poetry )
13. Deewan-e-Talib-ul-Mola (Poetry 1982)
14. AA Kanga Kar GGalh (Poetry 1982)
15. Hala ja Makhdoom Aeen Shah Sahib (Prose)
16. Sham-o-Subah (Poetry 1982)
17. Mathanavi-e-Aql-o-Ishq (poetry 1955 & 1983)
18. Be-Peer Ankhiyoon (Poetry in his own writing 1987)
19. Misri joon Tarroon in English & Sindhi (Prose Quotes 1990)
20. Sada Waseen Sindhrri (Poetry 1990)
21. Lughat-e-Sindhi Mukhaf'fifaat (Dictionary of Contractions 1991)
22. Aab-e-Hayaat (Poetry 1991)
23. Chuhunddrriyoon (Poetry 1992)
24. Intikhab-e-kalaam-e-Talib-ul-Mola (Poetry in his own writing 1993)
25. Muhunjo Nandhpann (Autobiography+additions 1993)
26. Baharistaan (Poetry 1994)
27. mazameen-e-Talib-ul-Mola (Prose Different Columns written in Newspapers & Magazines 1994)
28. Shan-e-Hussain (Poetry 2004)

== See also ==
- Makhdoom Ameen Faheem
- Hala, Sindh
