= Makhdoom Lutufullah =

16th-century Sindhi poet Saint

Makhdoom Nooh Siddiqui
- مخدوم نوح

Personal life
- Born: 1506 CE, 911 Hijri; Hala, Tarkhan dynasty (now Sindh, Pakistan)
- Died: 1590 CE (aged 84); Sindh, Tarkhan dynasty (now Sindh, Pakistan)
- Parent: Makhdoom Naimatullah Siddiqi (father)
- Main interest(s): Sindhi, Persian, poetry

Religious life
- Religion: Islam
- Movement: Suharwardi

Makhdoom Nooh Siddiqui (Sindhi: مخدوم نوح), was a Sindhi-language poet and wali. He was an Islamic scholar and a member of the Suharwardi Sufi tariqa. He wrote a famous Persian-language translation of the Quran.

A monument dedicated to him is located in Hala, Sindh, known as Dargah Sarwar e Nooh Siddiqui.
