= Hala Tehsil =

- Tehsil
- Country: Pakistan
- Province: Sindh
- District: Matiari District

Government
  - Nazim: Syed Ghous Ali Shah
- Time zone: UTC+5 (PST)

Hala Tehsil (Sindhi: هالا تعلقو) is an administrative subdivision (Tehsil) of Matiari District in the Sindh province of Pakistan. As of the 2017 census, Hala Taluka has a population of 262,423. The rural population is 143,965 and urban population 118,458. Hala City is the headquarter of this Tehsil. Important towns/villages of this taluka include Hala old, Bhit Shah, Panj Moro, Khandu and Bhanoth.

Tehsil Hala comprises following six Union Councils:

- Bhanoth
- Bhitshah
- Hala - I
- Hala - II
- Hala - III
