= Hala, Sindh =

Hala ہالا (Sindhi)
- City
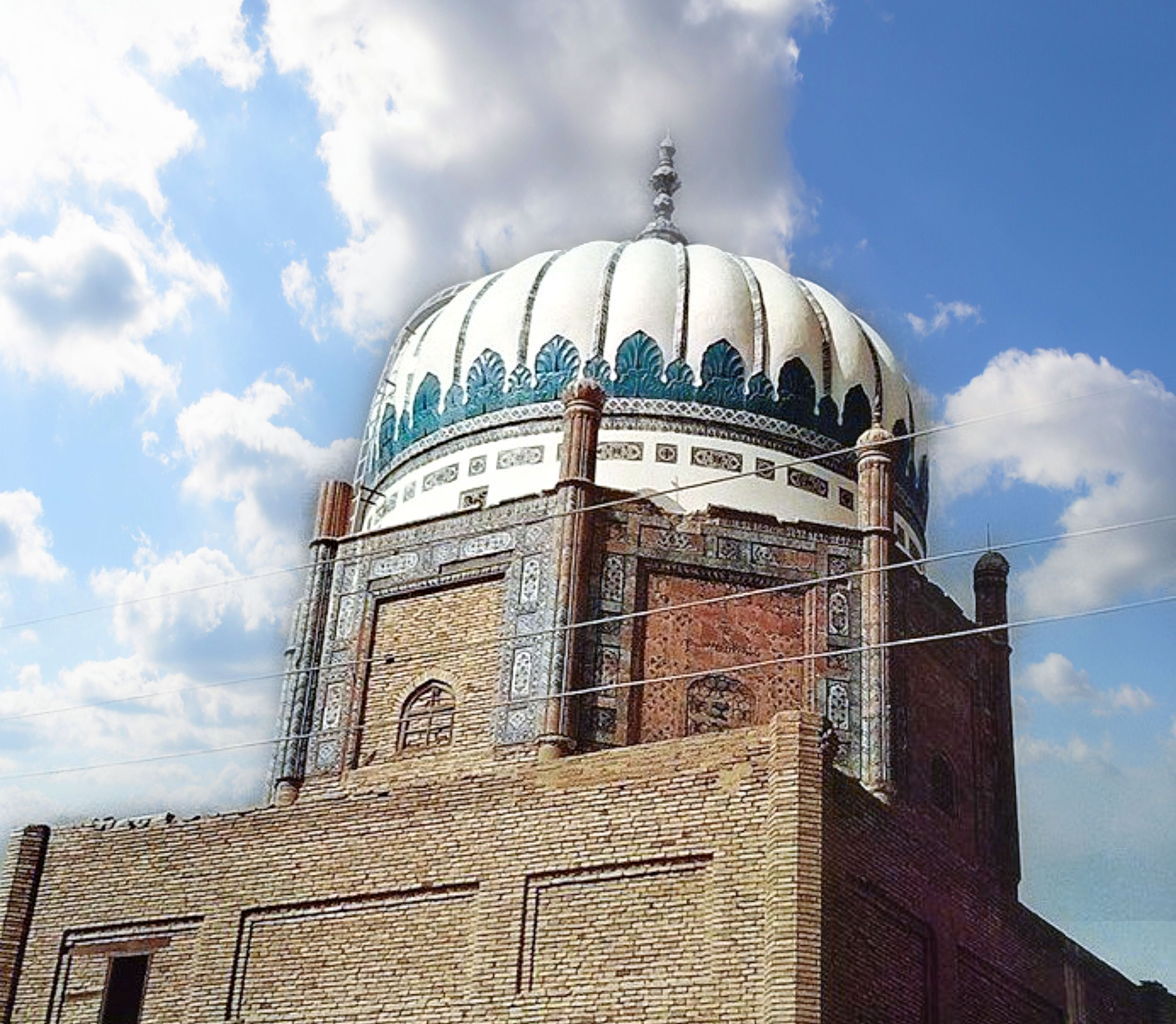
- Dargah Pir Sarhandi

- Location within Sindh Location within Pakistan
- Coordinates: 25.81°N 68.43°E
- Country: Pakistan
- Province: Sindh
- Elevation: 39 m (128 ft)

Population (2023)
  - Total: 71,094
- Time zone: UTC+5 (PST)
- Website: Official Site

Hala (Sindhi: هـالا, Urdu: ہالا) is a city and taluka of Matiari district of Sindh, Pakistan. According to the Revenue record, Hala was given the status of Taluka of Hyderabad District in 1848. In 2005, it became part of Matiari District. Hala is located on the N-5 National Highway of Pakistan at a distance of about 62 kilometers from Hyderabad. Hala is also located on the Tando Adam - Mehrabpur Railway Line but that railway line has been discontinued by Pakistan Railways. As of the 2023 census, the Hala Municipal Corporation has a population of 71,094. The total population of Hala Taluka is 286,155 (2023) which includes Hala Municipal Corporation, Hala Old, Bhit Shah, Bhanote and surrounding areas.

Hala is famous through the subcontinent for art, glazed colored pottery (Kaashi), woodwork (Jandi), cloth printing, woven cloth (Sussi) and khaddar made on handmade khaddi.

== Demographics ==
Census	Population
1972	18,282
1981	23,877
1998	40,377
2017	65,780
2023	71,094

Languages

Languages of Hala city (2023 Census)
1. Sindhi (87.1%)
2. Urdu (7.70%)
3. Punjabi (0.90%)
4. Balochi (0.70%)
5. Others (3.60%)

== Sufism ==
Hala became a leading centre of the Suhrawardi sect of Sufism from the 16th century onwards. It contains the mausoleum of Makhdum Nuh (died circa 1592), a Suhrawardi Pir, which attracts pilgrims. Renowned Scholar, poet and politician Makhdoom Muhammad Zaman Talibul Moula and his son Makhdoom Muhammad Amin Faheem also belong to this city. In the vicinity of Hala there is another mausoleum of the famous Sufi poet Hazrat Shah Abdul Latif Bhitai at Bhitshah at the distance of 5 km from Hala City. Bhitshah Town is a sub-office of Taluka Municipal Administration Hala.
