= Matiari =

Matiari (مٽیاري)
- City
- Matiari
- Location within Sindh Location within Pakistan
- Coordinates: 25°35′45″N 68°26′45″E
- Country: Pakistan
- Province: Sindh
- Division: Hyderabad
- District: Matiari
- Elevation: 19 m (62 ft)

Population (2017)
  - City: 21,195
- Time zone: UTC+5 (PST)

Matyari or Matiari (Sindhi: مٽیاري, Urdu: مٹیاری) is a city located in Sindh, Pakistan. It is 30 km (19 mi) north of Hyderabad on N-5 National Highway. Matiari is also the district headquarter of Matiari District.

The Dargah of Pir Sayed Sakhi Hashim Shah Badshah, Shah Abdul Latif Bhittai, Makhdoom Sarwar Nooh and Sardar Ahmed Shah Lakiari are located in Matiari district.

Matiari has three talukas; Matiari, Hala and Saeedabad.

Matiari is known for its ice-cream and Ajrak (traditional Sindhi printing on cloth). Its city Hala is famous for handicraft such as Ajrak, Kashi, Jandi and embroidery. City of Matiari has been a major hub for trade since the 90s, for the local population of Matiari district.

Located in Central Sindh, its agricultural land is one of the most fertile lands in Sindh, with banana as being one of the major crops farmed here. Sugarcane is also cultivated heavily in the district, but the cotton production has decreased gradually over the last 20 years. Due to lack of water in River Indus, the local farmers have resorted to installing Solar Tube Wells to farm their lands. Many have started farming Bananas, with its farms also being one of the most high yielding.

Map of the district showing its National Assembly Seat

== Etymology ==
Matiari word is derived from two Sindhi words Mat and yari, which means friendship with earthen water pots.

G.M Syed states regarding origin of the word Matiari:

Sometime back a pious man who was entirely given to the worship of God, used to serve travelers who came for a drink, for which, purpose he kept a pitcher full of water. For this reason this village known "Mat Waru Goth" (The Village of the Pitcher) later came to be known Matyari.
