= Matiari District =

Coordinates: 25°36′00″N 68°26′24″E

Matiari District: ضلعو مٽیاري; ضلع مٹیاری
- District of Sindh
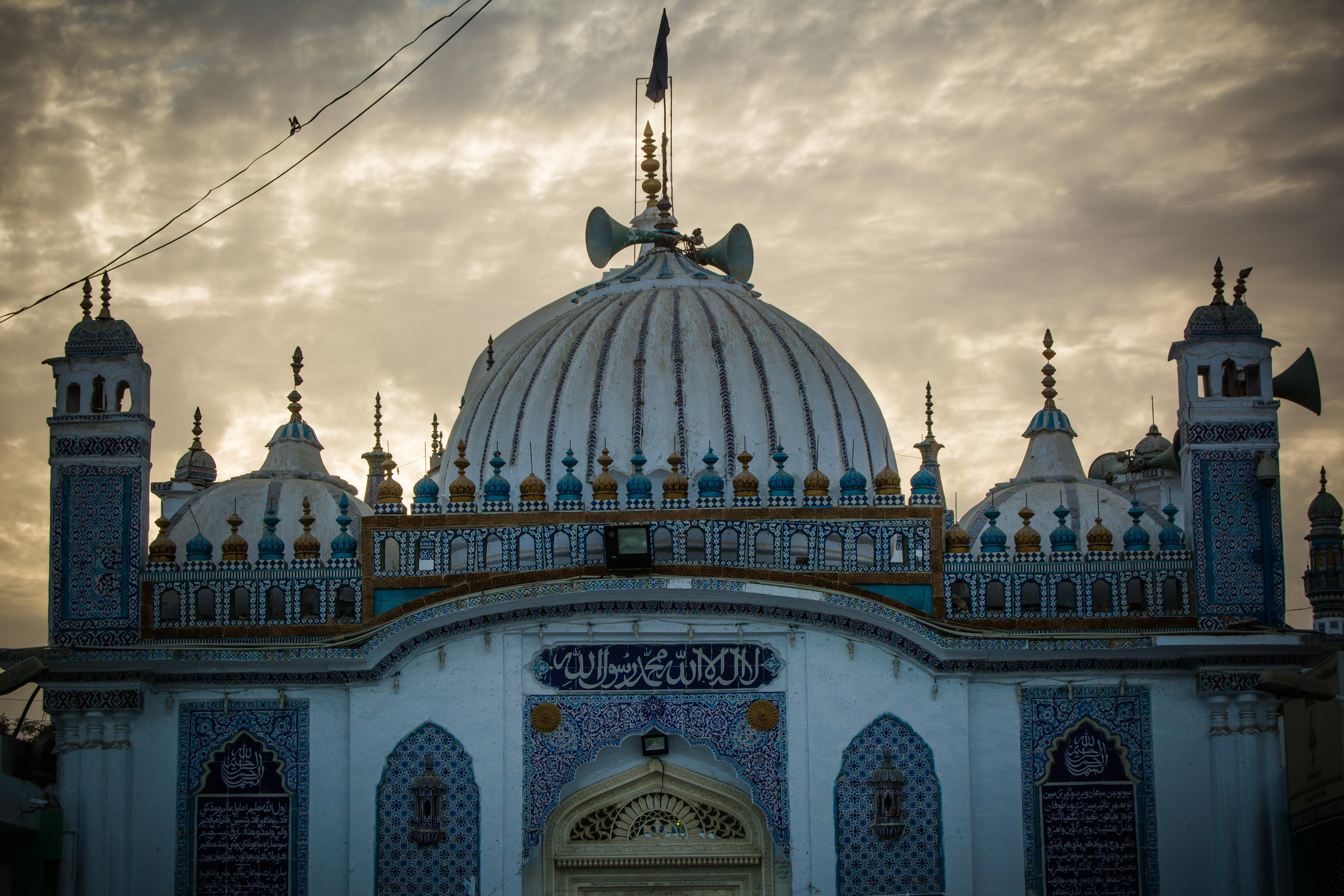
- Shrine of Shah Abdul Latif Bhittai

- Map of Sindh with Matiari District highlighted
- Country: Pakistan
- Province: Sindh
- Division: Hyderabad
- Established: 30 May 2004
- Headquarters: Matiari

Government
  - Type: District Administration
  - Deputy Commissioner: N/A
  - District Police Officer: N/A
  - District Health Officer: N/A

Area
  - District of Sindh: 1,417 km^{2} (547 sq mi)

Population (2023)
  - District of Sindh: 849,383
  - Density: 599.4/km^{2} (1,552/sq mi)
  - Urban: 202,673
  - Rural: 646,710

Literacy
  - Literacy rate: Total: 45.88%; Male: 56.34%; Female: 35.12%
- Time zone: UTC+5 (PKT)
- Number of Tehsils: 3
- Website: http://www.matiari.net/

Matiari District (Sindhi: ضلعو مٽیاري, Urdu: ضلع مٹیاری) is a district of central Sindh locally called the Vichol Region of Sindh province of Pakistan. Located on the left bank of the Indus River, Matiari became an independent district on 30 May 2004 during the military regime of Pervez Musharraf, when Hyderabad was divided into four districts — Tando Allahyar, Matiari, Tando Mohammad Khan and Hyderabad.

== Etymology ==
The name Matiari is traditionally associated with the Sindhi expression "Mut Waree", meaning "the place where water pots are kept.

According to local tradition, the name Matiari originated from the practice of keeping water pots outside a local resident's home for passersby. Syed Meyoon Haji placed several water pots outside his residence so that passersby could drink water. People gradually began referring to the settlement as "Mut Waree", meaning "the place where water pots are kept. This is apparently why it the district is called Matiari.

== History and administration ==
Matiari district was carved out of Hyderabad district along with Tando Allahyar and Tando Muhammad Khan districts in 2005. Matiari district is part of the Hyderabad division. The district is administratively subdivided into three talukas:

- Hala Taluka
- Matiari Taluka
- Saeedabad Taluka

There are 30 union councils in the district as tabulated below:

| UC No. | Name | UC No. | Name | UC No. | Name | UC No | Name | UC No. | Name | UC NO. | Name |
|---|---|---|---|---|---|---|---|---|---|---|---|
| 1 | Matiari | 6 | Bau Khan Pathan | 11 | Oderolal Village | 16 | Bhanoth | 21 | Makhdooman Jon Landhiyoon | 26 | Bhaledino Kaka |
| 2 | Jiandal Kot | 7 | Palijani | 12 | Nobat Marri | 17 | Khandu | 22 | Karam Khan Nizamani | 27 | Sikenderabad |
| 3 | Shah Alam Ji Wasi | 8 | Oderolal Station | 13 | Sher Muhammad Thorra/Kheber | 18 | Fateh Muhammad Shah Ajnani | 23 | Shahmir Rahu | 28 | Zair Peer |
| 4 | Shahpur/ Arif Khatian | 9 | Bau Dero | 14 | Faqir Nooh Hothiani | 19 | Ajan Shah | 24 | Faqirabad | 29 | Abdul Wahid Borero |
| 5 | Tajpur | 10 | Sekhat | 15 | Muhammad Hussain Hingoro | 20 | Bhit Shah | 25 | Saeedabad Old | 30 | Muhammad Ramzan Unar |

== Demography ==
Historical population
| Year | Pop. | ±% p.a. |
|---|---|---|
| 1951 | 124,948 | — |
| 1961 | 148,995 | +1.78% |
| 1972 | 336,367 | +7.68% |
| 1981 | 438,319 | +2.99% |
| 1998 | 494,244 | +0.71% |
| 2017 | 770,040 | +2.36% |
| 2023 | 849,383 | +1.65% |

As of the 2023 census, Matiari district has 158,463 households and a population of 849,383. The district has a sex ratio of 102.58 males to 100 females and a literacy rate of 45.88%: 56.34% for males and 35.12% for females. 266,740 (31.41% of the surveyed population) are under 10 years of age. 202,673 (23.86%) live in urban areas.

Religions in Matiari district (2023)
| Religion | Percent |
| Islam | 81.67% |
| Hinduism | 18.03% |
| Other | 0.3% |

Religion in contemporary Matiari District
| Religious group | 1941 (Note: 1941 census data is for Hala taluka of erstwhile Hyderabad district, which roughly corresponds to the present district. District and taluk borders have changed since then.) | | 2017 | | 2023 | |
| Religious group | Pop. | % | Pop. | % | Pop. | % |
|---|---|---|---|---|---|---|
| Islam | 91,744 | 78.67% | 641,297 | 83.28% | 693,625 | 81.67% |
| Hinduism | 24,343 | 20.87% | 128,267 | 16.66% | 153,170 | 18.03% |
| Others (Note: Including Jainism, Christianity, Buddhism, Zoroastrianism, Judaism, Ad-Dharmis, or not stated) | 528 | 0.46% | 476 | 0.06% | 2,556 | 0.30% |
| Total Population | 116,615 | 100% | 770,040 | 100% | 849,351 | 100% |

The majority religion is Islam, with 81.67% of the population. Hinduism (including those from Scheduled Castes) is 18.03% of the population. Members of other religions are largely Christians.

Languages of Matiari district (2023)
1. Sindhi (93.0%)
2. Urdu (2.66%)
3. Others (4.41%)

At the time of the 2023 census, 92.95% of the population spoke Sindhi, 2.66% Urdu and 4.42% spoke other various languages as their first language.

== Notable places ==
The shrines of Pir Rukun-Din-Shah, Makhdoom Sarwar Nooh, Shah Abdul Latif Bhittai, Sakhi Hashim Shah pir Haider shah, Muhammad Faquir Khatian and others are located in Matiari district. Miani forest and the battleground of Sir Charles Napier and Talpur rulers of Sindh and Miani jo Maidan are also situated in Matiari district.

Syed Rukun-Din-Shah also fought a battle with the Arguns dynasty with seven bilalis of sindh.

At Khuda aabad, one can find the graves and the tombs of Mughal Empires era. There is a Masjid (Praying Place) and a well of water.

The Indus River is also there.

== Agriculture ==
Matiari district is one of the most fertile districts of Sindh. The main crops cultivated are cotton, banana, mango, wheat, onions and sugarcane.

== Politics ==
The elected representatives from Matiari district are

- MNA Makhdoom Jameel-uz-Zaman (PPPP) NA 223
- MPA Makhdoom Mehboob Zaman (PPPP) PS 58
- MPA Makhdoom Rafique Zaman (PPPP) PS 59

== List of union councils ==
The following is a list of Matiari District's union councils, organised by Tehsils:

- Hala Tehsil (35 Dehs)
  - Bhanbhri
  - Bhanoth
  - Bhit Shah
  - Bundh
  - Bunglow
  - Bureri
  - Char
  - Dhabri
  - Gahoth
  - Gaib peer
  - Ghoghat
  - Ghotana
  - Hala
  - Hala old
  - Jamlabad
  - Jhirki
  - Kalri
  - Katcho Khanoth
  - Keeriya
  - Khandu
  - Khanoth
  - Kutkai
  - Lakhisar
  - Narli
  - Nizamani
  - Nooralabad
  - Noorketi
  - Pir Bilawal
  - Rechal
  - Rojhani
  - Salaro
  - Sandhan
  - Shaikhani
  - Tarah
  - Verato
- Matiari Tehsil (49 Dehs)
  - Abrejani
  - Arain
  - Barechani
  - Baudero
  - Bhanoki
  - Bhorko
  - Buhryoon
  - Chharao
  - Dhando
  - Ganag Rayati
  - Gang Jagir
  - Hakra
  - Jaheki
  - Kaindal Kot
  - Jakhri Jagir
  - Jakhri Joya
  - Jakhri Rayati
  - Ketti
  - Khorkhani
  - Khudi
  - Khyberani
  - Koheki
  - Lutryoon
  - Mari
  - Matiari
  - Mubarak Wah
  - Nindero
  - Oderolal
  - Palijani
  - Panhwarki
  - Pano
  - Porath
  - Reechal
  - Sadri
  - Saeedpur
  - Sahib Saman
  - Sattar
  - Sekhat
  - Shahpur
  - Sipki Jagir
  - Sipki Rayati
  - Sohiki
  - Soomra
  - Sultanpur
  - Tajpur
  - Thano
  - Thorha
  - Vesro
  - Wassan
- Saeedabad Tehsil (28 Dehs)
  - Ahano
  - Amin Lakho
  - Bawri
  - Chhachhri
  - Chhapar Kahan
  - Chitori
  - Dalo Keti
  - Dethki
  - Fatehpur
  - Gadali
  - Giss
  - Jamali
  - Kaka
  - Khatoori
  - Khuteero
  - Koonar
  - Larh
  - Manahi
  - Odiyanoo
  - Panjmoro
  - Peengharo Jagir
  - Peengharo Raieti
  - Rahoo
  - Rahooki
  - Ranoo
  - Saeedabad
  - Suhrabpur
  - Zairpir

== Bibliography ==
- 1998 District census report of Hyderabad. Census publication. Vol. 59. Islamabad: Population Census Organization, Statistics Division, Government of Pakistan. 1999.
