= Ali Kazi =

Pakistani journalist and television host

- علي قاضي
- Born: 1968 (age 57–58); Hyderabad, Sindh, Pakistan
- Education: University of Sindh
- Occupations: TV host, Journalist, Politician
- Known for: CEO and Founder of MUN TV, The Time News HD, editor Daily Pahenji Akhbar
- Political party: Tabdeeli Pasand Party Pakistan
- Relatives: Fahmida Mirza (Cousin)

Muhammad Ali Kazi also known as Ali Kazi (Sindhi: محمد علي قاضي, Urdu: محمد علی قاضی) is a Sindhi journalist and news anchor from Pakistan.

== Early life and education ==
He was born in a political and media business family of Hyderabad, Sindh and is the youngest son of Muhammad Akber Kazi, a former Home minister for the province of Sindh.

== Journalistic career ==
Ali Kazi is a senior journalist. He was editor of the Sindhi newspaper Daily Kawish and the CEO of the Sindhi private television Kawish Television Network (KTN). He had hosted a program aired on KTN News Opinion with Ali Kazi.

He started his journalistic career at the age of 21 years. In 1990, along with his elder brother Aslam Akbar Kazi, he launched Daily Kawish as a morning newspaper from Hyderabad. In 2002 Kawish group launched the first Sindhi language satellite channel KTN and Kazi became its CEO. This media group has now three channels; KTN News, KTN Entertainment and Kashish Music Channel.

== Social activities ==
Kazi called for Sindhi Topi Day to be celebrated on 6 December 2009 in response to criticism by TV anchor Dr Shahid Masood of the then President of Pakistan Asif Ali Zardari for wearing the Sindhi cap on foreign visits. The day was celebrated throughout Sindh.

In January 2010, during a dry season, Ali Kazi, along with other people, went on to throw flowers in Indus River and prayed for recovery of the dry river.

== Political activities ==
Ali Kazi began his involvement in politics on 22 January 2012, when he organized a huge public gathering in Bhit Shah, a little town of central Sindh near the Sindhi poet Shah Abdul Latif Bhitai's shrine. There he declared his plans to launch a political party with the slogan to bring change in the political system in favor of merit, good governance, equality, justice, and transparency. The party was named Tabdeeli Pasand Party. Kazi and his party failed to get voters confidence and Couldn't get even single seat in the election.

== See also ==
- Daily Awami Awaz
- Sindh TV
- Sindhi-language media
