= Sindhi Cultural Day =

Sindhi cultural festival

- Observed by: Sindhi people worldwide
- Liturgical color: maroon, red, black
- Type: Cultural
- Significance: Honors the heritage, culture and civilization of Sindh
- Celebrations: Sindhi folk dancing; Historical and cultural exhibitions; Rememberence of history of Sindh; Singing Sindhi folk songs and Sindhi poetry; Family and social gatherings
- Date: 1st Sunday of December
- Frequency: Annual
- First time: December, 06 2009

Sindhi Cultural Day (Sindhi: سنڌي ثقافتي ڏھاڙو) is a popular Sindhi cultural festival celebrated each year in the first week of December on the Sunday. It is celebrated with traditional enthusiasm to highlight the centuries-old rich culture of Sindh. It's widely celebrated all over Sindh, and amongst the Sindhi diaspora population around the world. Sindhis celebrate this day to demonstrate the peaceful identity of Sindhi culture and acquire the attention of the world towards their rich heritage.

Sindhi cultural day is celebrated worldwide on the first Sunday of December. On this occasion, people wear attires, Ajrak (traditional block printed shawl) and Sindhi Topi. During the festival, people gather in all major cities of Sindh at press clubs, and other places to arrange various activities. Literary (poetic) gatherings, mach katchehri (gathering in a place and sitting round in a circle and the fire on sticks in the center), musical concerts, seminars, lecture programs and rallies are held. Major hallmarks of cities and towns are decorated with Sindhi Ajrak. People across Sindh exchange gifts of Ajrak and Topi at various ceremonies. The children and women dress up in Ajrak, assembling at the grand gathering, where famous Sindhi singers sing Sindhi songs, which depicts the message of Sindh peace and love. The musical performances of the artists compel the participants to dance to Sindhi tunes and the national song, sung by Ahmed Mughal (Brother of Late Rehman Mughal) ‘Hea Sindh Jeay-Sindh Wara Jean Sindhi Topi Ajrak Wara Jean’.

All political, social and religious organizations of Sindh, besides the Sindh Culture Department and administrations of various schools, colleges and universities, organize a variety of events including seminars, debates, folk music programs, drama and theatric performances, tableaus and literary sittings to mark this annual festivity. On Sindhi culture day, history and heritage are highlighted at the events.

== History ==
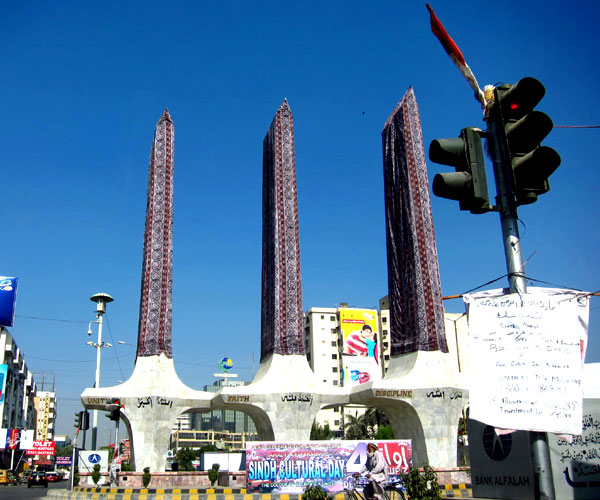
Karachi: Teen Talwar wrapped in Ajrak in connection with Sindhi Cultural day

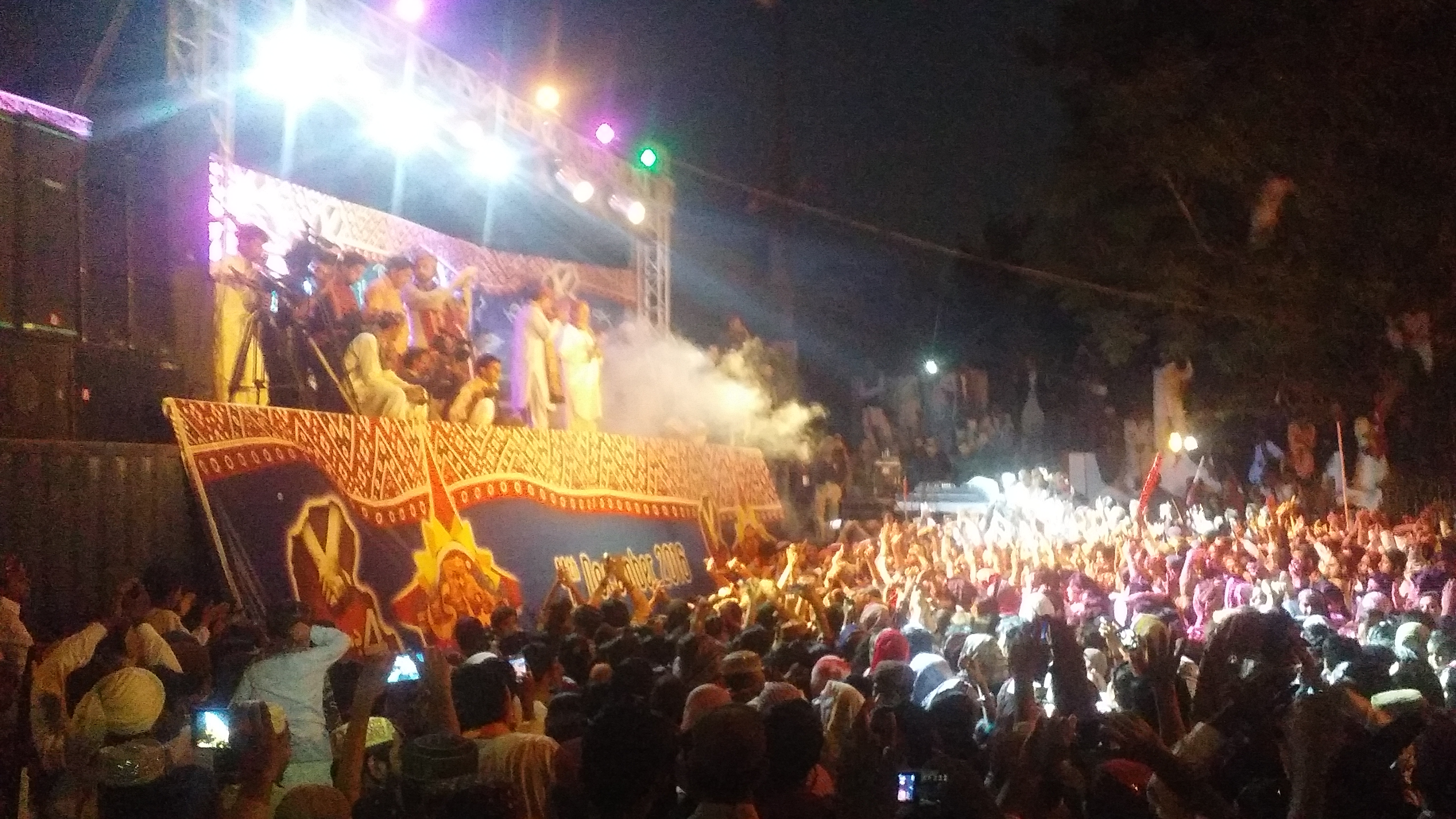
Sindhi Cultural Day 2016

Sindhi Cultural Day-VID

Sindhi Cultural day is observed to display solidarity among the Sindhi-speaking masses; the event is celebrated throughout Sindh and all over the world. The culture and heritage day was celebrated for the first time on 6 December 2009 (as the Sindhi Topi Day) as a backlash to the comments of anchorperson Dr. Shahid Masood who had criticized President Asif Ali Zardari for wearing a Sindhi cap on his foreign tours. People across the Sindh province condemned Masood’s comments via SMS, which ultimately resulted in the announcement of celebrating the Sindhi Topi Day. Ever since, Sindhi media groups have also started to celebrate the day as ‘Sindhi Cultural Day’. The Sindhi language TV channels including Time News, Sindh TV, Awaz TV and Mehran TV broadcast live and special programmes on the culture of Sindh, besides these media outlets separately arrange the mega musical events, which also attract large audiences to celebrate the culture day every year.

=== Timeline ===
This is the timeline of celebrations of the Sindhi cultural day.

==== 2009 ====
The first cultural day celebrations were held on 6 December 2009. Ali Kazi was the first to announce the celebration of the cultural day and all Sindhis endorsed his decision.

==== 2010 ====
Sindhi cultural day was celebrated in December 2010. Provincial government and Chief Minister of Sindh Syed Qaim Ali Shah announced it a public holiday.

==== 2011 ====
Sindhi cultural day was celebrated in December 2011. Government of Sindh in collaboration with media centers sponsored this event.

==== 2012 ====
Sindhi cultural day was celebrated in December 2012. A major gathering was held outside Karachi Press Club.

==== 2013 ====
Sindhi cultural day was celebrated in December 2013. The US Consulate in Karachi arranged a Qawali program on the occasion.

==== 2014 ====
Sindhi cultural day was celebrated in December 2014. The main event was arranged at Karachi Press Club.

==== 2015 ====
Sindhi cultural day was celebrated in December 2015. The US Consulate arranged a musical program at the Consul General’s residence.

==== 2016 ====
This year all Sindhi media including KTN and Sindh TV mutually celebrated cultural day on 4 December. Many people gathered at the Karachi Press Club, where a large stage was decorated with Pana-flexes.

The US Consulate General, Karachi celebrated the cultural day of Sindh. Bilawal Bhutto Zardari also celebrated in Lahore during his political program.

==== 2017 ====
Sindhi cultural day was celebrated in the first week of December, 2017 across Sindh and worldwide. The main event was held at Karachi Press Club where people from around the city gathered.

==== 2018 ====
Sindhi cultural day was celebrated on Sunday, 2 December 2018. The theme this year was Aekta (unity). People all across the province celebrated the day by arranging Ajrak stalls, cultural gatherings and rallies; main event in Hyderabad was arranged at Sindh Museum.

==== 2019 ====
In 2019, Sindhi Cultural Day was celebrated on 1 December. theme is "Our Unity Day". This day was celebrated by Sindhi communities all over the globe even people from different communities participate on this celebration. Sindhis celebrate this day as National Eid. In Sindh province people celebrate this day by leading rally, dancing and singing Sindhi songs. From school to universities, students, teachers & parents celebrate by performing skits, studying Sindhi history, art & culture. On other hand Sindhi media in association with Sindhi Culture Department broadcast Sindhi Cultural Shows and shows school's & college's functions live on television.

Largest and longest Sindhi Ajrak in the world was exhibited in Sukkur, Sindh and 130 meters and 20 feet Sindhi Ajrak was displayed in Hyderabad, on the eve of Sindhi cultural Day in 1 December 2019.

==== 2020 ====
Preparations

Sindhi Cultural Day was to be celebrated on December 6. Preparations for celebrating this day Sindhi people across the world especially from Sindh are engaged in purchasing traditional clothing; Ajraks and Sindhi Caps. Distinguished Sindhi personalities are leading people and arranging rallies from small to bigger towns of the province. Moreover, Native musicians/singers have released Cultural Day video Songs promoting and preserving culture, Ali Zafar, Urooj Fatima & Abid Brohi have produced 'Allay Muhinja Maruara', Ghulam Asghar Khoso has produced 'Jiye Jiye Muhenji Sohni Sindhrri Jiye' and 'Pehanjo Polly Phenjo Sindh' is produced by Shuja Haider.

Celebration

Today, 6 December, Cultural Day of Sindh was celebrated across the world as well as in Sindh.

==== 2021 ====
Sindh Cultural day was celebrated on the 1st Sunday of December, which meant 5 December 2021.

==== 2022 ====
In 2022, it was being celebrated on 4 December 2022.

== Traditional Attire ==
It is a common sight to see Sindhis covering themselves with the traditional attire while they celebrate the day. The most common two pieces of clothing regularly worn by Sindhis on this day include Ajrak and Sindhi cap. Both of these pieces hold a significant value among the locals as they are a symbol of pride, tradition, honor and respect for the culture.

== Gallery ==
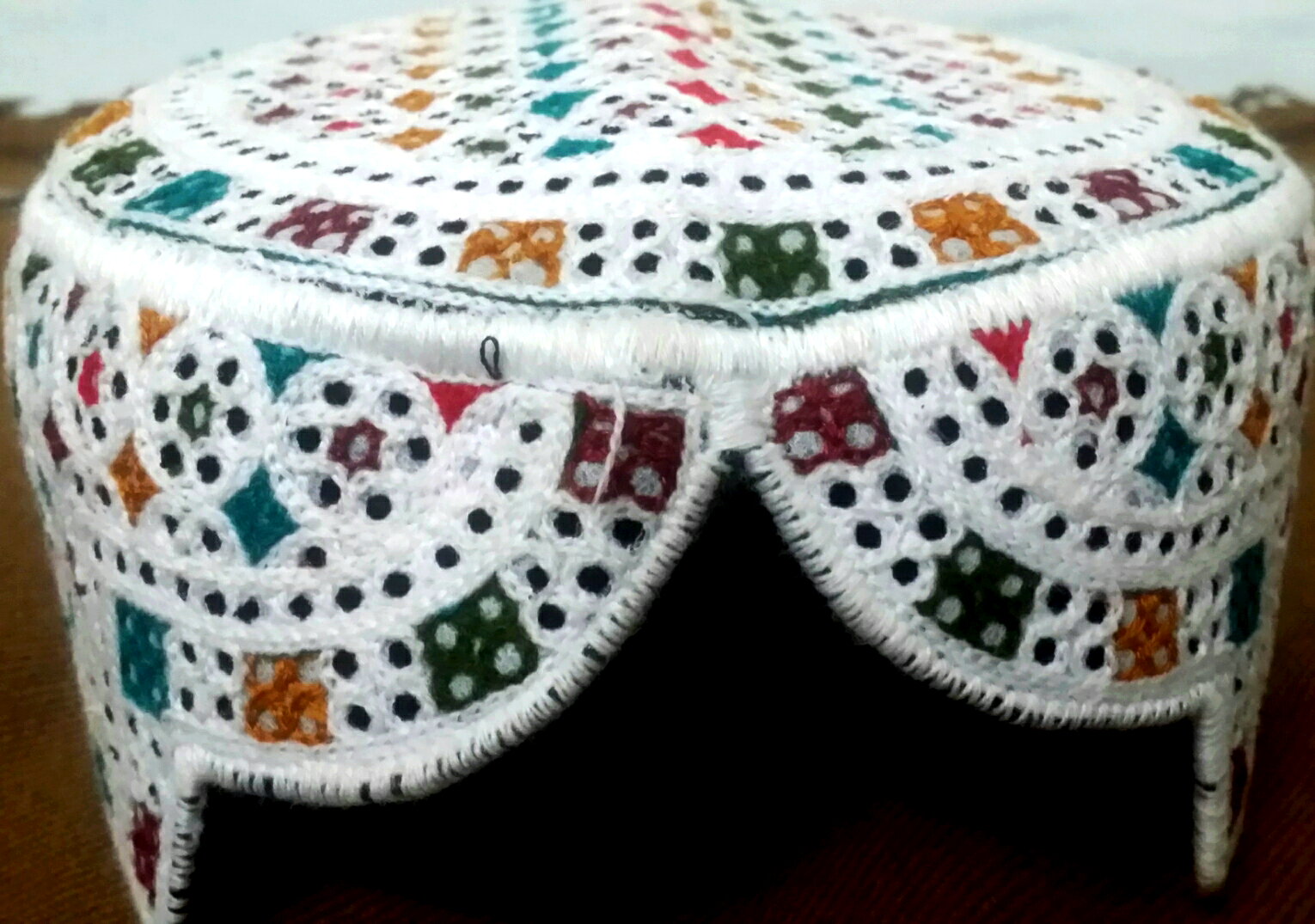
Sindhi cap front view

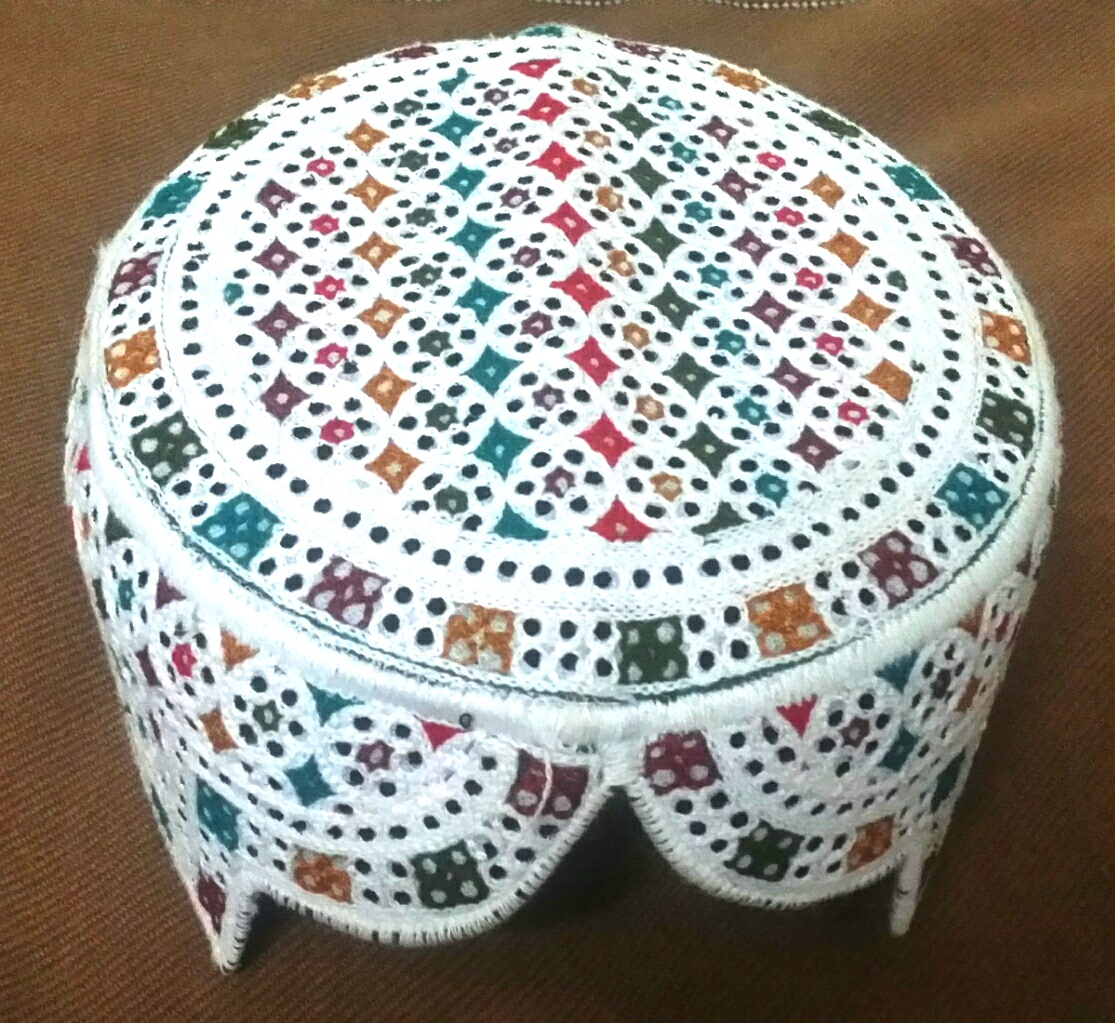
Sindhi Cap-Topview brighten

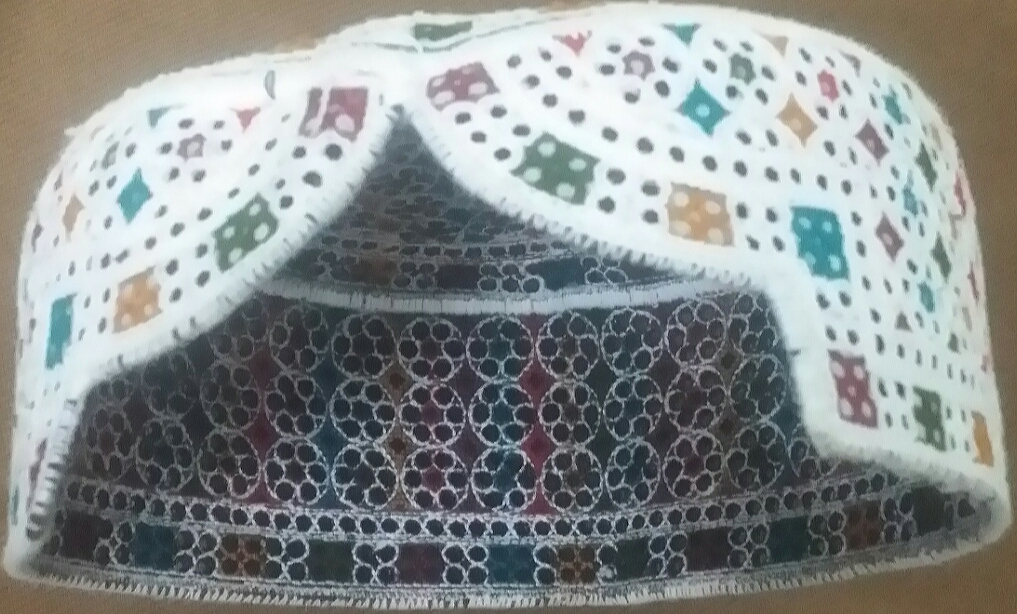
Sindhi Cap-Bottom front view

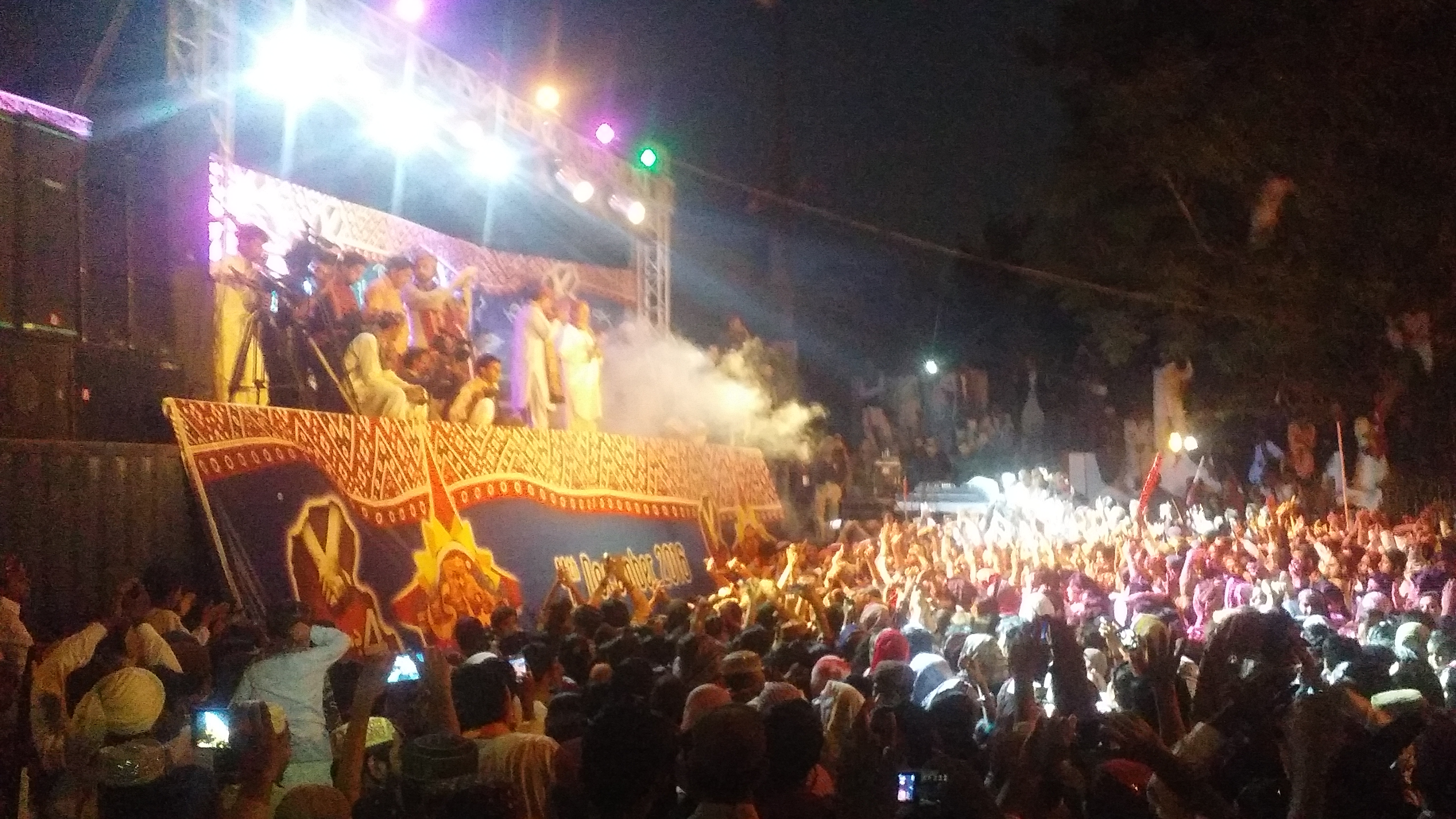
Sindhi Cultural Day 2016

Sindhi Cultural Day-clip

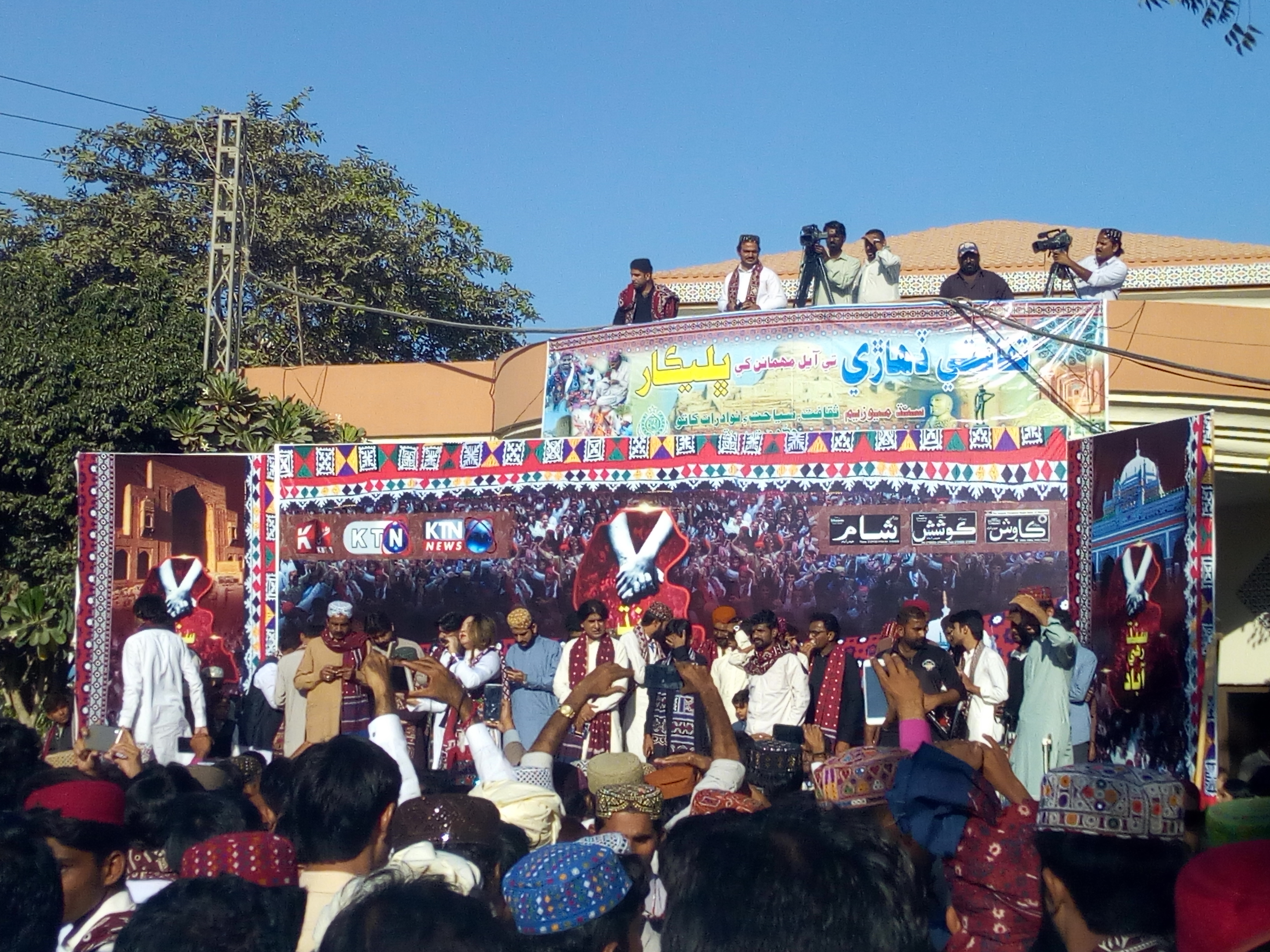
Sindhi Cultural Day 2019 celebrations at Sindh museum Hyderabad, Sindh

== See also ==
- List of Sindhi Hindu festivals
- Ajrak
- Culture of Sindh
- Punjabi Culture Day
- Sindhi cap
- Sindhi clothing
- Sindhi cuisine
