= Sindhi-language media =

Overview of mass media of Sindhi language

== Importance ==
Sindhi-language media has been said to cover issues ignored by the mainstream Urdu-language media in Pakistan; because Urdu media is the national transmission media, it gives coverage entirely to national issues beside focusing on global and international matters.

The government, recognising the importance of Sindhi media, decided to establish the Sindhi Media House in Karachi. The Habib University began teaching students Sindhi through Sindhi music and literature.

== Print media ==
The Sindhi language has long been used for communication. Sindhi printing began in 1848 and the first printed Sindhi book was published in 1858. Although 1836 is the earliest recorded date of printing, some facts show that it existed before then as well.

=== Newspapers ===
Newspapers constitute a major part of print media. Sindhi newspapers also developed as a result of Sindhi nationalism, specifically. There are a number of Sindhi-language newspapers, reflecting readers' interests. The most famous newspapers include Daily Kawish, Daily Awami Awaz, Daily Ibrat, Daily Nijat, Daily Sobh, Pehnji Akhbar, and Koshish.

The Sindhi-language media took an active part in the One Unit movement of 1954 in Pakistan; among those newspapers Al-Waheed, Daily Karvan and Daily Nayi Sindh were sanctioned. Nawa-e-Sindh was the only newspaper which favoured the One Unit.

=== Magazines ===
Sindhi magazines have also been a very popular medium among their readers. Not too many magazines are found in this language. All sorts of magazines including general interest, educational, and fashion are available in the language. Special children's editions are also published. Mehran is a popular magazine; others include Waskaro, Laat, and Gul Phul.

Aarsee

After separation from Awami Awaz, renowned journalist Sohail Sangi launched Weekly Aarsee (The Mirror) Sindhi magazine from Karachi. It was the first news magazine in Sindhi. It became so popular that English magazine Newsline carried a story on this new experience in Sindhi journalism. The team included Ajiz Jamali, Zahid Mirani, Rahim Bux Burq and Riaz Sohail. Due to its bold stand and financial constraints, the publication was closed down.

Other magazines include Kesooba Magazine and Affair News Magazine.

== Electronic media ==
=== History ===
Sindhi electronic media does not have a long history. It started in the 1970s when initially 25 minutes were given by Pakistan Television for programmes in regional languages in their respective provinces. For many years, the provincial languages were given 25-minute slots early in the evening, much earlier than prime time. PTV National broke the tradition of regional languages being given a few hours each – private channels came and changed the entire milieu.

KTN was the first private channel in Sindhi, followed by Sindh TV, Dharti TV, Mehran TV, KTN News, Sindh TV News, Awaz TV and music channel Kashish.

=== Radio channels ===
There are many FM radio channels which air programs in the Sindhi language. The Radio Voice of Sindh is based in London and features news and music. Radio Sindhi is run by the Sindhi diaspora scattered around the world.

=== Available channels ===
KTN started in September 2002 by the owners of Daily Kawish. It soon became one of the leading private channels. Sindh TV was launched in October 2004. Another channel named Kashish was started as a part of KTN network, and is basically a music channel which telecasts music videos round the clock. The existence of Kashish has made investors focus on more specified fields in this language. These channels do not outsource programming to private production companies and prefer self-production, which they deem much cheaper.

=== Available programming ===
As soon as specific channels started, a variety of programs have been telecast in the language. They possess a complete range of programs including news, talk shows, religious programs, dramas, songs and many more. Special programs for children are also presented. Most dramas are based on the routine life of the people. They usually portray the lives of the Sindhi people, especially those who are living in the interior.

On Kawish Television Network (KTN TV) a number of dramas including Zangiron, Dunya dardun gi, Har shakhs kahani aahe, Rang bhomi, Rishtan ji kahani, Fasla, Wanodni and talk shows like Diyo and Music on Demand (musical program) are telecasted. It is a 24-hour channel; in the evening new episodes are presented whereas the afternoon features re-telecast programs. Currently a show titled Kuch Reh Jeewiyal Pall has become popular. It is an Indian show dubbed in Sindhi and its popularity shows the enjoyment of high-quality Indian-made television content. It completed 100 episodes on Friday 4 May 2007.

Zalim, jar, and khushbo are popular dramas on Sindh TV. Public Demand and Your Choice are favourite musical programs. As the 1990s were a booming period in Urdu-language music, now in the same way many new singers with Sindhi songs are coming up. Babloo bablee, What do you know, Your choice, and Popat post man are the names of some of the programs telecast on Kashish. One advantage of the Sindhi channels is that a large number of new talents have found opportunities to express themselves better. Some Sindhi artists who have earned fame in Urdu-language media are also appreciated.

== Social media ==
Sindhi social media has evolved in recent decades and gives a voice to whose voice is unheard or ignored by other types of media. Various social sites are used such as Facebook, Twitter, as well as hojamalo.pk (ھوجمالو), a digital media magazine in Sindhi, and Mokhi Media the first Sindhi broadcasting and media production company.

== See also ==
- List of Sindhi-language newspapers
- List of Sindhi-language films
- List of Sindhi-language television channels
- Sindhi literature
- Sindhi poetry
