= Mazhar Sethar =

Pakistani actor, television presenter and director

- مظهر سيٺار
- Born: Sindh, Pakistan
- Education: MA (Sociology), Shah Abdul Latif University
- Occupations: Actor, television presenter, model, director
- Years active: 2008–present
- Known for: Ho Jamalo (KTN)
- Website: mazharsethar.com

Mazhar Sethar (Sindhi: مظهر سيٺار) is a Pakistani actor, television presenter, model and director. He began his career on the Sindhi-language channel KTN in 2008. He later moved to Dubai, where he has worked in television commercials and advertising campaigns. He hosts the KTN game show Ho Jamalo.

== Early life and education ==
Sethar grew up in a village in Sindh, where his father was a schoolteacher. He became interested in television as a child. He began making short productions, mostly interviews, with a borrowed camera. He studied sociology at Shah Abdul Latif University in Khairpur, where he earned a master's degree.

== Career ==
=== Pakistan ===
Sethar started his media career on KTN in November 2008, first as a talk show host. His first programme was KTN Top Ten. He later hosted programmes on KTN's sister channel Kashish TV, including K Select.

As an actor, he appeared in KTN solo plays, short drama serials and soap serials, and in plays on PTV National and Urdu-language channels. He had a major role in Madaar, a feature film produced by KTN.

Sethar also directed music videos and television commercials for local brands.

=== United Arab Emirates ===
Sethar later moved to Dubai. There he has appeared in television commercials, brand promotions, outdoor advertising campaigns and fashion projects. He acted in an Arabic-language web series modelled on the Squid Game format. He has also worked with international production houses and talent agencies, and on media projects for multinational companies and development organizations, including consultancies working for the World Bank and the United Nations.

=== Recent work ===
Sethar hosts Ho Jamalo, a game show on KTN with quiz segments and prizes. He is developing a podcast series on young role models from rural Pakistan. He has also run workshops for young filmmakers in Sindh.
