= KTN =

KTN may refer to:

== Television ==
- Kawish Television Network, Pakistan
- Kenya Television Network
- Korean Television Network, a subchannel of WKTB-CD
- Television Nagasaki, Japan

== Transport ==
- Kentish Town station, London, National Rail station code KTN
- Ketchikan International Airport, Alaska, US, IATA and FAA code KTN

== Other uses ==
- Knowledge Transfer Network, now Innovate UK, public body supporting new products and services
- Known Traveler Number for US Trusted Traveler Programs such as Global Entry
