= Hayat Ali Shah Bukhari =

Pakistani dramatist and journalist

Syed Hayat Ali Shah Bukhari
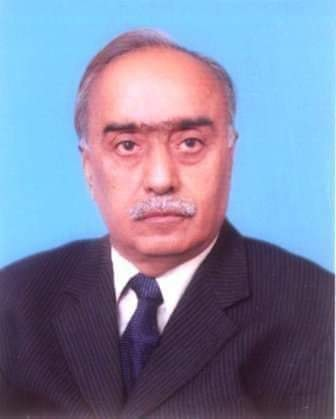
- Born: حيات علي شاھ بخاري; 12 April 1949; Hatri, Sindh, Pakistan
- Died: 2 November 2020 (aged 71); Hyderabad, Sindh, Pakistan
- Occupations: Broadcaster, dramatist, journalist
- Years active: 1967–2020
- Children: Syed Ghaus Ali Shah (son), four daughters: Afshan Bukhari, Fiza Bukhari, Iqra Bukhari and Arisha Bukhari

Syed Hayat Ali Shah Bukhari (Sindhi: سيد حيات علي شاھ بخاري; 12 April 1949 – 2 November 2020) was a Pakistani radio, TV and film artist, dramatist and film director. He wrote more than 200 serials and plays for radio and TV channels. He also worked as a journalist and columnist. He was associated with the Sindhi-language Daily Ibrat at the time of his death in 2020.

== Early life ==
Syed Hayat Ali Shah was born on 12 April 1949 in village Hatri near Hyderabad, Sindh, Pakistan. His father, Syed Ghaus Ali Shah, was a landlord. He received primary education in his hometown, Hatri. One of his teachers, Syed Saleh Muhammad Shah, was a famous radio and TV artist. Young Bukhari was highly inspired by his teacher and decided to pursue a career as an artist and broadcaster. He passed his matriculation examination from Noor Muhammad High School Hyderabad and intermediate from Sachal Arts College Hyderabad.

== Radio artist and writer ==
He joined Radio Pakistan Hyderabad in 1967 as a drama artist and writer. Bukhari proved himself as one of the best radio dramatists. He penned down more than 200 plays, serials and scripts for Radio Pakistan's stations in Hyderabad, Karachi, Khairpur and Larkana. He was a popular radio writer and artist from the 1970s to 2000s. He also served as a host at Radio Pakistan Hyderabad.

== Television ==
Famous TV producer Haroon Rind introduced him at Pakistan Television Centre Karachi. He wrote many memorable solo plays and serials for Pakistan Television. He also acted in famous TV plays and serials.

== Contributions in the film world ==
Film director A. Q. Pirzada introduced him in the film world as an actor, writer and director. His first Sindhi-language film was Mahboob Mitha, in which he worked as an assistant director. He was also assistant director of Sindhi films Rat Ji Rand, Jeejal Mau, Piyar Tan Sadeqay and Rat Ja Rishta. He was also writer of the films Jeejal Mau and Rat Ja Rishta. Famous singer and musician Inayat Hussain Bhatti invited him to Lahore as a director and writer of the films Deedar Sajjan and Ghareeban Jo Yaar. Unfortunately both of these films could not be released, perhaps due to lack of funds. He was part of the direction team of Doghla, which was a popular Punjabi film of the time. He also directed Sindhi film Poti Aien Pag.

== Journalist and Columnist ==
Bukhari began his career as a journalist in 1988. He wrote hundreds of columns on various topics for a number of newspapers, particularly Sindhi-language Daily Ibrat Hyderabad. His comic columns were very popular among readers. He served as a news editor of Daily Nijat. He then served in different capacities for various Sindhi-language dailies including Sindh News, Khadem-e-Wattan, Kawish and Ibrat. At the time of his death, he was serving as an assistant editor of Daily Ibrat Hyderabad.

== Death ==
Syed Hayat Ali Shah Bukhari died on 2 November 2020 in Hirabad, Hyderabad. He was buried at Hatri graveyard.
