= Culture of Sindh =

Culture in the Indus Valley

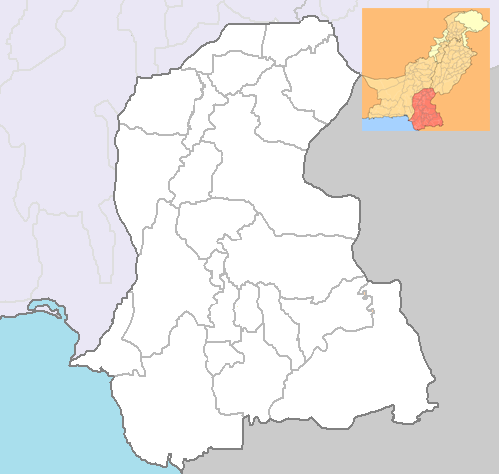
Sindh - Map

The Culture of Sindh (Sindhi: سنڌ جي ثقافت) has its roots in the Indus Valley Civilization. Sindh has been shaped by the largely desert region, the natural resources it has available, and continuous foreign influence. The Indus or Sindhu River, which passes through the land, and the Arabian Sea (Which defines its borders) also supported the seafaring traditions among the local people. The local climate also reflects why the Sindhis have a language, folklore, traditions, customs, and lifestyle that are so different from the neighbouring regions. The Sindhi culture is also practised by the Sindhi diaspora.

== History ==
The roots of Sindhi culture go back to the distant past. Archaeological research during the 19th and 20th centuries showed the roots of social life, religion, and culture of the people of the Sindh: their agricultural practises, traditional arts and crafts, customs and traditions, and other parts of social life, going back to a mature Indus Valley Civilization of the third millennium BC. Recent research has traced the Indus Valley civilization to even earlier ancestry.

=== Archaeological discoveries ===
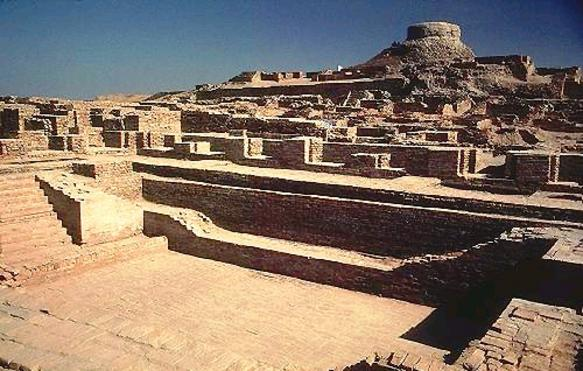
Mohen-Jo-Daro

The excavations of Mohen-Jo-Daro have unfolded the city life of a civilization of people with values, a distinct identity, and a distinct culture. Therefore, the first definition of the Sindhi culture emanates from that of the 7000-year-old Indus Valley Civilization. This is the pre-Aryan period, about 3,000 years BC, when the urban civilization in Sindh was at its peak.

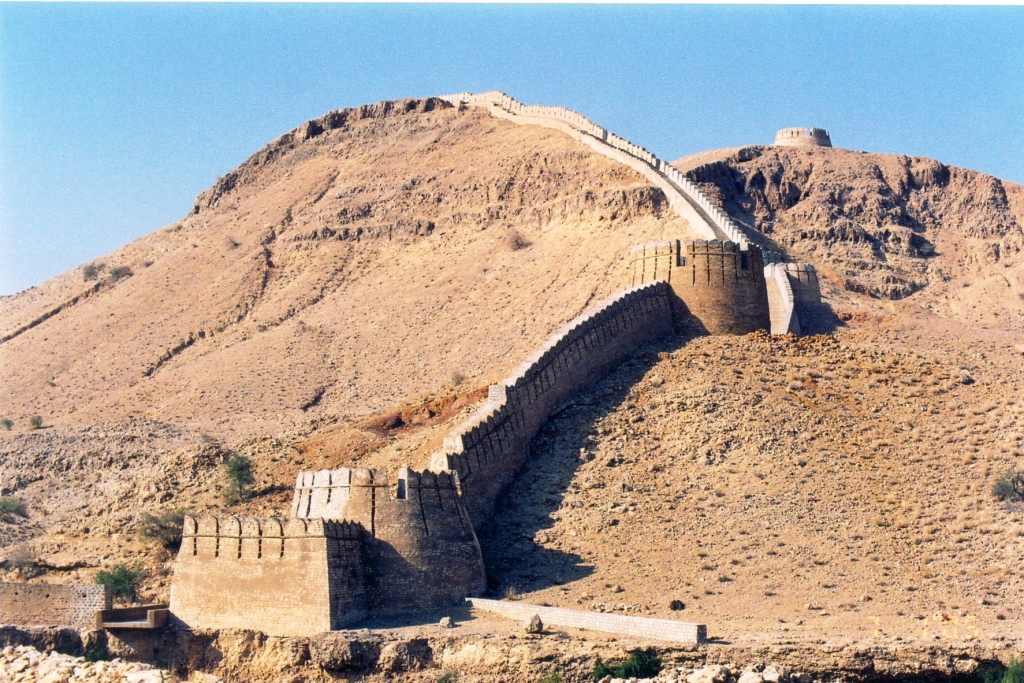
Ranikot Fort

In Sir Mortimer Wheeler's book, Civilization of the Indus Valley and Beyond, it is said that; "Civilization, in a minimum sense of the term, is the art of living in towns, with all that the condition implies in respect of social skills and disciplines." When people speak of Sindhi civilization, they have to concern themselves mainly with the material and concrete side of human habitation, of which Sindhi culture is the only essence called the superstructure. The present-day Sindh, along with the Northern part of the Indus Valley Civilization (around 3000 to 2500 BC), is located in its urban civilization.

Ranikot Fort is also a landmark of the Indus Valley Civilization. It is the world's largest fort, with walls extending to 20 km. It has been called "The great Wall of Sindh", and attracts many visitors.

== Literature ==
=== History ===
Sindhi language is ancient and rich in literature. Its writers have contributed extensively to various forms of literature in both poetry and prose. Sindhi literature is very rich and is one of the world's oldest literatures. The earliest reference to Sindhi literature is contained in the writings of Arab historians. It is established that Sindhi was the first eastern language into which the Quran was translated in the 8th or 9th century. There is evidence of Sindhi poets reciting their verses before the Muslim Caliphs in Baghdad. It is also recorded that treatises were written in Sindhi on astronomy, medicine, and history during the 8th and 9th centuries.

=== Poetry ===
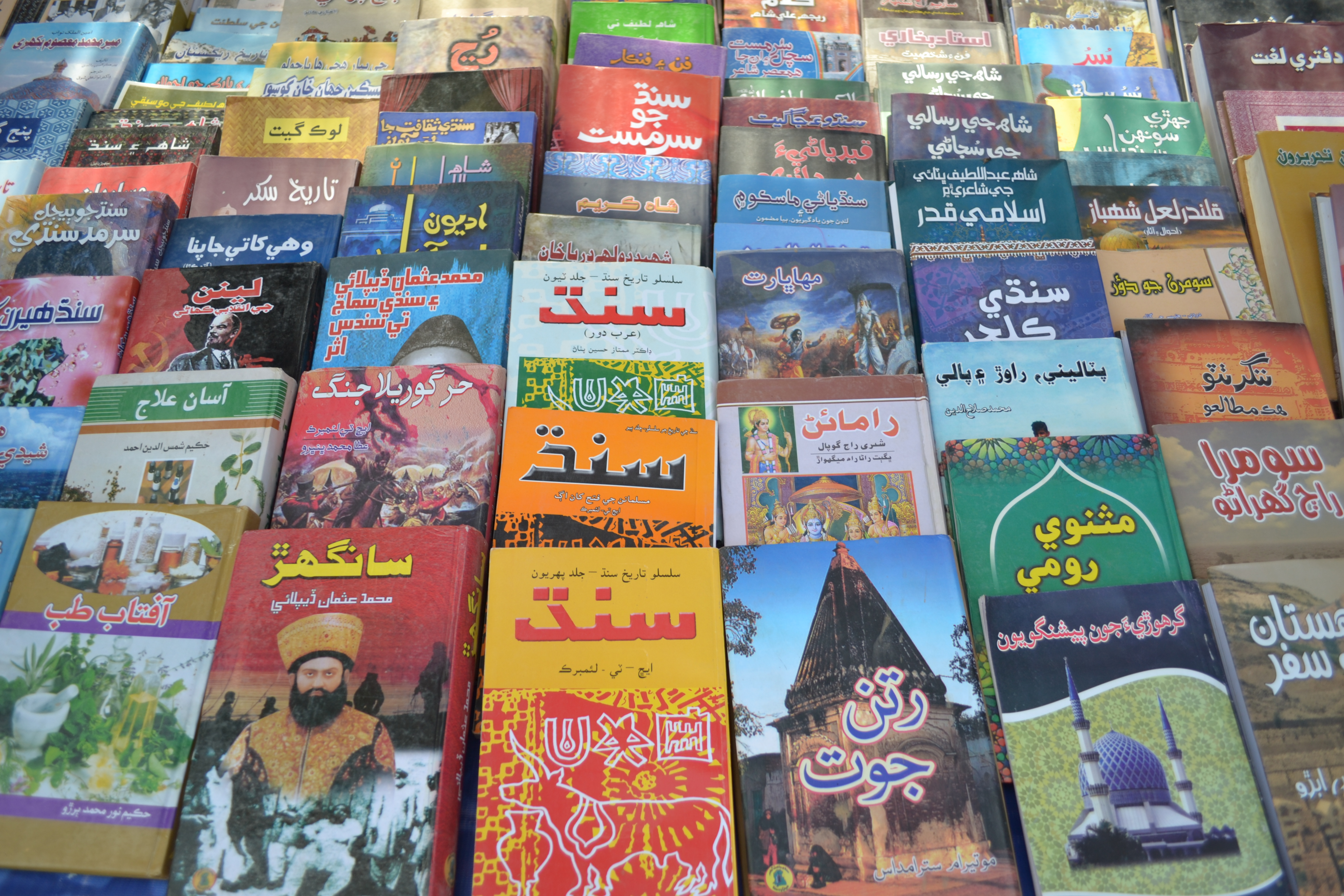
Sindhi Literature

Prominent in Sindhi culture, Sindhi poetry (Sindhi: سنڌي شاعري) continues an oral tradition dating back a thousand years. The verbal verses were based on folk tales. Sindhi is one of the major oldest languages of the Indus Valley, having a peculiar literary colour both in poetry and prose. Sindhi poetry is very rich in thought and contain a variety of genres, like other developed languages. Old Sindhi poetry impacts upon contemporary languages and also accepts the healthy influence of some languages like Hindi. Sindhi poetry contains two main original forms of verse, such as bait and Waei. Bait slightly resembles the forms of Dohas and Sorthas and is also influenced by Persian forms like Ghazal, Mathnavi, Rubai, and Kaafi. Since the 1940s, Sindhi poetry has incorporated broader influences, including the sonnet and blank verse. Soon after the independence of Pakistan in 1947, these forms were reinforced by Triolet, Haiku, Renga, and Tanka etc. At present, these forms continue to coexist, albeit to varying degrees, with Azad Nazm having an edge over them all. The poetry of Shah Abdul Latif Bhittai and Sachal Sarmast is very famous throughout Sindh.

== Music ==
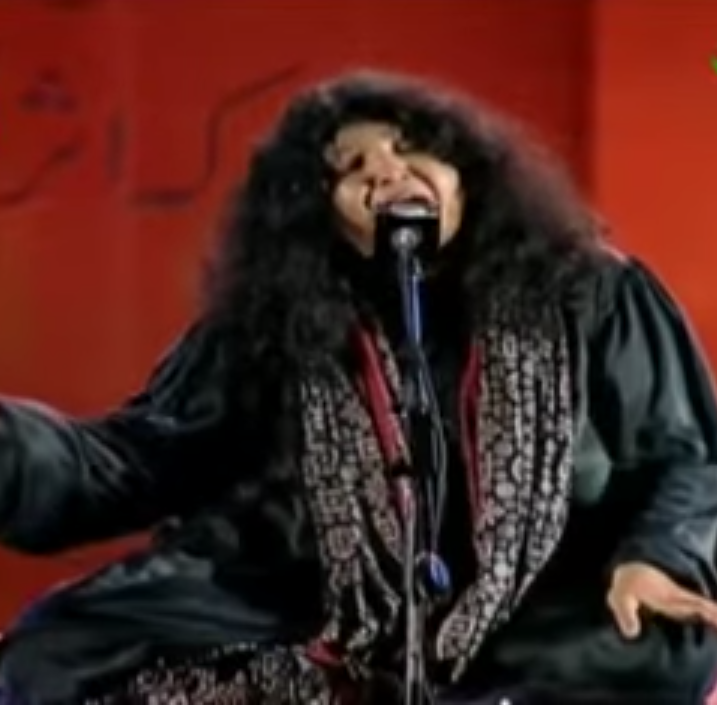
Abida Parveen has popularized Sindh and Pakistan in the world.

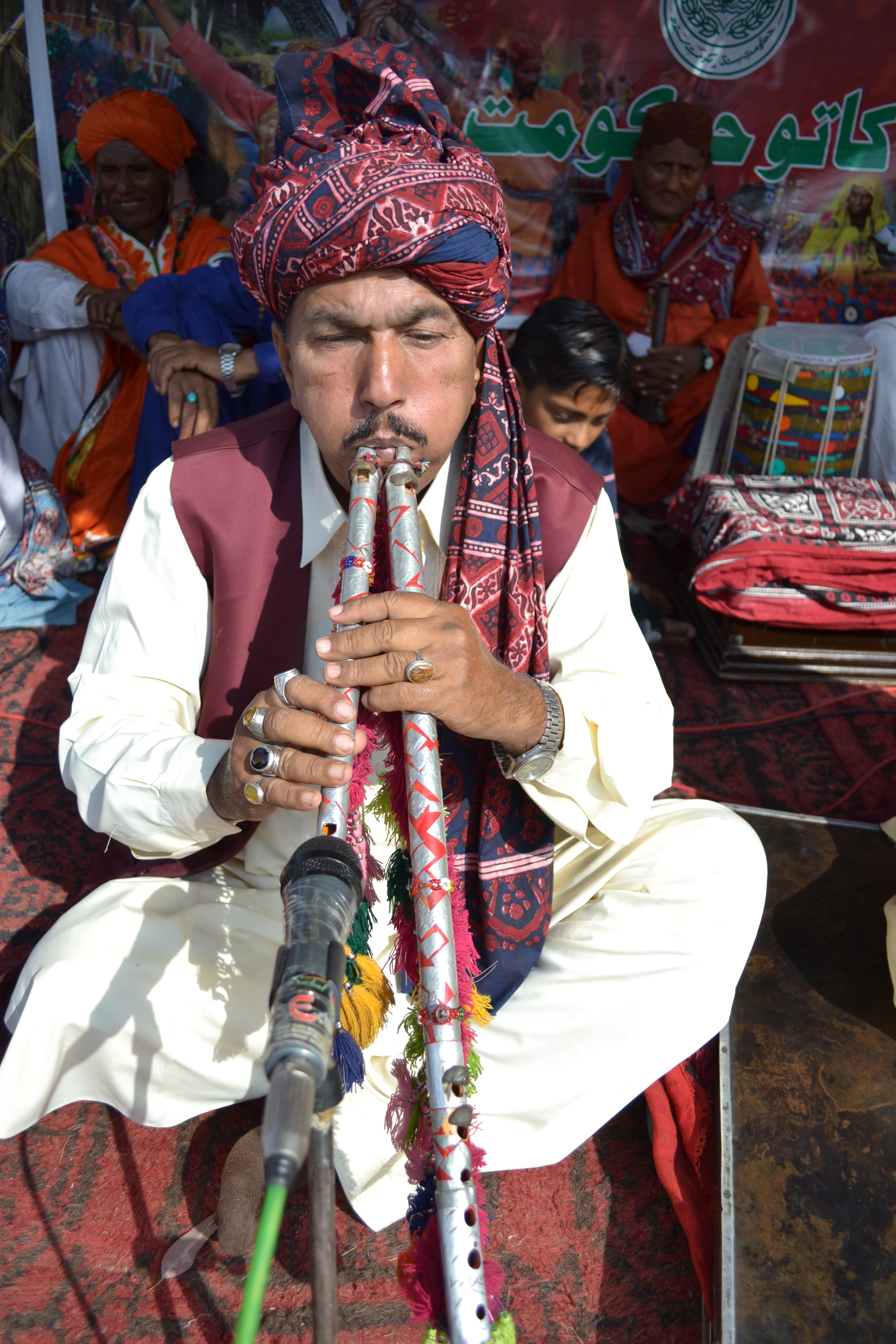

Sindhi music has its own unique quality. It is performed in many different ways. Sufi music is performed at shrines, and other simple music is performed at studios and gatherings.

== Sports ==
There are many regional sports that are played in Sindh. Malakhiro is one of the famous local sports of Sindh. Other sports include Wanjh, Kodi Kodi, Beelarhoo, Thipai Rand, Notinn, Biloor, Cricket, Volleyball and football are also popular among the locals of Sindh.

== Cultural character ==
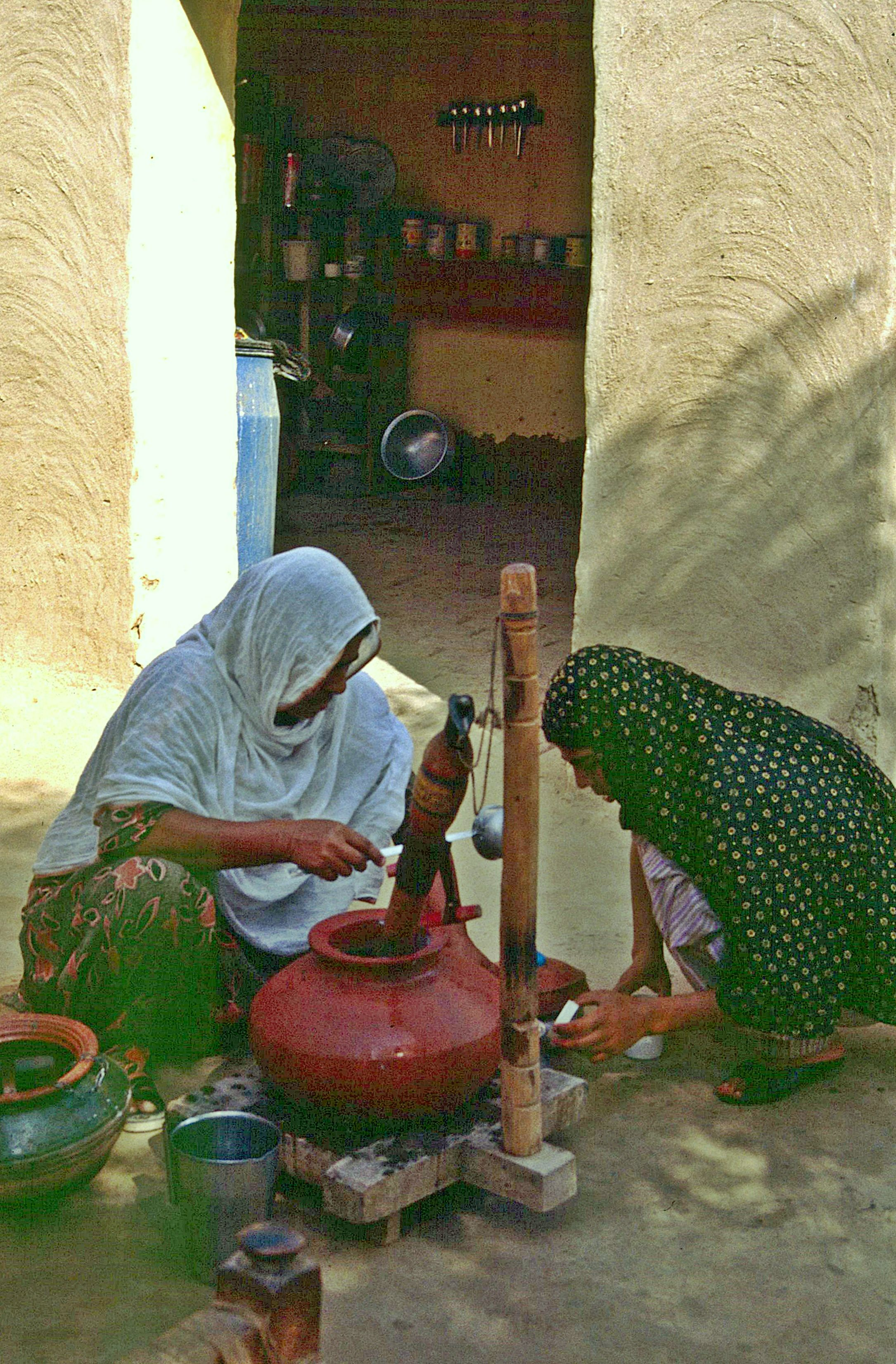
Women of Sindh churning the milk (Dosh Viloran)

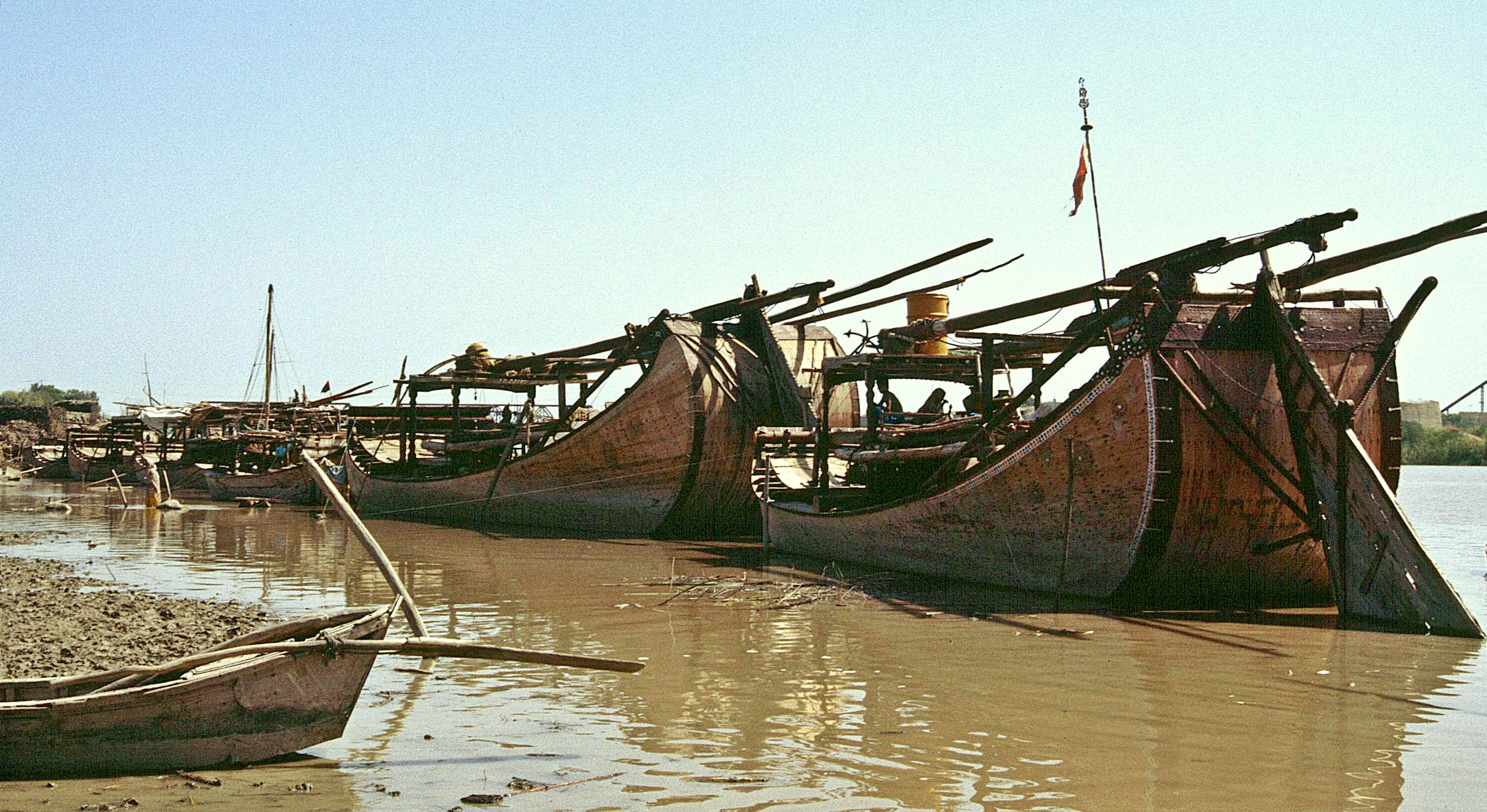
Sindhi boats in Sukkur

The ancient Sindhi civilization was a place where the aesthetic utilisation of leisure was freely indulged. There has been evidence that the excavations of sites dating back to 3000 BC (all over Sindh) are also true, around 1200 years ago when Jaina Dakshiniya Chihna (778 AD) described the distinguished features of Sindhis in this way: "Elegant, with a lovely, soft, and slow gait, they are fond of the art of Gandharvas (that is, songs, music, and dancing) and full affection towards their country." Nasir Kalwar

== Sindhi Cultural Day (Ekta Day) ==
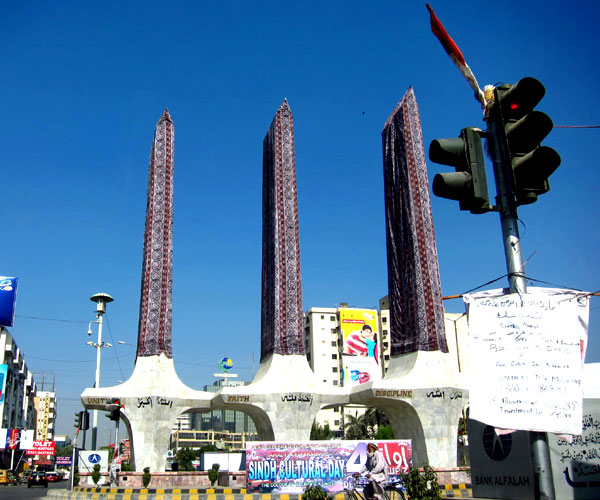
Karachi:Teen Talwar wrapped in Ajrak in connection with Sindhi Cultural day

Sindhis celebrate Sindh Cultural Day worldwide every year on the first Sunday of December. The 1st Sunday of December was Advised and fixed by Dr. Sarang Ansari, a Sindhi poet also known as Sarang Bhittai. Dr. Sarang Bhittai lives in New York, USA. By wearing Ajrak and Sindhi Topi. On that occasion, musical programmes and rallies are held in many cities to mark the day with zeal. Major hallmarks of cities and towns are decorated with Sindhi Ajrak to highlight the cultural values of Sindh. The people across Sindh exchange gifts of Ajrak and Topi at various ceremonies. Even the children and women are dressed up in Ajrak, assembling at the grand gathering, where famous Sindhi singers sing Sindhi songs, which depict the love and progress of Sindh. The musical performances of the artists compel the participants to dance to Sindhi tunes and ‘Jeay Sindh Jeay-Sindh Wara Jean’.
All Political, social, and religious organisations of Sindh, besides the Sindh culture department and administrations of various schools, colleges, and universities, organize a variety of events, including seminars, debates, folk music programmes, drama, and theatrical performances, tableaus, and literary sittings to mark this annual festivity. Sindhi culture, history and heritage are highlighted at the events.

Ekta (Unity) Day is observed to display solidarity among the Sindhi-speaking masses; the event is celebrated not only in Karachi but throughout Sindh. The province’s culture and unity day was celebrated for the first time on December 6, 2009 (as Sindhi Topi Day) as a backlash to the comments of anchorman Dr. Shahid Masood, who had criticised President Asif Ali Zardari for wearing a Sindhi cap on his foreign tours. People across the Sindh province condemned Masood’s comments via SMS, which ultimately resulted in the announcement of celebrating Sindhi Topi Day. Moreover, a prominent figure in Sindh, Ali Kazi, had started issuing a call for observing a unity day, and a large number of people responded to the call and started celebrating the culture and the unity days. Ever since, Sindhi media groups have started to celebrate the day as ‘Sindhi Cultural Day’ or 'Ekta Day'. The Sindhi language TV channels, including KTN, Sindh TV, Awaz TV, and Mehran TV broadcast, special programmes on the culture of Sindh; besides these media outlets separately arrange the mega musical events, which also attract large audience to celebrate Culture Day every year. The Sindhi language TV channels and Political Parties of Sindh, first time celebrated Sindhi Cultural Day (Ekta Day) together for the first time on December 8, 2013.

== Gallery ==
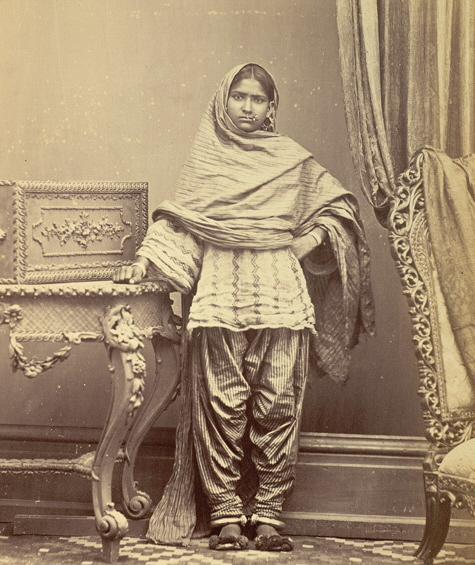
Portrait of a Sindhi Hindu girl from Sindh

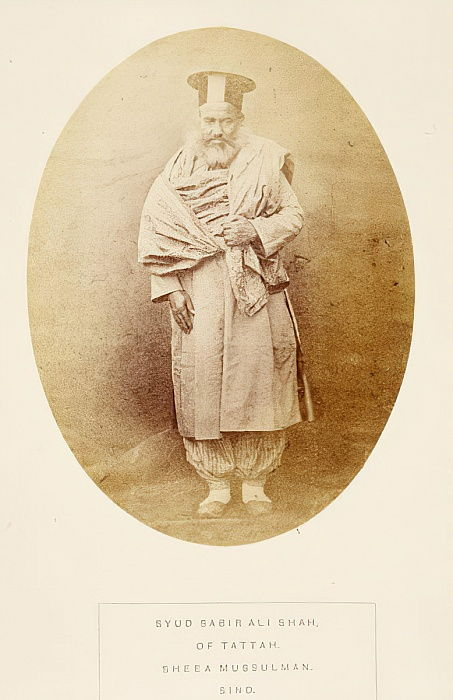
Sayyid Sabir Ali Shah, a Shia Muslim of Thatta

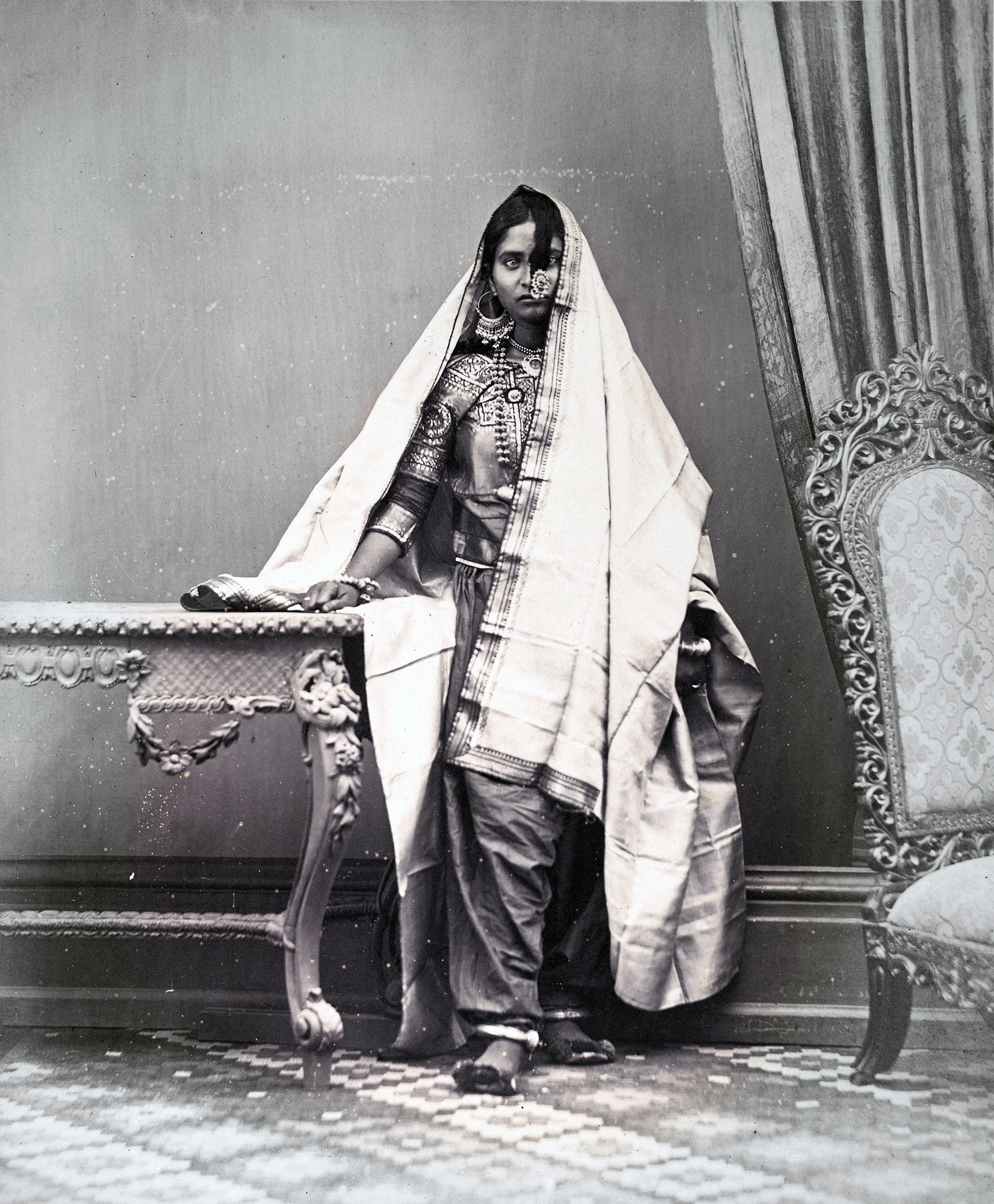
Portrait of a Sindhi Muslim girl from Sindh

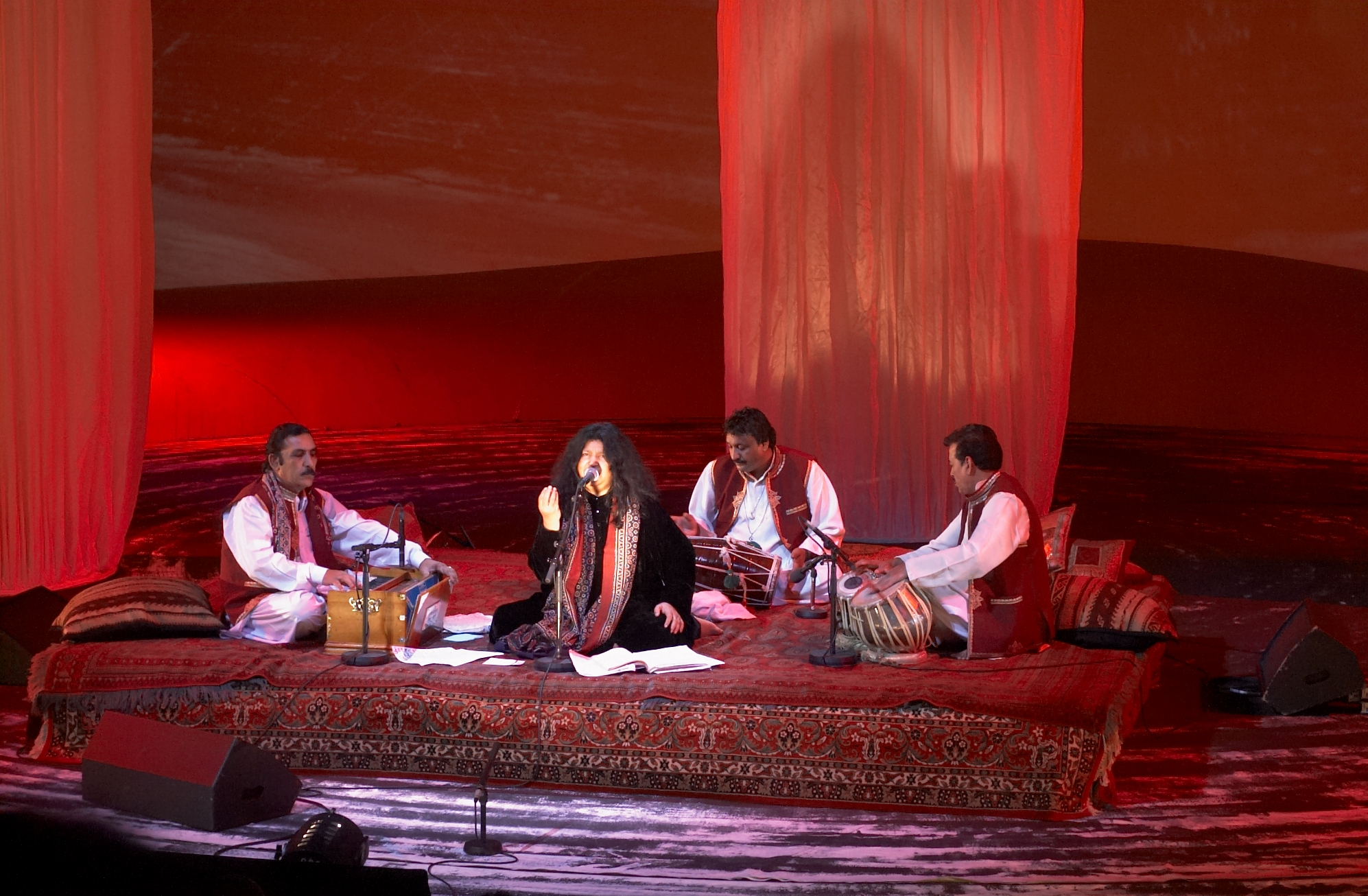
The great Sindhi Sufi singer, Abida Parveen visited Oslo in September 2007

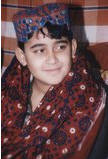
Zulfikar Ali Bhutto Junior in traditional Sindhi dress

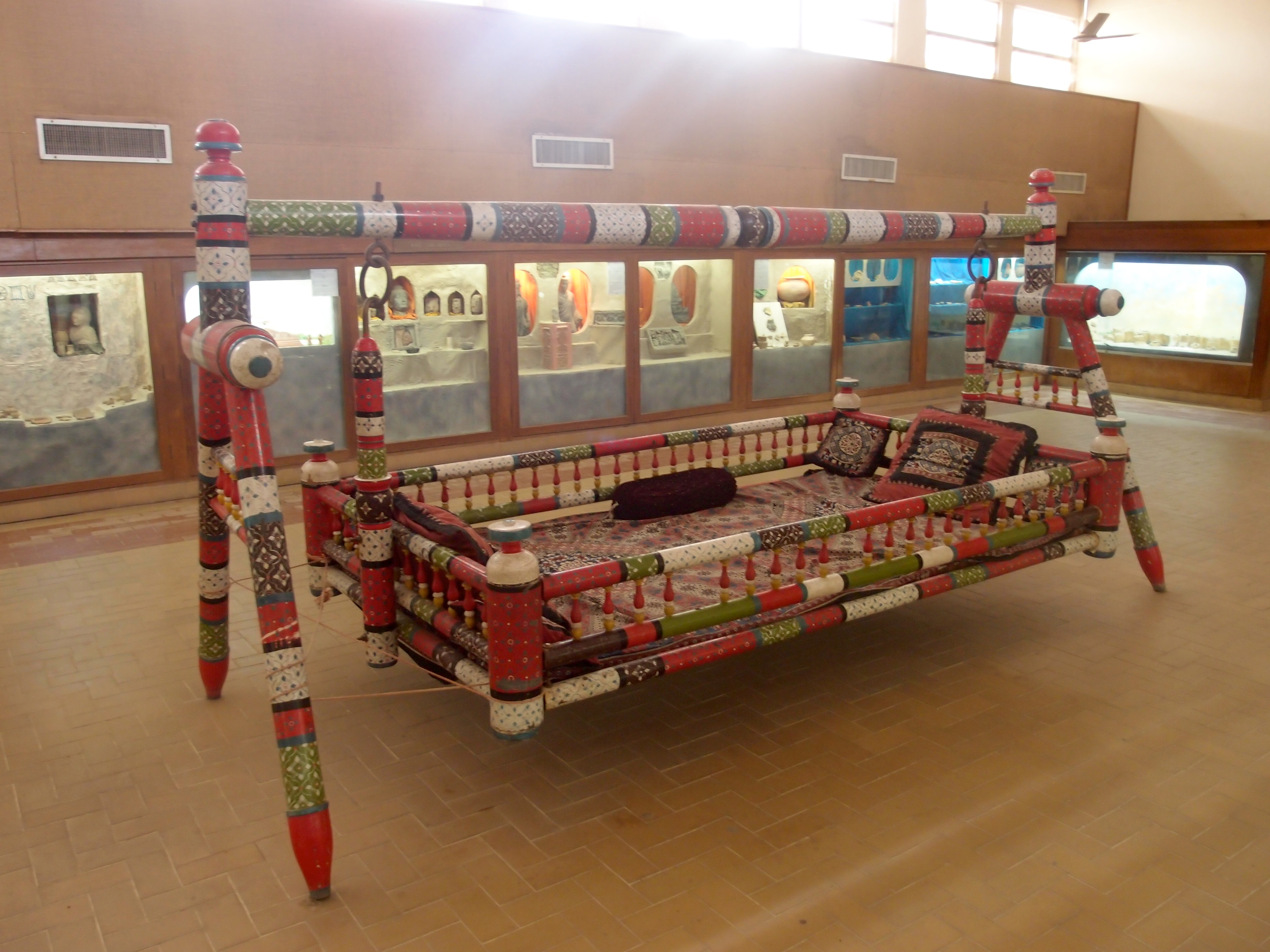
Sindhi traditional Swing (Hindoro/Pingho)

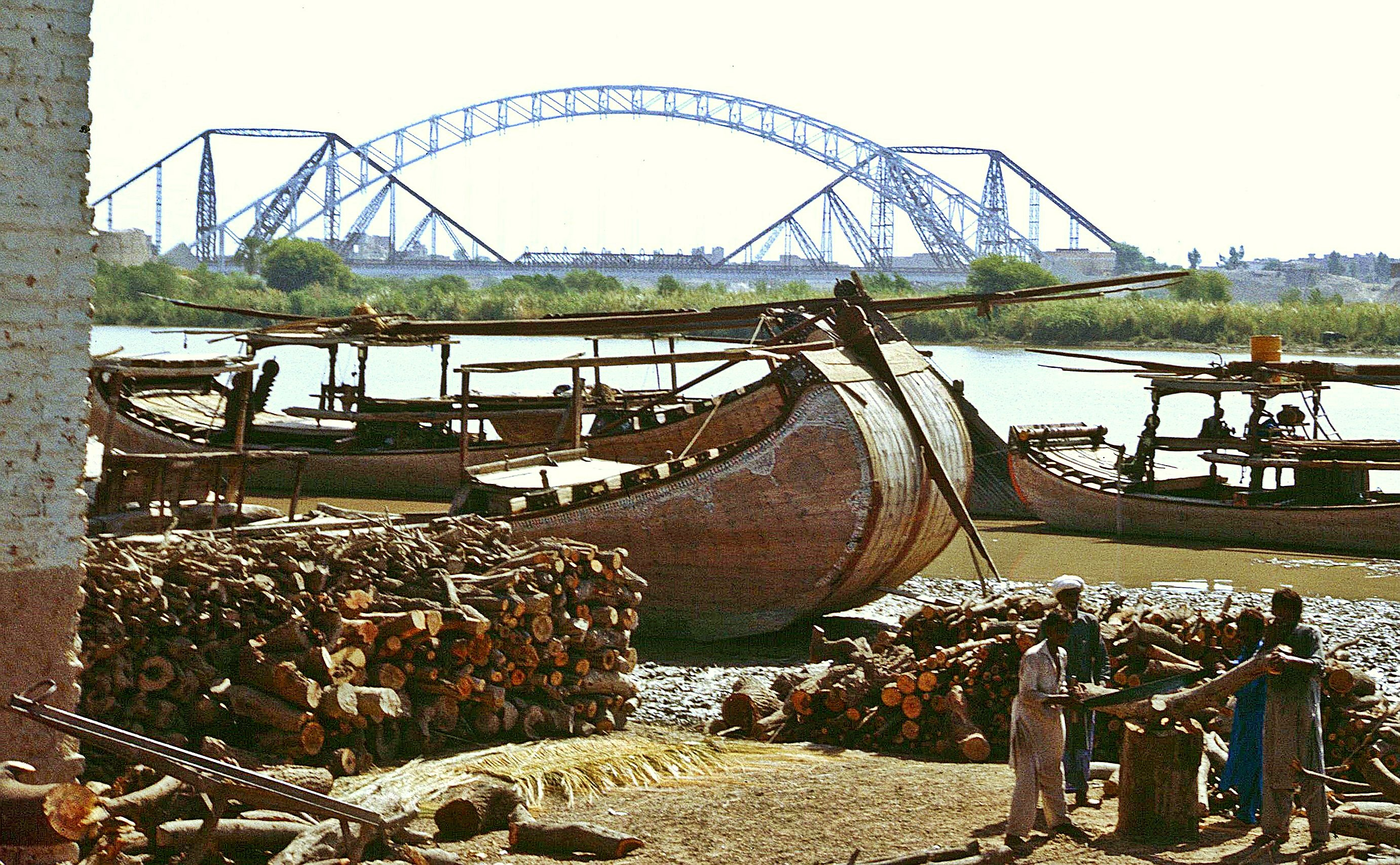
Sindhi handmade boats.

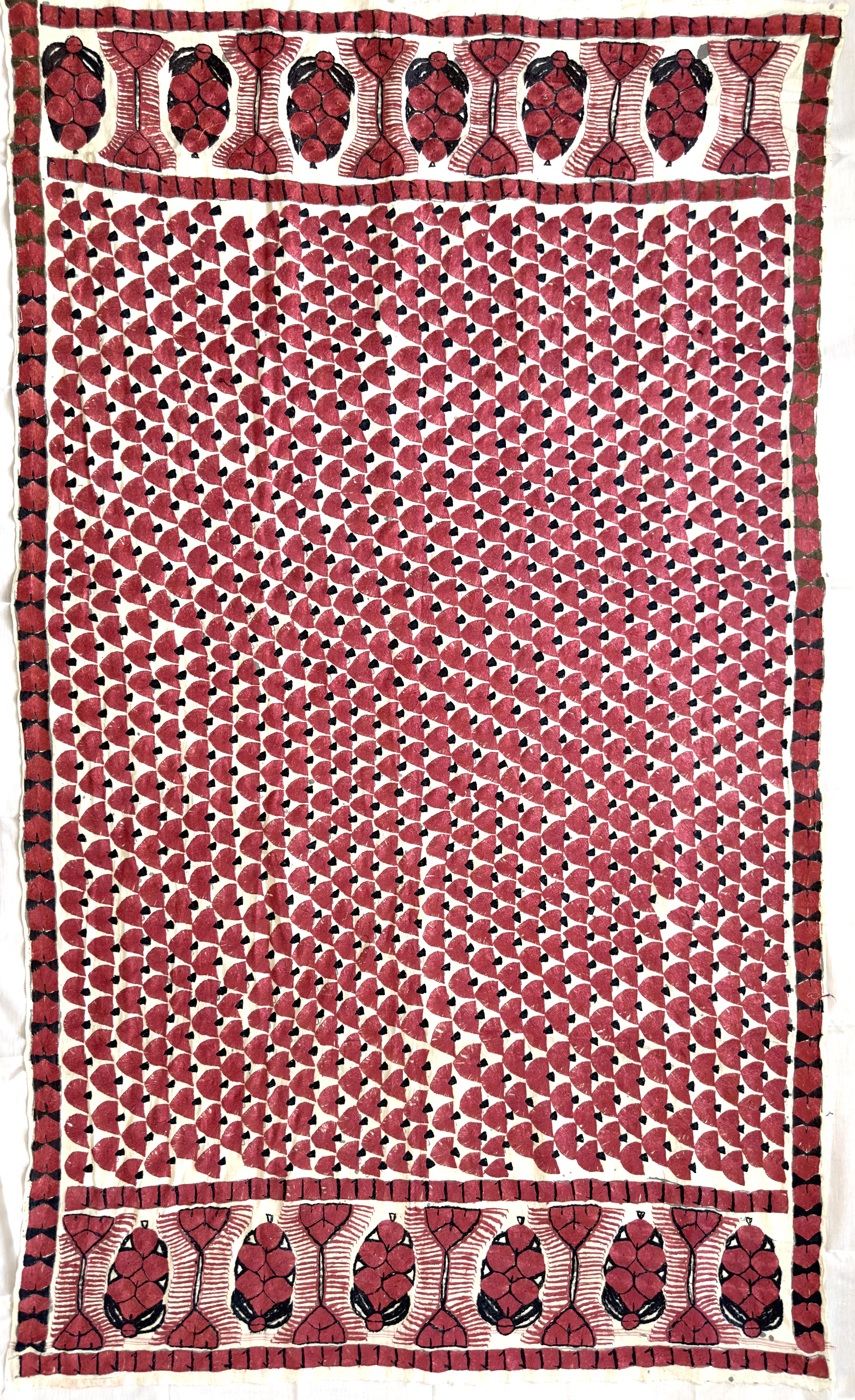
Traditional Sindhi Abochhini Shawl

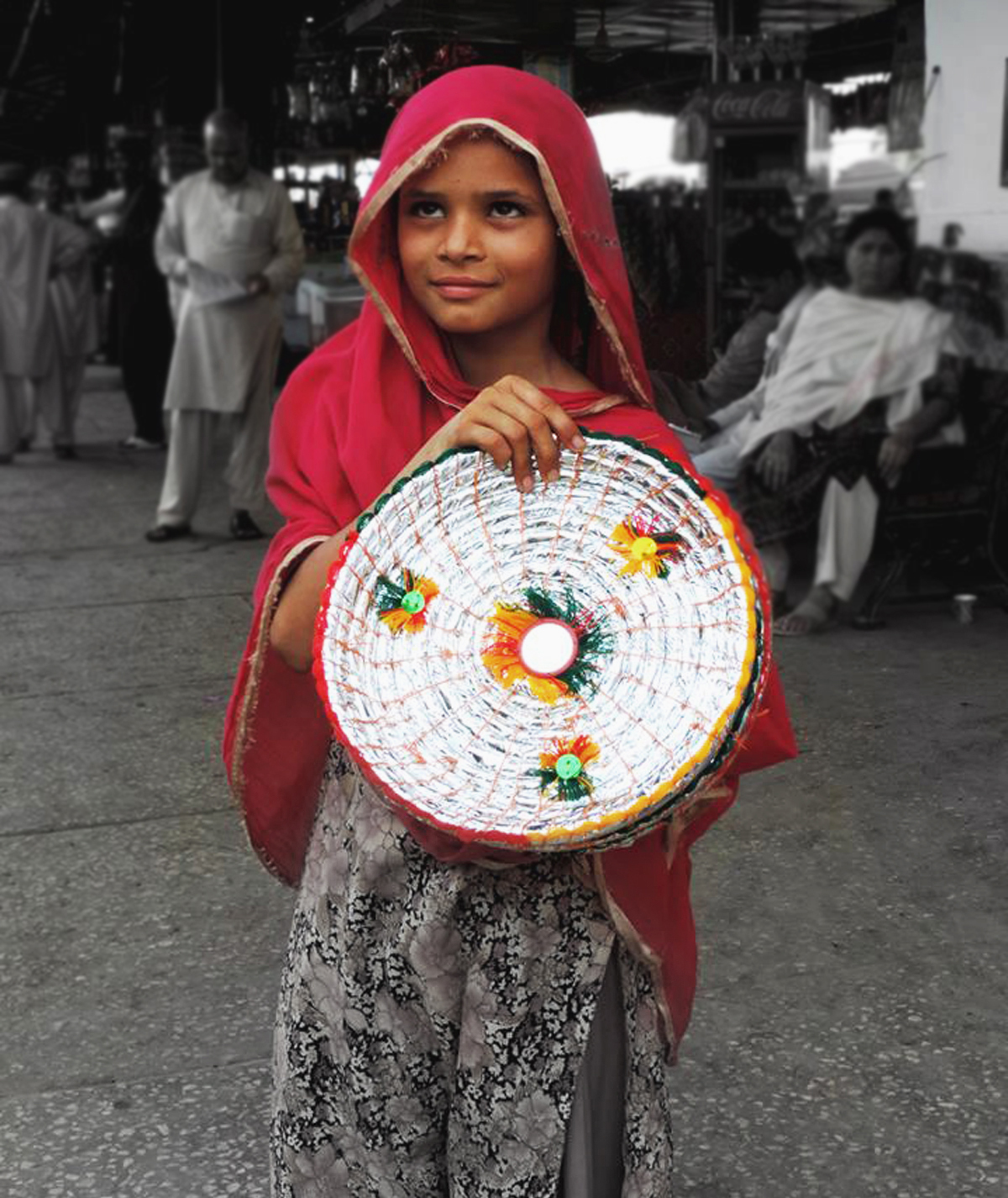
A girl selling traditional Sindhi Pindi/Dabeki

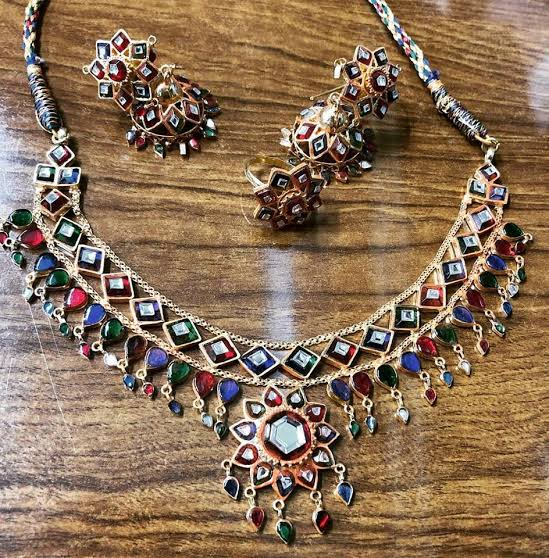
Traditional Sindhi Kundan necklace and earrings

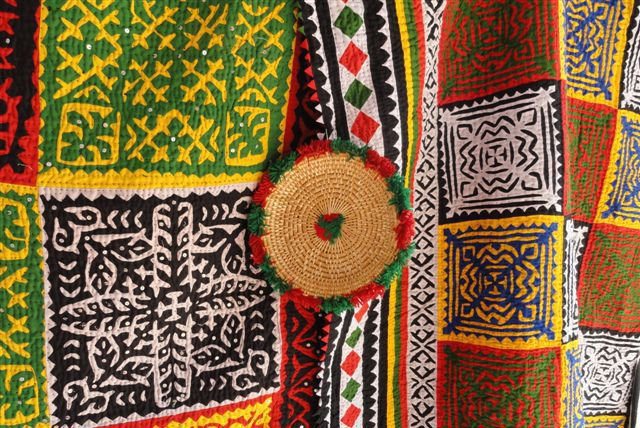
Sindhi Rilli quilts and Pindi/Dabeki

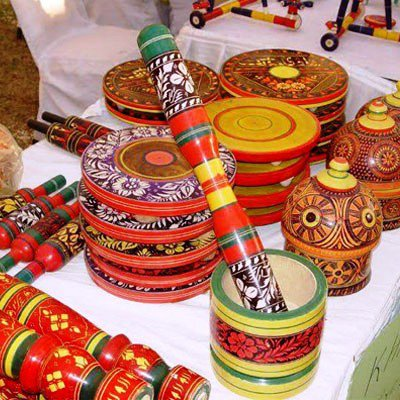
Sindhi wooden utensils with lacquer (Jandri/Jandi) work

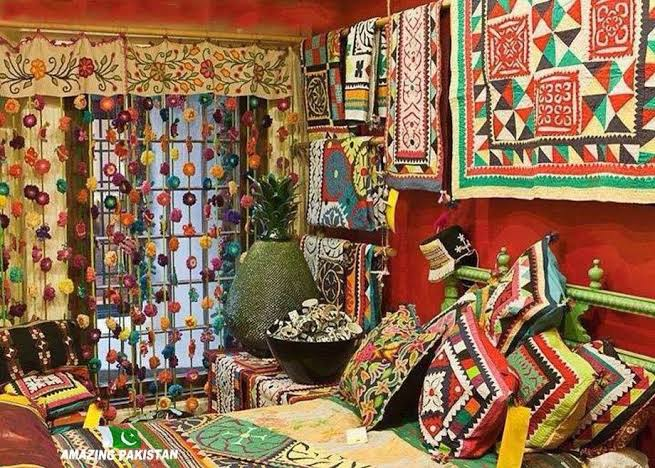
Traditionally decorated Sindhi house

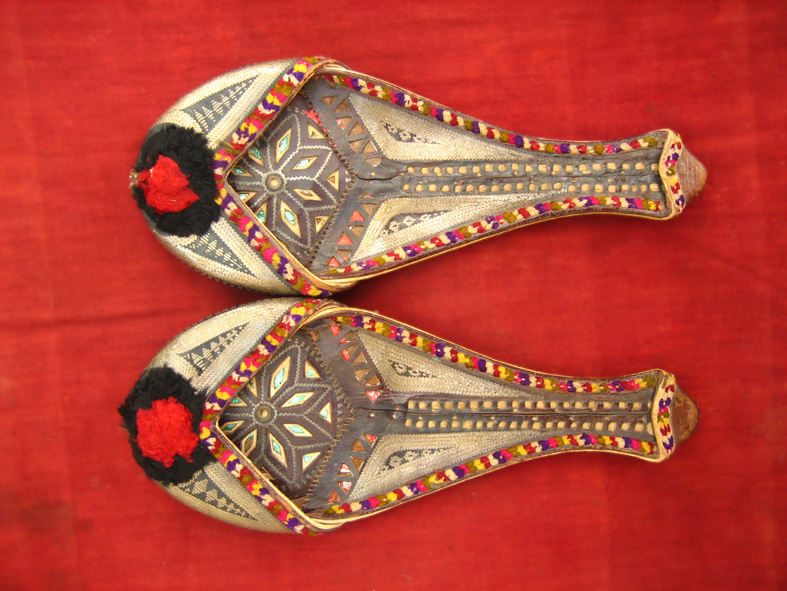
Sindhi women shoes

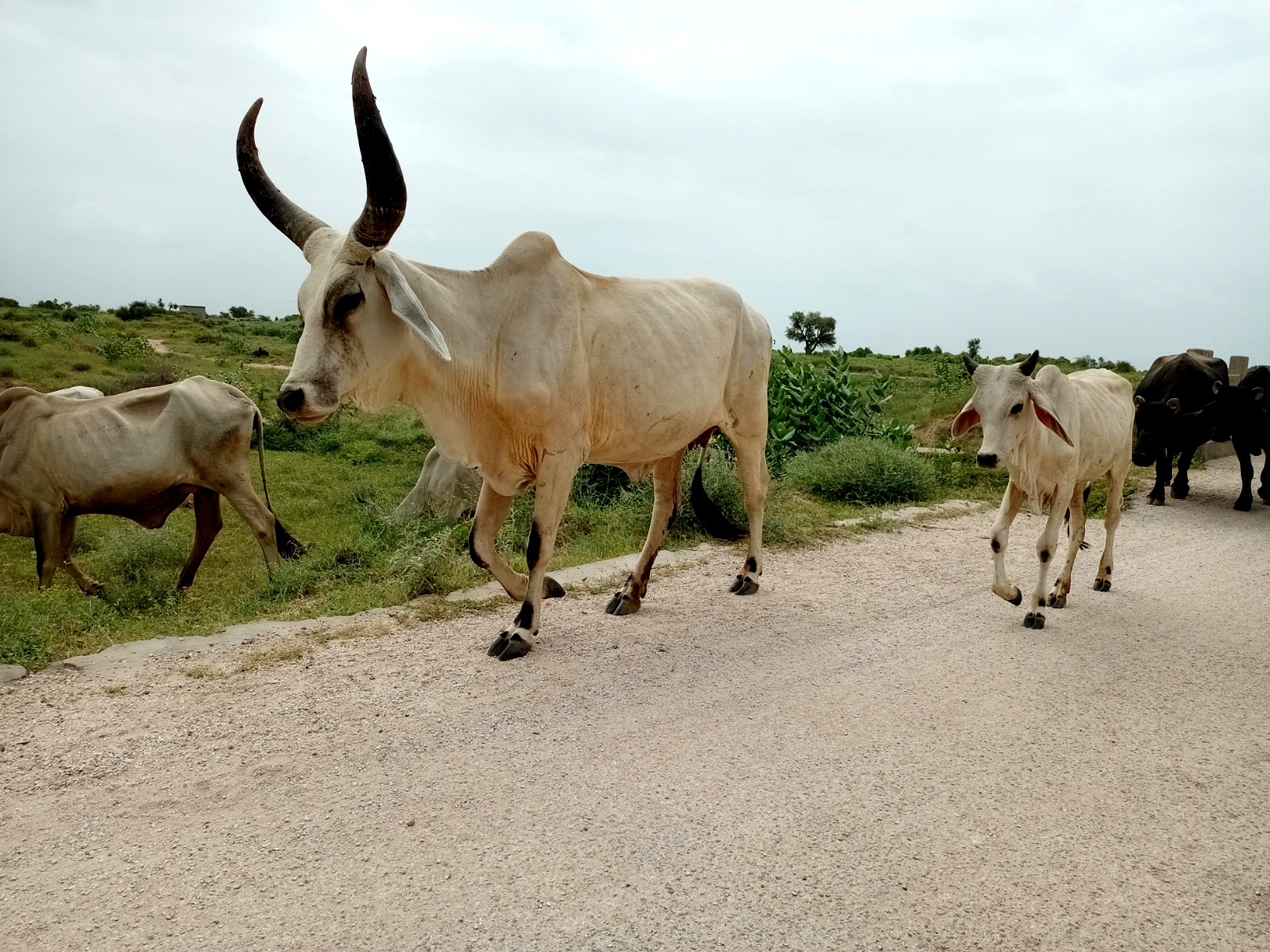
Sindhi cows

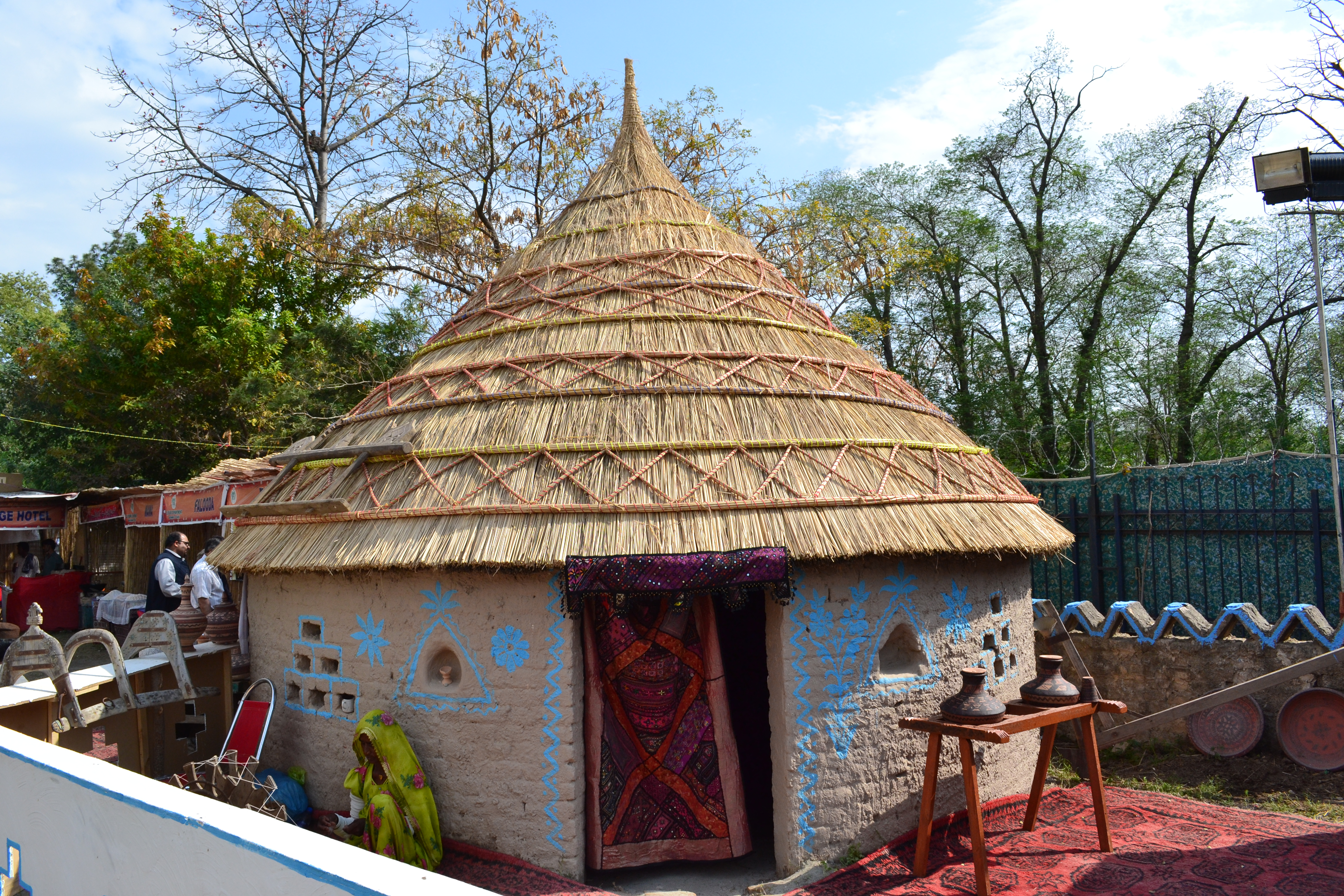
Sindhi desert home (Chonro)

== See also ==
- Sindh
- Sindhi people
- Tomb paintings of Sindh
- Sindhi dress
- Sindhi cuisine
- Sindhi traditions and rituals
- The Crafts of Sindh
- Sindhi Embroidery
- Folk dances of Sindh
- Sindhi music
- Sindhi Cultural Day
