= Ajrak =

Form of blockprinting in Sindh and south Punjab

Ajrak (Sindhi: اجرڪ; Saraiki: اجرک) is a unique form of textile block-printing found primarily among the Sindhi diaspora and in the Sindh region of Pakistan, and in the Gujarat and Rajasthan states of India, there is also a village of Ajrakhpur in the Kutch district. In South Punjab the Saraiki ajrak variation can be found.

Ajrak textiles like shawls or dresses display special designs and patterns made using block printing with stamps. Ajrak is a symbol of Sindhi culture and traditions. Ajrak prints are famous in the neighboring area of Hyderabad, Sindh.

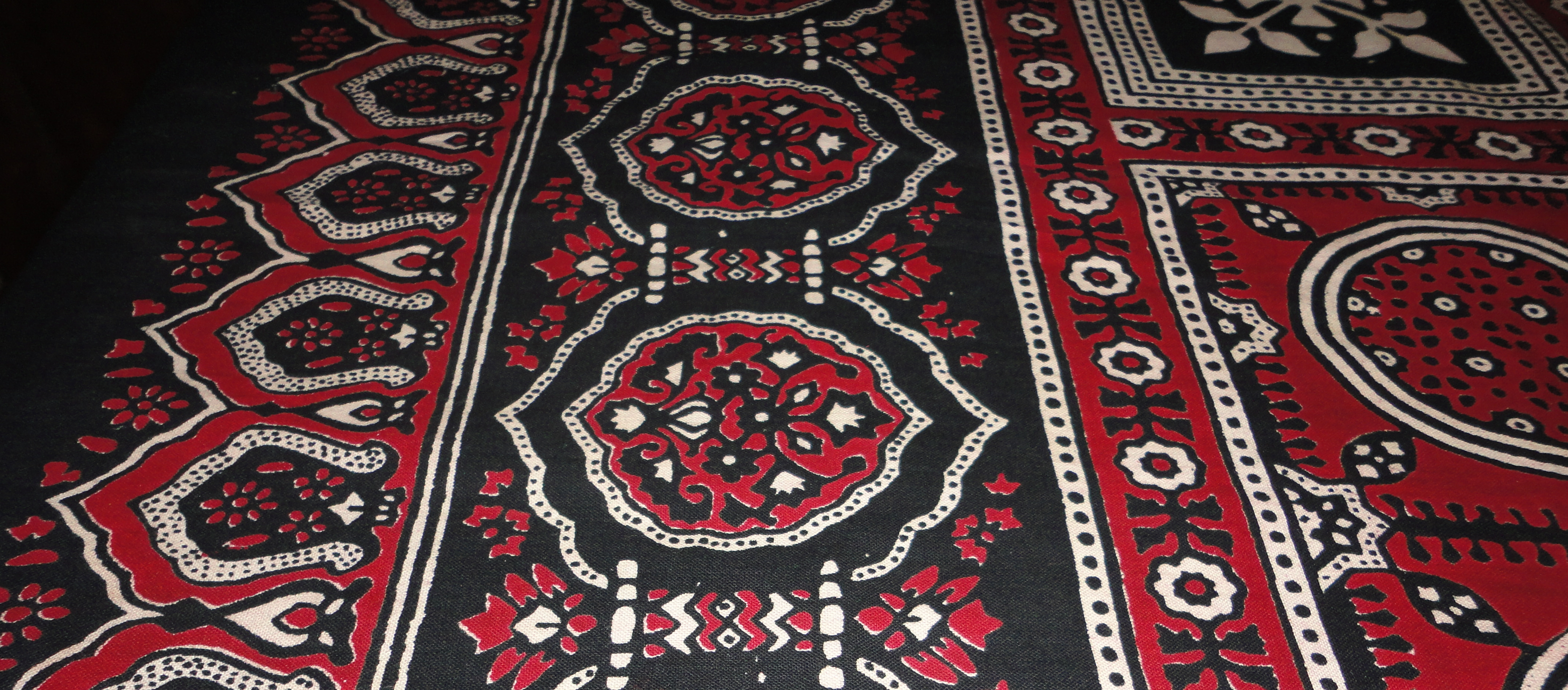
Sindhi ajrak

== Etymology ==
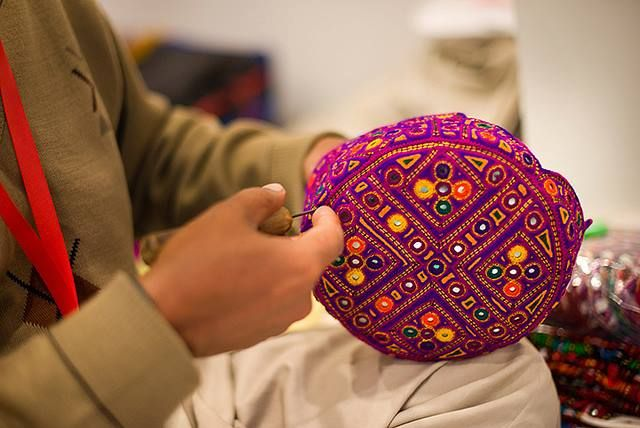
Traditional Sindhi cap.

The word Ajrak (Sindhi: اجرڪ) derives from the Persian word ajar (Persian: اجر), meaning "brick," combined with the diminutive suffix -ak (Persian: ک), meaning "small," conveying a sense of unity and reflecting the craft's cultural journey and exchange with other traditions.

== History ==
Early settlements in the lower Indus Valley cultivated and used Gossypium arboreum (tree cotton) to make cloth. These communities developed early textile skills that later fed into Sindhi block-print traditions such as ajrak.

A steatite bust known as the "Priest-King", excavated at Mohenjo-daro and currently in the National Museum of Pakistan, shows one shoulder draped in a piece of cloth that resembles an ajrak. Of special note is the trefoil pattern etched on the person's garment interspersed with small circles, the interiors of which were filled with a red pigment

Ajrak is a distinctive Sindhi block-printed cloth. The cloth is printed using carved wooden blocks and resist-dye techniques passed down through generations. Typical ajrak colour schemes centre on deep indigo and crimson with white and black used to define geometric motifs. Ajrak is usually sold as long unstitched cloth for draping as shawls, dupattas or wraps varying in length and size.

Ajrak production is concentrated in many parts of Sindh, including Matiari, Hala, Bhit Shah, Moro, Sukkur, Kandiaro, Hyderabad, and many cities of Upper Sindh and Lower Sindh. The cloth is widely used in Sindhi public and cultural life and is presented as a gesture of hospitality and respect.

Ajrak is commonly presented to guests and used at weddings and cultural events as a symbol of respect. The cloth is also a visible marker of Sindhi identity and appears in exhibitions and media about Sindhi textiles. In 2025, the Government of Sindh introduced new vehicle registration plates featuring an ajrak-inspired design to highlight Sindh's cultural heritage and promote regional identity.

== Making of the Ajrak ==
=== Jaal ===
The Sindhi Ajrak has rich central patterns natively called "Jaal". They are Mohar, Ghaleecho, Ambri Mohar, Kakar, Wal, Ishq Pech, Badam Ishq Pech, Chaanp, Badam, Jaleyb, Chakki, Challo, Taweez Challo, Moti Juran, Hasho Taweez, Hasho Jo Asl, Hasho Selemee, Hasho Jo Bazar, Kharak & Riyal.

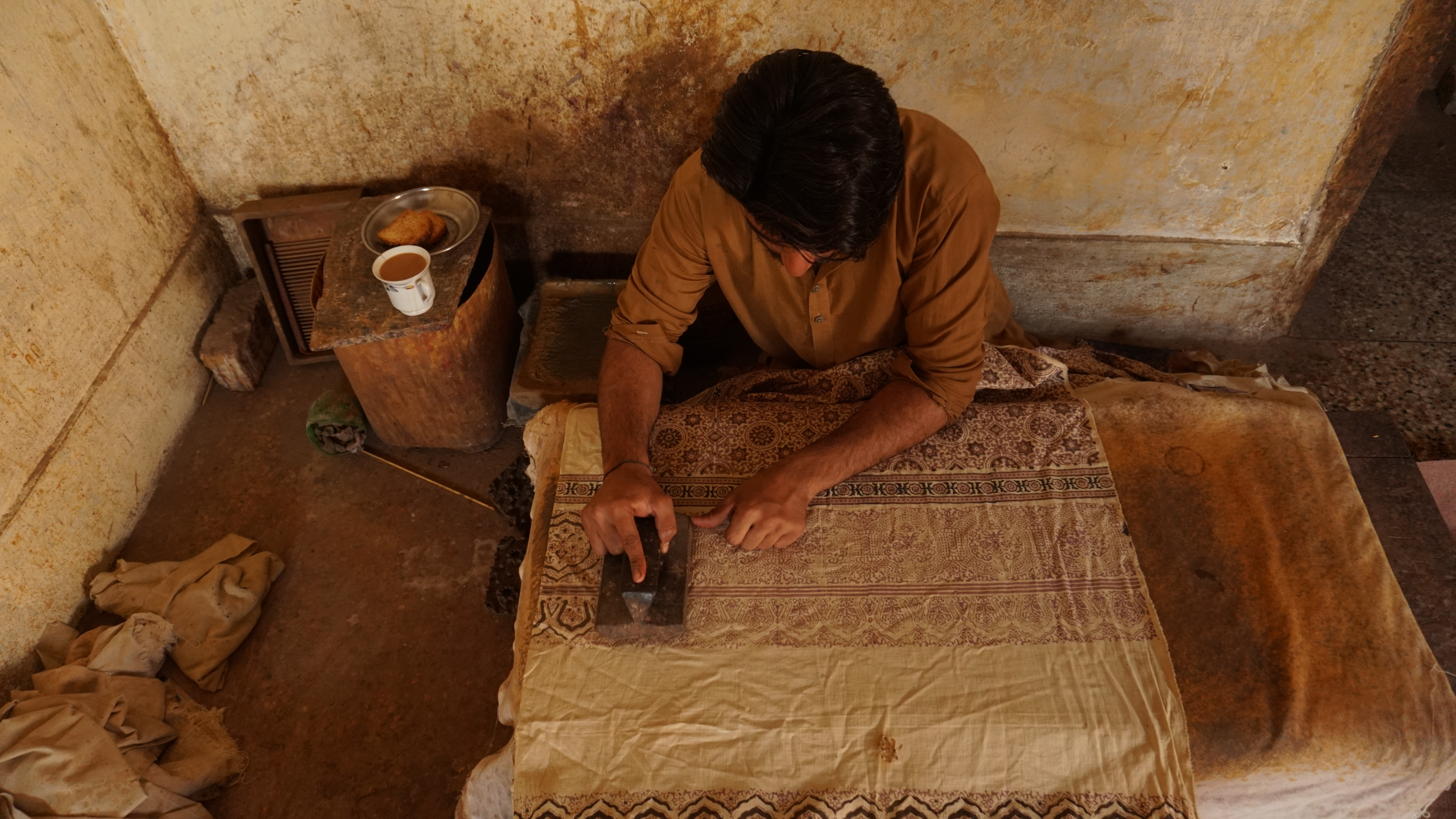
Ajrak in making

=== Dyes ===
Ajrak craft products are made with natural dyes. The entire production of the products includes both vegetable dyes and mineral dyes. Indigo is a key dye.

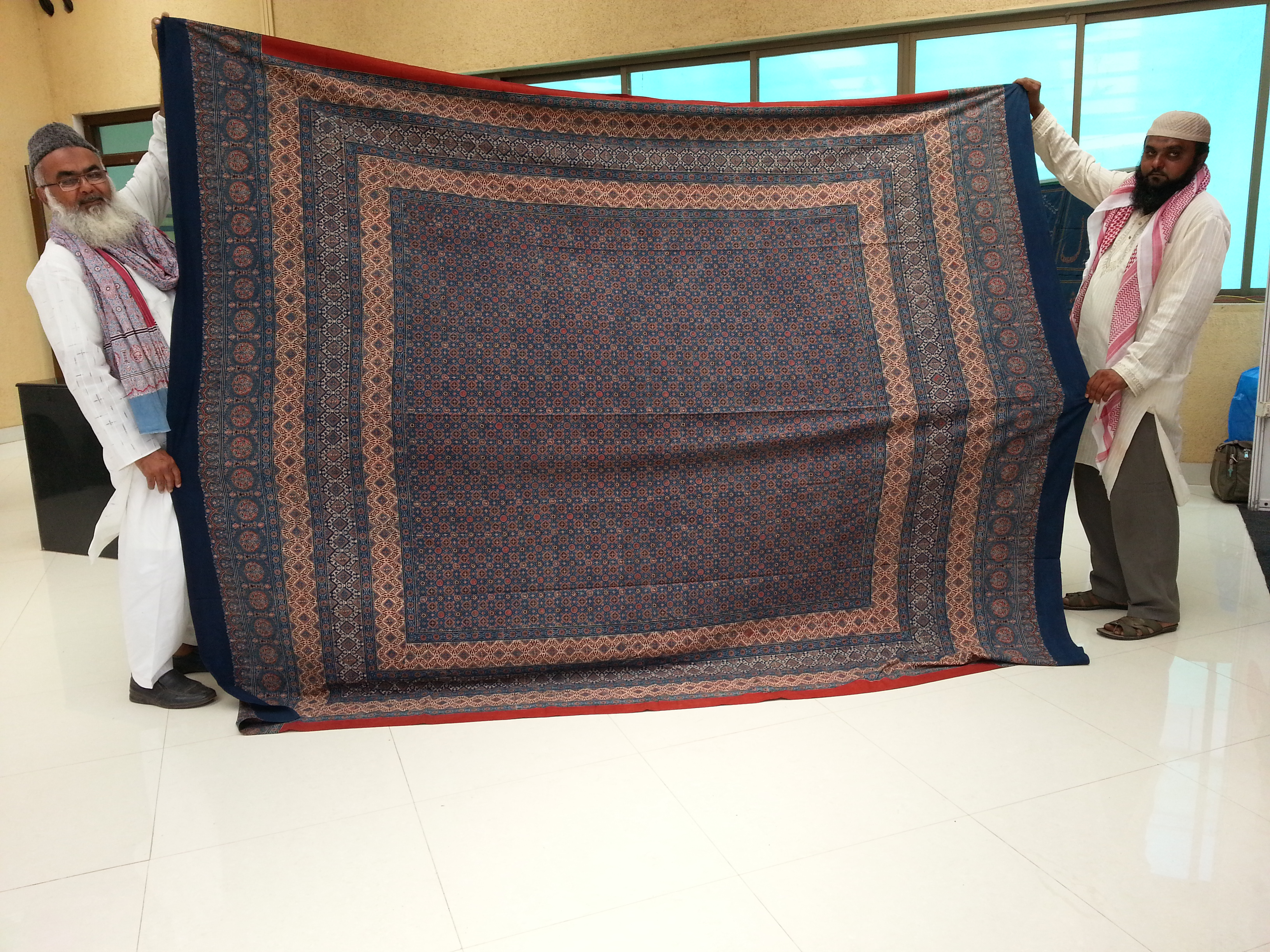
Ajrak double bed-sheet

=== Ajrak blocks ===
The most commonly observed pattern in Ajrak blocks and hence the fabric is dots between two lines, these dots are of the same radius in almost all the designs. These dots were initially carved out by hands, however later on brass nails were used to fill spaces between the two walls. This aspect is crucial in determining the expertise of the artisan.

The Mughal era has a deep influence on these designs. The Muslims followed a sense of strong geometry in their patterns and most patterns were formed by the interaction of two or more circles. The Ajrakh blocks were designed taking inspiration from the Muslim architectural elements that form the 'Mizan' - balance and order. The grid system determined the repeat patterns. Abstract symmetric representations of surrounding elements and environment were used.

== Honour ==
Sindhi Ajrak, along with Sindhi topi, is bestowed upon the guests as an honour. This serves two purposes. First, it makes the guest feel comfortable with the host. Secondly, it allows the guest to appreciate the Sindhi Culture.

== Modern day use ==
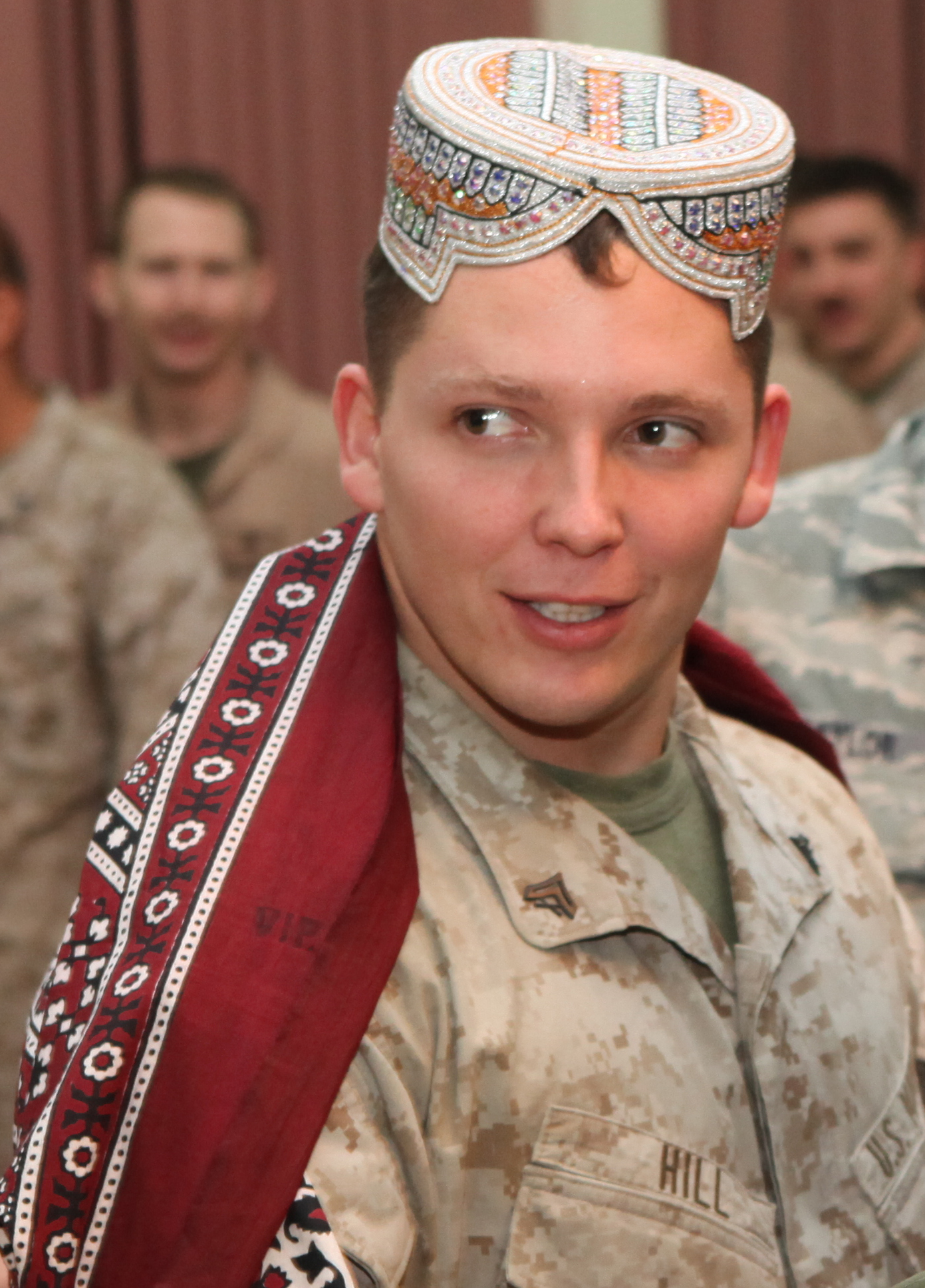
American soldier wearing Ajrak

Ajrak has now become increasingly popular amongst block print enthusiasts. Post the earthquake, there has been an increase in the demand for Ajrak, leading to increased use outside of the traditional sense. This has led to an increase in interest from various brands being focused on changes in the block print. Newer colours have been developed, along with new blocks and techniques

Ajrak has predominantly been a craft using natural dyes, making it inherently expensive. However, with the increase in demand for fast fashion products and cheaper items, chemical dyes have been utilised in Ajrak products.

== See also ==
- Saraiki ajrak
- Bagh Print
- Sindhi Cultural Day
- Sindhi cap
- Sindhi clothing
- Bagru Print
- Sindhi Lungee
