= List of Sindhi-language television channels =

This is a list of television channels available in Sindhi language. All of these are based in Pakistan, but many are available in other countries as well.

== History ==
Time News HD offers high definition, Sindhi content to the world. Television in Pakistan expanded after 2002. Private television channels were allowed during the rule of Pervez Musharraf in 2000. Sindhi media tends to cover topics which may not be covered by Urdu or English media. Pakistan has government owned as well as private media (including print and electronic), which is free and covers happenings in the nation and the rest of the world.

== Current channels ==
=== News ===
- Awaz Tv news
- Time News (HD)
- Awami Awaz TV
- KTN News
- Mehran TV
- Sindh TV News
- SKTV news in 5 languages sindhi Kachchhi Guajarati Hindi and English

=== Entertainment ===
- Dharti TV
- Awaz TV HD
- Sindh TV
- SKTV full entertainment channel on satellite and cable

=== Music ===
- Kashish TV
- SK TV

== Former channels ==
=== News ===
- BOL News Sindhi

=== Entertainment ===
- PTV Sindh
- TandoAdam TV
- Sindhi Kachchhi TV

=== Music ===
- Sachal Music
- Radio sindhi
- sktv music

== See also ==
- List of Pakistani television channels
- Sindhi-language media
- List of Sindhi-language newspapers
- List of Sindhi-language television channels
