= Sindhi Lungee =

Traditional Sindhi shawls of Pakistan

Sindhi Lungi or Lungee are a hand-woven gold embroidered cloth worn by Sindhi men on ceremonious occasions like weddings, Engagements, Cultural day and events etc. The Sindhi Lungis are traditionally used as a scarf/shawl, turban and as sash/cummerbund.

== Production ==
Sindhi Lungees are mostly produced in South of Sindh the major producing cities are Thatta, Karachi, Hala, Nasarpur, Tharparkar etc.

== Details ==
Sindhi Lungi is made of silk, cotton and wool, in both bright and soft colours with beautifully woven broad borders of silver and gold thread. The use of bright, bold and vibrant colors with gold zari on the Lungi make its worth and significance, these are worn as shawl and as turbans on ceremonious occasions.
