= Kuch Reh Jeewiyal Pall =

- Genre: Drama
- Starring: see below
- Country of origin: India
- Original language: Hindi
- No. of seasons: 1

Production
- Camera setup: Multi-camera
- Running time: Approx. 25 minutes

Original release
- Network: DD National

Kuch Reh Jeewiyal Pall is an Indian drama-series aired on DD National, which was later dubbed in Sindhi. The story revolves around a rivalry between two sisters.

This show started with telecast of three episodes a week, but due to high public demand the telecast was increased from 3 to 5 episodes a week.

It airs from Wednesday to Sunday, 9:20pm Pakistan time on Kawish Television Network (KTN TV). It also has repeats during the week.

== Plot ==
The story is of two sisters, their love and sacrifices for each other. Circumstances put them opposite each other as mother–in-law and daughter–in–law and they have to find their own path towards their values and ethics.

It is an account of a family that was united by its faith in its bond and never dreamt that it would just take a split second for this delicate bond to break. This story is a showcase of fragile relationships.

== Trivia ==
- It recently completed 100 episodes which is a landmark for Sindhi Television industry.
- This show started with telecast of 3 episodes a week, but due to its popularity the telecast was increased from 3 to 5 episodes a week.
- This show is distributed in Pakistan by Platform Productions.
- This show went off air in May 2007. Its repeat is scheduled to start soon.

== Cast ==
- Kanwaljit Singh
- Usha Bachani
- Avinash Wadhawan
- Neha Bam
- Madhavi Singh
- Vishal Watwani
- Kajal Shah
- Kunika
