= Sindhi cap =

Skullcap from Sindh, Pakistan

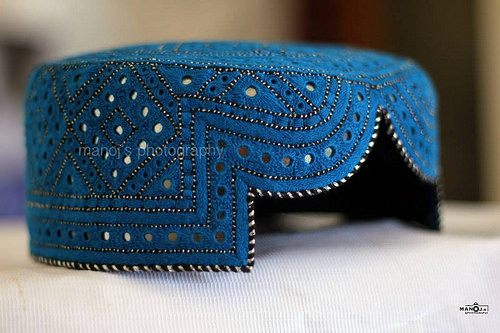
The Sindhi cap

The Sindhi cap (Sindhi: سنڌي ٽوپي, romanized: Sindhī ṭopī), also known as the Sarai cap (Sindhi: سرائي ٽوپي, romanized: Saraʾī ṭopī), is a skullcap worn mainly by the Sindhi people in Sindh, Pakistan. Together with Ajrak, the Sindhi cap is regarded as an essential part of Sindhi culture.

== History ==
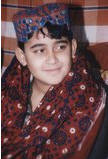
Zulfikar Ali Bhutto Jr. wearing a Sindhi cap

The Sindhi cap has its origin during the rule of the Kalhora dynasty. Over time Sindhi topi along with Ajrak has become the symbol of Sindhi culture. In Sindhi culture, the Sindhi cap is often given as a gift or as a sign of respect, along with the traditional Ajrak. Hand-woven Sindhi caps are a product of hard labour and are primarily produced in Tharparkar, Umerkot, Sanghar, and other districts of the Mirpurkhas division of Sindh. Each district has its own unique style, embroideries and preferred colors.

The Sindhi cap, along with Ajrak, is specially celebrated on Sindhi Cultural Day, which was originally named Sindhi Topi Day. In December 2009, for the first time, Sindhi Topi Day was celebrated in Pakistan’s Sindh province to celebrate the Sindhi cap, and Sindhi culture in general. The following year, the day was renamed Sindhi Cultural Day.

== Description ==
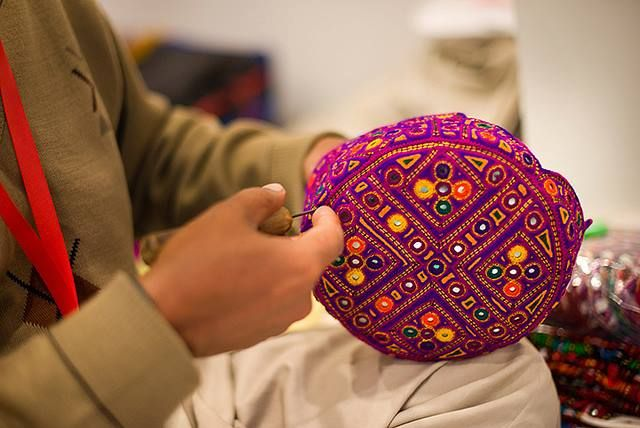
Details on handmade Sindhi cap

The hat is a cylindrical skullcap with an arch-shaped cut-out on the frontal side. Often worn with the Ajrak, the hat is embroidered with intricate geometrical designs with small pieces of mirrors or gemstones sewn into it.

== See also ==
- Culture of Sindh
- Sindhi Cultural Day
- Ajrak
