= Syed Saleh Muhammad Shah =

Pakistani radio and television broadcaster (1937–2007)

Fateh Khan
- سيد صالح محمد شاه
- Born: Syed Saleh Muhammad Shah; 3 September 1937; Dara Baig Mughal, Hyderabad, Sindh, British India
- Died: 2 September 2007 (aged 69); Hyderabad, Sindh, Pakistan
- Resting place: Sakhi Shah Muhammad graveyard, Hatri, Hyderabad
- Other name: Fateh Khan
- Occupations: Broadcaster; radio presenter; television actor
- Years active: c. 1957–2007
- Employer(s): Radio Pakistan; PTV
- Known for: Fateh Khan ji Katchery
- Children: 10
- Awards: Pride of Performance by the President of Pakistan in 1991

Syed Saleh Muhammad Shah (Sindhi: سيد صالح محمد شاه; 3 September 1937 – 2 September 2007), widely known by his on-air name Fateh Khan, was a Pakistani radio and television broadcaster who worked with Radio Pakistan and the Pakistan Television Corporation (PTV).

He was best known for his long-running Sindhi-language radio programme Fateh Khan ji Katchery ("Fateh Khan's court"), which aired from Radio Pakistan's Hyderabad station for nearly half a century.

== Early life and education ==
Shah was born on 3 September 1937 in the village of Dara Baig Mughal, off the National Highway 5 near Hyderabad, in the Sindh province of British India.

He completed his education by receiving his 'Alim Fazil' degree.

== Career ==
Shah came from a family of Sindhi folk poets which greatly helped him acquire the talent of reading folk poetry of Sindhi Sufi poet Shah Abdul Latif Bhittai on Radio Pakistan.

=== Radio ===
Shah rose to prominence around 1957 with Fateh Khan ji Katchery, broadcast by Radio Pakistan's Hyderabad station. The programme ran nearly uninterrupted for close to fifty years and drew a wide rural following, with Shah becoming so identified with the title role that audiences addressed him by the name "Fateh Khan". In this radio programme, Shah changed his voice to an old man from Sindh named 'Fateh Khan'. According to his obituary in Dawn newspaper, he was perhaps the only Radio Pakistan artist to have a programme named after his on-air persona.

A devotee of the Sindhi Sufi poet Shah Abdul Latif Bhittai, Shah recorded readings of Bhittai's verse in his own voice and was noted for his command of the poet's recitation.

=== Television and film ===
Shah was associated with PTV for around three decades. His Sindhi-language television programme Autaq was popular in rural areas. During the government of General Muhammad Zia-ul-Haq, an episode of Autaq in which Shah raised the slogan Jeay Bhutto — in support of the deposed prime minister Zulfikar Ali Bhutto, of whom he was an admirer — led to the programme being taken off the air for more than a year.

He also appeared as an actor in the Sindhi film Rang Mahal and in numerous Sindhi television and radio plays.

== Honours ==
- Pride of Performance award.by the President of Pakistan in 1991.

== Death ==
Shah died on the night of 1 September 2007 at the Civil Hospital in Hyderabad of a cardiac arrest, shortly after returning from Radio Pakistan's Hyderabad office where he had recorded what proved to be the final episode of Fateh Khan ji Katchery. He was 69, one day short of his seventieth birthday. He was buried the following day at the Sakhi Shah Muhammad graveyard near Hatri, Hyderabad, and was survived by his wife, and their five sons and five daughters.

His death anniversary has since been observed by Radio Pakistan and the Sindhi cultural community.
