= Daily Kawish =

Pakistani newspaper

Daily Kawish is a Sindhi-language daily newspaper in Pakistan.

== History ==
The newspaper was founded in 1990 and is part of the Kawish Group of Publication, which also publishes the newspaper Koshish and an eveninger Shaam. Muhammad Aslam Kazi is the newspaper's founder. It is the only newspaper that is published in the Sindhi language on a large scale.

== See also ==
- Hayat Ali Shah Bukhari, worked as assistant editor
- Sindhi-language media
