= Sindh TV =

Sindhi-language television channel in Pakistan

Sindh Television Network
- Country: Pakistan
- Headquarters: Hannan Centre, 13 Shahrah-e-Faisal, Umar Colony, Karachi, Sindh

Programming
- Picture format: (1080p 16:9, MPEG-4 HDTV)

Ownership
- Owner: Dolphin Media House
- Sister channels: Sindh TV News; Sindh Music; Sindh TV Sports

History
- Launched: October 2004; 21 years ago

Sindh TV HD is a Sindhi-based satellite television channel. The channel promotes "culture, sufism and affection for the Sindhi language" airing a wide variety of programs, such as a morning show, infotainment, music, sitcoms, dramas, cooking shows and kids programs.

== History ==
The channel began test transmission in October 2004 with regular transmission beginning later that month. It is owned by Karim Rajpar , Dolphin Media House, and its documentary staff includes journalists Ishaq Manghrio, Imdad Soomro, Hassan Dars, Buxan Mahranvi and Atta Rajar, the 1st Editor Imran Sarang Soomro who produced works on mountains, archaeological sites, forts, rivers, lakes and indigenous communities. A few months later, in 2005 Sindh TV started news bulletins from 5-10pm every hour. Abdul Razzaque Sarohi was news director and Aamir Rasool Sheikh was news editor.

== Broadcast ==
The channel shows 3-5 programs per day on its regular schedule, as well as posting daily clips and recordings onto its Facebook and YouTube channels.

== Sindh TV News ==
In November 2006, the transmission of the sister channel Sindh TV News was suspended by the Government of Pakistan. Transmission was resumed later that month after demonstrations in Sindh.

== See also ==
- Awaz Television Network
- Kawish Television Network
- List of Sindhi-language television channels
- List of news channels in Pakistan
