= Kawish Television Network =

- Country: Pakistan
- Headquarters: Karachi, Sindh, Pakistan

Programming
- Picture format: (1080i 16:9, MPEG-4, HDTV)

Ownership
- Owner: Kawish Television Network
- Sister channels: KTN News; Kashish Television Network

History
- Launched: 1 October 2002; 24 years ago

Links
- Website: www.ktntv.tv

Kawish Television Network (KTN) is the first private Sindhi TV channel in Pakistan. It is the most-watched private Sindhi-language general entertainment television channel worldwide. The channel is part of the Kawish Group.

== History ==
The channel was founded by Muhammad Aslam Kazi in 2002 and started with 6 hours of transmission. It has now grown from a small regional-language channel to the leading satellite channel of Pakistan, broadcasting 24 hours a day to areas of South Asia, Middle, and Far East Asia. It also started the first-ever music channel in the Sindhi language, Kashish TV. After that, in October 2007, KTN News started airing, covering news, current affairs programs, talk shows, documentaries, and reports.

== KTN Group ==
The Sindhi-language newspaper, Daily Kawish, is also part of the same group.

- Kashish, a music channel, is part of the KTN network.
- KTN NEWS, news and current affairs channel, airing 24-hour bulletins and talk shows.
- Chaalis Channel, regional entertainment channel, 24-hour movies and dramas.
- Platform Productions is a major distributor of television content to KTN and "Kuch Reh Jeewiyal Pall", Alif Laila being some of the best shows that are part of the Platform Productions collection.

== Attack on Staff ==
Munir Ahmed Sangi, a cameraman for KTN, was shot while covering a gunfight between members of the Unar and Abro tribes in the town of Larkana, Sindh in 2006.

In 2020, Aziz Memon, a journalist for KTN and Sindhi-language Daily Kawish was found dead with wire tied around his neck. He had been threatened by a local politician.

== See also ==
- List of Sindhi-language television channels
- Kuch Reh Jeewiyal Pall
- Daily Kawish
- Sindh TV
- Awaz Television Network
- List of Pakistani television stations
