= Hala Mała Łąka =

Former mountain pasture in the Tatra Mountains

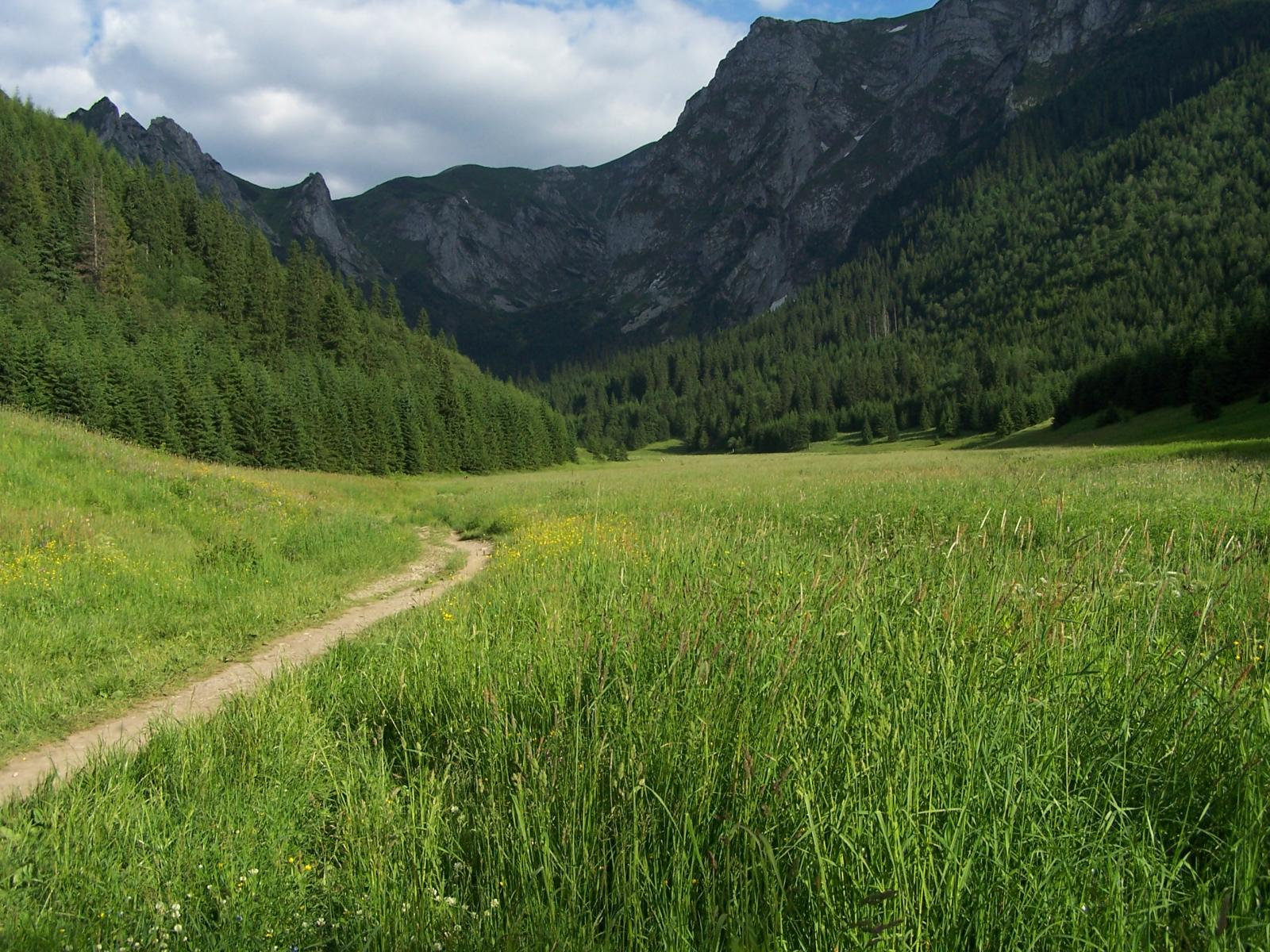
Yellow trail along the bottom of Mała Łąka Valley – lower part of Wielka Polana

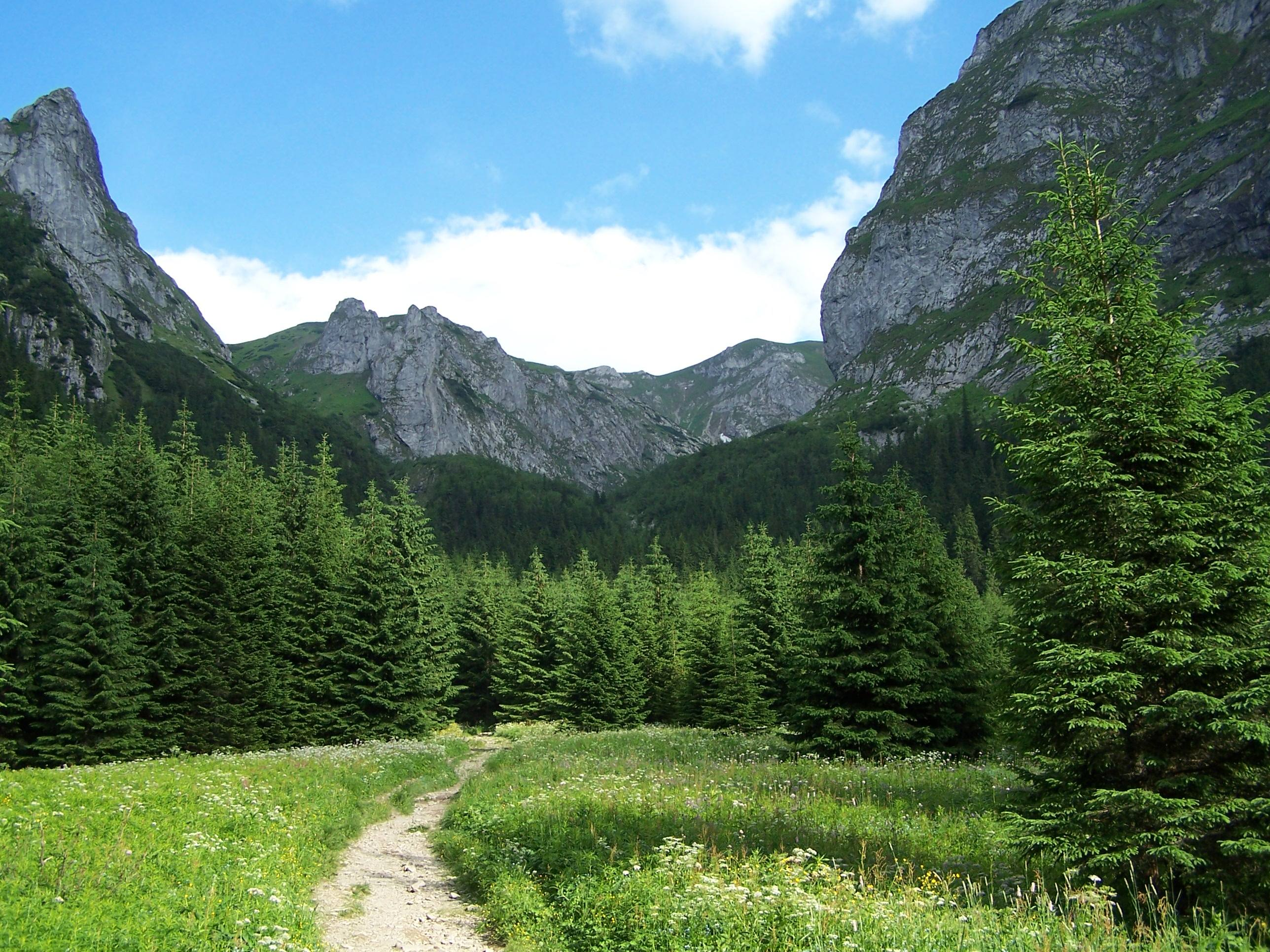
Yellow trail along the bottom of Mała Łąka Valley – upper part of Wielka Polana, gradually overgrowing with forest

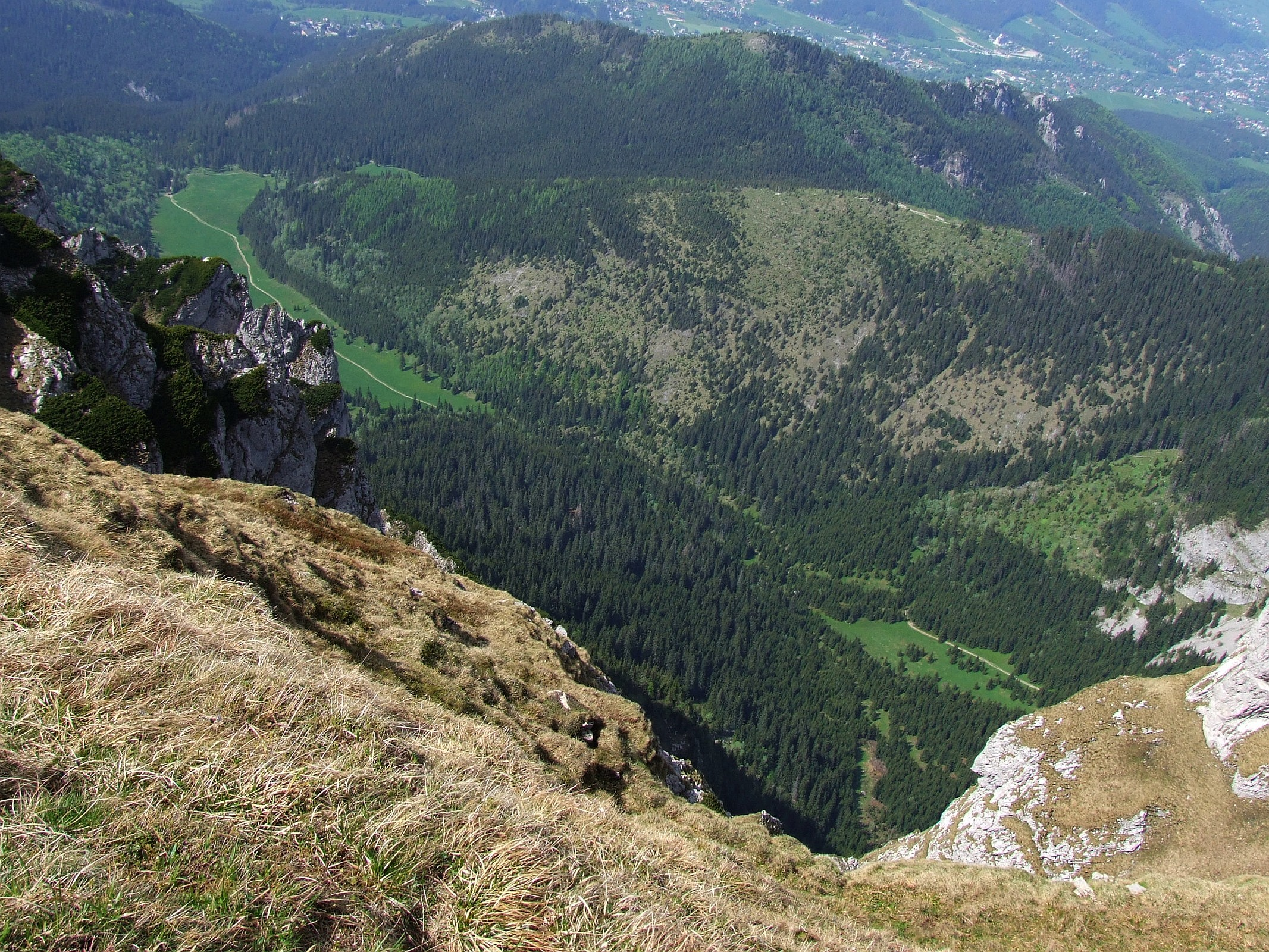
View from above

Hala Mała Łąka, commonly known as Mała Łąka, is a former mountain pasture in the Mała Łąka Valley of the Western Tatras. Historically used for grazing by local highlanders, it was one of the largest Tatra pastures, with its main clearing, Wielka Polana Małołącka, serving as a central area for shepherding activities. It was first documented in the 16th century and remained in use until the mid-20th century, when it was acquired by the Tatra National Park. Overgrazing led to significant environmental degradation, prompting conservation efforts following the cessation of pastoral activities. Today, Mała Łąka is an integral part of the protected landscape of the Tatra National Park, with its former pastures undergoing natural reforestation.

== History ==
Hala Mała Łąka was historically referred to by local highlanders as "Małałąka" or "ku Małołące". The origin of the name remains unclear, possibly a playful or ironic twist, as its main clearing, Wielka Polana Małołącka, is one of the largest in the Tatra Mountains. This clearing once hosted shepherding structures. In 1885, Bronisław Gustawicz wrote: "Hay sheds, cow barns, and huts give Mała Łąka the appearance of a small settlement amidst the Tatras". Besides Wielka Polana, the pasture included the much smaller Mała Polanka Małołącka, located below Grzybowiec Pass, still marked on some maps, as well as Rówienki, adjacent to the lower part of Wielka Polana on a moraine ridge, and the Wyżnie flat, situated above Wielka Polana along the valley floor.

The pasture spanned the middle and upper parts of Mała Łąka Valley, extending its grazing areas to the summits of Giewont, Kopa Kondracka, and Małołączniak. Before its acquisition by the Tatra National Park, its total area was 248.14 hectares (613.2 acres), comprising 15.3 ha (37.8 acres) of pastures, 15.0 ha (37.1 acres) of scrubland, 101.56 ha (250.9 acres) of wastelands, 36.28 ha (89.6 acres) of forests, and 80 ha (197.7 acres) of dwarf pine. Wielka Polana covered 9.69 ha (23.9 acres), while Mała Polanka spanned about 1.2 ha (3.0 acres). Additional easement lands in "lordly" (later state) forests, used by Mała Łąka's shepherds, amounted to 129.79 ha (320.7 acres).

According to easement agreements from the late 19th century, Mała Łąka could graze 600 sheep, 150 lambs, 50 cows, 25 heifers, 20 horses, and 8 oxen. Conversion rates allowed flexibility: 2 horses or oxen could be swapped for 3 cows, 2 heifers for 1 cow, 1 cow for 6 sheep, and 2 lambs for 1 sheep, totaling an equivalent of 1,195 sheep. Over time, as grazing lands depleted and were bought out, these numbers shrank. By the 1950s, it supported around 700 sheep, and in 1960, grazing (converted to sheep) was 550 head.

The earliest records mentioning the mountain pasture date to the 16th century, when Jan Pieniążek, leaseholder of Szaflary and Nowy Targ estates, granted "the Mała Łąka clearing for sheep grazing" to Krzysztof Stoch, headman of Pieniążkowice, in 1593. In 1701, Waligórski, a Pieniążkowice headman, sold it to the Budz family of Groń. By 1833, only Budz family members and a Jan Gąsienica (possibly a hired shepherd) grazed there. Over time, inheritance divisions made it a collective property of numerous highlander families, mainly from Groń and Murzasichle. By 1846, it belonged to eight owners: the western part to one Budz from Groń and two from Murzasichle, and the eastern part to Budz families from Groń and Zakopane plus the Walczak family from Zakopane. By 1873, there were 19 owners. This fragmentation slowed in the interwar period as some consolidated shares through buyouts, reaching 22 owners by the 1960s.

Wielka Polana ranks among the Tatras' most fertile clearings, formed on a former glacial lake bed filled with several alluvial fans, with sediment depths up to 65 meters (213 feet). Both Wielka and Mała Polana were mowed, with hay transported in winter by sled. Grazing occurred on surrounding slopes, gullies, scrublands, forests, and upper valley tiers – Niżnia Świstówka and Wyżnia Świstówka. Pasture areas were used communally, while the two clearings were cadastrally and legally divided, with owners' shares dictating livestock quotas.

In the early 20th century, sheep numbers exceeded the pasture's capacity, scaring off marmots, damaging the rich alpine flora of the Czerwone Wierchy massif, and causing severe erosion on the eastern slopes. Grazing continued until 1961–1964, when the Tatra National Park acquired or expropriated the entire mountain pasture from the highlanders. After shepherding ceased, eroded slopes recovered, and treeless areas, including Wielka Polana, began naturally reforesting.

== Hiking trails ==
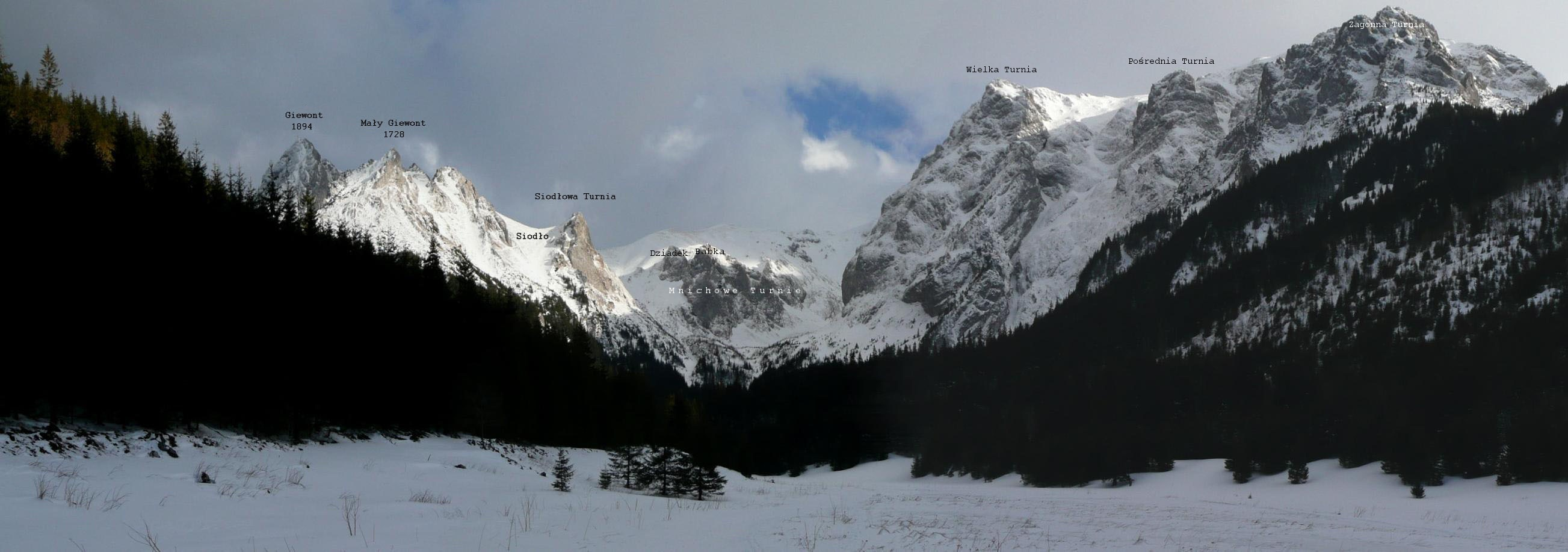
Areas of the former Hala Mała Łąka

The pasture hosts a junction of hiking trails.

- The black-marked Ścieżka nad Reglami from Strążyska Polana via Grzybowiec Pass to Wielka Polana Małołącka, continuing through Przysłop Miętusi, Miętusia Valley, and Zahradziska to Kościeliska Valley.
  - Time from Strążyska Polana to Wielka Polana Małołącka: 1 hour 10 minutes, return 1 hour 5 minutes
  - Time from Wielka Polana Małołącka to Kościeliska Valley: 55 minutes, return 1 hour 5 minutes
- The yellow trail from Gronik through Wielka Polana Małołącka, Głazisty Żleb, and Kondracka Pass to Kopa Kondracka.
  - Time from Gronik to Wielka Polana Małołącka: 55 minutes, descent 45 minutes
  - Time from Wielka Polana Małołącka to Kopa Kondracka: 2 hours 35 minutes, descent 1 hour 50 minutes
