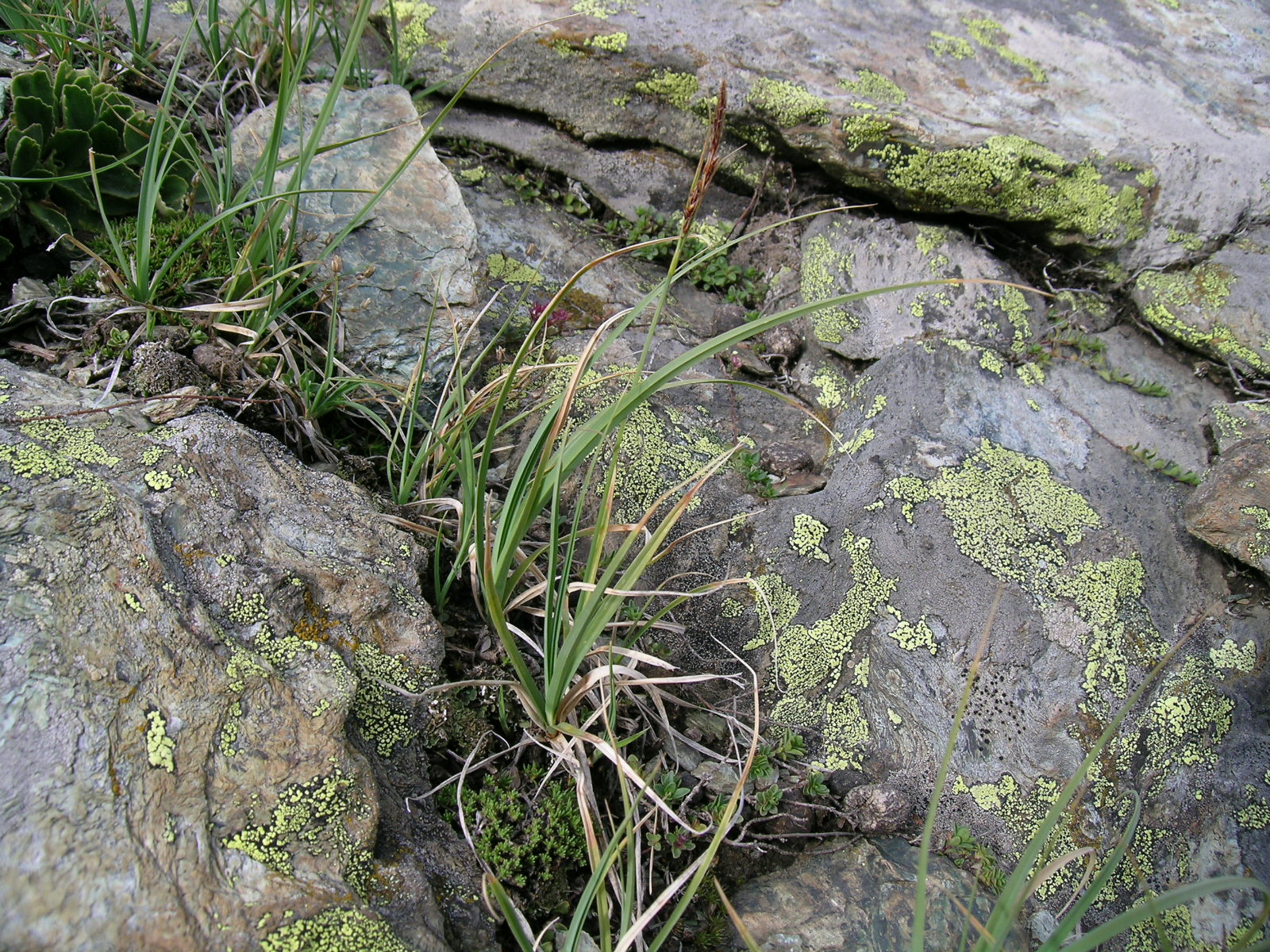

Scientific classification
- Kingdom: Plantae
- Clade: Tracheophytes
- Clade: Angiosperms
- Clade: Monocots
- Clade: Commelinids
- Order: Poales
- Family: Cyperaceae
- Genus: Carex
- Species: C. fimbriata

Binomial name
- Carex fimbriata Schkuhr

= Carex fimbriata =

Species of plant

Carex fimbriata is a tussock-forming species of perennial sedge in the family Cyperaceae. It is native to France, Italy and Switzerland. The plant stands 10–40 cm tall that often spreads by short, rooting stems, bearing stiff, flat leaves about 2–3 mm wide which remain shorter than its flower stalks. Its 5–15 cm inflorescence carries 1–4 erect female spikes topped by 2–3 smaller male spikes, each fruit enclosed in a glossy, three-angled sac fringed with hairs.

== Description ==
Carex fimbriata is a tufted perennial sedge standing 10–40 cm tall. Individual plants often produce short, creeping stems (stolons), which root at their tips to form new shoots. At the base, the leaf sheaths are reddish-brown and smooth, without fibrous shredding. The flowering stems are sharply three-angled and feel slightly rough.

The leaves are flat and stiff, about 2–3 mm wide, and remain shorter than the flower cluster (the inflorescence). The inflorescence itself is 5–15 cm long and typically bears 1–4 upright, cylindrical female spikes. These female spikes each hold many small flowers and sit on short stalks (peduncles), except for the lowest spike, which has a longer stalk and may droop slightly as it matures. Above the female spikes are 2–3 smaller male spikes. Leaf-like bracts subtend the spikes, and each individual flower is subtended by a scale (glume) that is sharply pointed, rust-coloured, and marked by a paler midrib.

Each female flower is enclosed in a small sac known as an utricle—2.5–4.5 mm long, triangular in cross-section and distinctly veined. The utricle is glossy, its colour ranging from rust to nearly black, and bears a fringe of hairs at its tip that form two small "teeth". Within the utricle, the fruit develops atop three thread-like styles (stigmas). Chromosome studies show a diploid number of 2n=42.

== Habitat and distribution ==
Carex fimbriata is confined to the high-alpine zone of the central Alps, where it grows exclusively on shallow, water-saturated soils derived from serpentinite (an ultramafic rock rich in magnesium and iron). These soils, known as rendzinas, are typically thin and sandy, with a moderately acidic pH (around 5.8) and almost complete cation saturation dominated by magnesium over aluminium and calcium. In this specialised habitat, C. fimbriata forms small, discrete stands in rock fissures and on steep, warm slopes—most often on south-east to south-west exposures between 2,600 m and 2,650 m above sea level. While its range was long thought to extend only from the Lautaret Pass (Hautes-Alpes, France) eastwards to the Poschiavo valley (Switzerland), recent surveys near the Col de la Traversette in the Queyras Massif extend its distribution some 50 km further south-west.

Within these serpentine grasslands, C. fimbriata is typically accompanied by drought-tolerant, neutral-soil species such as Festuca ovina and Carex sempervirens. By contrast, deeper or cooler sites on the same outcrops are colonised by species like Festuca violacea and Carex parviflora, while truly acid-loving plants are scarce. The occurrence of other serpentine specialists—such as pink stonecrop (Rhodiola rosea), nickel-accumulating pennycress (Thlaspi alpinum subsp. sylvium) and bitter cress (Cardamine plumieri)—demonstrate the ecological uniqueness of these alpine magnesian soils.

== See also ==
- List of Carex species
