= Ciemniak (mountain) =

Mountain peak in the Western Tatras

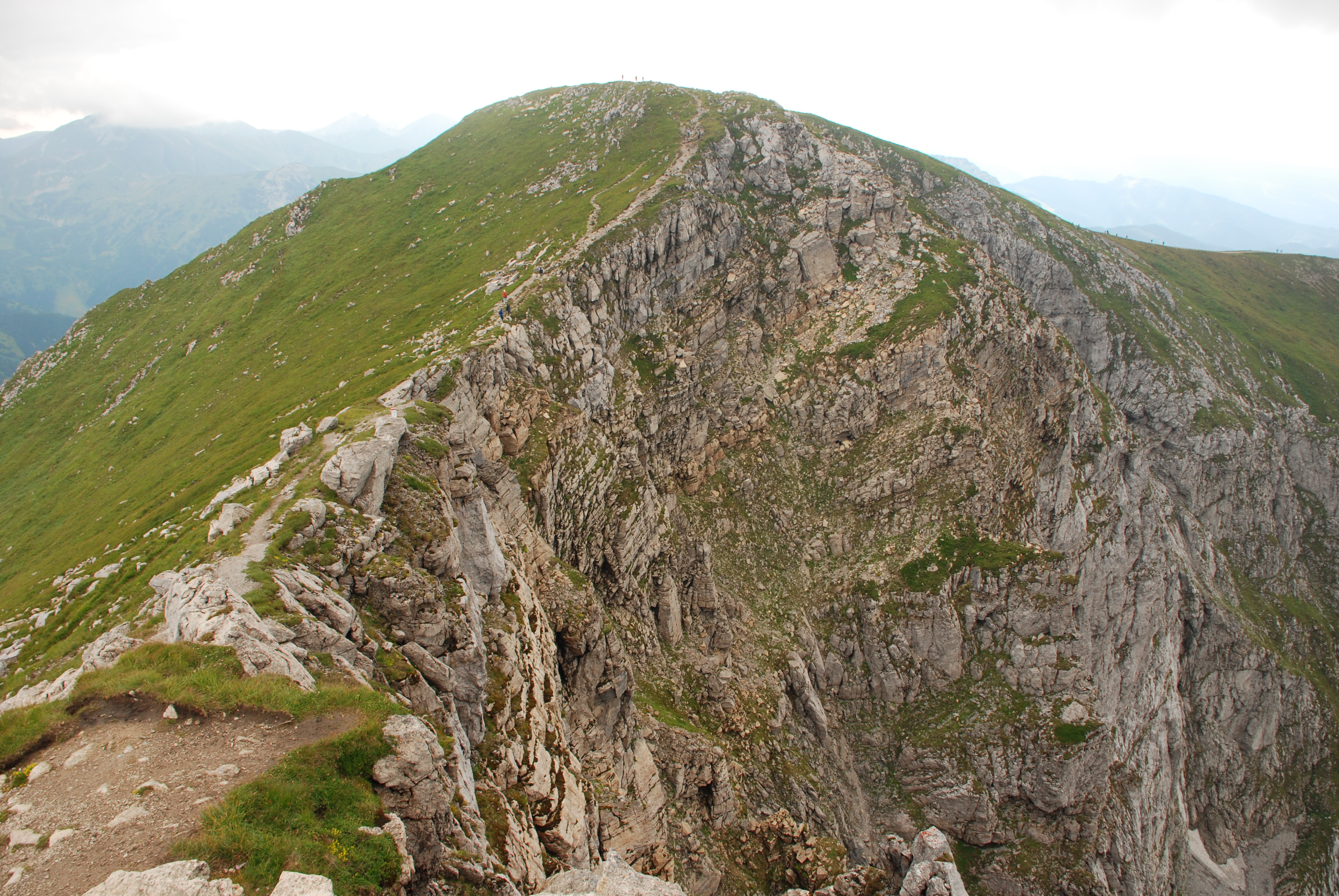
- Ciemniak viewed from above Mułowa Pass

Highest point
- Elevation: 2,096 m (6,877 ft)
- Prominence: 29 m (95 ft)
- Coordinates: 49°13′51.4″N 19°54′11.9″E

Geography
- Countries: Poland; Slovakia
- Parent range: Tatra Mountains, Carpathian Mountains

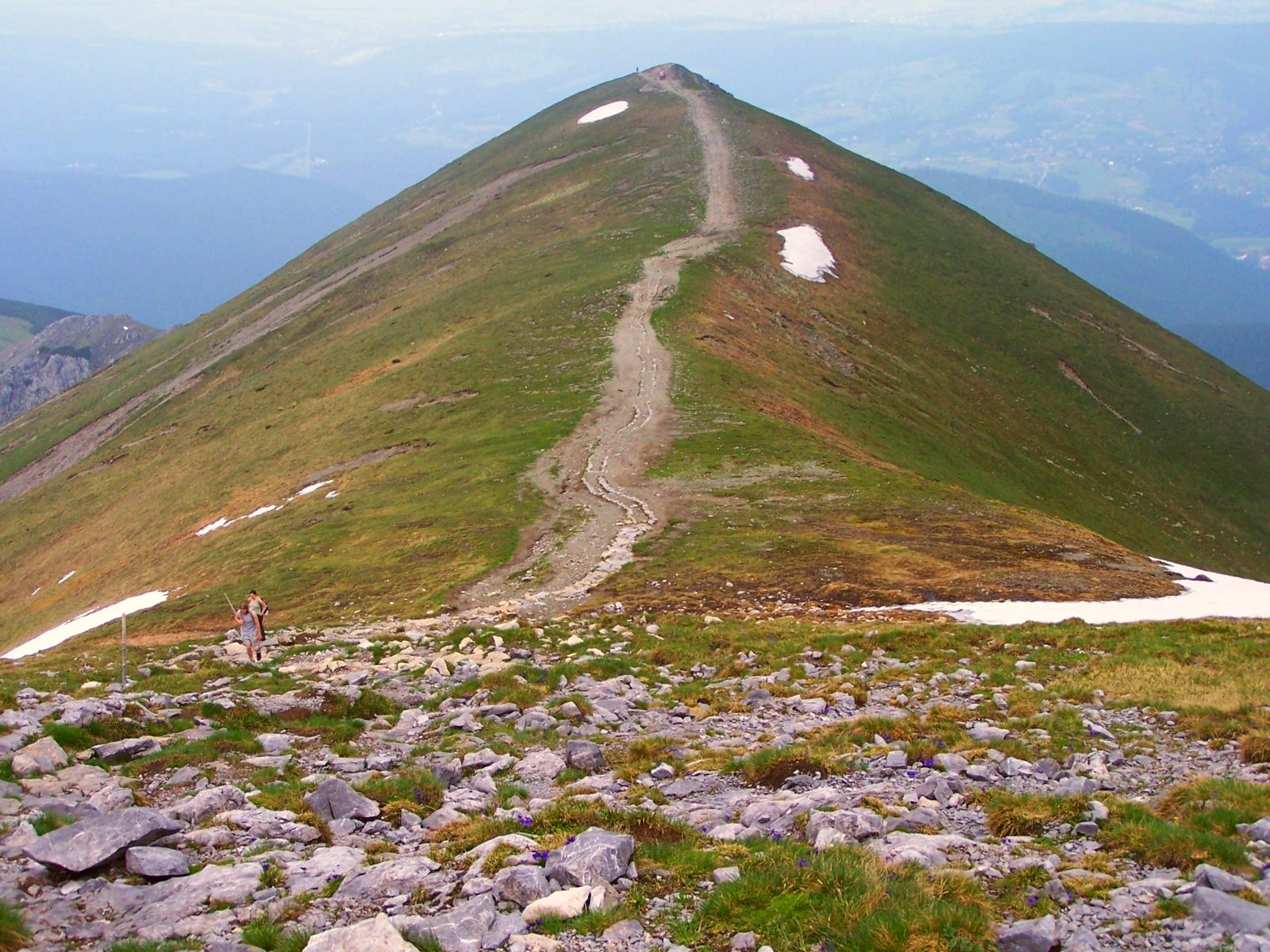
Ciemniak – north-western arête (Twardy Upłaz and Twarda Kopa)

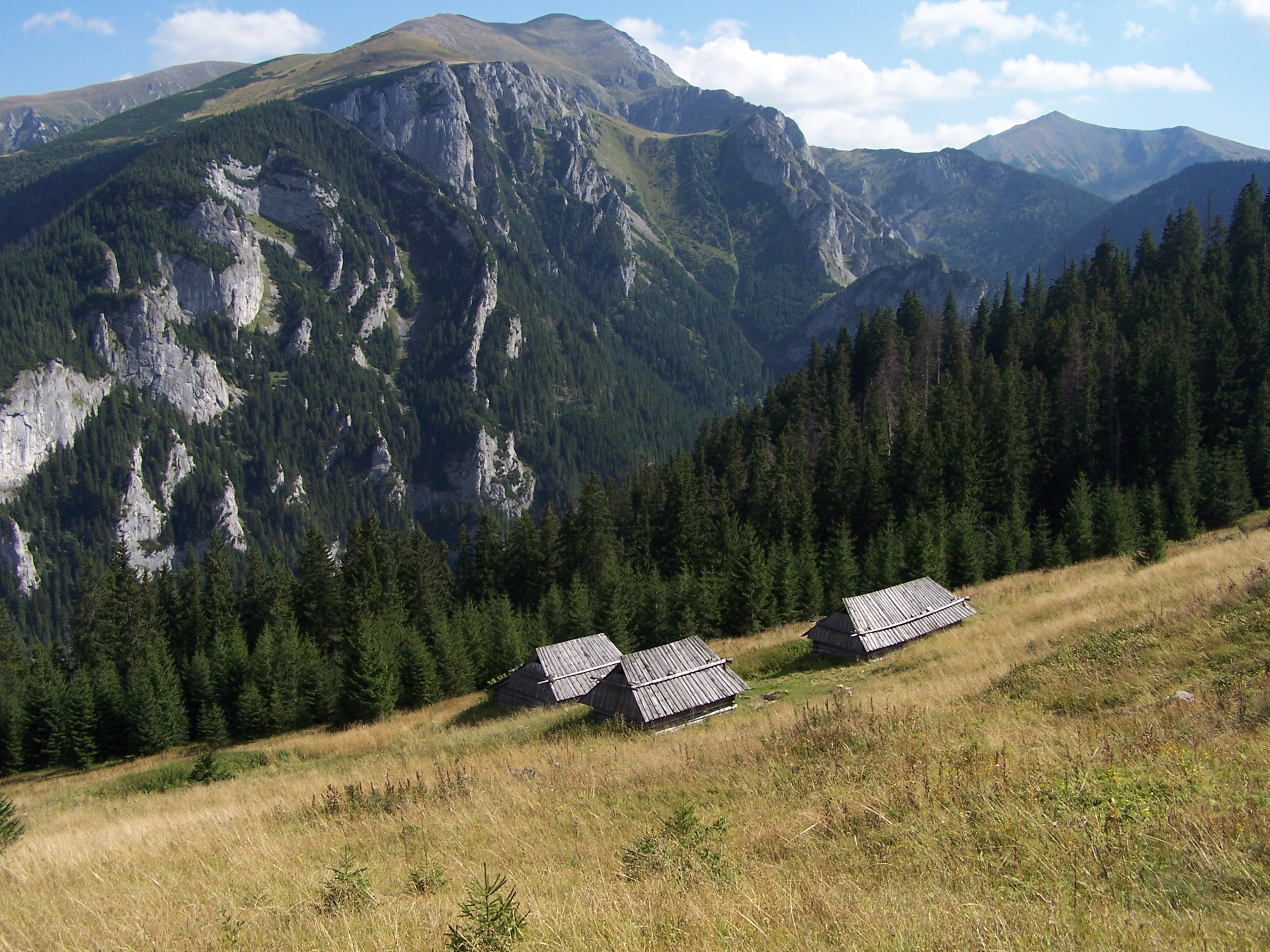
View from Polana na Stołach

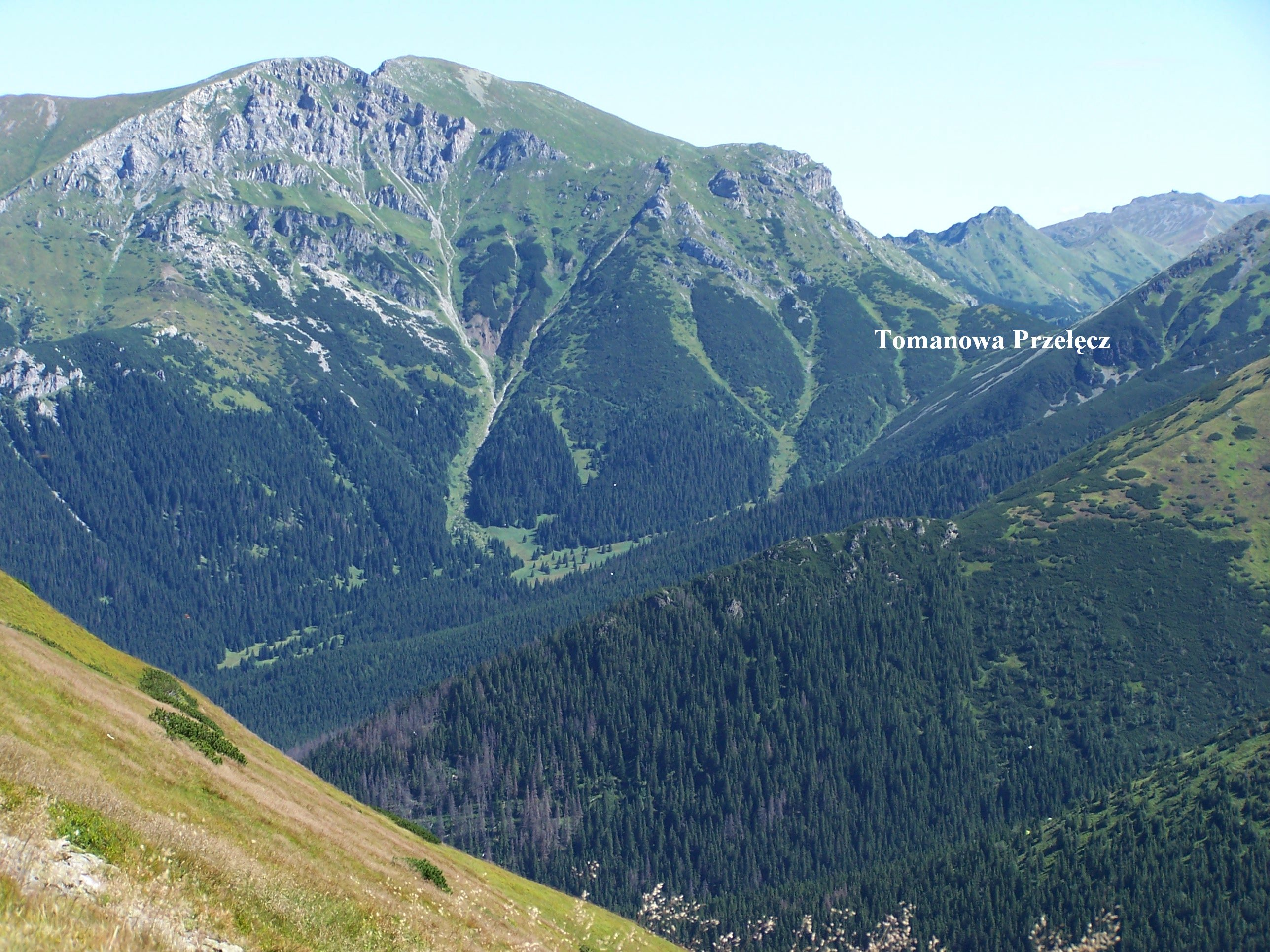
Western side of Ciemniak (seen from Ornak)

Ciemniak (Slovak: Temniak, 2,096 m a.s.l.) is the westernmost peak of the Czerwone Wierchy massif in the Western Tatras. Slovak sources list its elevation as 2,090 m.

== Topography ==
Ciemniak lies on the main arête of the Western Tatras, between the minor Mułowa Pass (2,067 m), separating it from Krzesanica, and the prominent Tomanowa Pass (1,686 m). Its summit forms a broad, flat dome from which four arêtes extend:

- eastward, through Krzesanica, as part of the main arête;
- southward, along the main arête over Tomanowe Stoły to Tomanowa Pass. At Ciemniak, the main arête of the Tatra Mountains bends 90°. Along this section are Wyżnia Mała Przełączka, Głazista Czubka, Mała Przełączka, and Głazista Turnia;
- the north-western arête of Ciemniak, separating Kościeliska Valley from Miętusia Valley. The highest section of this arête is Twardy Grzbiet with Twarda Kopa, which is separated from Ciemniak by the Szerokie Siodło;
- westward, the Wysoki Grzbiet.

Ciemniak rises above the valleys of Kościeliska, Tomanowa, Tomanowa Liptowska, Miętusia, and the glacial cirque of the small Mułowa Valley, which is bounded by steep, though not high, cliffs. The name likely derives from this valley, formerly called "Ciemna Valley" by shepherds.

== Geology ==
Ciemniak is composed of dolomite interbedded with limestone from the Middle Triassic period. Only the upper part of the north-western arête, Twardy Grzbiet, is capped with hard crystalline rocks. The steep western slope above Kościeliska Valley features numerous rock outcrops known as Rzędy Tomanowe, separated by the Czerwone Żlebki. These join below to form Czerwony Żleb, the only northern branch of Tomanowa Valley. Ciemniak's limestone structure contains many caves, including Miętusia Cave, Ice Cave at Ciemniak, Studnia w Kazalnicy, Szczelina w Ciemniaku, and Wysoka Cave. Just beneath the summit lies the Studzienka w Ciemniaku cave.

== Flora ==
By mid-summer, the stems of highland rush growing on Twardy Grzbiet begin to brown, giving the peak a reddish hue. The summit is home to rich flora, including both limestone- and granite-preferring species. Professor Władysław Szafer attributed this to the presence of granite gravel, a remnant of an earlier crystalline rock layer. Rare alpine plants identified here include: Androsace obtusifolia, Omalotheca hoppeana, white genepi, alpine dwarf orchid, Cerastium latifolium, drooping saxifrage, Draba tomentosa, creeping sibbaldia, Plantago atrata, and small-flowered sedge.

== History ==
In the 19th century, Ciemniak was known as the Upłaziański Czerwony Wierch. The entire northern arête once belonged to Hala Upłaz and was used for grazing all the way to the summit. In the same period, iron ore mines operated in Czerwony Żleb and the Czerwone Żlebki.

== Tourist trails ==
- A red trail from Cudakowa Glade in Kościeliska Valley via Adamica, Upłaz Glade, Chuda Przełączka, and Ciemniak to Kasprowy Wierch and beyond.
  - Time from Cudakowa Glade to Ciemniak: 3 h 25 min, descent: 2 h 30 min
  - Time from Ciemniak to Kasprowy Wierch: 3 h, return: 2 h 55 min
- A green trail through Twardy Grzbiet, Chuda Przełączka, Czerwony Żleb, and Tomanowa Valley to the shelter on Hala Ornak. Until Chuda Przełączka it overlaps with the red trail.
  - Time from Ciemniak to Hala Ornak: 2 h 40 min, ascent: 3 h 40 min
