= Miętus Valley =

Valley in the Western Tatras, Poland

Coordinates: 49°15′40″N 19°53′15″E

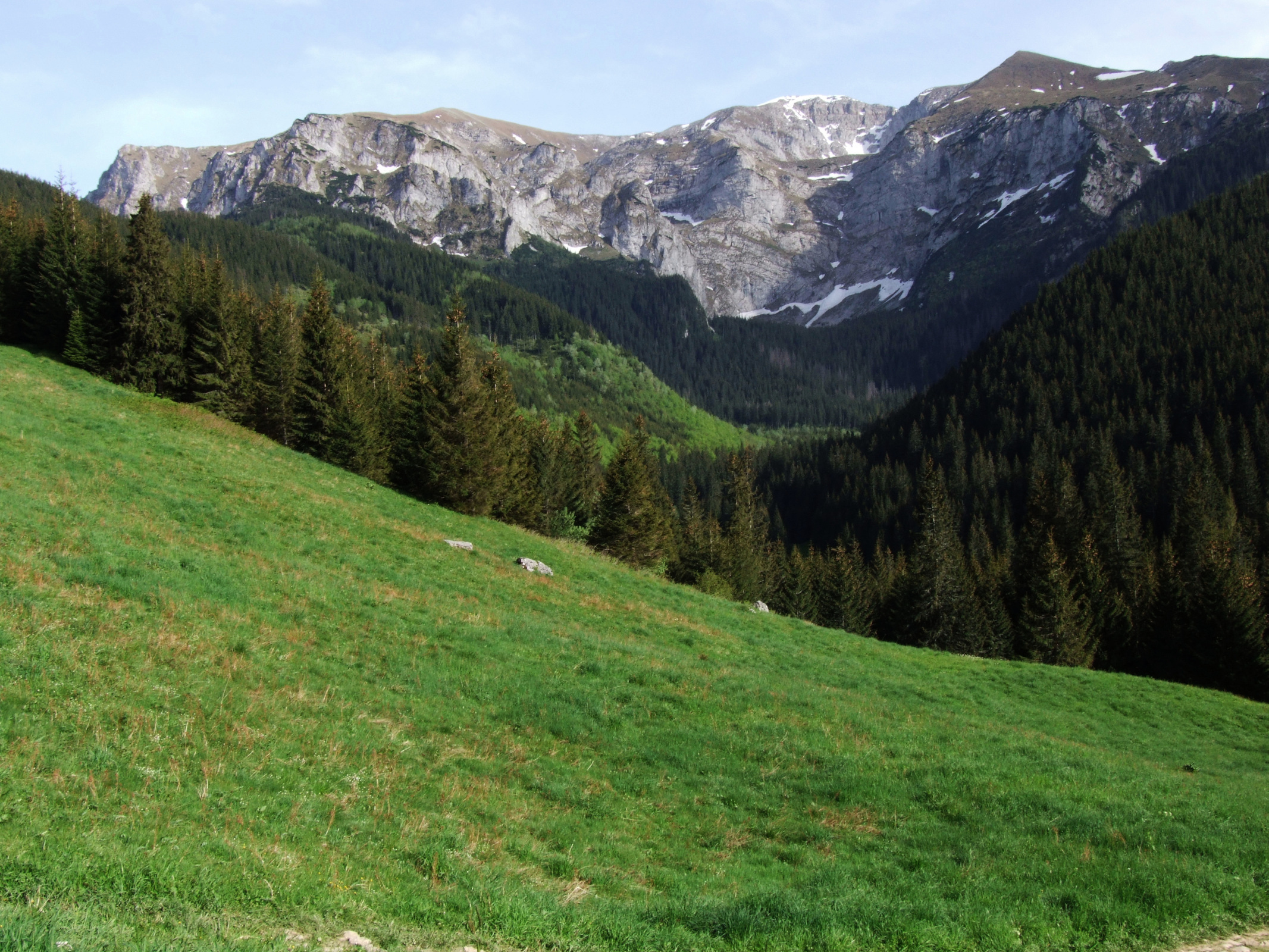
View of Czerwone Wierchy from Miętusia Valley

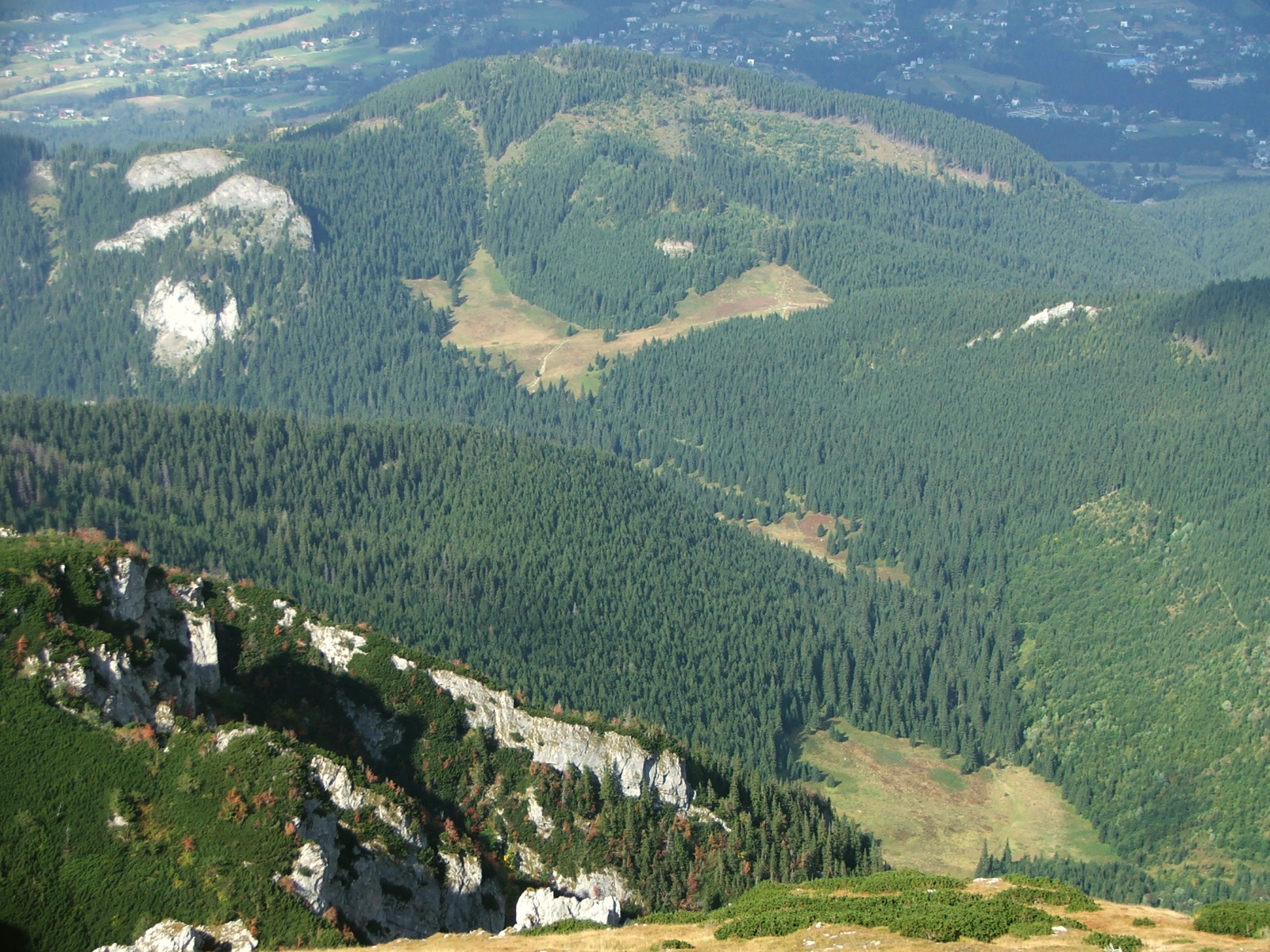
Miętusia Valley with Hruby Regiel in the background

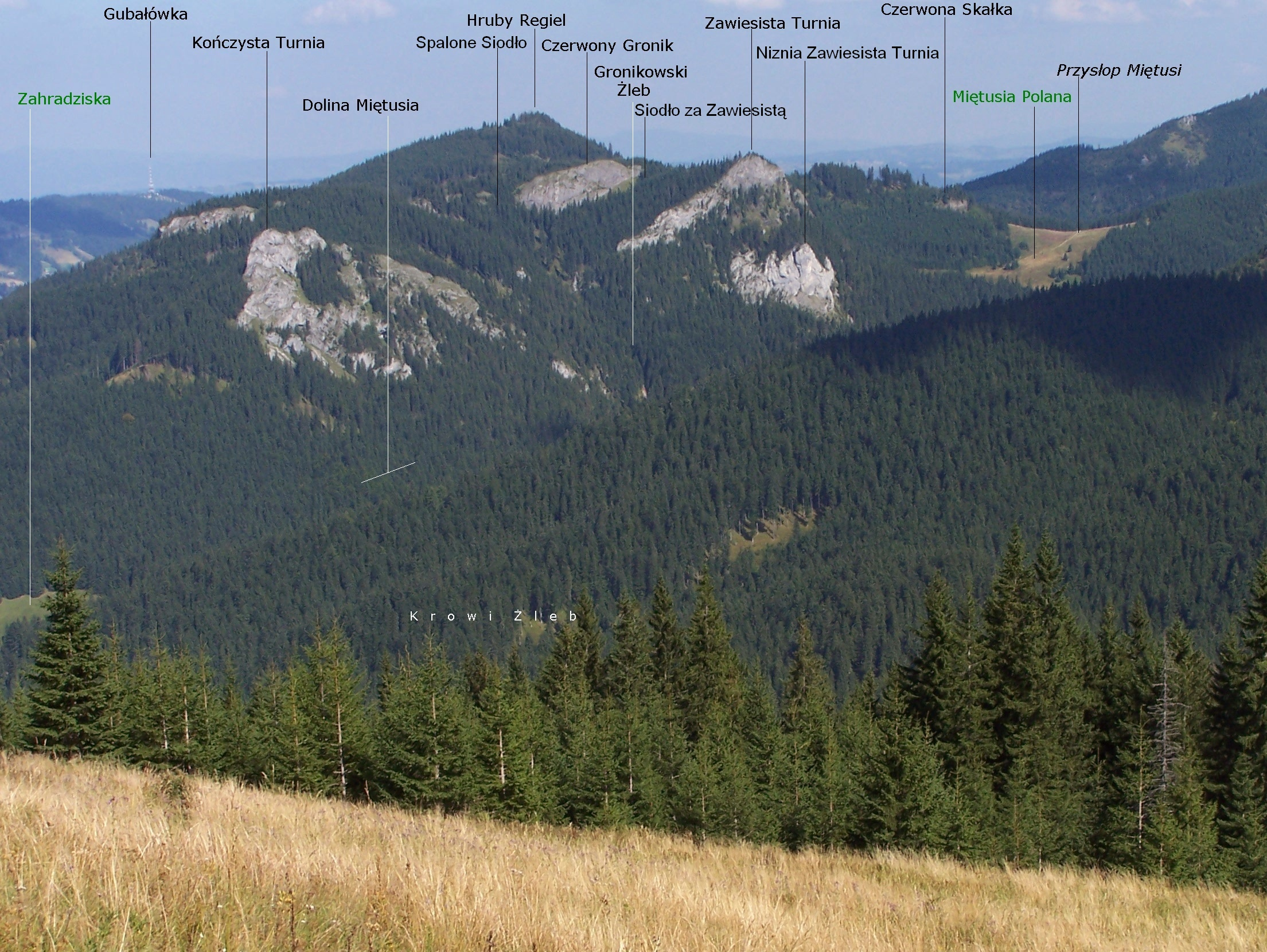
Lower part of Miętusia Valley

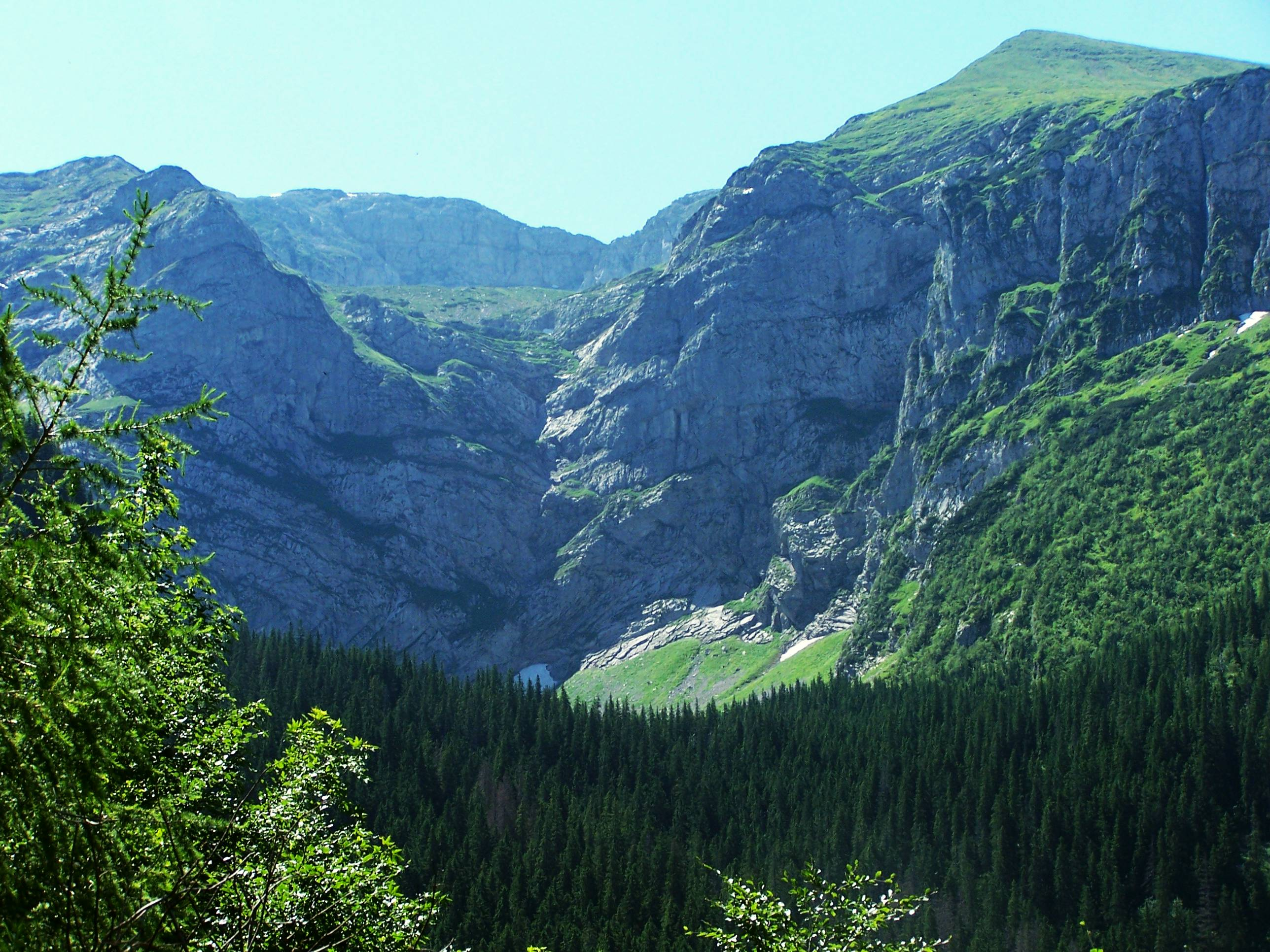
Wielka Świstówka

The Miętus Valley (Polish: Dolina Miętusia) is the largest side branch of Kościeliska Valley in the Polish Western Tatras. It covers an area of approximately 6 km² and stretches about 4.5 km in length.

== Topography ==
The two valleys converge where their streams meet, just above Wyżnia Kira Miętusia, at an elevation of 947 m above sea level.

The boundaries of Miętusia Valley are defined by three arêtes: the northwest arête of Ciemniak, the main Tatra arête from Ciemniak to Małołączniak, and the northwest arête of Małołączniak, running through Czerwony Gronik to Kończysta Turnia. The lower part of the valley runs roughly east-west and is a typical river valley. At the lower end of Niżnia Miętusia Rówień, the valley shifts to a southeast direction, and its character changes due to glacial shaping. The valley features three distinct levels separated by rocky knickpoints:

- The first level comprises Niżnia and Wyżnia Miętusia Rówień,
- The second level forms a cirque known as Wielka Świstówka,
- The third level consists of two twin hanging valleys: Litworowa Valley and Mułowa Valley.

The valley also has several side branches. On the orographically right slopes, from bottom to top, these include Gronikowski Couloir, Wodniściak, and Kobylarzowy Couloir. On the left slopes, from top to bottom, are Mała Świstówka, Wołowy Couloir, Szeroki Couloir, and Krowi Couloir.

== Natural features ==
The valley is primarily composed of sedimentary rocks, such as dolomite and limestone, with only the peak of Małołączniak and Twardy Grzbiet covered by crystalline rocks. This geological composition has led to significant karst phenomena, including underground water flow, karst springs, disappearing streams, and numerous caves. The permanent Miętusi Stream emerges at the northern end of Wyżnia Miętusia Rówień and flows into Kościeliski Stream. Side valleys and gullies are generally dry. Notable caves include Mała Cave, Kozia Cave, Ptasia Studnia, Miętusia Cave, Piwniczka, and Studnia w Kazalnicy. The valley hosts a diverse flora, including rare Polish species such as drooping saxifrage and ghost orchid, though the latter's presence has not been recently confirmed and is believed extinct at its known site. Other rare plants include Saxifraga wahlenbergii, Delphinium oxysepalum, Oxytropis carpatica, the rare twinflower (only two sites in Poland), and bearberry (few sites in the Tatras).

== History ==
The valley's name derives from the Miętus family, village heads from Ciche, who received grazing rights from King Sigismund III Vasa in the late 16th century. Much of the valley was part of Hala Miętusia, which included five clearings: Wyżnia and Niżnia Miętusia Rówień, Miętusia Polana, Jaworzynka Miętusia, and Zahradziska. Grazing ceased about a decade after the establishment of Tatra National Park, and former grassy areas have gradually become overgrown. Since the 1980s, limited cultural grazing has been reintroduced on Zahradziska. The valley also has a mining history, with low-grade iron ore extracted until 1800 and transported via the Hawiarska Road to Kuźnice. Mining sites included the Fortuna, Przysłop, and Wantula adits.

== Hiking trails ==
- A black hiking trail runs through the lower part of the valley, part of the Ścieżka nad Reglami trail connecting Mała Łąka Valley to Kościeliska Valley. Time from Przysłop Miętusi to Kościeliska Valley: 40 min (50 min uphill).
- A blue trail, known as the Hawiarska Road, runs from Gronik through Przysłop Miętusi and Czerwony Grzbiet to Małołączniak. From Przysłop Miętusi, it follows the eastern slopes of Miętusia Valley below the Miętusi Skoruśniak arête.
  - Time from Gronik to Przysłop Miętusi: 1 h (45 min downhill).
  - Time from Przysłop Miętusi to Małołączniak: 3 h (2 h 15 min downhill).
