= Krzesanica =

Mountain in Slovakia and Poland

- Kresanica
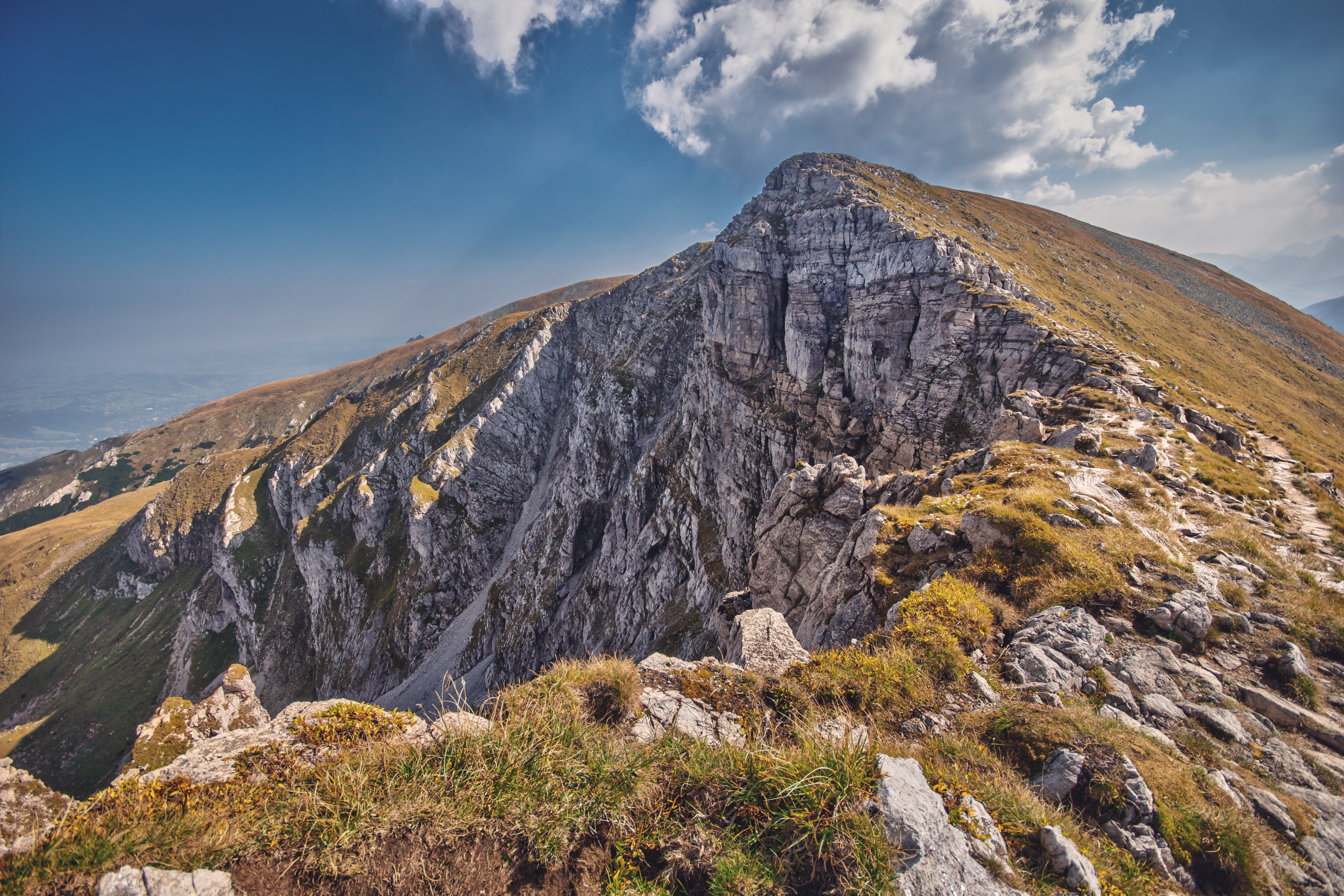
- Krzesanica seen from Ciemniak

Highest point
- Elevation: 2,122 m (6,962 ft)
- Prominence: 323 m (1,060 ft)
- Coordinates: 49°13′54″N 19°54′34″E

Geography
- Countries: Poland and Slovakia
- Regions: Lesser Poland and Prešov
- Parent range: Western Tatras, Tatra Mountains

Krzesanica (Slovak: Kresanica) is a mountain in the Western Tatras mountain range, situated on the main ridge of the Tatras between Ciemniak and Małołączniak, on the border between Poland and Slovakia and towering over the Miętus Valley to the north and the Tichá Valley to the south. At 2122 meters, it's the highest of the four peaks making up the Czerwone Wierchy group of peaks, as well as the highest limestone peak in Western Tatras and in Poland.

The mountain is the namesake of a cliff located near the Hala plateau on King George Island.
