= Kościeliska Valley =

Valley in Poland

Kościeliska
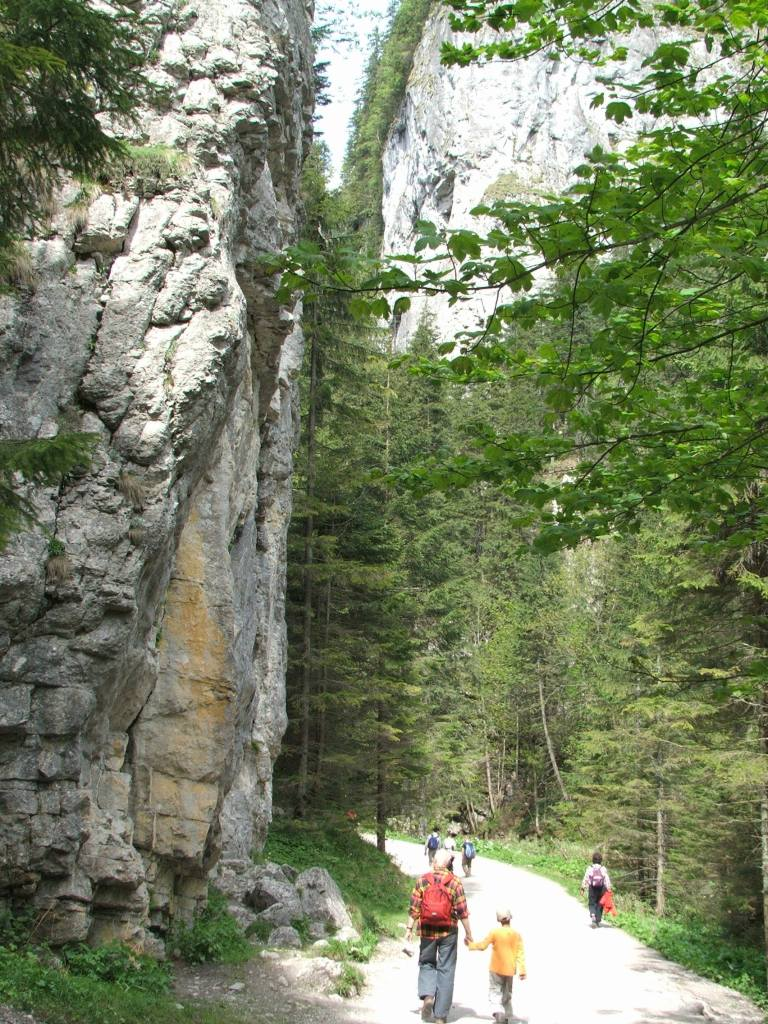

- Location within Poland
- Length: 9 kilometres (5.6 mi)

Geography
- Location: Lesser Poland, Western Tatras (Tatra National Park)
- Coordinates: 49°15′14″N 19°51′1″E
- Mountain range: Tatra
- Interactive map of Kościeliska

The Kościeliska is a valley in Poland, in Tatra Mountains, Western Tatras, Poland. It stretches from the village of Kiry, about 9 km, right up to the main ridge of the Tatras. Halfway up is the Ornak mountain refuge, built in 1948. Is reached by road from Zakopane - 7 km.

== Geography ==
The valley is narrow near the exit, but further up it fans out into several lateral branches, above which rise the rounded summits of the Western Tatras, the highest being Mt. Bystrá, on the Slovakia side of the frontier.

The upper part of the valley (the Hala Tomanowa and Hala Pyszna) have been constituted as a strict nature reserve, thus forming a sanctuary for the flora and fauna peculiar to them.

The whole valley is pervaded with the aura of old legends about hidden treasure. There are ancient mining traditions going as far back as the 15th century.

In the 19th century, Kościeliska valley was one of the strongest and largest metallurgical centres in the area. In the neighbouring mountains, various metals were found, mainly silver and also iron ore.

This valley owes its exceptional charm not only to its beauty spots, but also to its numerous forms of characteristic of limestone country: caves, wells, shaped rocks and crags. There are about 70 larger and smaller caves here, the longest of which are Jaskinia Zimna (6 km) or Jaskinia Wysoka – Za Siedmiu Progami (11,5 km), and the deepest Jaskinia Miętusia (200 m) or Bańdzioch Kominiarski (570 m).

Among the most interesting tourist spots in the valley are:

- Lodowe Źródło (Icy Spring)
- Jaskinia Mroźna (Frosty Cave), Jaskinia Mylna (False Cave), Jaskinia Raptawicka (Raptawicka Cave)
- Wąwóz Kraków i Smocza Jama (Kraków Gorge with Dragon's Den) - one of the most picturesque part of the valley.
- Hala Pisana (Pisana Alp)
- Staw Smreczyński (Smreczyński Pond)

== Trails ==
In the lower part of the Dolina Kościeliska, the red trail branches off Polana Upłaz and takes one to the summit of Ciemniak (2,090 metres AMSL), a mountain in the Czerwone Wierchy (Red Peaks) group of peaks. The blue trail leads to the Polana na Stołach. The black path "Ścieżka nad Reglami" leading to Chochołowska Valley.

From the middle section of the valley, the green trail leads from the Ornak refuge along the Dolina Tomanowa (Tomanowa Valley) to the Czerwone Wierchy. The yellow trail leads up to the pass Iwaniacka Przełęcz and thence to the summit Ornak (1,854 metres). The green trail leads to the pass Raczkowa Przełęcz. About a 35 minutes walk along the black trail from the Refuge leads to the mountain pond Smreczyński - one of the very few in this part of Tatra Mountains.

== See also ==
- Miętusia Valley

== Gallery ==
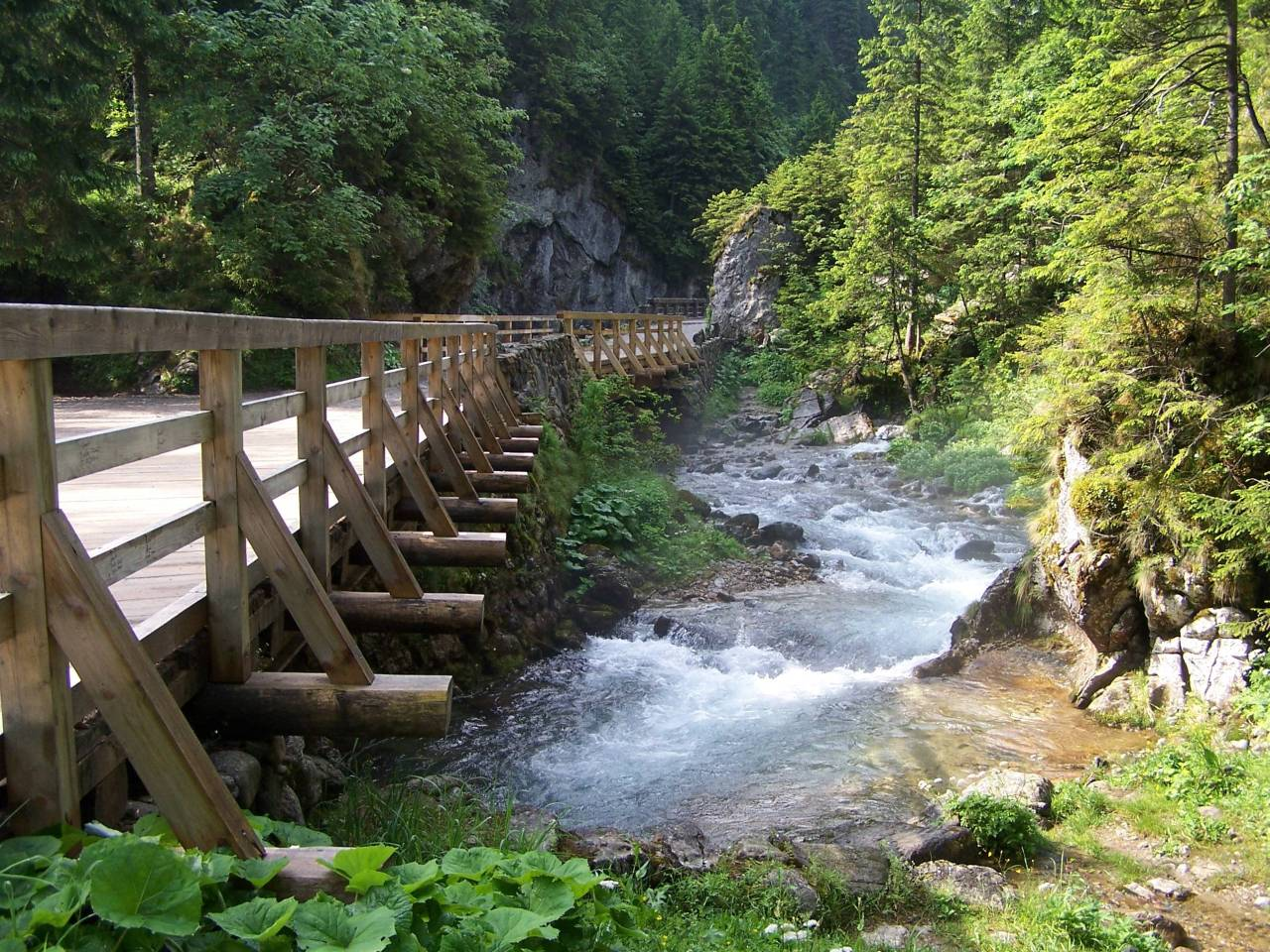
Valley

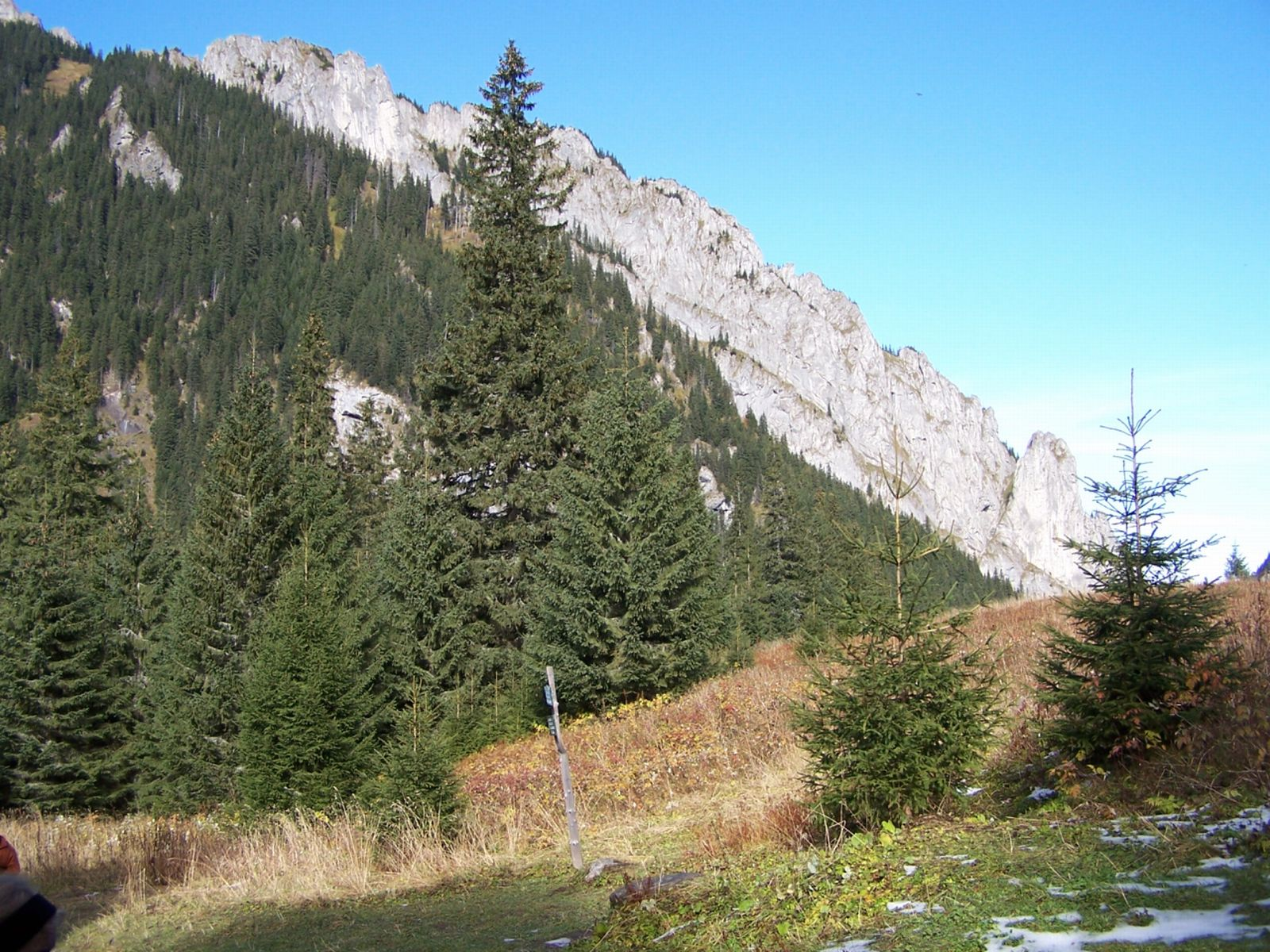
Raptawickie Turnie

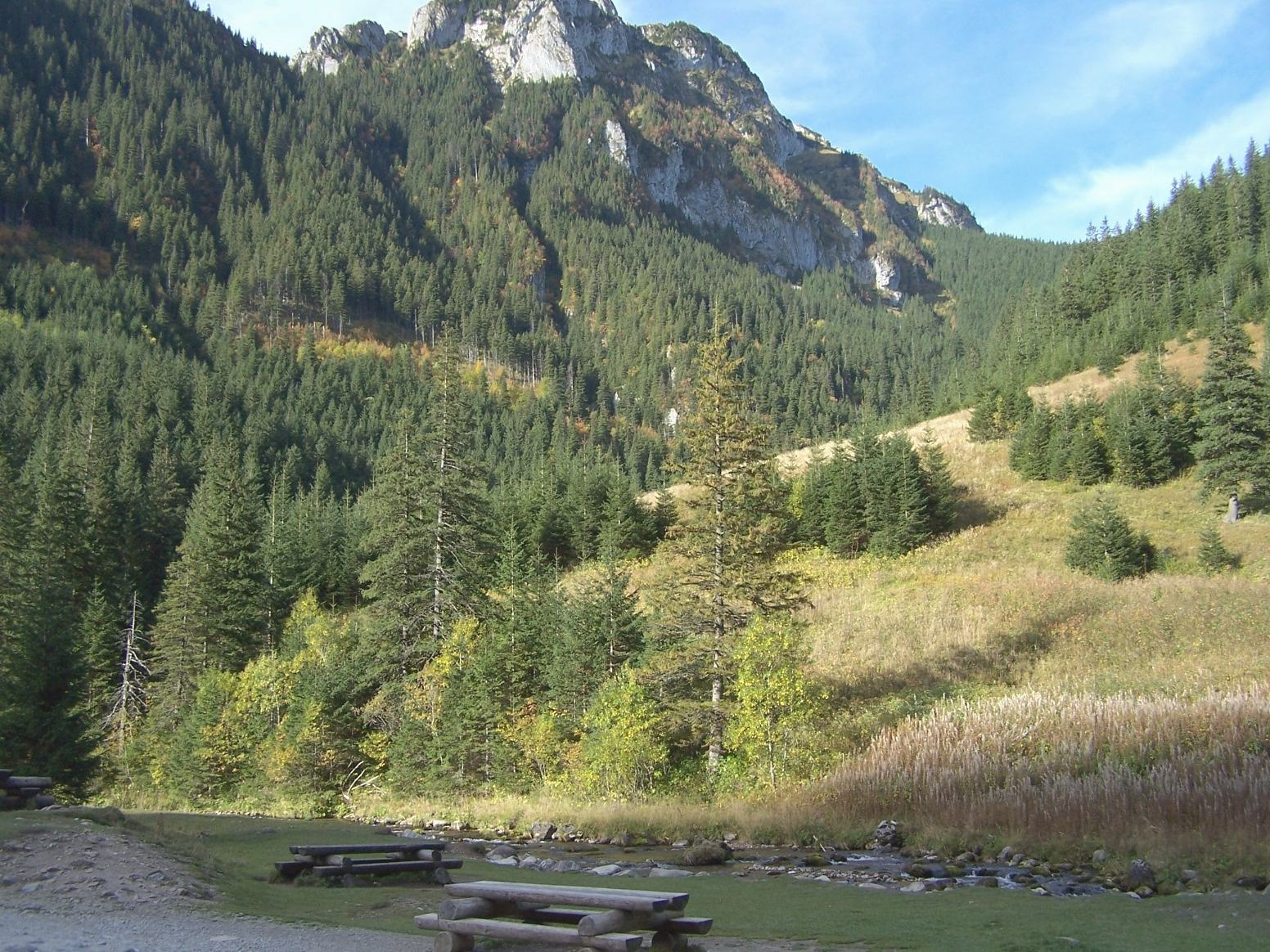
Valley

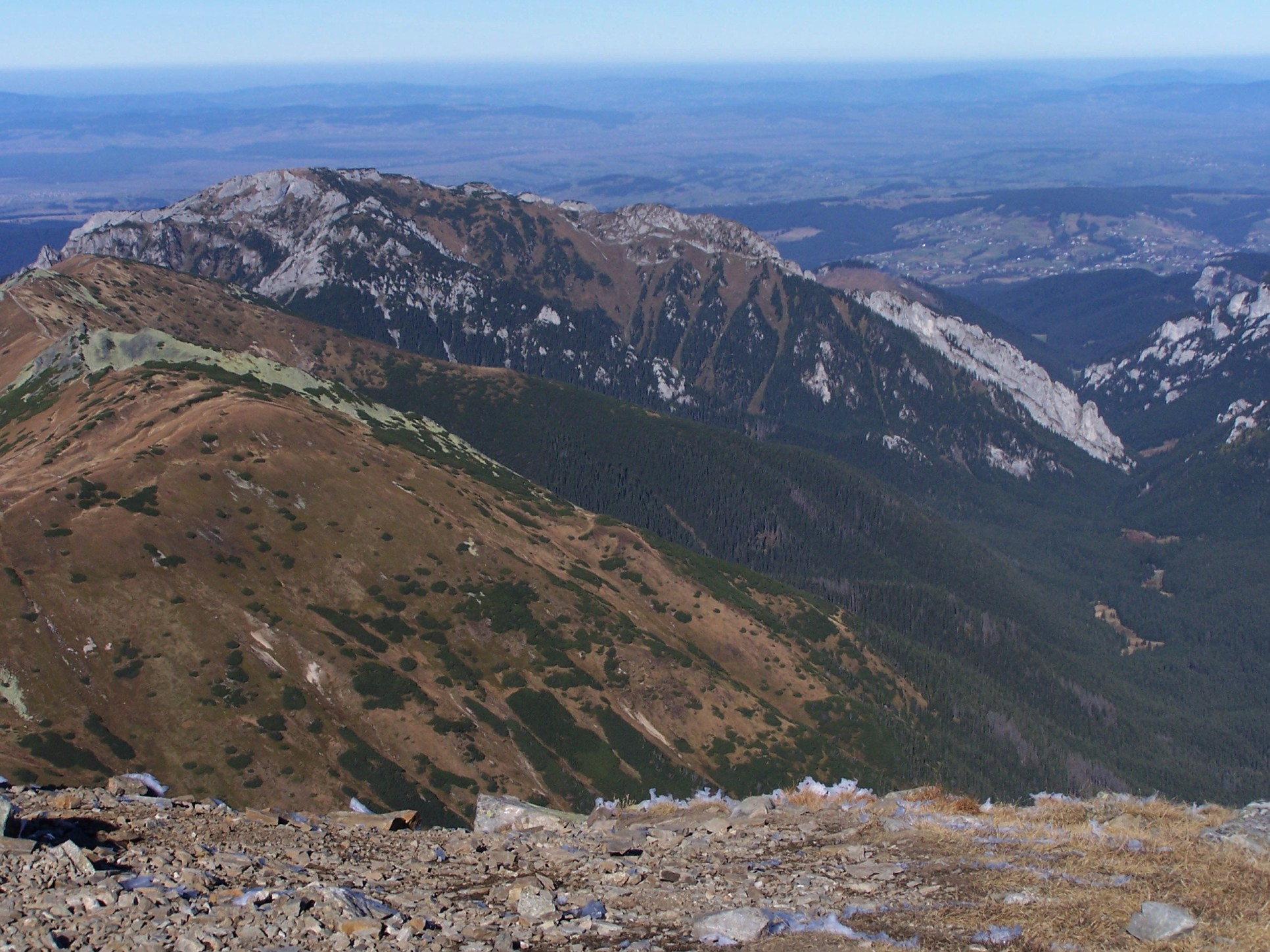
View from Bystra

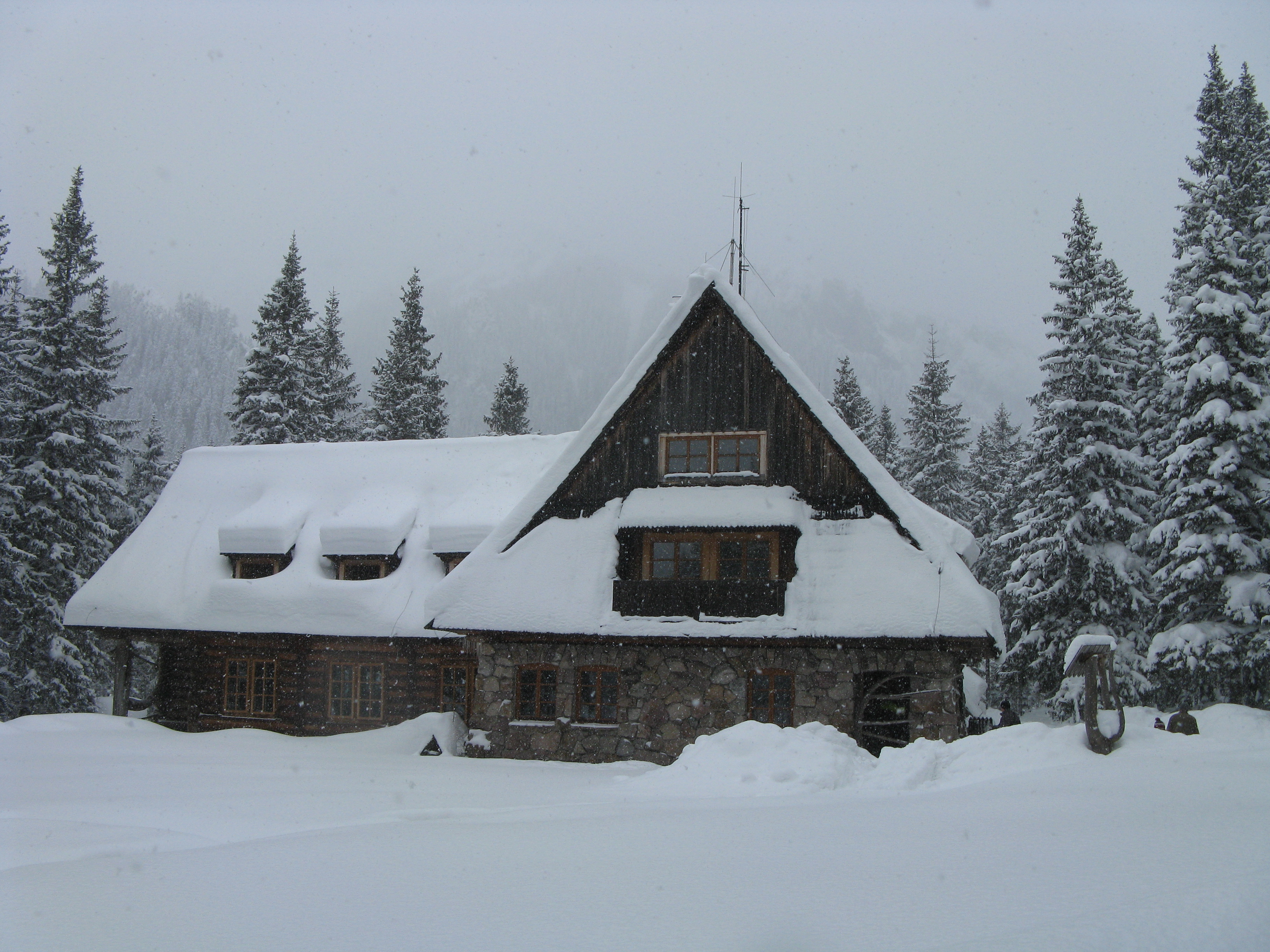
Ornak refuge

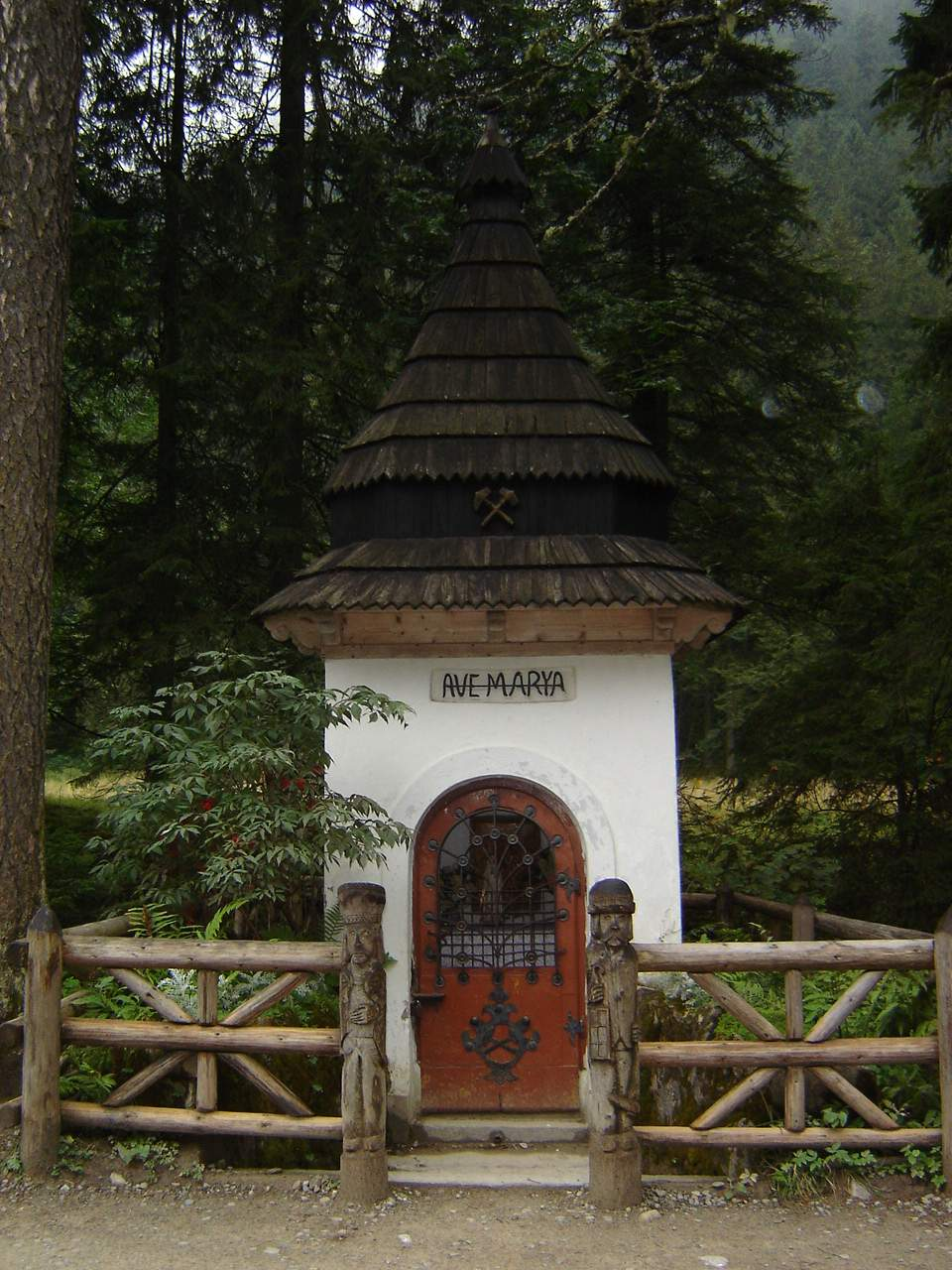

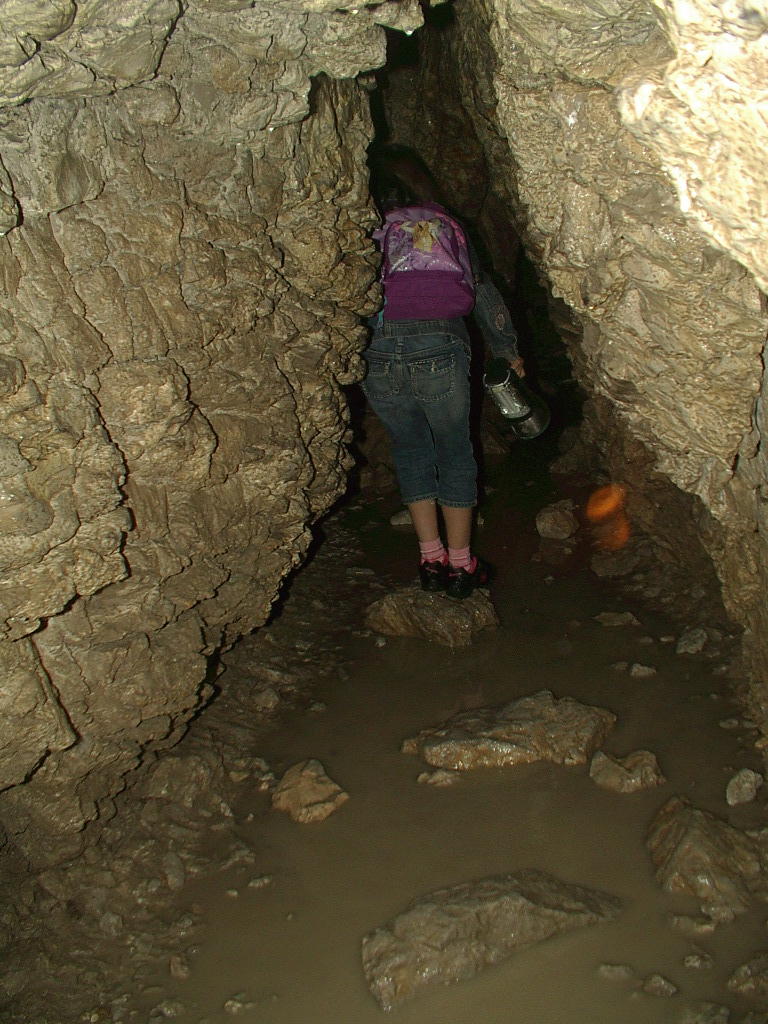
Mylna Cave

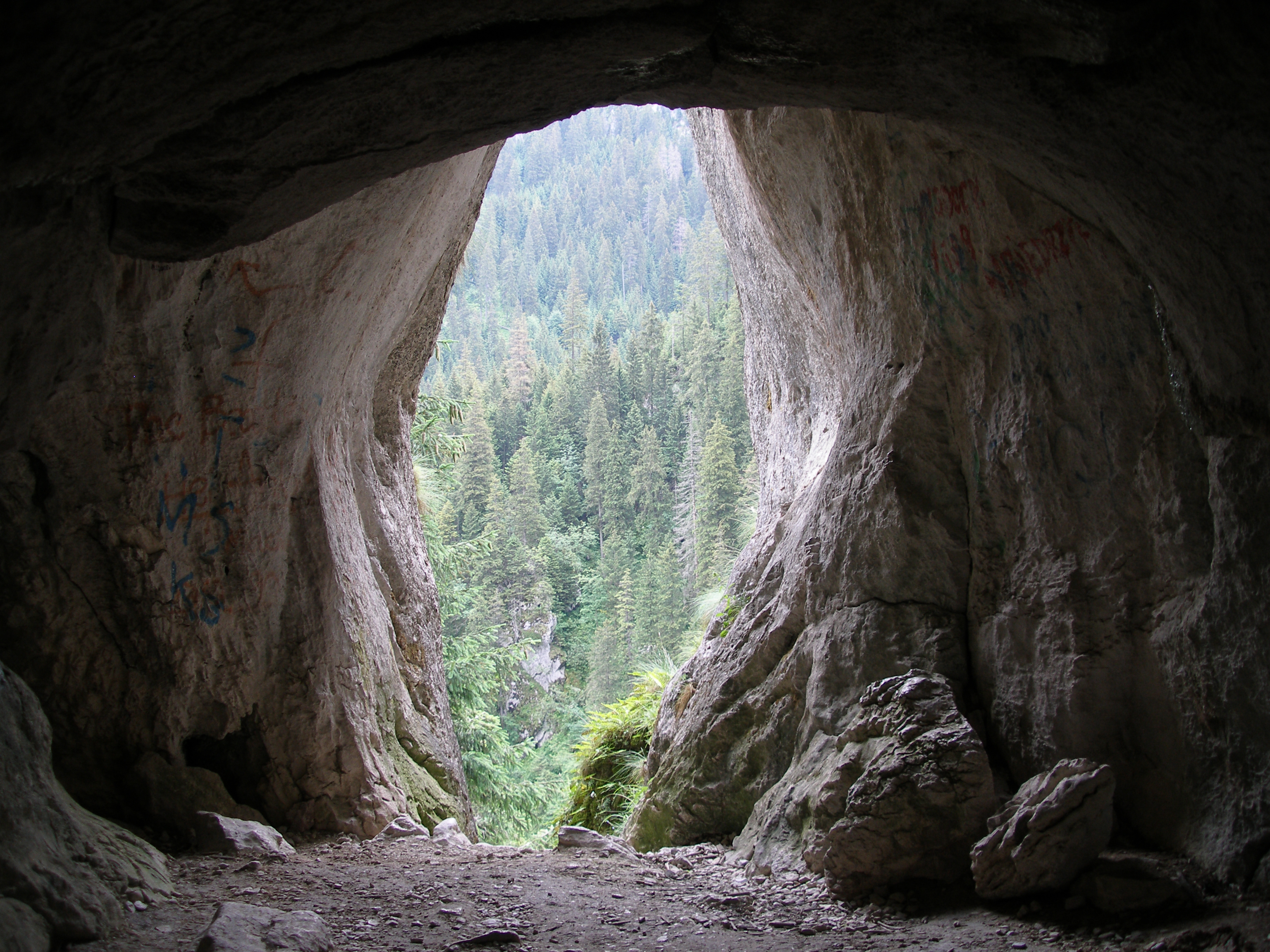
Pawlikowski's Window

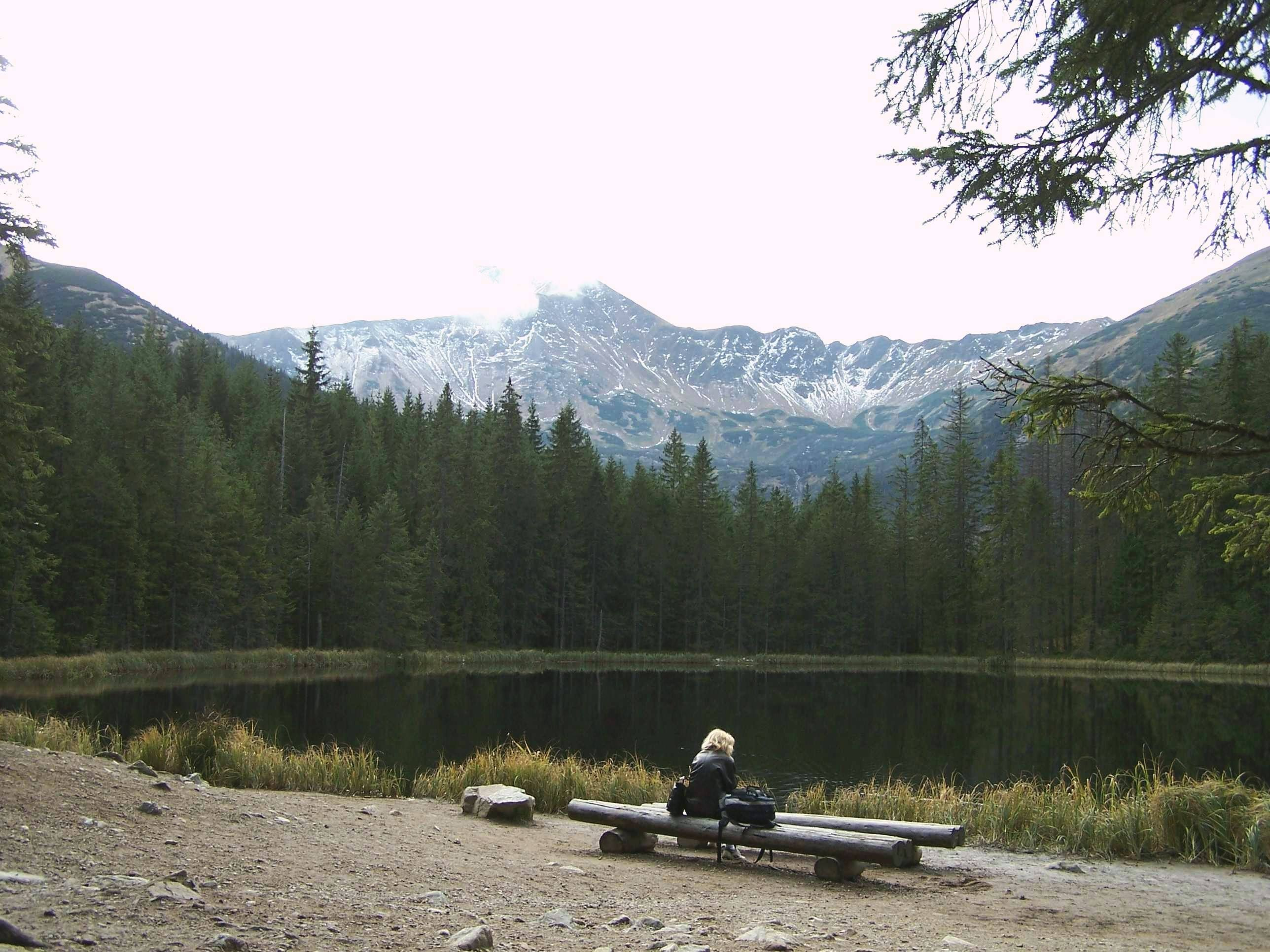
Smreczyński Lake
