= Piwniczka =

Cave in Tatra National Park, Poland

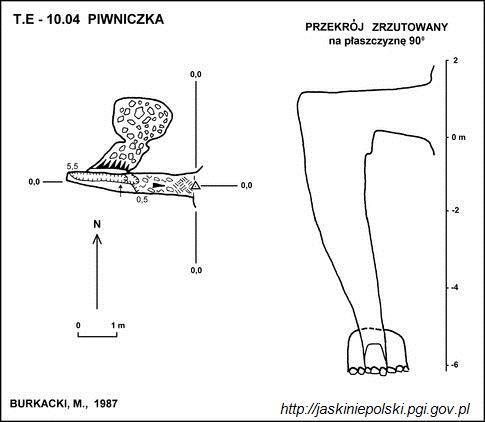

- Location within Lesser Poland Voivodeship Location within Poland
- Location: Tatra National Park, Poland
- Coordinates: 49°14′42″N 19°53′49″E
- Depth: 6 m
- Length: 9 m
- Elevation: 1440 m
- Discovery: 1987, Speleoklubu Warszawskiego PTTK

Piwniczka is a cave in Miętusie Turnie in the Miętusia Valley in the Western Tatras. It is located within Tatra National Park in Poland. The entrance to it is located on the north-west slope of Mała Świstówka, above the Miętusia Wyżnia Cave, at an altitude of 1,440 meters above sea level. The length of the cave is 9 meters and its height is 7 meters.

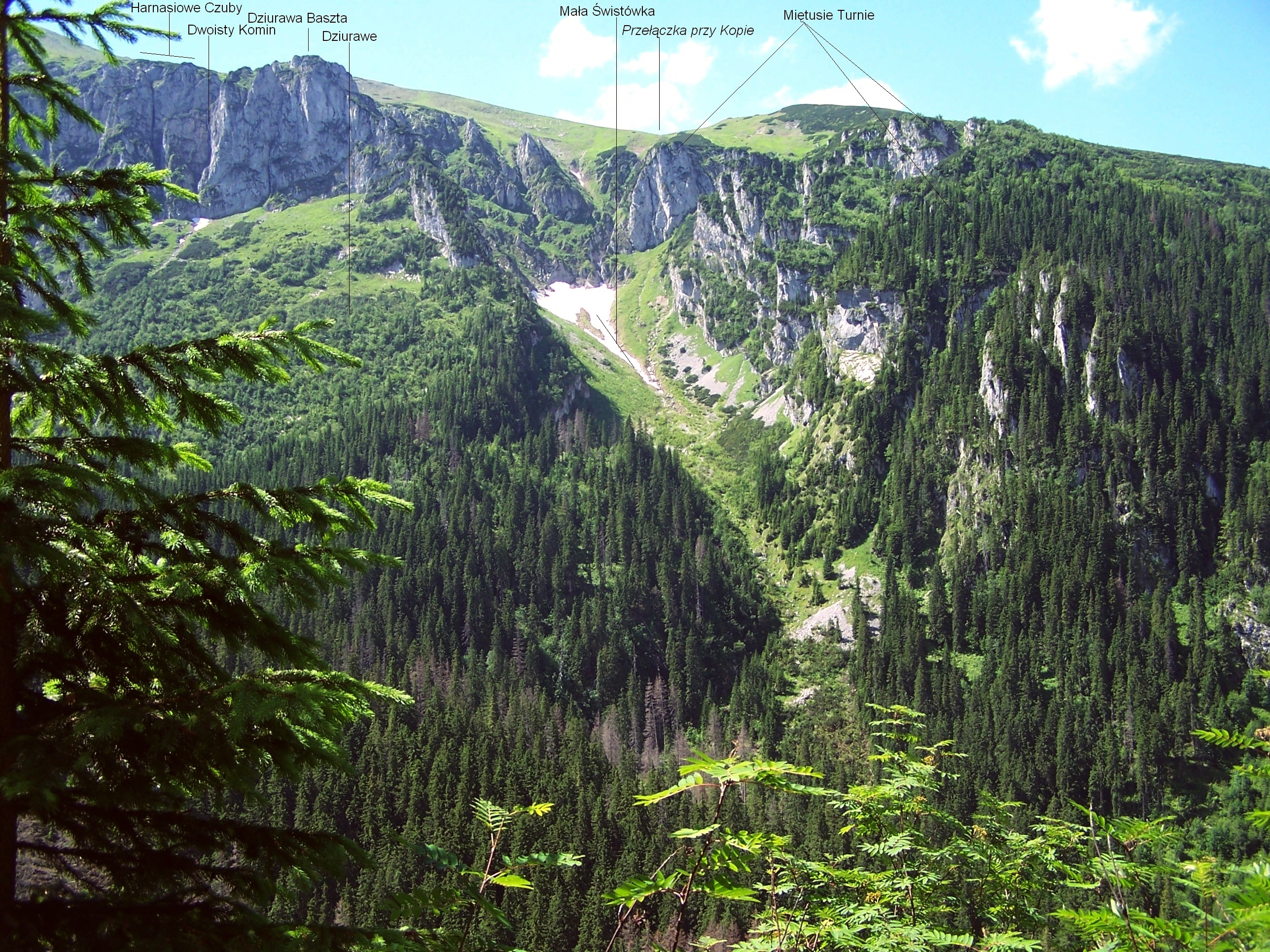
Little Swistówka. On the right, Miętus Turnie

== Description of the cave ==
The main part of the cave is a 6-meter well accessed by a 2-meter, almost horizontal corridor that starts with a small entrance opening. A vertical clamp on the right leads into a 6-meter well that widens at the bottom. There is then a small room with rubble at the bottom.

There are no speleothems in the cave. Near the opening, mosses and lichens grow on the damp walls.

== Discovery ==
The cave was discovered by members of the PTTK Warsaw Speleoklub [Spelunking Club] in 1987.
