= Kopa Kondracka =

Mountain between Poland and Slovakia

- Kondratova kopa
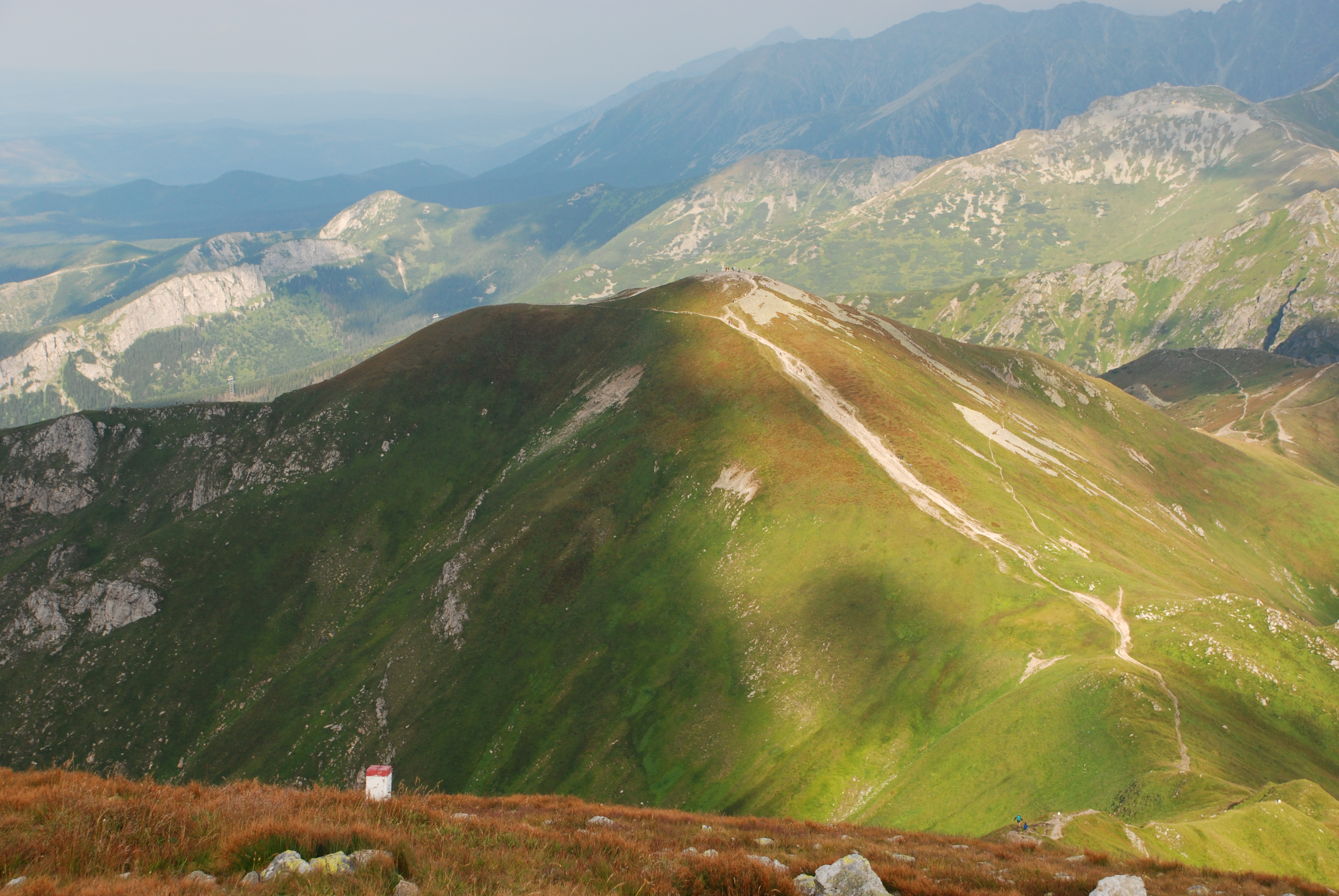
- Seen from Małołączniak

Highest point
- Elevation: 2,005 m (6,578 ft)
- Prominence: 80 m (260 ft)
- Coordinates: 49°14′12″N 19°55′56″E

Geography
- Countries: Poland and Slovakia
- Regions: Lesser Poland and Prešov
- Parent range: Western Tatras, Tatra Mountains

Kopa Kondracka (Slovak: Kondratova kopa) is a mountain in the Western Tatras mountain range, situated on the main ridge of the Tatras east of Małołączniak, on the border between Poland and Slovakia. It's the easternmost of the four summits making up the Czerwone Wierchy massif, as well as the lowest, with an elevation of 2005 meters. The three main valleys over which it rises are the Mała Łąka Valley, the Bystra Valley and the Tichá Valley.
