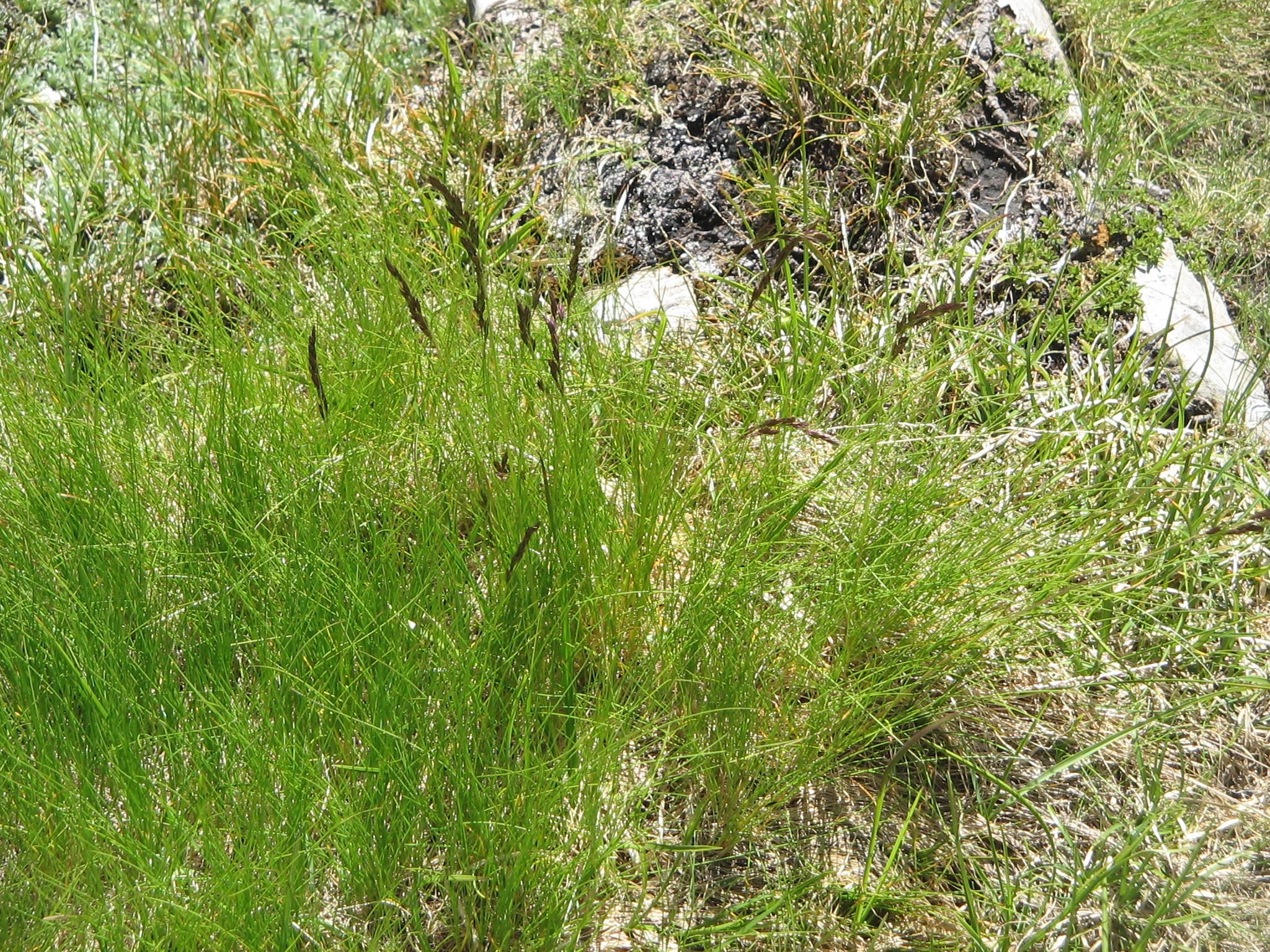

Scientific classification
- Kingdom: Plantae
- Clade: Tracheophytes
- Clade: Angiosperms
- Clade: Monocots
- Clade: Commelinids
- Order: Poales
- Family: Poaceae
- Subfamily: Pooideae
- Genus: Festuca
- Species: F. violacea

Binomial name
- Festuca violacea Ser. ex Gaudin

Synonyms
- Festuca ovina var. violacea (Ser. ex Gaudin) W.D.J.Koch; Festuca rubra subvar. schleicheri St.-Yves; Festuca rubra subsp. violacea (Ser. ex Gaudin) Hack.; Festuca rubra var. violacea (Ser. ex Gaudin) Hack.; Schedonorus violaceus (Ser. ex Gaudin) P.Beauv.

= Festuca violacea =

Species of grass

Festuca violacea is a species of grass in the family Poaceae. The species was first published in 1808. This species is native to Europe.

== Habitat ==
Festuca violacea is a perennial and mainly grows in temperate biomes.
