= Małołączniak =

Mountain in Slovakia and Poland

- Malolúčniak
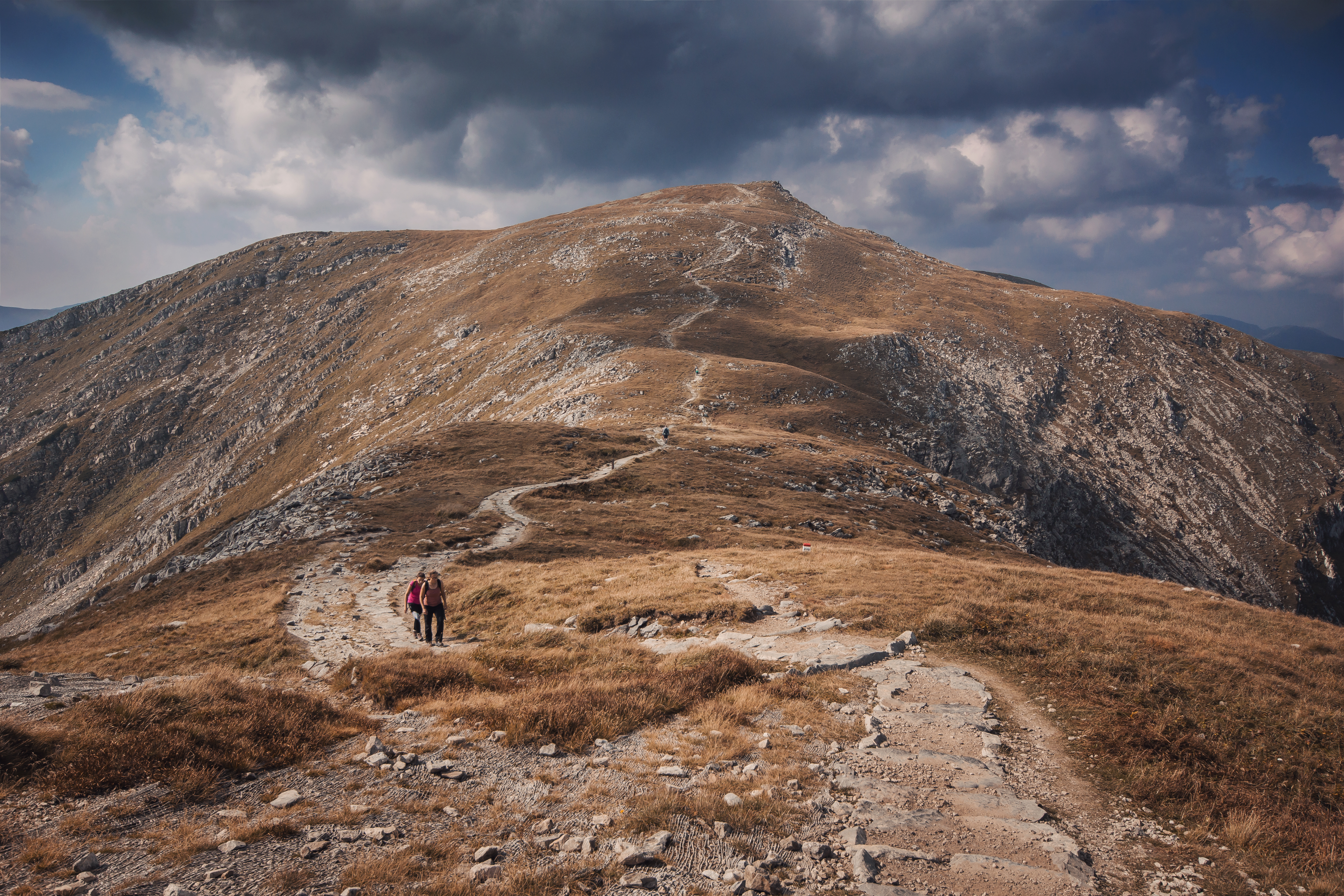
- Małołączniak's eastern side

Highest point
- Elevation: 2,096 m (6,877 ft)
- Prominence: 59 m (194 ft)
- Coordinates: 49°14′09″N 19°55′09″E

Geography
- Countries: Poland and Slovakia
- Regions: Lesser Poland and Prešov
- Parent range: Western Tatras, Tatra Mountains

Małołączniak (Slovak: Malolúčniak) is a mountain in the Western Tatras, with an elevation of 2096 m. It is part of the main ridge of the Tatras, located between Krzesanica and Kopa Kondracka on the border between Poland and Slovakia. It is one the four peaks making up the Czerwone Wierchy group of peaks.

Originally named Czerwony Wierch, it gave its name to the group of peaks it is a part of and to a ridge protruding to the northwest called Czerwony Grzbiet. The mountains's current name derives from the nearby former mountain pasture called Hala Mała Łąka. Jaskinia Wielka Śnieżna, the longest and deepest cave in Poland, is located in Małołączniak's massif.
