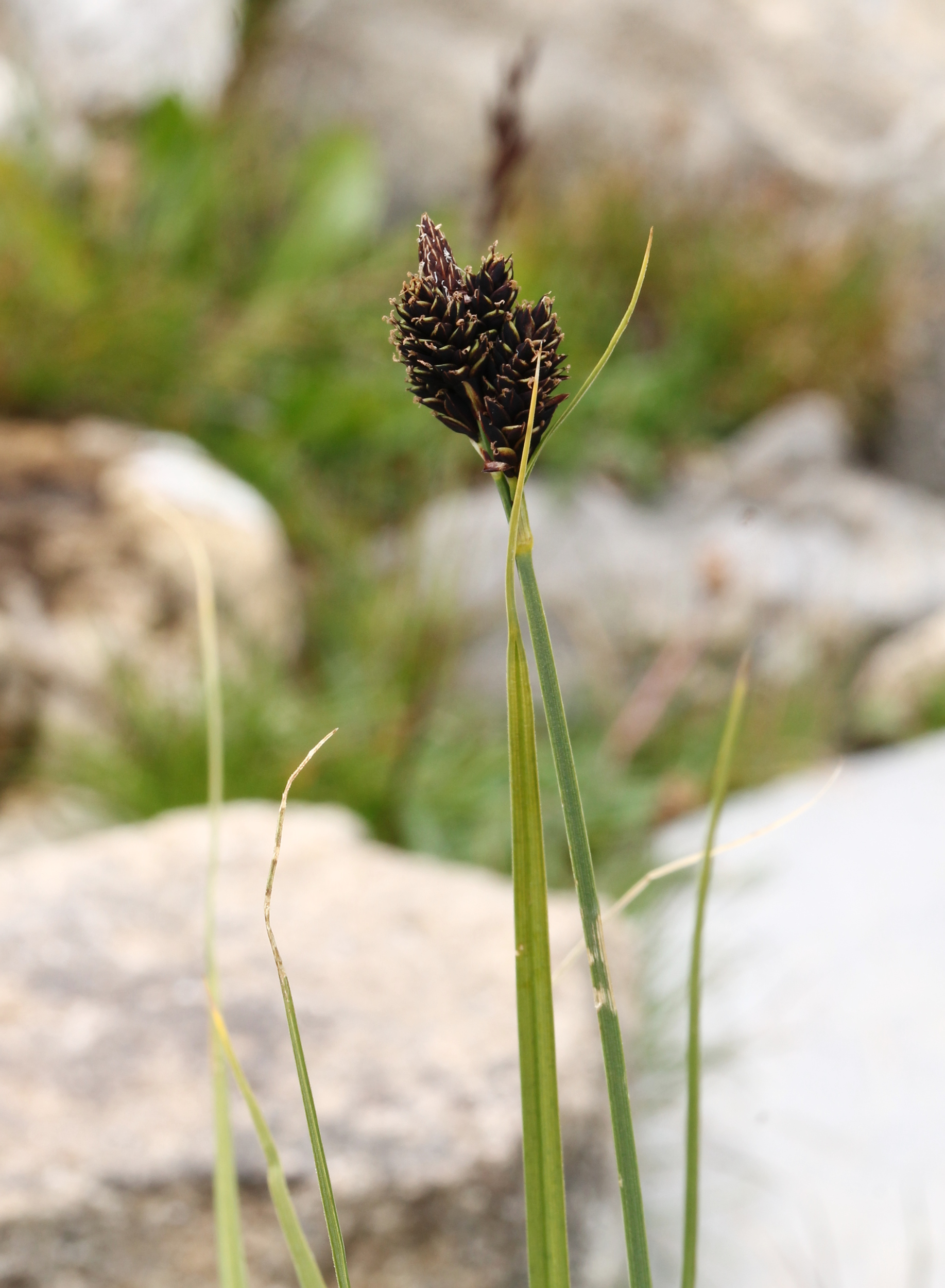
- Inflorescence

Scientific classification
- Kingdom: Plantae
- Clade: Tracheophytes
- Clade: Angiosperms
- Clade: Monocots
- Clade: Commelinids
- Order: Poales
- Family: Cyperaceae
- Genus: Carex
- Species: C. parviflora

Binomial name
- Carex parviflora Host

Synonyms
- List: Carex binata Poir.; Carex nigra All.; Carex pirinensis (Acht.) Acht.; Edritria parviflora (Host) Raf.

= Carex parviflora =

Species of flowering plant

Carex parviflora, called the small-flowered sedge, is a species of flowering plant in the genus Carex, native to central and southern Europe. Its chromosome number is 2n=54.
