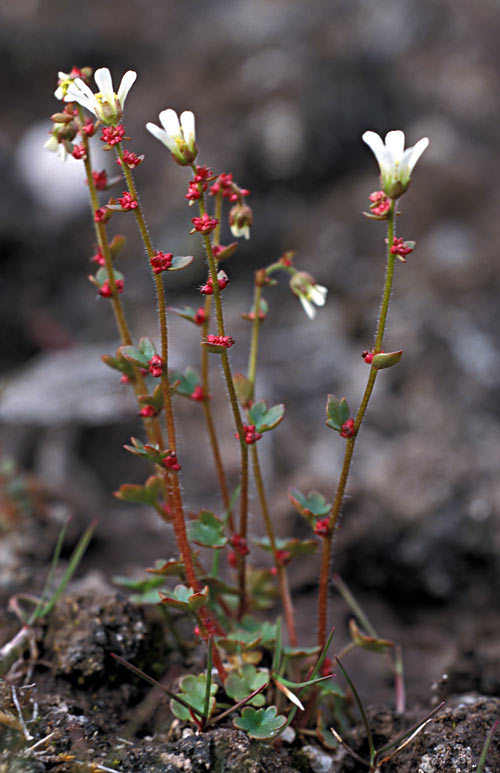

Scientific classification
- Kingdom: Plantae
- Clade: Tracheophytes
- Clade: Angiosperms
- Clade: Eudicots
- Order: Saxifragales
- Family: Saxifragaceae
- Genus: Saxifraga
- Species: S. cernua

Binomial name
- Saxifraga cernua L.

= Saxifraga cernua =

Species of flowering plant

Saxifraga cernua, the drooping saxifrage, nodding saxifrage or bulblet saxifrage, is a flower common all over the High Arctic. It stretches further south in mountainous areas of the Alps, Norway, Iceland, Siberia, Scotland and Alaska.

It grows to 10–20 cm tall and the stem has 3–7 leaves. The basal and lower stern leaves are kidney-shaped, 3–5 lobed on long petioles. The flowers are mostly single and terminal. Petals are white and are much longer than the sepals. The plant reproduces by means of brownish-red bulbils in the axils of the upper stem leaves. Flowers bloom June to August.

This plant grows in moist sandy and mossy places, on ledges and in snow beds.

It became a protected species in the UK in 1975 under the Conservation of Wild Creatures and Wild Plants Act.
