= Czerwone Wierchy =

Group of peaks in Western Tatras

- Červené vrchy Red Peaks
- Czerwone Wierchy

Highest point
- Peak: Krzesanica
- Elevation: 2,122 m (6,962 ft)
- Coordinates: 49°13′54″N 19°54′34″E

Dimensions
- Length: 2.215 km (1.376 mi)

Geography
- Countries: Poland and Slovakia
- Regions: Lesser Poland and Prešov
- Parent range: Western Tatras, Tatra Mountains

Czerwone Wierchy (Slovak: Červené vrchy, also known as Red Peaks) are a group of four grassy and domed peaks located on the main ridge of the Western Tatras on the border between Poland and Slovakia. Their name derives from the rush Juncus trifidus, in which the peaks are covered and whose blades turn red in autumn.

Czerwone Wierchy are made up of the following summits (west to east):

- Ciemniak / Temniak (2096 m)
- Krzesanica / Kresanica (2122 m)
- Małołączniak / Malolúčniak (2096 m)
- Kopa Kondracka / Kondratova kopa (2005 m)

They mostly consist of sedimentary rocks, such as limestone or dolomite, however their summits are covered in granite and other crystalline rocks.

The massif features numerous limestone caves, including the Jaskinia Wielka Śnieżna, the longest and deepest cave in Poland.

Litworowy Kocioł, located on the northern side of the Czerwone Wierchy, is Poland’s "pole of cold". On July 18, 2022, a temperature of –5.7 °C was recorded there, the lowest ever for that month. On February 17, 2025, a temperature of –41.13 °C was recorded, marking the lowest temperature in the history of meteorological measurements in Poland.
