= Allah Bachayo Khoso =

Alghoza player of Pakistan

Allah Bachayo Khoso الله بچايو کوسو (Sindhi)
- Born: 1935; Bulri Shah Karim Sindh
- Died: 2012 (aged 77); Bulri Shah Karim Sindh
- Occupation: Alghoza Artist
- Years active: 1935–2012
- Awards: Shah Abdul Latif Bhitai

Allah Bachayo Khoso (Sindhi: الله بچايو کوسو; 1935–2012) was a popular Sindhi folk artist and alghoza player.

== Early life ==
He was born in 1935 at village Dadun,, taluka Bulri Shah Karim, Tando Muhammad Khan District, Sindh, Pakistan.

== Career ==
He started playing alghoza at an early age and got popularity in 1976. He was a disciple of Misri Khan Jamali and Khamiso Khan. His items of playing alghoza were recorded from Radio Pakistan Hyderabad, Sindh. He performed with four alghozas at a time in his one performance in the Philippines in 2003. For the best performance he was awarded with Shah Abdul Latif Bhitai award. He was well aware of Sindhi classical music. He had played Alghoza with legendary singer Madam Noor Jehan during the 1965 Pakistan-India war in Lahore at the Wagha border. His recorded performance was part of Sindhi film Chandoki. He became a famous icon in the Sindhi folk music performance.

== Death ==
He died on 5 December 2012 and was buried at his hometown.
