= Bulri Shah Karim Tehsil =

Bulri Shah Karim Tehsil بلڙي شاھ ڪريم تعلقو بلڑی شاہ کریم تحصیل बुलड़ी शाह करीम तहसील
- Tehsil of Sindh
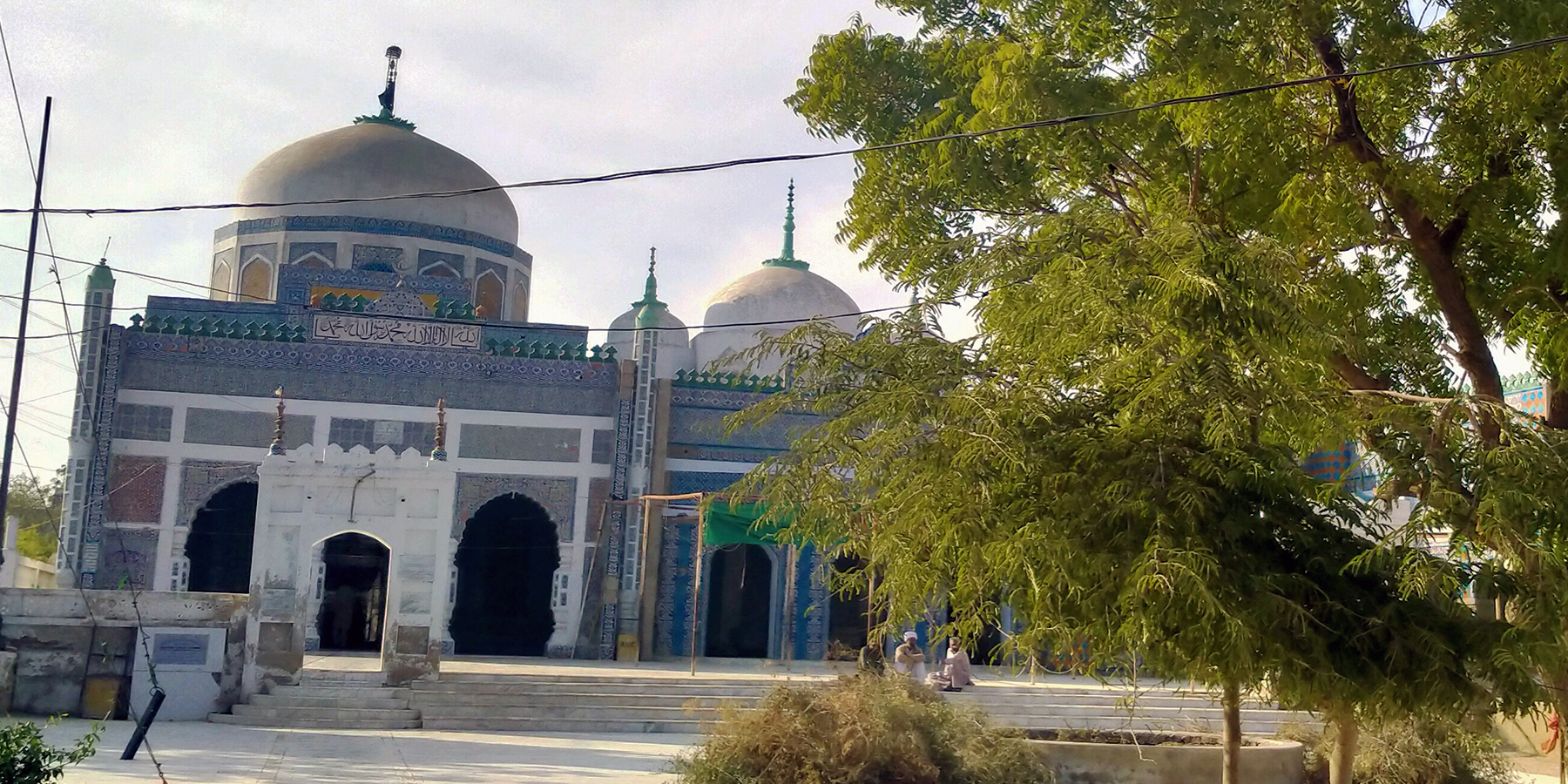
- Shrine of Shah Abdul Karim Bulri
- Nickname: Shah Karim
- Location in Sindh Location in Pakistan
- Coordinates: 24.86127840905121°N 68.33240771371034°E
- Country: Pakistan
- Province: Sindh
- Division: Hyderabad
- District: Tando Muhammad Khan District
- Tehsil: Bulri Shah Karim Tehsil
- Headquarters: Bulri Shah Karim

Government
  - Type: Tehsil Administration
  - Assistant commissioner: Azizullah Soomro
  - Mukhtiarkar: Riaz Ahmed Patoli
  - Municipal Officer: Zulfiqar Marfani

Area
  - Total: 770 km^{2} (300 sq mi)

Population (2017)
  - Total: 237,011
  - Density: 310/km^{2} (800/sq mi)
- Time zone: UTC+5 (PST)

Bulri Shah Karim Tehsil (Taluka) (Sindhi: بلڙي شاھ ڪريم تعلقو, Urdu: بلڑی شاہ کریم تحصیل, Hindi: बुलड़ी शाह करीम तहसील), also called Shah Karim, is an administrative subdivision located in the district Tando Muhammad Khan, within the Sindh province of Pakistan. Named after the Sufi saint Shah Abdul Karim Bulri, this tehsil has cultural and historical significance in the region.

== Administration ==
Bulri Shah Karim has a town committee, and it is the administrative centre of the tehsil. The town is renowned for hosting the annual Urs (festival) at the shrine of Shah Abdul Karim Bulri.

The tehsil comprises seven union councils, three circles, 17 tapas, 76 Dehs and 520 villages.

Union councils:

1. Allah Yar Turk
2. Bulri Shah Karim
3. Janhan Soomro
4. Mullakatiar
5. Saeed Khan Lund
6. Saeed Matto
7. Saeedpur

== Historical Places ==
Tehsil Bulri Shah Karim is home to several historical sites, including:

- The shrine of Shah Abdul Karim Bulri: He was an early Sindhi Sufi poet and the great-great-grandfather of the renowned Sindhi poet Shah Abdul Latif Bhittai.
- Dhandi Mosque: Named after the nearby Dhandi mound, this mosque is believed to have been constructed during the Mughal period.
- The shrine of Shaikh Lodhi Jiye Shah, near Syed Matto Shah

== Education ==
A burgeoning educational landscape exists in Bulri Shah Karim town and the tehsil, comprising public and private schools and colleges, including:

- Government Degree College, Bulri Shah Karim
- Government Boys High School, Bulri Shah Karim
- Government Girls High School, Bulri Shah Karim
- Government High School, Abdul Rahim Katiar, near Ditta Wah
- Government High School, Janhan Soomro
- Government High School, Mullakatiar
- Government High School, Saeed Khan Lund
- Government High School, Saidpur
- Government High School, Jhang Katiar
- Government Secondary School, Kapoor Mori
- Government Secondary School, Syed Matto Shah

The nearby district town of Tando Muhammad Khan is a hub of public and private educational institutions, including the University of Modern Sciences (the Indus Medical College and Hospital, and nursing, pharmacy, and physical therapy colleges); government degree colleges for boys and girls; a Shaheed Zulfikar Ali Bhutto Institute of Science and Technology (SZABIST) campus; Bahria Foundation College, and several high, middle and primary schools.

=== Language ===
Languages in Bulri Shah Karim tehsil (2017)
1. Sindhi (97.0%)
2. Punjabi (1.00%)
3. Brahui (1.00%)
4. Other (1.00%)

The predominant language spoken in Bulri Shah Karim tehsil is Sindhi. According to the 2017 census, several other languages are also commonly spoken within the tehsil. These include Punjabi, Brahui, Saraiki, Balochi, Urdu, Hindko and Pashto. Additionally, the Hazara tribe, descendants of the late General Moosa Khan, who reside in Bulri Shah Karim, speak Persian.

== Health ==
There's a network of public and private hospitals in the tehsil, including the Government of Sindh's taluka headquarter hospital in Bulri Shah Karim town, and basic health units at the union council level, which not only provide essential medical services but also operate as the Expanded Program on Immunization (EPI) centres.

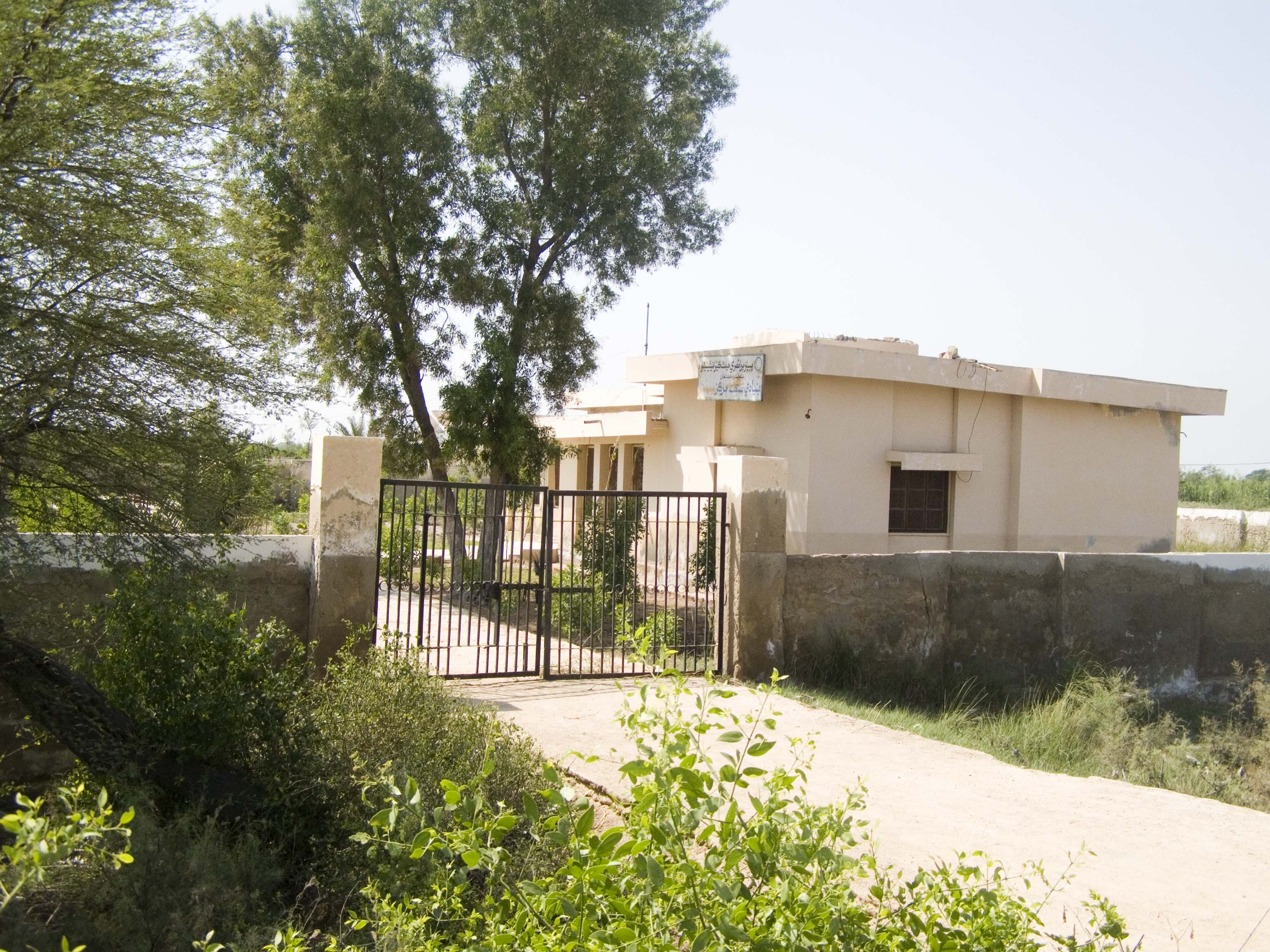
The Basic Health Unit (BHU) in the village Syed Matto Shah, union council Saeed Matto.

The district town of Tando Muhammad Khan boasts a comprehensive array of healthcare amenities, both public and private, including National Institute of Cardiovascular Diseases (NICVD), Indus Medical College and Hospital, District Headquarter Hospital (Civil Hospital), and Memon Hospital.

== Notable people ==
Notable people in the tehsil Bulri Shah Karim include Syed Naveed Qamar, a member of National Assembly from NA-221 Tando Muhammad Khan; Abdul Karim Soomro, former member of Sindh Assembly; Khurram Karim Soomro, a member of Sindh Assembly from PS-67 Tando Muhammad Khan-II; Syed Asad Shah Kazmi, the custodian of the Bulri Shah Karim Sherine; Ibrahim Munshi, a Sindhi poet; Dr Qalandar Shah Lakyari, an educationist; Dr Ibrahim Sindhi, a scholar; Nabi Bux Sathio, Vice President, Sindh Chamber of Agriculture; Rajab Sathio, an assistant commissioner in the Government of Sindh; and R. B. Sarang, an author and communicator.

== See also ==
- Tando Muhammad Khan District
- Thatta District
