= Khamiso Khan =

Pakistani folk artist, alghoza player (1923–1983)

- خميسو خان
- Born: 1923; Tando Muhammad Khan, Sindh, British India
- Died: 8 March 1983 (aged 59–60); Hyderabad, Sindh, Pakistan
- Occupation: Instrumental musician (alghoza player)
- Children: Akbar Khamiso Khan
- Awards: Pride of Performance Award by the President of Pakistan (1979)

Khamiso Khan (Sindhi: خميسو خان; 1923–1983) was a Sindhi folk musician and alghoza player from Sindh, Pakistan.

== Personal life ==
Khamiso Khan was born in 1923 in Tando Muhammad Khan city, of Tando Muhammad Khan District, Sindh, Pakistan. His son Akbar Khamiso Khan is also a notable alghoza player.

== Career ==
Khamiso Khan was a contemporary of another notable alghoza player Misri Khan Jamali. He mainly played typical Sindhi folk and classical music on alghoza.

He was associated with Radio Pakistan, Hyderabad Station as a folk artist for 18 years. Khamiso Khan performed at events when touring Europe and the United States. When Khamiso died of a heart attack, then president Zia-ul-Haq called his death a great loss for folk music in Pakistan.

== Awards and recognition ==
- Pride of Performance Award by the President of Pakistan in 1979.

== Death ==
Khamiso Khan died after a heart attack on 8 March 1983 at Hyderabad, Pakistan.
