= Chaudhro =

Pakistani village

Chaudhro Chāudhro, Goth Chaudhrio
- Village
- Location in Sindh Chaudhro (Pakistan)
- Coordinates: 25.081108°N 68.447367°E
- Country: Pakistan
- Region: Sindh
- District: Tando Muhammad Khan

Population (2017)
  - Total: 5,111
- Time zone: UTC+5 (PST)
  - Summer (DST): UTC+6 (PDT)

Chaudhro, aka Goth Chaudhrio, is a village and deh in Bulri Shah Karim taluka of Tando Muhammad Khan District, Sindh. As of 2017, it has a population of 5,111, in 985 households. It is the seat of a tapedar circle, which also includes the villages of Bilal, Doulatpur, Narki, and Sitar.
