= Baqar Nizamani =

Village in Sindh, Pakistan

Baqar Nizamani is a village located at 25.171699,68.582754 in Tando Muhammad Khan District, Sindh, Pakistan.

The village was founded by Baqar Khan Nizamani. The population is about 4,000+. The town is situated in the territory of NA-222 and PP-53. Mostly youths like political party Pakistan Tehreek-e-Insaf and Pakistan Peoples Party.

People of Baqar Nizamani mostly play cricket and football.

== Education ==
There are 3 schools in Baqar Nizaman Dived into 3 parts Government Primary School Wahidabad, Government Boys High School and Government Girl High School.

== About ==
There is oil and gas field in Baqar Nizamani called the Tangri oil and gas field. There is a PTCL exchange with broadband facility, a government hospital and a 3 floor building, and a water filtration plant.

== Politics ==
Politically Baqar Nizamani is divided into two main political parties, Pakistan Peoples Party (PPP) and Pakistan Tehreek-e-Insaf (PTI).

PPP came there by the time of Zulfikar Ali Bhutto (the former of PPP). PTI was introduced by the efforts. PTI has emerged as a second big party in Baqar Nizamani and has grown rapidly.

Among two parties, PPP and PTI are running their own welfare organizations and work to help people to resolve their problems without having power in the government. PTI mainly runs SYWA NGO to provide guideline and career counseling to the new students entering the universities and mainly works to help poor people in terms of health, food supply, financial help, flood relief.

PPP has always ruled being in government. Due to lack of interest to resolve the village issues and less participation in the infrastructure development of town, this party losing its popularity and facing a big resistance caused by PTI.
