= Akbar Khamiso Khan =

Performer

Akbar Khamiso Khan (Sindhi: اڪبر خميسو خان) is an alghoza player from the Sindh province of Pakistan.

== Early life ==
Khan was born on February 02 1976 in Hyderabad to renowned alghoza player Khamiso Khan.

== Career ==
Khan has performed both domestically and internationally. One of his most notable performances was at the Golden Jubilee Celebrations of OIC in Saudi Arabia, in November 2019. He plays tunes from all the provinces of Pakistan.

== Awards ==
Khan was awarded the Tamgha-e-Imtiaz (lit: "medal of excellence") by the Government of Pakistan in 2010.
