= Saidpur, Tando Muhammad Khan =

Pakistani village

Saidpur Goth Saidpur
- Village
- Location in Sindh Saidpur (Pakistan)
- Coordinates: 25.13202°N 68.45464°E
- Country: Pakistan
- Region: Sindh
- District: Tando Muhammad Khan

Population (2017)
  - Total: 1,994
- Time zone: UTC+5 (PST)
  - Summer (DST): UTC+6 (PDT)

Saidpur, aka Goth Saidpur, is a village and deh in Bulri Shah Karim taluka of Tando Muhammad Khan District, Sindh. As of 2017, it has a population of 1,994, in 365 households. It is the seat of a tapedar circle, which also includes the villages of Beharn, Deghi, Dodi, Jamarkri, and Pakhro. It is also the headquarters of a supervisory tapedar circle, which also includes the tapedar circles of Alipur, Barchani, Miranpur, and Mulan Katiar.
