= Mir Allah Bux Talpur =

Sindhi politician

Mir Khan Bahadur Honorable Mir Allah Bux Shahwani Talpur
- مير الله بخش شاهواڻي ٽالپر
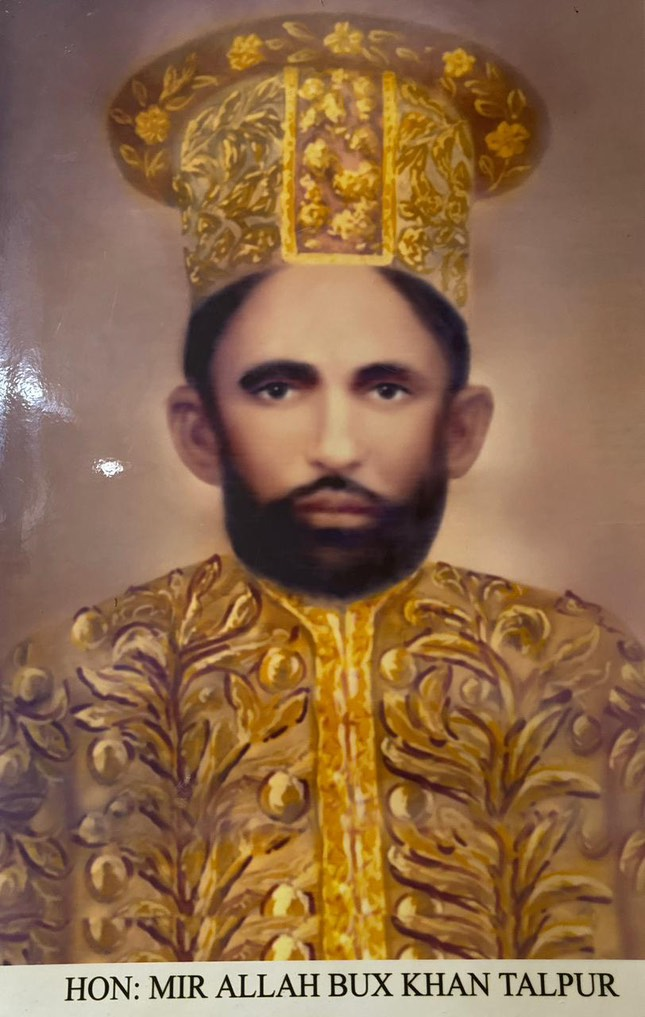
- Portrait of Mir Allah Bux Khan Talpur

Personal details
- Born: 16 May 1863 Tando Muhammad Khan, Hyderabad District, Bombay Presidency, British Raj
- Died: 8 August 1911 (aged 48) Tando Muhammad Khan, Hyderabad District, Bombay Presidency, British Raj
- Resting place: Tando Muhammad Khan, Hyderabad District, Bombay Presidency, British Raj
- Parent: Mir Ali Bux Shahwani Talpur (father)
- Education: Rajkumar College
- Profession: Zamindar; Politician; Jagirdar; Magistrate

Khan Bahadur Mir Allah Bux Khan Shahwani Talpur (16 May 1863 – 8 August 1911) was a prominent Sindhi nobleman, jagirdar, politician, and social reformer in British India. He served as a special first-class magistrate and held long-standing positions in both the Bombay and in the Imperial Legislative Council.

== Early life and education ==
Mir Allah Bux Khan Shahwani Talpur was born on 16 May 1863 in Tando Muhammad Khan, Sindh, into the influential Talpur family. His grandfather, Mir Shaho Khan, was the maternal uncle of Mir Fateh Ali Khan Talpur, the founder of Talpur rule in Sindh.

He was privately educated at home, later attending Government High School in Hyderabad and Rajkumar College in Gujarat, a college for the sons of Indian princes and nobles. He was fluent in English, Urdu, Sindhi, and Persian.

== Political and Judicial Career ==
In 1889, Mir Allah Bux was appointed special first-class magistrate, but he declined financial support for his court and office from the government.

He entered politics in 1895 when he was elected as a member of the Bombay Legislative Council, and was re-elected five times due to his popularity and effective leadership.

In 1909, he was elected to the Imperial Legislative Council, representing the Sindhi Jagirdars and Zamindars. At the time, he was one of the largest landowners in Sindh, with nearly 92,000 acres under his name.

== Educational and Social Work ==
Talpur was deeply committed to advancing education. As President of the Sindh Mohammedan Association, he actively promoted modern education among Muslims in the region. In 1908, he further demonstrated his leadership by presiding over the Reception Committee of the All-India Muhammadan Educational Conference held in Karachi.

== Legacy and Personality ==
Known for his broad-mindedness and tolerance, Talpur was praised for his freedom from religious and sectarian bigotry. According to The Sindh Journal, he was described as:

"Gentle, unassuming, amiable, peace-loving, kind even to the envious, dignified in learning... deservedly and highly esteemed by all Hindus, Moslems, and Europeans who knew him."

His motto was said to be "unaggressiveness," highlighting his commitment to communication, diplomacy, and social harmony.

== Death ==
Mir Allah Bux Khan Shahwani Talpur died on 8 August 1911 at Tando Muhammad Khan. His contributions to Sindh's legislative and educational progress remain a significant part of the region's history.
