= Taga Ram Bheel =

Taga Ram Bheel is an Indian folk musician from Rajasthan known for playing the algoza, a traditional double-flute instrument. He has performed at folk music festivals in India and abroad. In 2026, he was named a recipient of the Padma Shri in the field of art.

== Early life ==
Bheel is from Moolsagar village in the Jaisalmer district of Rajasthan. He learned to play the algoza during childhood, initially practising with his father's instrument. He later bought an algoza of his own and continued learning through practice.

== Career ==
Bheel performed at Gopa Chowk in Jaisalmer during the Independence Day celebrations in 1981. Following the performance, he received training from Akbar Khan of the Ustad Arba Music Institute in Jaisalmer. He subsequently performed at folk music events in Rajasthan, including the Desert Festival in Jaisalmer, the Pushkar Fair and the Marwar Festival in Jodhpur. He also received a scholarship from the Centre for Cultural Resources and Training in New Delhi. In 1996, Bheel travelled to France to perform. He later performed in other countries, including Spain, Italy, Germany, Japan, Singapore and the United States. His international appearances included performances with the Musafir Group and the Ustad Arba Music Group.

Apart from performing, Bheel makes algoza instruments and teaches their use. He established the Algoza Folk Music Institute in Moolsagar to provide instruction in playing the instrument.

== Recognition ==
In 2026, Bheel was awarded the Padma Shri in the field of art his work in Rajasthani folk music.
