= Nango Shah =

Nango Shah Nāngo Shāh, Nānga Shāh, Goth Nago Shah
- Village
- Location in Sindh Nango Shah (Pakistan)
- Coordinates: 25.005604°N 68.57203°E
- Country: Pakistan
- Region: Sindh
- District: Tando Muhammad Khan

Population (2017)
  - Total: 14,956
- Time zone: UTC+5 (PST)
  - Summer (DST): UTC+6 (PDT)

Nango Shah, a.k.a. Nanga Shah or Goth Nago Shah, is a village and one of 29 dehs in Tando Muhammad Khan taluka of Tando Muhammad Khan District, Sindh. As of 2017, it has a population of 14,956, in 2,672 households. It part of the tapedar circle of Lakhat.
