= Shaikh Bhirkio =

Pakistani village

- Village
- Location in Sindh Shaikh Bhirkio (Pakistan)
- Coordinates: 25.26006°N 68.660352°E
- Country: Pakistan
- Region: Sindh
- District: Tando Muhammad Khan

Population (2017)
  - Total: 7,539
- Time zone: UTC+5 (PST)
  - Summer (DST): UTC+6 (PDT)

Shaikh Bhirkio is a village and deh in Tando Muhammad Khan taluka of Tando Muhammad Khan District, Sindh. It is one of the 17 union councils of the district. As of 2017, Shaikh Bhirkio has a population of 7,539, in 1,593 households. It is the seat of a tapedar circle, which also includes the villages of Burera, Chando Katiar, and Samabani.
