= Abdur Rauf Seemab =

Pakistani potter and politician (1922 - 2010)

Abul Rauf Seemab (1922 - 30 october 2010) was a Pakistani potter and politician credited with preservation of traditional Peshawari pottery culture. He was born in Peshawar to an Iranian family and entered politics in the 1940s as part of the All India Muslim League. For his works he was presented with Tamghae-Imtiaz. He died in 2009 of pulmonary illness.

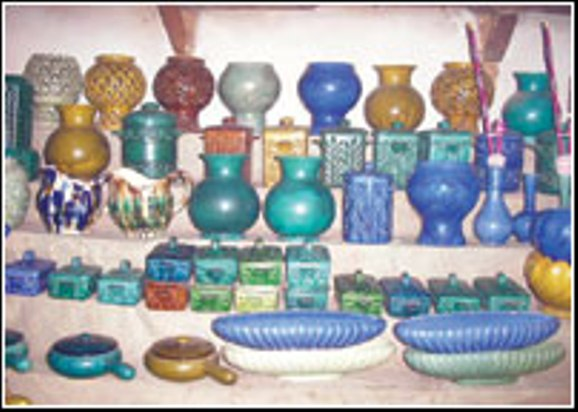
A collection of glazed pottery, including vases, bowls, and containers, made by Seemab's workshop

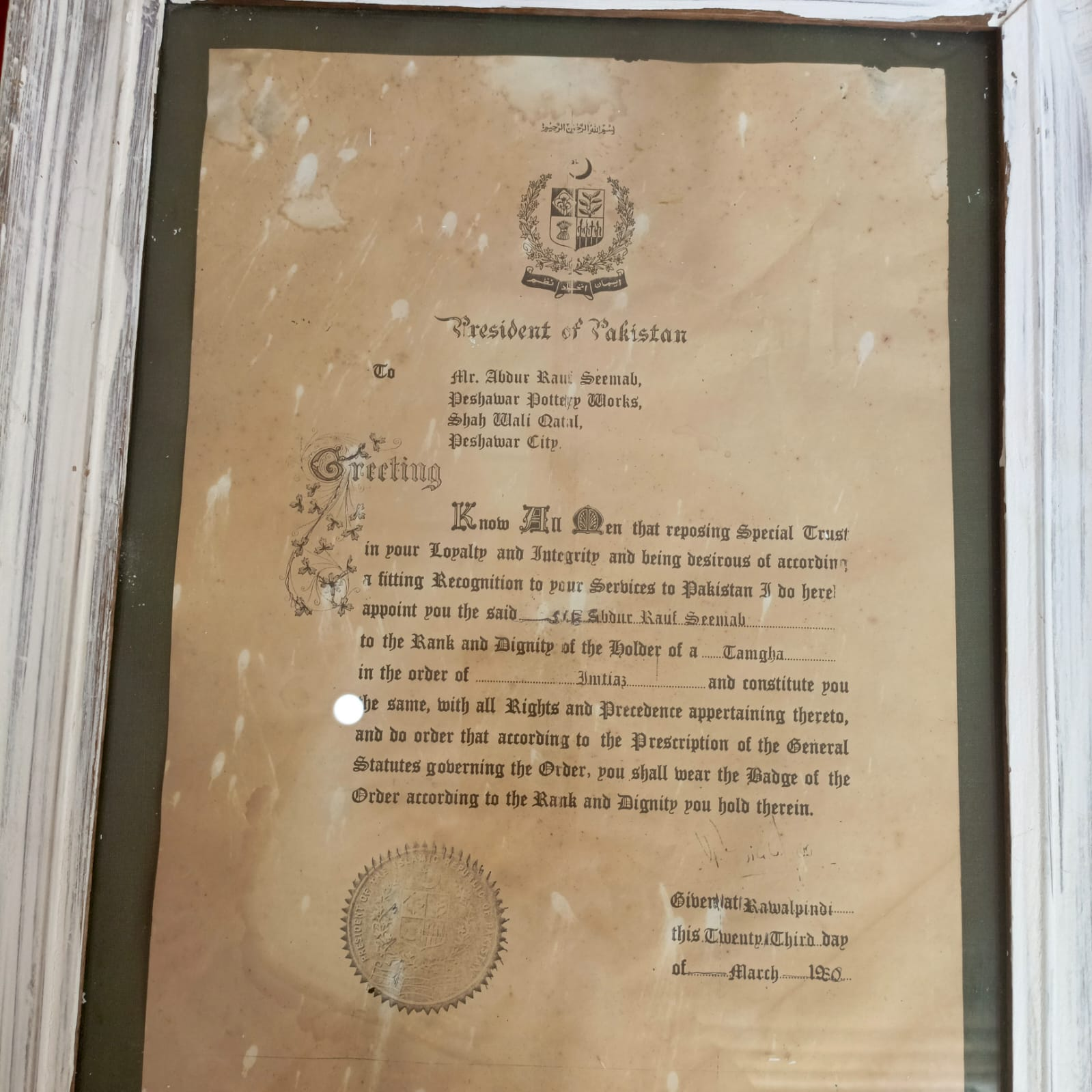
A photo of a letter presented by the then president of Pakistan General Ayub Khan presenting Tamghae-Imtiaz to Abdul Rauf Seemab on March 23, 1960

== Early life ==
Abdul Rauf Seemab was born in 1922 in Peshawar, into a family of Iranian heritage, his ancestors having migrated to the region in the 1860s. His family was known for pottery and he learnt the skill from his father, eventually becoming one of the most renowned pottery craftsmen in Pakistan.

Seemab attended Edwards College, Peshawar in the 1940s becoming interested in arts, culture, and politics and became an active member of the All-India Muslim League.

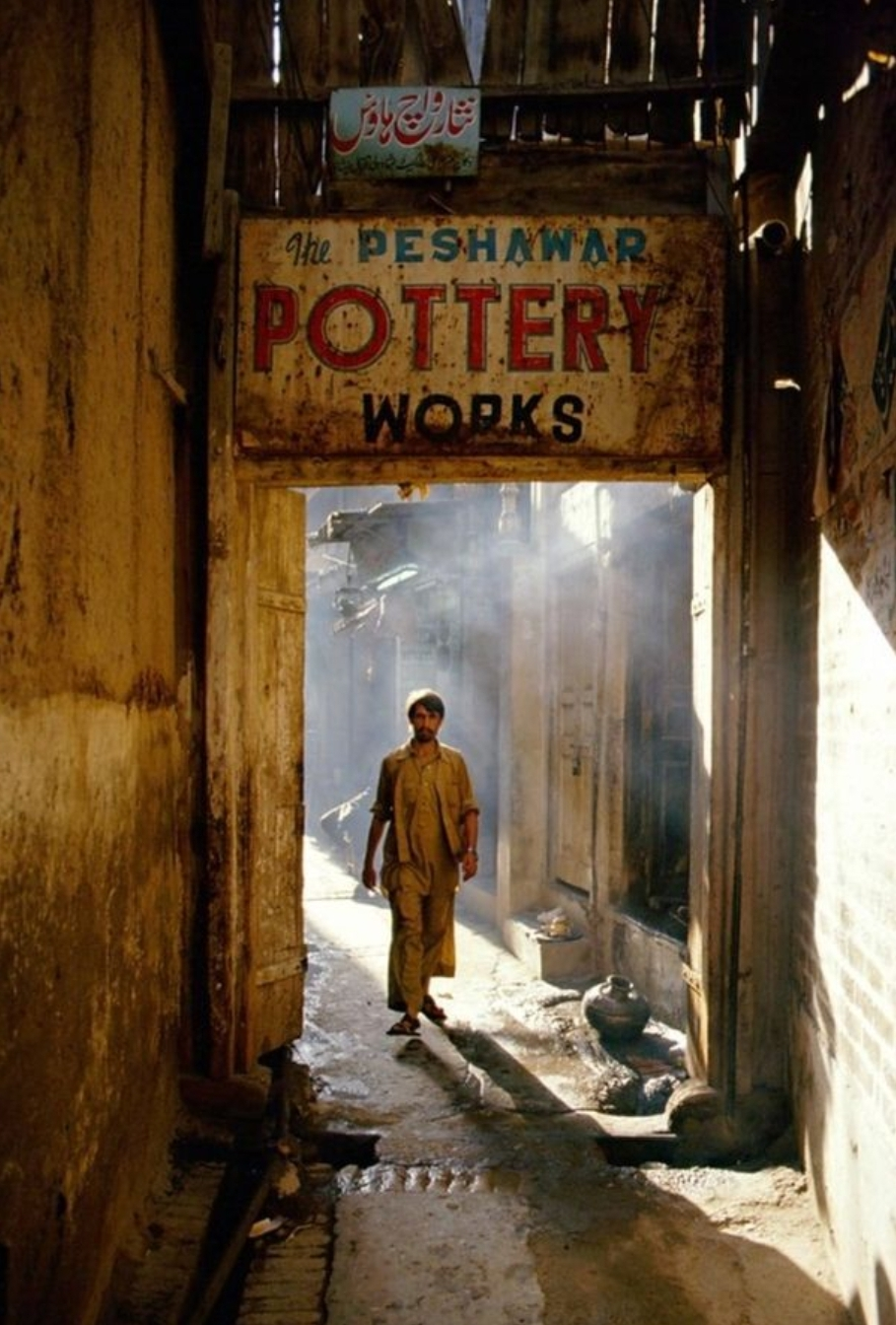
A photo of one of Seemab's warehouses at Qissa Khwani Bazaar, Peshawar, taken around 1988

== Political and Artistic career ==
Seemab became a master potter, with some of his pieces going as high as 50,000 PKR but many remained unsold because he refused to sell his most prized artifacts in a bid to preserve cultural heritage being awarded Tamgha-e-Imtiaz, one of the highest Pakistanis civil award, for his contributions in pottery.

He was also credited with saving President Ayub Khan during an assassination attempt in Peshawar in November 1968.

== Death and legacy ==
He suffered from lung complications, and died on October 30, 2010, at the age of 88.

He had directly influenced many artisans and artists in Pakistan leaving an "indelible mark on Pakistan's cultural and artistic landscape". Following his death, his business was shut down and a plaza was made over it.
