= Dando =

- Location within Pakistan
- Coordinates: 24°58′25″N 68°45′49″E
- Country: Pakistan
- Province: Sindh
- District: Tando Muhammad Khan
- Taluka: Tando Ghulam Hyder

Population (2017)
  - Total: 3,943
- Time zone: UTC+5 (PST)

Dando is a town in Tando Muhammad Khan District, Sindh province, Pakistan.

== Geography ==
=== Location ===
Dando is around 14 km from Matli city and 66 km from the major city of Hyderabad. It is amidst canals fed by the River Indus.

=== Climate ===
The village experiences a temperate climate as is found in other areas of lower Sindh.

== Demography ==
The town has a population of around 4,543. Mostly people living here are Muslims with a significant Hindu minority. Ethnic communities including Khatti, Memon, Pathan, Punjabi and others live here in harmony. The languages spoken include, Urdu, Sindhi, Seraiki, and Gujrati.

== Administration ==
Dando consists of one union council. A single UC consists of 4 Dehs. Wards of Ringyoon, and Sajan Sawahi are part of UC-26 Dando.

== Landmarks and Points of Interest ==
Dando has some notable landmarks which represent its cultural and historical significance: 1. Historical mosque of BiBi Lal masjid. 2. Tomb of Sajan sawahi beside Dando is one of the most visited and venerated shrine in area. 3. It has one of the oldest railway station: Pal station.

== Economy ==
Infrastructure and facilities provided do not support large scale commercial activities or industrial establishments in the area and economy is mostly rural with agriculture being dominant source of income followed by making of traditional handicrafts. Cotton, rice paddy, tomato and sugarcane are key crops of Dando. Gooni (new phuleli) provides water for irrigation and household use, hence is vital for the people of the area.

== Infrastructure and Amenities ==
The area lacks in basic facilities and amenities to support a vibrant population. People mostly rely on Government facilities for education and healthcare. Schools, colleges and medical facilities are inadequate to cater villagers needs and hence they have to travel to nearby towns and cities for basic amenities. Transportation is also not adequate making communication and travel difficult for residents.
