= Ibrahim Munshi =

Sindhi poet and writer

- ابراهيم منشي
- Born: Mohammad Ibrahim Soomro; 15 January 1934; Tando Muhammad Khan, Hyderabad, Sindh, British India
- Died: 31 July 2003 (aged 69)
- Occupation: Poet
- Writing career
- Pen name: "منشي"
- Genre: Aesthetic
- Subject: Poetry
- Notable work: Poetry Books (07)
- Literary movement: Progressive

Mohammad Ibrahim Soomro by his pen name Ibrahim Munshi Sindhi: محمد ابراهيم منشي) was a Sindhi-language poet and writer. He was born on January 15, 1934, in Janhan Soomro جنھاڻ سومرو, Tando Muhammad Khan, Hyderabad District, Sindh. He wrote seven books of poetry. He died on 31 July 2003.

== Education ==
When Munshi was 9 years old, at the time of his primary education, his father died. All of his family’s responsibilities fell upon him as he was teenager.

He gained primary education in his village. Due to this responsibility he stopped education at primary level, could not proceed for higher education and left his study and toiled hard for earning.

== Literary career ==
Ibrahim Munshi's father was a patriotic poet therefore Ibrahim got the poetry in legacy. He was greatly affected by difficult circumstances of his time also and started poetry in 1949. He under the supervision of his father's teacher Ustad Ali Muhammad "Sepoy", started poetry at the age of thirteen. He tested himself in every field of poetry. He described working people in his poetry. He was greatly impresses by revolutionary poetry of Shaikh Ayaz in 1960. His poetry published in monthly magazine "Rooh Rehan" during 1965-1966.

== Publications ==
- Paigham Mazloom (Sindhi: پيغام مظلوم) in 1970
- Wigh ja Waryam appeared in 1971 * Gondar Wenda Guzri (Sindhi: گوندر ويندا گذري) in 1985
- Dharti, Deen, Dharam (Sindhi: ڌرتي دين ڌرم) in 1991
- Dhuanre dehan dhara (Sindhi: ڌنري ڏين ڌارا) in 1995
- "Akhar Akhar Akh" (Sindhi: اکر اکر اک) in 2006 by Roshni publication.

== Death ==
Ibrahim Munshi died on 31 July 2003.
