= Abdul Rauf Rufi =

Pakistani performer of Islamic music

- عبد الرؤف روفی
- Born: Faisalabad, Punjab, Pakistan
- Occupations: Naat Khawan (Naat reciter), poet
- Awards: Pride of Performance Award by the President of Pakistan in 2005

Abdul Rauf Rufi (Urdu: عبد الرؤف روفی) is a reciter of Naats from Pakistan.

== Career ==
Rufi likes to use a lot of musical instruments including the Arab percussion drums and traditional Pakistani tabla, dholak and Dafli (Daf) when reciting Naats.

== Released albums ==
Some of his albums are:

- Kaabay Ki Ronaq, Kaabay Ka Manzar (2023)
- Khuda Ki Azmatain (2021)
- Vaseela e Rehmat (2004)
- Darbar e Rehmat (2004)
- Ashk-e-Rehmat, Vol. 9 (2005)
- Tosif-E-Nalain-E-Muhammad (2005)
- Darbar-E-Rehmat (2007)
- Zikr-E-Rehmat (2007)
- Al Madina Chal Madina (2009)
- Patti Patti Phool Phool (2009)
- Ausaaf-e-Hameeda (2010)
- Maan Baap (2010)
- Hube Khairat (2011)
- Tan Sadaqe Mera Maan Sadaqe (2011)
- Ameen (2011)
- Hum Tou Gulab Hogaye (2012)
- Allah Hoo (2015)
- Rukh-e-Mustafa (2017)

== Super-hit Naats ==
- Shah-e-Madina
- Lam Yaati Nazeero
- Meetha Meetha Hai Meray Muhammad Ka Naam
- Woh Suay Lalazaar Phirte Hain
- Agar Koi Apna Bhala Chahta Hai
- Rukh-e-Mustafa Ka Jamal Allah Allah
- Al Madina Chal Madina, Aaj Nahin Tau Kal Madina
- Rab Ka Pyara Aaya Hai
- Mein Madinay Ho Anwaan
- Allah Karam (2023)
- Balaghal Ula Be Kamalehi (2024)

== Awards ==
- Pride of Performance Award in 2005 by the Government of Pakistan.
