= Naʽat =

Poetry in praise of the Islamic Prophet Muhammad

Naʽat (Bengali: নাত and Urdu: نعت) is poetry in praise of the Islamic prophet, Muhammad. The practice is popular in South Asia (Bangladesh, Pakistan and India), commonly in Bengali, Punjabi, or Urdu. People who recite Naʽat are known as Naʽat Khawan or sanaʽa-khuaʽan. Exclusive "Praise to Allah" and Allah alone is called Hamd, not to be confused with 'Na'at'.

In Arab countries, lyrics and praises said for Muhammad are called madih nabawi.

== History ==
=== Early Islam ===
One early author, Hassan, was known as Shair-e Darbaar-e Risalat. Before converting to Islam he was a poet, and after converting he started writing Na'ats in honor of Muhammad. His poetry defended Muhammad in response to rival poets who attacked him and his religion.

Talaʽ al Badru ʽAlayna is a traditional Islamic poem known as nasheed recited to Muhammad when he moved to Medina in 622 CE.

=== British India ===
The tradition of composing naʿat poetry in Urdu has deep historical roots and is nearly as old as Urdu poetry itself. Since praising the Prophet Muhammad has long been regarded as a devotional and literary act, most classical Urdu poets composed at least a few couplets of naʿat, including Mir Taqi Mir, Momin Khan Momin, and Mirza Ghalib included devotional verses in their work. However, it was not until the first half of the nineteenth century that naʿat emerged as a distinct and recognized genre within Urdu poetry. The formal consolidation of naʿat as an independent genre is commonly attributed to Kifayat Ali Kafi, an Islamic scholar from Moradabad who was executed by the British in 1858 for his involvement in the Indian Rebellion of 1857. In the late nineteenth century, Mohsin Kakorvi and Ameer Meenai played a decisive role in refining naʿat poetry. Both poets published complete collections devoted exclusively to naʿat, a significant innovation at the time. Mohsin Kakorvi is often regarded as the first Urdu poet to dedicate his entire poetic output to the genre. Another major contributor to Urdu naʿat poetry was Ahmed Raza Khan Barelvi.

=== Pakistan ===
==== Beginnings and institutionalization ====
The na'at genre initially lacked acceptance within formal literary circles after the 1947 Partition, poets and advocates gradually worked to establish it as a respected genre. Poets such as Hafiz Taib (Abdul Hafeez Minhas) and Muzaffar Warsi are credited with elevating na'at's literary stature, to the extent that former Marxist or liberal poets such as Ahmad Nadeem Qasmi, Arif Abdul Mateen and Sarshar Siddiqui often turned or returned to religion through na'at; institutions such as the Kul Pakistan Mehfil-e-Naat and Pakistan’s first Naat College helped foster its practice and appreciation. Syed Riazuddin Soharwardi established Pakistan’s first Naat College in 1980 to formalize training in na'at recitation, an initiative credited with training thousands of practitioners and helping embed na'at in religious events, school assemblies, and cultural activities.

==== In politics ====
During the era of General Zia-ul-Haq, state patronage played a significant role in promoting Naatia literature, with government support encouraging poets to produce and publish na'at works. Despite this, na'at recitation remained only an occasional practice in Parliament until December 2015, when it became a permanent feature of the National Assembly after Captain (retd) Muhammad Safdar of the Pakistan Muslim League-Nawaz successfully moved a motion to amend parliamentary procedures; the motion was unanimously approved, expanding the opening recitations beyond Quranic verses alone. The practice has crossed ideological boundaries: in January 2021, Syed Ameer Ali Shah of the Pakistan Peoples Party took his oath in the Sindh Assembly by reciting a na'at. Na'at has also appeared in political rallies, notably through performances by Abrar-ul-Haq at events organized by Pakistan Tehreek-e-Insaf.

==== Popularization among the masses ====
Historically, Na'at Khwani was largely associated with the Barelvi school of thought, while other Sunni groups and Shia performers practiced it without formally adopting the identity of Naat Khwan. This began to change with the emergence of Junaid Jamshed, whose na'at albums broadened acceptance of the genre across Sunni factions and even influenced religious seminaries to promote na'at recitation and produce recordings. A similar shift occurred when qawwal Amjad Sabri embraced the Naat Khwan identity, unlike earlier generations such as the Sabri Brothers, who were known exclusively as qawwals. As na'at crossed traditional boundaries and gained commercial and artistic legitimacy, singers and qawwals increasingly adopted the Naat Khwan designation, helping to remove earlier stigmas attached to the genre.

== Language ==
Commonly, the term naʽat shareef (lit. 'exalted poetry') is reserved for poetry in the praise of Muhammad. In Arabic, na'at is usually called madih (lit. 'praise') or nasheed (lit. 'poetry'), although the latter can describe any type of religious poetry.

=== Urdu na'at anthologies ===
Naat Valley is a non-commercial digital archive that catalogs approximately 12,000 naʿat compositions in Urdu, performed by over 400 naʿat khawans (reciters). Some famous anthologies include:

- Hadaiqe Bakshish by Ahmad Raza Khan
- Wasail e Bakhsish by Muhammad Ilyas Qadri
- Tajalliyāt, by Syed Waheed Ashraf First Ed.(1996), Second Ed.(2018) ISBN 978-93-85295-76-8, Maktaba Jamia Ltd, Shamshad Market, Aligarh 202002, India
- Urdū zabān men̲ naʻt goʼī kā fann aur tajallīyāt, 2001 (OCLC 50912916) by Syed Waheed Ashraf
- Safeena e Bakhshish by Akhtar Raza Khan (Azhari Miya)

== Notable Na'at khawans and poets ==
=== Na'at poets ===
- Hassan ibn Thabit (c. 563–674)
- Pir Syed Meher Ali Shah (1859–1937)
- Amir Khusro (1253 – 1325 AD)
- Mian Muhammad Bakhsh (c. 1830–1907)
- Ahmed Raza Khan (1856 – 1921)
- Pir Syed Naseer-uddin-Naseer (1949–2009)
- Mustafa Raza Khan Qadri (1892–1981)
- Muhammad Ilyas Qadri (b. 1950)
- Syed Waheed Ashraf (b. 1933)
- Muzaffar Warsi (1933–2011)
- Akhtar Raza Khan (1943–2018)
- Muhammad Iqbal (1877–1938)
- Behzad Lucknavi (1900–1974)
- Tabish Mehdi (1951–2025)
- Bekal Utsahi (1924–2016)
- Ajmal Sultanpuri (1923–2020)

=== Urdu Na'at reciters ===
- Syed Sabihuddin Rehmani (b. 1965)
- Junaid Jamshed (1964–2016)
- Syed Fasihuddin Soharwardy (b. 1957)
- Siddiq Ismail (b. 1954)
- Khursheed Ahmad (1956–2007)
- Abdul Rauf Rufi

== See also ==
- Hamd
- Islam in South Asia
