= Alipur, Tando Muhammad Khan =

Pakistani village

Alipur Alīpur, Goth Alipur
- Village
- Location in Sindh Alipur (Pakistan)
- Coordinates: 25.055998°N 68.383048°E
- Country: Pakistan
- Region: Sindh
- District: Tando Muhammad Khan

Population (2017)
  - Total: 3,451
- Time zone: UTC+5 (PST)
  - Summer (DST): UTC+6 (PDT)

Alipur, aka Goth Alipur, is a village and deh in Bulri Shah Karim taluka of Tando Muhammad Khan District, Sindh, Pakistan. As of 2017, it has a population of 3,451, in 676 households. It is the seat of a tapedar circle, which also includes the villages of Qabool Pur, Raitishore, Sonhari, and Soomra.
