= Fasihuddin Suhrawardi =

Pakistani nasheed artist (born 1957)

Fasihuddin Suhrawardi فصیح الدین سھروردی
- Born: 15 June 1957 (age 68)
- Origin: Karachi, Sindh, Pakistan
- Genres: Hamds and Na`ats
- Occupation: Naat Khawan

Fasihuddin Suhrawardi (Note: Urdu: فصیح الدین سھروردی) (born 15 June 1957), also known as Qari Fasihuddin, (Note: Urdu: قاری فصیح الدین) is a Pakistani nasheed artist. Although most of his work is in Urdu, some of his nasheeds are also in Punjabi, Persian and Arabic.

== Early life and career ==
He was born on 15 June 1957 in Karachi, Pakistan. He has been performing nasheeds starting from a young age, and was heavily influenced by his father, Riazuddin Suhrawardi, who was a poet of Naats.

For his regular high school education, he did his high school from Government Secondary School and his Bachelor of Arts degree from the Government Islamia Science College, Karachi. He currently resides in Karachi, Pakistan but frequently travels to Europe and North America to perform in different shows and events.

His naat style is considered to be unique with a very powerful voice.
