= Seemin Jamali =

Pakistani medical doctor (1961–2023)

- سیمین جمالی
- Born: 19 August 1961
- Died: 27 May 2023 (aged 61); Karachi, Pakistan
- Years active: 1988–2021
- Organization: JPMC
- Known for: Medical services

Seemin Jamali (Urdu: سیمین جمالی; 19 August 1961 – 27 May 2023), also known as Iron Lady, Bullet Lady and Bomb-Proof Lady, was a Pakistani medical doctor and former executive director of Jinnah Postgraduate Medical Centre in Karachi. She was appointed Member of Sindh Public Service Commission (SPSC) in December 2022. She was the recipient of the Tamgha-e-Imtiaz (2019) and the Women Achievement Awards.

In October 2022, Jamali was given the honorary rank of Lieutenant Colonel by the Pakistan Army in recognition of her lifelong services.

== Early life ==
Jamali was born on 19 August 1961, to Ghulamullah Din Muhammad Memon. She studied in Gulistan Shah Abdul Latif School and graduated from Nawabshah Medical College in 1986.

== Career ==
Jamali joined JPMC in 1988. In 1993, she completed her master's degree in Primary Healthcare Management (MPHM) in Thailand. She took charge of JPMC's emergency department in 1995. She did a postdoctoral fellowship in Emergency Care in the US. She was awarded a scholarship for a post-doctoral fellowship in public health policy and injury prevention at the Johns Hopkins School of Public Health.

== Personal life and death ==
In 2020, Jamali was diagnosed with colon cancer, which was successfully treated at the time.

On 27 May 2023, Jamali died from a recurrence of cancer while being admitted to Aga Khan University Hospital, Karachi. She was 61.
