= Mohini Hameed =

Former Radio Pakistan Broadcaster

- Born: Mohini Das; 15 March 1922; Batala, Punjab, British India
- Died: 16 May 2009 (aged 87); Seattle, Washington
- Other name: Apa Shamim
- Citizenship: Pakistan
- Children: Kanwal Naseer (daughter)
- Awards: Tamgha-e-Imtiaz (1965)

Mohini Hameed (Urdu: موہنی حمید; 1922 - 16 May 2009, Seattle, Washington) better known as Apa Shamim or Shamim Apa, was the first Pakistani radio broadcaster, anchor and actress. On 14 August 1947, when Pakistan gained independence, Mohini became the first woman broadcaster of Pakistan. In May 2009 when she died, Lahore studio of Radio Pakistan was renamed 'Mohini Hameed Studio'. She was the mother of journalist Kanwal Naseer.

== Early life ==
Mohini (born Mohini Das) was born in 1922 in Batala of British India.

== Career ==
Mohini joined All-India Radio Lahore in 1939 at the age of 17. Soon Mohini became a major female Urdu-language voice. She voiced almost every major radio play, or special announcement during her time at All-India Radio Lahore. When Pakistan gained freedom from the British, Mohini opted for Pakistan as her home. Mohini Hameed worked at Radio Pakistan for 35 years.

== Personal life and death ==
In 1954, Mohini Das married A. Hameed and became Mohini Hameed. Mohini Hameed died on 16 May 2009 in Seattle, Washington.

== Awards and recognition ==
Mohini Hameed was awarded numerous national awards, including:

- In 1965, she received Tamgha-e-Imtiaz, Fourth-highest civilian award of Pakistan
- In 1998, she was again awarded 'Tamgha-e-Imtiaz'
- In 1999, she was given 'Lifetime Achievement Award' by the Pakistan Broadcasting Corporation
