= Muhammad Asif Khan =

Pakistani Geologist

Muhammad Asif Khan TI FPAS
- Born: November 19, 1954 (age 71); Dulmial, Chakwal, Punjab
- Education: University of Peshawar; Imperial College London; University of Texas at Dallas
- Awards: Tamgha-e-Imtiaz (2000)
- Scientific career
- Fields: Geology
- Workplaces: University of Peshawar

Vice-Chancellor of University of Peshawar
- Incumbent
- Assumed office Aug 2017

Vice-Chancellor of the Karakoram International University
- In office Jun 2014 – Aug 2017
- Preceded by: Dr. Najma Najam

Muhammad Asif Khan (Urdu: محمد آصف خان; born 19 November 1954) is a Pakistani geologist and current Vice-Chancellor of University of Peshawar.

== Education ==
Khan got his D.I.C and Ph.D. in 1988 from Imperial College London, B.Sc (Hons) and MSc Geology in 1980 from the University of Peshawar and four Post-Doctoral Fellowship at University of Oxford, the University of Texas at Dallas and Penn State University and Lehigh University.

== Awards and honors ==
- Tamgha-e-Imtiaz (2000)
- Fellowship of the Geological Society of London (2008)
- Fellowship of Pakistan Academy of Sciences (2009)
- HEC Distinguished National Professor (2012)
