= Anwar Khokhar =

Anwar Ali Khokhar
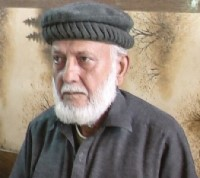
- Born: 1942; Minan village, Qambar, Sindh, British India
- Died: March 18, 2024 (aged 81–82); Larkana, Sindh, Pakistan
- Citizenship: Pakistani
- Occupation: Barber

Anwar Ali Khokhar (1942–2024) was a Pakistani philanthropist and barber who founded Khidmat-i-Masoom Welfare Trust. Through his trust, he helped abandoned, missing, homeless children, and elderly people.

Khokhar was born in 1942 in Qamber Shadadkot, Larkana.

In 2003, Khokhar was awarded the Tamgha-i-Imtiaz for his services, which included reuniting some 8,500 missing children with their parents.
