= Syed Matto Shah =

Pakistani village

Syed Matto Shah سیّد متو شاھ سیّد متو شاہ
- Village
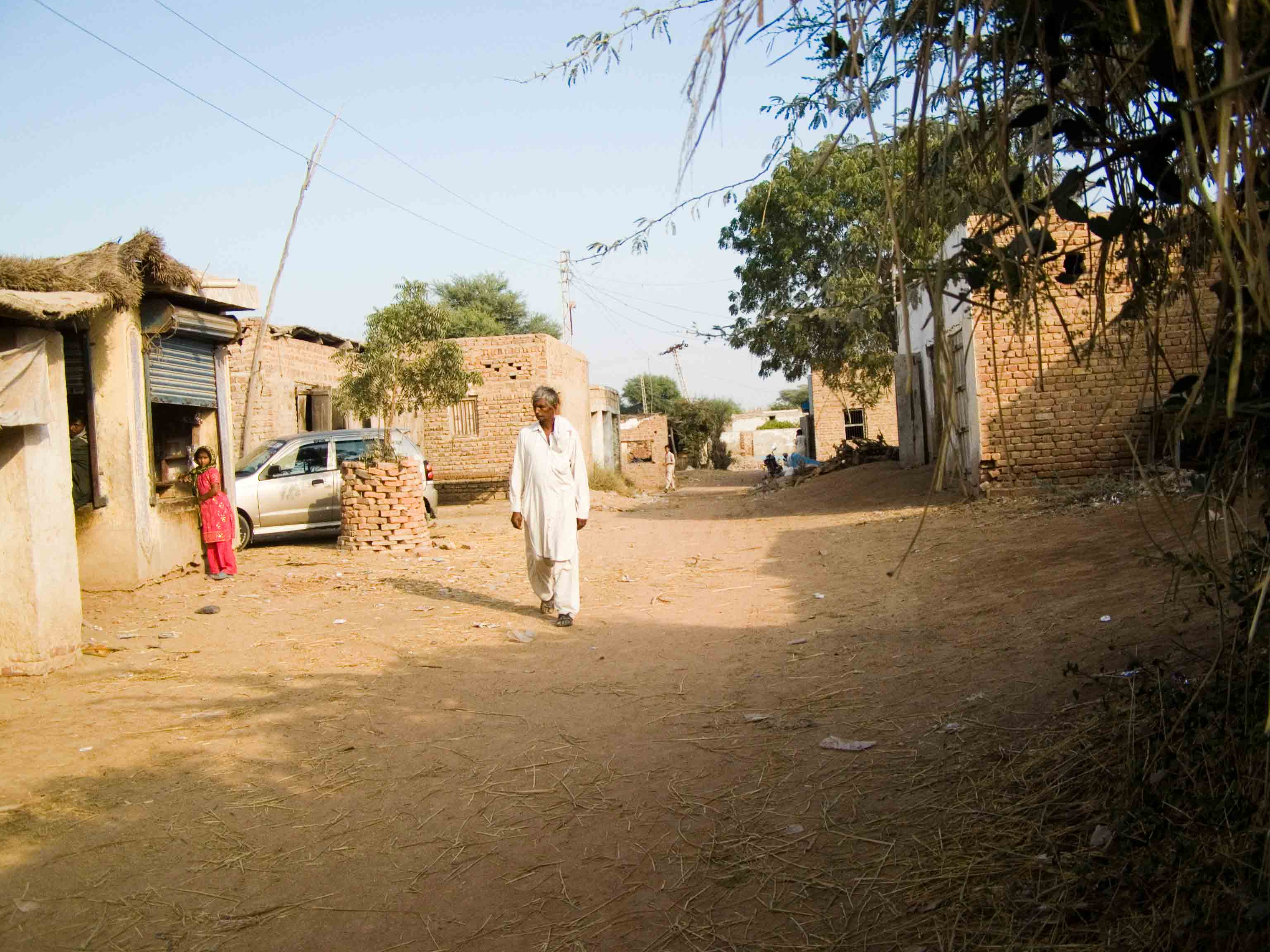
- 'Bazaar' or commercial street of village Syed Matto Shah
- Nickname: Saeed Matto
- Location in Sindh Location in Pakistan
- Coordinates: 25°53.58′N 68°37.51′E
- Country: Pakistan
- Region: Sindh
- District: Tando Muhammad Khan District
- Tehsil: Bulri Shah Karim Tehsil
- Union Council: Saeed Matto Union Council
- Elevation: 15 m (49 ft)

Population (2012)
  - Total: 700
- Time zone: UTC+5 (PST)

Syed Matto Shah (Sindhi: سیّد متو شاھ, Urdu: سیّد متو شاہ), also known as Saeed Matto, is a village located in union council Saeed Matto, Bulri Shah Karim Tehsil, Tando Muhammad Khan District, Sindh, Pakistan.

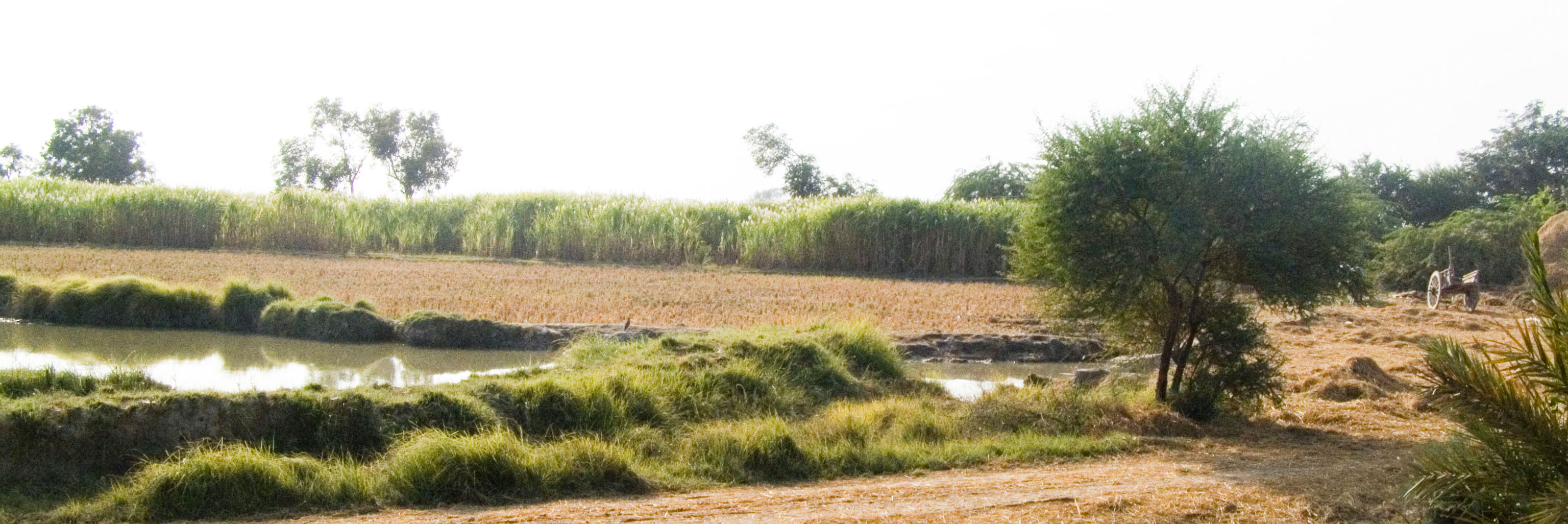
A sugarcane field in the village.

Before Pakistan's independence in 1947, the village was home to Hindus, Muslims, and Sikhs. After independence, many members of the Hindu and Sikh communities from Syed Matto Shah migrated to India, while Muslim refugees from India settled in the area. The current population of the union council includes Muslim and Hindu communities, with tribes such as Kolhi, Sathia, Solangi, and Siddi (also known as Qambrani or Sheedi).
