= Nasreen Anjum Bhatti =

Pakistani poet and political activist 1948-2016

- نسرین انجم بھٹی
- Born: Nasreen Anjum Bhatti; 26 January 1948
- Died: 6 April 2016 (aged 68)
- Occupations: Poet, Radio producer and broadcaster
- Known for: Rights activist, Feminist, Progressive Punjabi poet

Nasreen Anjum Bhatti (1948–2016) was a bilingual poet (Punjabi and Urdu languages), painter, radio producer and broadcaster, peace and political and rights activist and researcher. Bhatti was a progressive poet who struggled against dictatorship.

== Early life and career ==
Bhatti was born in Quetta but spent the childhood in Jacobabad, Sindh. She got early education in a school in Quetta where the Hazara girls would speak Persian. She was raised in art friendly environment at home. She studied art in National College of Arts (NCA) for two years but did not get a diploma. She did her master's in Urdu from the Oriental College in 1970 in Lahore before joining Radio Pakistan in 1971. Later she completed her master's degree in Punjabi during the job.

Bhatti became a part of Lahore's literary circle in 1970s when she started attending study circles of which Sarmad Sehbai, Fahim Jozi, Shahid Mehmood Nadeem and Kanwal Mushtaq were also a part. Najm Hosain Syed was her ideal, she attended weekly Punjabi poetry sessions at his place. She had started writing poetry at an age of nine which was printed in children's famous Pakistani magazine ‘Taleem-o-Tarbiat’. She was the editor of magazine in her college and contributed poems in Urdu and English, Sindhi and Punjabi but later she restricted to Punjabi and Urdu poetry only. Bhatti joined Radio Pakistan in 1971 through a talent-hunt programme where she used to arrange student activities and read articles and poems in literary radio programmes.

In her interview to Dawn News, she said, that as a student of literature, company of literary icons like Abdullah Hussain, Anees Nagi, Intizar Hussain, Kishwar Naheed and Azizul Haque helped her groom. She turned into an artist while working with people like Munir Niazi, Amanat Ali Khan, G.A. Chishti, Nasir Kazmi, Zaheer Kashmiri, Wazeer Afzal and Sufi Tabassum. She worked in Radio Pakistan as producer, broadcaster and deputy controller. She also worked as resident director of Shakir Ali Museum. She was awarded Tamgha-i-Imtiaz in 2011.

Bhatti was diagnosed with cancer in 2015 and she was put on chemotherapy at CMH Lahore. Later, she moved to Karachi where she was getting treatment at PNS hospital. She is survived by a son who has been abroad.

== Punjabi literature and feminism ==
Bhatti was a feminist Punjabi poet and rights activist. She wrote four books, two Punjabi and two in Urdu language, “Neel Karayaan Neelkan” (1979), “Athay Pehr Tarah” (2009), “Bin Bass” and “Tera Lehja Badalney Tak”.

Bhatti was considered to be one of the last crusaders of “literature of resistance”. She challenged the inherited patriarchy-driven socio-cultural norms and class-based politico-economic structure through her poetic expression. She was a socially conscious artist who exposed the nature of political system that is based on exploitation of people's share in all the basic rights. Being a feminist poet, she explored the complex process of how patriarchy, cultural values, societal norms, customs and traditions created gender bias and reduced women to a commodity. Her poetry depicts an organic link between patriarchal practices and political oppression.
