= Nauman Niaz =

Pakistani Television presenter (born 1969)

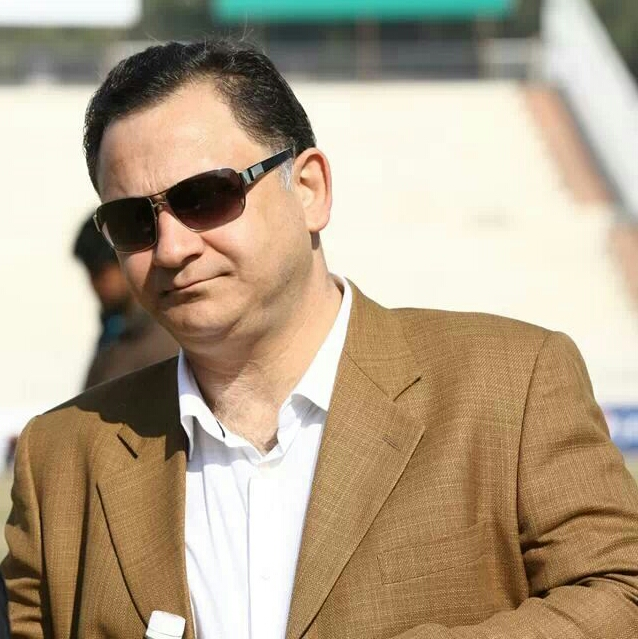
- Niaz in 2014.
- Born: November 19, 1969 (age 56); Lahore, West Pakistan
- Occupation: Sports personality
- Years active: 1999–present
- Sports commentary career
- Team: Pakistan
- Sport: Cricket
- Employer: Pakistan Cricket Board; Pakistan Television Corporation

Nauman Niaz (born 19 November 1969) is a Pakistani television personality, cricket correspondent, and author. Acknowledged for his significant contributions to sports journalism and broadcasting, Niaz has been honored with the Tamgha-e-Imtiaz, one of Pakistan's prestigious Civil Awards.

Niaz has contributed articles to newspapers and has served as the anchor for numerous live cricket shows. In 2010, he authored Pakistan Cricket "The Story of Betrayal" and holds the esteemed position of the official historian of Pakistan Cricket. In 2005, the Pakistan Cricket Board (PCB) commissioned his book, titled The Fluctuating Fortunes.

== Early life and education ==
Niaz, the third child of Nusrat Hamid and Lieutenant General Hamid Niaz (retd.) of the Pakistan Army, was born in Lahore, West Pakistan. His educational journey commenced at St Mary’s Academy, Rawalpindi in 1975, followed by enrollment at Aitchison College, Lahore. Upon obtaining his Bachelors in Medicine and Bachelors in Surgery (MBBS) from the Army Medical College, Niaz served at the Holy Family Hospital in Rawalpindi. Subsequently, he pursued and completed his postgraduate studies in endocrinology.

A distinguished professional, Niaz is a member of the Royal College of Physicians and a Fellow of the Royal College of Physicians of Edinburgh. His academic achievements also include a Ph.D. from the University of Western Australia and a postdoctoral qualification from the University of Oxford.

== Cricket career ==
In 1999, he commenced his professional journey as a postgraduate trainee at Holy Family Hospital. Subsequently, he transitioned to the realm of sports administration by assuming the role of Media Coordinator at the Pakistan Cricket Board (PCB). His proficiency and dedication led to his promotion to the position of Manager Coordinator at the Asian Cricket Council. Shortly thereafter, Niaz assumed the responsibility of media manager for the Pakistan Cricket Board, contributing to the organization's communication and media relations.

=== 2021 Shoaib Akhtar spat ===
On October 28, 2021, Nauman Niaz was removed from the Pakistan Television Corporation(PTV) broadcast after a dispute during the widely-watched program Game on Hai, featuring former fast bowler Shoaib Akhtar. Niaz subsequently conveyed remorse, acknowledging, "I had no right. To err is human, and for that, I apologize—not only once but a million times. Shoaib has been a rockstar. Whatever happened on camera was unbecoming." In 2025, Nauman send a legal notice to shoaib akhtar after the later called him the team’s “kitman” on a show.
