= Kanwal Naseer =

Pakistani journalist and television news anchor (1943–2021)

- Born: 23 January 1948; Lahore, Punjab, Pakistan
- Died: 25 March 2021 (aged 73); Islamabad, Pakistan
- Years active: 1963–2021
- Employer(s): Pakistan Television Corporation; Radio Pakistan
- Spouse: Colonel Naseer (until her death in 2021)
- Mother: Mohini Hameed
- Awards: Pride of Performance Award by the President of Pakistan (2002)

Kanwal Naseer or Kanwal Hameed (23 January 1948 – 25 March 2021) was a Pakistani journalist at Pakistan Television Network, having the honor of being Pakistan's first female news presenter and anchor.

== Early life ==
Kanwal Naseer was born in 1948 in Lahore, Pakistan. Her mother Mohini Hameed (also affectionately known as 'Aapa Shameem') was a broadcaster and actress.

== Career ==
Kanwal Naseer made her first appearance for Pakistan Television (PTV) on 26 November 1964 (PTV's first broadcasting day). She worked for the state-run Pakistan Television Corporation for nearly 50 years.

== Awards and recognition ==
In 2002, she was awarded the Pride of Performance Award by the President of Pakistan.

== Death ==
She died on 25 March 2021, in Islamabad, Pakistan after a brief illness at age 73.
