= A. S. Nathaniel =

Pakistani nurse (died 2013)

- Died: 6 October 2013
- Burial place: Christian Cemetery, Jail Road, Lahore
- Occupation: Nurse
- Years active: 1938–1980
- Spouse: Salas Nathaniel
- Children: 3

A. S. Nathaniel (died 2013) was a Pakistani nurse who served Muhammad Ali Jinnah in his last days at Ziarat residency. She was recruited in 1938 in the Health Department and was specially assigned to attend to Jinnah in 1948. She retired in 1980. In 2000, Ms Nathaniel was awarded the Tamgha-i-Imtiaz for her services by former Pakistani President Rafique Tarrar. She died on October 6, 2013, and is buried at the Christian Cemetery at Jail Road, Lahore.

== Personal life ==
She was married to Salas Nathaniel and had three children, namely, Dr Victor Nathaniel, Dr Maureen Christy Munir and Keith Sadiq Nathaniel. She was a practicing Christian.
