= Rajo Nizamani =

moiz Nizamani
- Town
- Country: Pakistan
- Province: Sindh
- District: Tando Muhammad Khan

Moiz Nizamani is a town in Taluka, Tando Muhammad Khan district, Sindh, Pakistan. The town is located about 10 km (6.2 mi) in the northeast of district headquarters of Tando Muhammad Khan on the main road of Baqar Nizamani. The town has a population of about 20,000 people with different castes like DARS' Nizamani, Qambrani/Sheedi, Khaskeli, Unar and Qureshi. The town is divided into five major parts: DARS Muhalla 'Nizamani Muhalla, Sheedi Muhalla, Unar, Muhalla and Duri Muhalla WaluAbad.

== Education ==
There are four primary schools, two secondary schools, 1 model school and one higher secondary school. There is a lake (Phitto, which means deformed) there is a bypass road linked with the lake.

The Sachal Library of Rajo Nizamani has played a role to develop ideas of the students as they can study in the different universities of Pakistan. Sachal Library has been open since 1995. Due to this many students are studying and a new idea has arisen for higher education. The town also has a welfare Association, the Sachal Young Welfare Association.

== Political structure ==
Politically Rajo Nizamani Town is divided into three main parties:

1. Pakistan Peoples Party PPP,
2. Jamat-e-Islami JI and PTI.

PPP came there by the time of Zulfiqar Ali Bhutto (the former of PPP), the introduction of Jamat-e-Islami was done by Mama Gul Mohammad Nizamani also called Bhutto of Rajo Nizamani by local population, the third main party is PTI. This party came here by the efforts of two youngsters Salman Nizamani and Muhammad Hassan Nizamani. Muhammad Hassan Nizamani is locally called Chacho.TI has emerged as a third big in this town and grown rapidly.

Among three said parties, JI and PTI are running their own welfare organizations and work to help people to resolve their problems without having power in the government. PTI manly runs SYWA NGO to provide guideline and career counseling to the new students entering the universities while JI mainly works to help poor people in terms of health, food supply, financial help, flood relief.

PPP has always ruled being in government. Due to lack of interest to resolve the town issues and less participation in the infrastructure development of town, this party losing its popularity and facing a big resistance caused by JI and PTI.

In Feb 2024 PTI secured the Main Political Position when the PTI Candidate Sultan Nizamani Became Chairman.
