= Kanwal Feroze =

Pakistani scholar, poet, writer and journalist

Kanwal Feroze is a Pakistani scholar, poet, writer, journalist and media analyst. He was born in 1938 in Ferozepur, India, and migrated to Sargodha, Pakistan. He moved to Lahore in 1958 and has since been playing an important role in the literary activities of the city.

He is the Chief Editor of the monthly Urdu language journal Shadaab, which is an independent, socio-political and literary magazine which has specialized in minority issues and have promoted inter-religious peace and harmony since 1969.

He holds a Ph.D. in Community Journalism.

In February 2005, he was honoured by the Pakistan Academy of Letters.

In 2009, he was awarded the Tamgha-i-Imtiaz (President's Medal of Excellence) in Literature by the Government of Pakistan. He was the first Christian Literary personality of Pakistan to have been given this award in Literature

His poetry has been published in four volumes:

- Shahar-e- Saleeb-o-Gul – 1967
- Shaakh-e-Shab-e-Wisaal - 1992
- Shaam-e-Firat-e-Dil - 2002
- Shafaq-e-Subh-e-Ghazal - 2009
- Shikast-e-Sada-e--Dil
