= Saadat Saeed =

- سعادت سعید
- Born: 15 March 1949 (age 77); Lahore, Pakistan
- Education: University of the Punjab
- Occupations: professor, poet, writer
- Website: saadatsaeed.ca

Saadat Saeed is a professor of Urdu language and literature at Government College University, Lahore and contemporary critic and poet of Urdu language.

== Early life ==
Saadat Saeed was born at Lahore on 15 March 1949 as Saadat Hassan. His father A. D. Nasim was known in the various fields of Urdu language and literature.

== Education ==
1. In 1963, Saadat Saeed passed his matriculation from Board of Intermediate and Secondary Education, Lahore. After passing Intermediate from the same board in 1965 he got admission in University of the Punjab. He got his first degree with a roll of honour and scholarship in 1967. In 1969, Saadat Saeed stood first in M.A. Urdu and received a gold medal. In 1988 he completed his PhD from the same university.
2. PhD 1988 Urdu Qasida University of the Punjab Lahore.
3. M.A. 1969 Urdu (with Gold Medal)First class First in Punjab University of the Punjab Lahore.
4. B.A. 1967 Urdu, philosophy, English
5. Persian(Roll of Honour) University of the Punjab Lahore.
6. F.A 1965 English, philosophy, History. Persian Board of Higher Secondary and Intermediate Lahore

== Teaching career ==
In 1970, Saadat Saeed started his career as a lecturer from Govt. Islamia College, Lyallpur (Faisalabad). Three years after, he was transferred to Govt. Islamia College, (Railway Road) Lahore. He joined Government College, Lahore in 1986 as a lecturer. After some time, he was first promoted as Assistant Professor and then Associate Professor in 1995. He was transferred to Government College, Asghar Mall, Rawalpindi as Professor in 1999. After serving a few months there, he moved to Ankara University, Turkey as chairman Ankara Urdu Chair. In 2004, he returned to Pakistan and again joined GC University, Lahore as Professor.

== Books ==
- Jayhat Numayee (Studies in Contemporary Short story) Published by Dastavez Matboaat Lahore. 1995
- Fun Aur Khaliq (Studies in Contemporary Poetry) Dastavez Matboaat Lahore.
- Iqbal aik Saqafti Tnazur Dastavez Matboaat Lahore.1998
- Kajli Bun (Poems) Published by Sang-e-Meel publication Lahore 1988.
- Adab Aur Nafi-e-Adab Dastavez Matboaat Lahore.1999
- Iqbal and The Sahiwal (Editor) Published by Iqbal Academy Lahore
- Ibn-e-Arabi Ka Nazria-e-Wahdat ul Wajood (Editor) Published by Iqbal-Shariati Foundation Lahore
- Chand Waqt Translation from Turkish poetry Maktba Al Farooq Wahdat Road Lahore 1998.
- Bansry Chup Hey Dastavez Matboat Urdu Bazar Lahore.
- Fanoon Asob Maktaba Alblag Urdu Bazar Lahore

== Awards ==
Tamgha e Imtiaz
