= Ishrat Fatima =

Pakistani TV newscaster

- عشرت فاطمہ
- Born: Pakistan
- Other name: Ishrat Fatima Saqib
- Occupations: Television newsreader, Radio presenter
- Years active: c. (approx.) 1970s–2010s
- Known for: Urdu news-bulletin anchor on Pakistan Television (PTV) and Radio Pakistan for ~35 years.
- Spouse: Saqib Waheed (m. 1996)
- Children: 2
- Awards: Pride of Performance (2019); Tamgha-i-Imtiaz

Ishrat Fatima or Ishrat Fatima Saqib is a former Pakistani newsreader and radio presenter who worked for Pakistan Television and Radio Pakistan for 35 years.

== Early life ==
She was born in Pakistan and lives in Islamabad, Pakistan in 2019.

== Career ==
Ishrat Fatima was 'the face' of 9 pm daily Urdu news Khabarnama news program in the 1980s and 1990s. She started her career at Radio Pakistan hosting a program Khel aur Khiladi. At that time, she was still attending school. She had gone to PTV to audition for a weather segment, but instead was selected for the news segment.

Ishrat Fatima was called "a poised lady presenting news with elegance". She seemed to have a great command of the Urdu language while presenting the news with an abundance of self-confidence. Ishrat used to wear simple and ordinary clothes and was also known for wearing her diamond nose-ring. TV viewers used to be impressed with her grace with which she presented news on TV, coupled with her strong screen presence. During an interview with a Pakistani English-language newspaper, she said that she used to put in effort and time in rehearsing before she actually went on-screen, including fact-checking everything she would later present on-screen.

Ishrat Fatima worked for 35 years in the news industry of Pakistan before retiring. Later, she started presenting news bulletins on Pakistan at Voice of America.

== Personal life ==
She got married in 1996 to Saqib Waheed. After marriage, she was also known as Ishrat Fatima Saqib. They have two children.

== Awards and recognition ==
- Pride of Performance Award in 2019 by the President of Pakistan.
- Tamgha-i-Imtiaz (Medal of Excellence) by the Government of Pakistan
- Nigar Award
