= Syed Sabihuddin Rehmani =

Pakistan Naat reciter, poet and naat literature researcher and critic

- صبیح الدین رحمانی
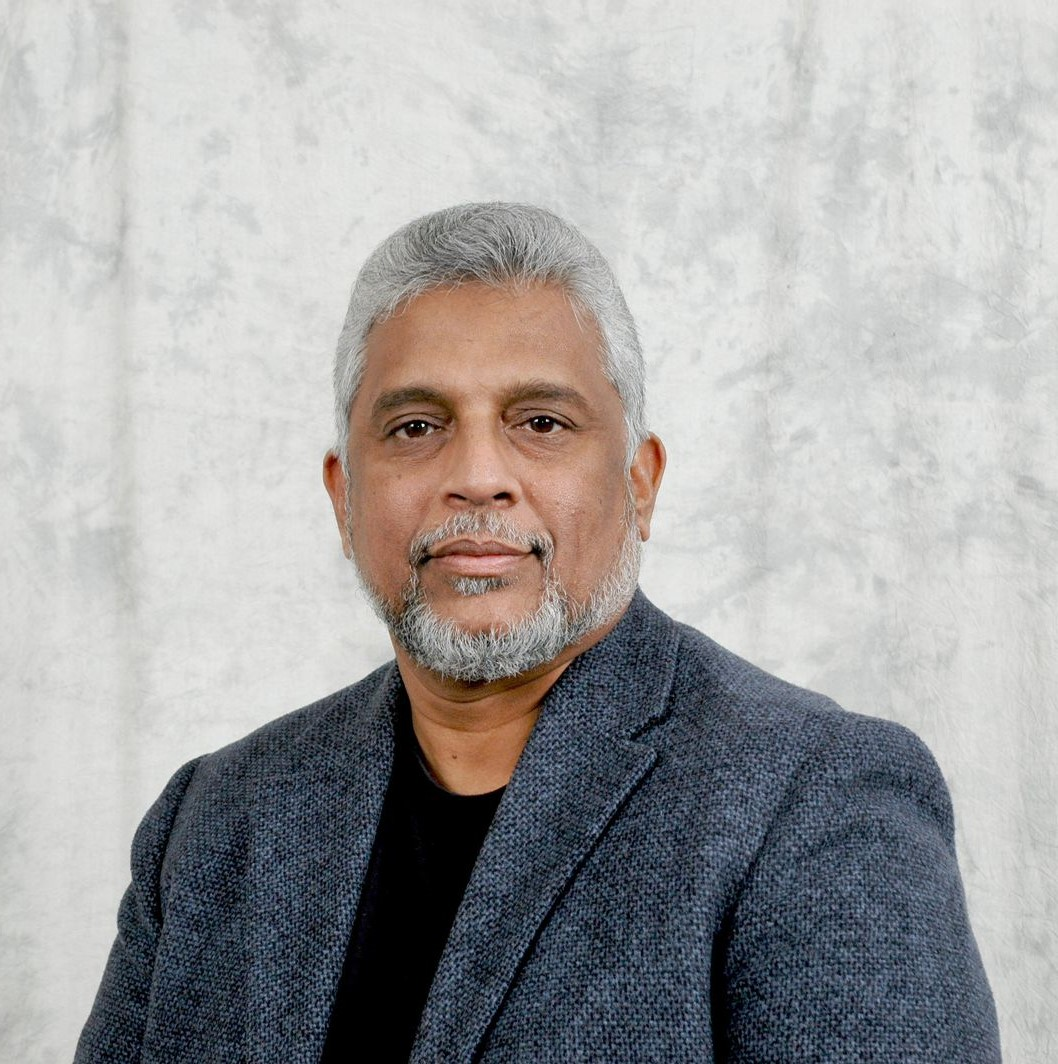
- Born: June 27, 1965 (age 61)
- Occupations: Naat Khawan, Poet and Critic
- Writing career
- Pen name: Sabih Rehmani
- Language: Urdu
- Years active: 1983-present
- Notable awards: Tamgha-e-Imtiaz
- Website: www.sabih-rehmani.com

Syed Sabihuddin Rehmani (born June 27, 1965) is a Pakistani naat khawan, poet, naat literature researcher and critic. He is the founder and secretary general of Naat Research Center, an organization that studies Naat. In recognition of his work, the Government of Pakistan awarded him the Tamgha-e-Imtiaz in 2019.

== Early life ==
Syed Sabihuddin Rehmani was born to Syed Ishaquddin in Karachi and his ancestors belong to the Sadat family of Hyderabad Deccan. He earned Bachelor of Arts and Master of Arts degrees from the University of Karachi in 1987 and 1998.

== Career ==
Sabih Rehmani started working at Pakistan Telecommunication Company Limited in 1983 as a telephone operator. He joined private TV channel ARY as Research Director in 2001 and later served as senior producer. He was promoted to Director Programs and Planning.

He is the editor of Naat Rang journal.

In 2022, the general meeting elected him as the new president of Idara Yadgar-e-Ghalib.

He holds the position of secretary general of Naat Research Center Karachi.

== Publications ==
His publications include:

- Maah-e-Taiba (1998)
- Jada-e-Rehmat (1993)
- Aiwan-e-Na’at (1993)

== Recognition ==
- 2019 - Tamgha-e-Imtiaz, Government of Pakistan
