= Tamgha-e-Imtiaz =

Fourth-highest civilian award of Pakistan

Tamgha-e-Imtiaz تمغۂِ امتیاز
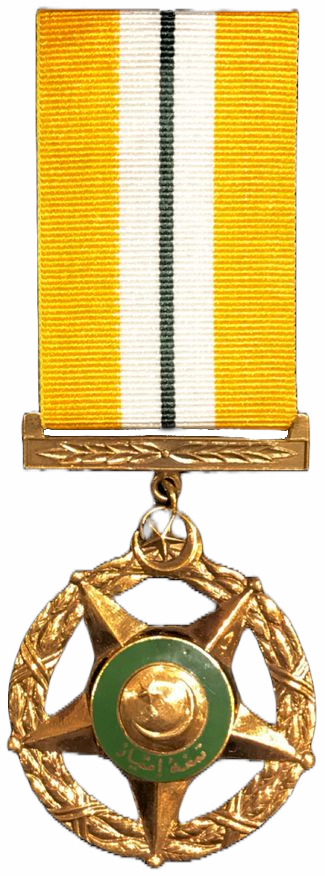
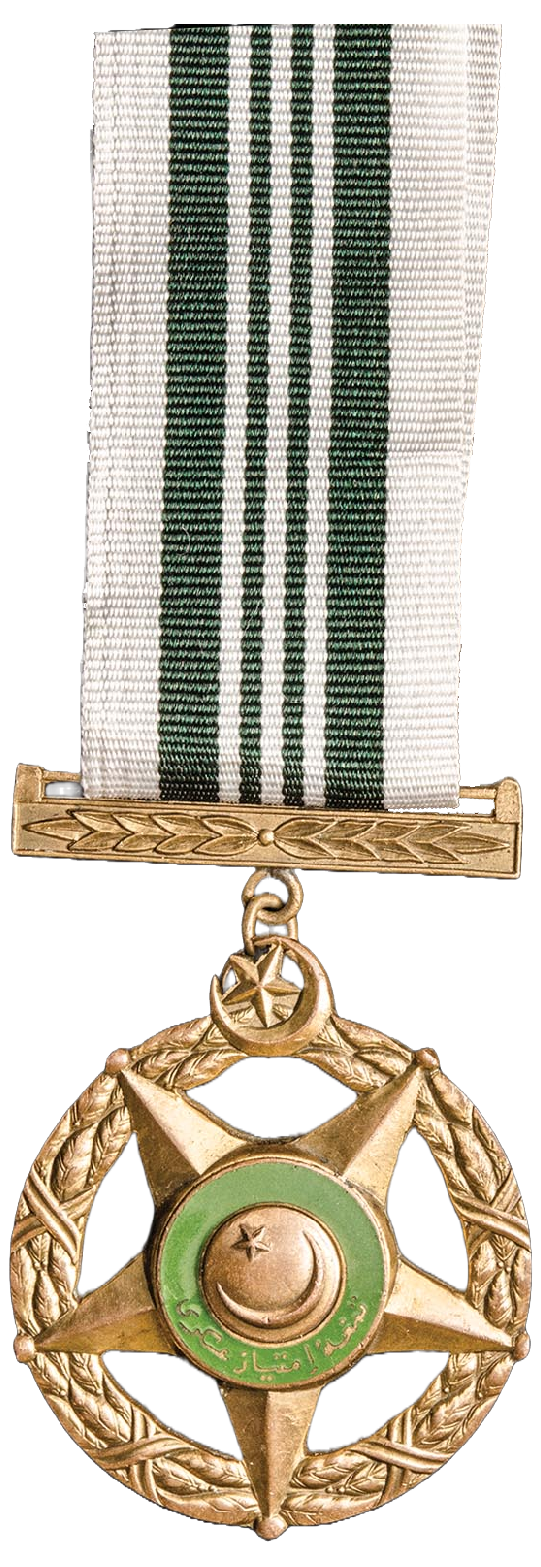
- Obverse Medals for Up: Tamgha-e-Imtiaz (Civilian); Down: Tamgha-e-Imtiaz (Military)

Awarded by Government of Pakistan
- Type: Award
- Established: 19 March 1957
- Country: Islamic Republic of Pakistan
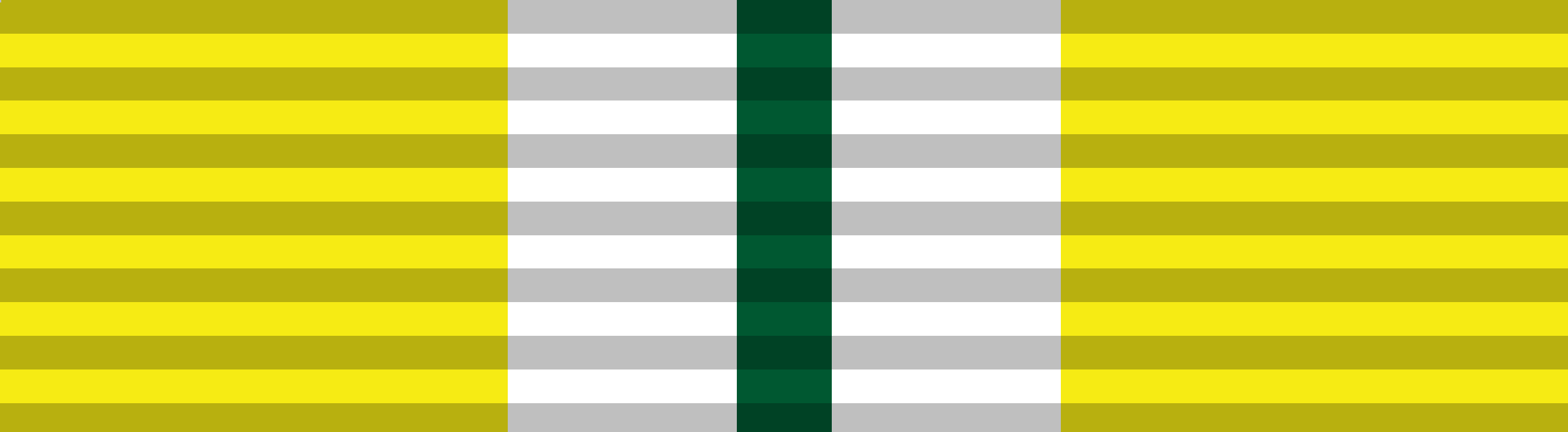
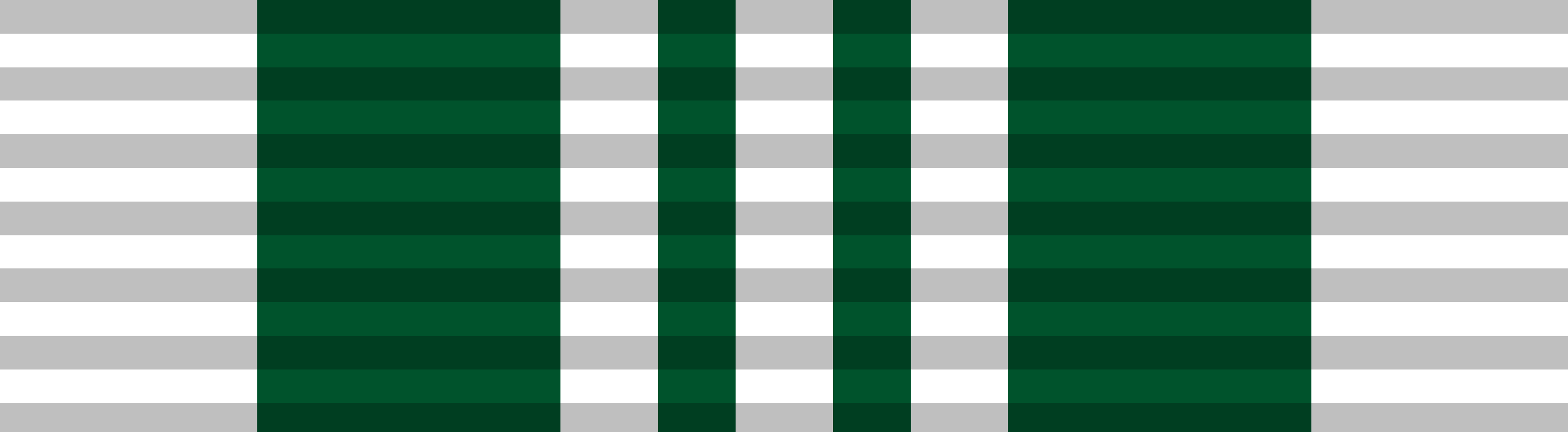
- Ribbon: Tamgha-e-Imtiaz (Civilian) Tamgha-e-Imtiaz (Military)
- Eligibility: Pakistanis and foreign citizens
- Awarded for: Service to the state, and for services to international diplomacy.
- Status: Currently constituted

Statistics
- First induction: 19 March 1957

Precedence
- Next (higher): Sitara-e-Imtiaz

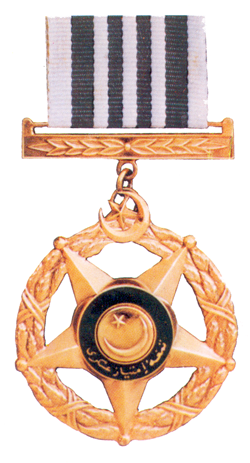

Tamgha-e-Imtiaz (Urdu: تمغۂِ امتیاز, lit. 'Medal of Excellence'), also spelled as Tamgha-i-Imtiaz, is a state-bestowed honour of Pakistan. It is given to any civilian in Pakistan based on their achievements. While it is a civilian/military award, it can be bestowed upon officers of the Pakistan Armed Forces and worn on their uniform. It can also be awarded to foreign citizens who have performed great service to Pakistan.

== Grades of the Order of Imtiaz ==
This award is the 4th Grade in the Order of Imtiaz (Excellence). The four Grades in the Order of Imtiaz are:

1. Nishan-e-Imtiaz (Order of Excellence; Urdu: نشانِ امتیاز)
2. Hilal-e-Imtiaz (Crescent of Excellence; Urdu: ہلالِ امتیاز)
3. Sitara-e-Imtiaz (Star of Excellence; Urdu: ستارہ امتیاز)
4. Tamgha-e-Imtiaz (Medal of Excellence; Urdu: تمغۂِ امتیاز).

ORDER OF IMTIAZ (CIVILIAN)
Nishan-e-Imtiaz	Hilal-e-Imtiaz	Sitara-e-Imtiaz	Tamgha-e-Imtiaz

ORDER OF IMTIAZ (MILITARY)
Nishan-e-Imtiaz	Hilal-e-Imtiaz	Sitara-e-Imtiaz	Tamgha-e-Imtiaz

== Service Ribbon Insignia ==
The ribbon for the Tamgha-e-Imtiaz (Civilian) is:

- Yellow with a white centre band and a narrow Pakistan Green stripe in the middle.

The ribbon for the Tamgha-e-Imtiaz (Military) is:

- White edges with Pakistan Green center band and three equal stripes in the middle, separated by two equal-sized Pakistan Green stripes.

== Glimpse Of Recipients ==
Year	Recipient	Field / Occupation	State / Country	Ref.
—N/a	Abdul Razzaq Anjum	Pakistan Air Force	Pakistan	
—N/a	Ishrat Fatima	Newsreader	Islamabad	
—N/a	Laiq Zada Laiq	Literature	Madyan, Pakistan	
—N/a	Shoaib Hashmi	Art	Pakistan	
1960	Abul Rauf Seemab	Art	Peshawar, Pakistan	
1960	Sadequain	Art	Pakistan	
1962	Shaukat Thanvi	Journalism	Lahore, Punjab	
1962	Nabi Bakhsh Baloch	Education	Sindh	
1963	Tariq Mustafa	Science	Faisalabad, Punjab	
1965	Mohini Hameed		Lahore, Punjab	
1966	Noor Jehan	Art	Karachi, Sindh	
1969	Muslehuddin	Art	East Pakistan	
1979	Qari Shakir Qasmi	Art	Punjab, Rawalpindi	
1986	Jilani Kamran	Literature	Lahore, Punjab	
1989	Muhammad Umer	Football (Sports)	Karachi, Sindh	
1992	Dr. Maj. Farkhanda Sadiq	Army Medical Corps	Lahore, Punjab	
1998	Muhammad Iqbal Choudhary	Science	Karachi, Sindh	
1998	Mohini Hameed		Lahore, Punjab	
2000	Muhammad Asif Khan	Science	Chakwal, Punjab	
2001	Mustafa Shameel	Science	Karachi, Sindh	
2002	A. S. Nathaniel	Health care	Lahore, Punjab	
2003	Anwar Khokhar	Philanthropy	Larkana, Sindh	
2003	Muhammad Ali Shah	Services (Sports)	Pakistan	
2004	Mian Muhammad Latif	Industrialist	Toba Tek Singh, Punjab	
2004	Rahimullah Yusufzai	Journalism	Mardan, Khyber Pakhtunkhwa	
2005	Abrar-ul-Haq	Philanthropy, Art	Faisalabad, Punjab	
2005	Manzoor Niazi Qawwal	Art	Karachi, Sindh	
2006	Hadiqa Kiani	Art	Rawalpindi, Punjab	
2006	Shuja Ud Din Malik	Weightlifting	Gujranwala, Punjab	
2007	Junaid Jamshed	Art	Karachi, Sindh	
2008	Atif Aslam	Art	Wazirabad, Punjab	
2009	Kanwal Feroze	Literature	Punjab	
2011	Nasreen Anjum Bhatti	Art	Sindh	
2011	Ghulam Abbas	Art	Lahore, Punjab	
2012	Raihan Merchant	Businessman	Karachi, Sindh	
2012	Saba Qamar	Art	Hyderabad, Sindh	
2012	Sami Khan	Art	Lahore, Punjab	
2012	Dr. Majjida Bashir Ahmed	Medicine	Sindh	
2013	Faisal Mushtaq	Education	Kharian, Punjab	
2013	Khalid Masud Gondal	Health, Education	Mandi Bahauddin, Punjab	
2014	Mohammad Tahir Shah	Geology	Sirikot, Khyber Pakhtunkhwa	
2014	Nauman Niaz	Journalism	Lahore, Punjab	
2014	Saadat Saeed	Literature	Lahore, Punjab	
2014	Shakil Auj	Education	Karachi, Sindh	
2015	Abdul Bari Khan	Health	Karachi, Sindh	
2015	Zahid Ur Rashdi	Education	Gujranwala, Punjab	
2016	Mohammad Hameed Shahid	Literature	Punjab	
2016	Dadi Leela	Education	Hyderabad, Sindh	

=== 2019 ===
Seemin Jamali	Medicine	Sindh, Pakistan
Syed Sabihuddin Rehmani	Arts (Naat Recitation/ Literature)	Sindh, Pakistan
Ms. Mehwish Hayat	Art(Acting)	Sindh, Pakistan

=== 2020 ===
Mr. Abdul Majid Jahangir	Arts (Acting)	Sindh
Major Ahmed Osman (Retd)	Pakistan Army	Punjab, Pakistan

=== 2021 ===
Rubina Mustafa Qureshi	Art (Singing)	Sindh, Pakistan
Lt.Col Munazzam Jah (Retd)	Pakistan Army	Balochistan, Pakistan

=== 2023 ===
Pakistan conferred a series of civil awards in 2023 to recognize exceptional contributions across various fields. The recipients demonstrated outstanding achievements in literature, arts, sports, social services, public service, and other domains. Further to the list provided below, a poignant tribute was paid to the healthcare sector, with 299 individuals posthumously awarded the Tamgha-i-Imtiaz for their selfless sacrifices during the COVID-19 pandemic. These awards serve as a testament to the nation's gratitude for the invaluable services rendered by these heroes.

#	Recipient	Field / Occupation	Ref.
1	Mr. Zubair Imam Malik	Philanthropy	
2	Dr. Ghazala Shaheen (Martyr)	Medicine (COVID-19)	
3	Mr. Abdul Hafeez Khan	Philanthropy	
4	Mr. Asad Ullah Khalid	Gallantry	
5	Dr. Mohammad Al-Arabi Bouazizi	Services to Pakistan	
6	Dr. Javaid Ahmed Sheikh	Services to Pakistan	
7	Mr. Salman Ilyas Khan	Services to Pakistan	
8	Dr. Shaukat Saeed	Science (Materials Chemistry)	
9	Prof. Dr. Sardar Khan	Science (Environmental Science)	
10	Prof. Dr. Abdul Naeem Khan	Science (Chemistry)	
11	Dr. Haider Abbas	Science	
12	Mr. Abdul Aleem Haider	Science (Physics)	
13	Dr. Muhammad Usman Akram	Engineering	
14	Dr. Tahir Masood	Engineering	
15	Dr. Salman Raza Naqvi	Engineering	
16	Dr. Hammad Omer	Engineering	
17	Mr. Murli Dhar	Engineering (Architect)	
18	Syed Sabahat Hussain	Mechanical Engineering	
19	Mr. Muhammad Amin Warraich	Project Management	
20	Mr. Asif Iqbal	Mechanical Engineering	
21	Dr. Manzoor Ikram	Science (Physics)	
22	Dr. Muhammad Zamurad Shah	Electrical Engineering	
23	Dr. Rashid Ahmad Bhatti	Electrical Engineering	
24	Dr. Nasir Mehmood	Mechanical Engineering	
25	Dr. Nadia Jamil	Genetics	
26	Dr. Sajid Yaqub	Engineering (Mechanical)	
27	Mr. Imran Sarwar	Satellite Communications	
28	Dr. Muhammad Imran Afzal	Engineering (Mechanical)	
29	Prof. Dr. Muhammad Yar	Education (Chemistry)	
30	Prof. Dr. Aamer Saeed Bhatti	Education (Chemistry)	
31	Prof. Dr. Shahid Munir	Education	
32	Dr. Waseem Azhar (USA)	Education	
33	Dr. Talat Mehmood (Germany)	Education	
34	Dr. Muhammad Ajmal Sawand (Shaheed)	Education (I.T. & Higher Management)	
35	Prof. Dr. Zia ul Haq	Education	
36	Prof. Dr. Mushtaq Ahmad	Education	
37	Dr. Hassan Imran Afridi	Education	
38	Mr. Anwar Amjad	Education	
39	Dr. Syed Mehmood Raza	Education	
40	Dr. Shagufta Jabeen	Medicine	
41	Prof Sajjad Naseer	Education	
42	Ms. Kanwal Ameen	Education	
43	Dr. Shahid Hamid	Medicine	
44	Dr. Rashid Siddiqui	Medicine	
45	Dr. Shaukat Yousaf Khan	Medicine	
46	Mr. Muhammad Arshad Chohan	Medicine	
47	Prof. Rizwan Taj	Medicine (Psychiatry, Medical Education)	
48	Dr. Nadeem Qamar	Medicine (Cardiologist)	
49	Prof. Dr. Muhammad Iqbal Afridi	Medicine (Psychiatry)	
50	Dr. Umraz Khan	Medicine (Plastic Surgery)	
51	Mr. Khalid Waheed	Medicine	
52	Dr. Rizwan Jamil Rahman	Medicine	
53	Prof. Dr. Irfan Manzoor Bakhshi	Medicine	
54	Mr. Moquit Usman	Medicine	
55	Dr. Ghulam Abbas	Medicine	
56	Prof. Dr. Ali Raza Hashmi	Medicine	
57	Dr. Yasir Arafat Gabol	Medicine	
58	Dr. Awais Ahmed Lakhair	Medicine	
59	Qari Waseem Ullah Amin	Arts (Qira'at)	
60	Mr. Muhammad Shahbaz Qamar	Arts (Naat Khawani)	
61	Ms. Sajal Ali	Arts (Acting)	
62	Syeda Mehrbano Kazim (Alias Juggan Kazim)	Arts (Anchoring/Acting)	
63	Mr. Abdul Batin Farooqi	Arts (Acting)	
64	Mr. Almas Khan Khalil	Arts (Folk Pashto Singing)	
65	Mr. Fazal Wahab Dard	Arts (Singing)	
66	Ustad Rustam Fateh Ali Khan	Arts (Classical Singing)	
67	Mr. Imran Aziz Mian	Arts (Qawwali)	
68	Mr. Arbab Khan Khoso	Arts (Alghoza Playing)	
69	Mr. Jehanzeb Malik	Arts (Painting)	
70	Mr. Jamil Ahmed Baloch	Arts (Painting, Sculpturing)	
71	Mr. Gulraiz Ghouri	Arts (Photography)	
72	Prof. Dr. Gul Rahim Khan	Arts (Archaeology & Numismatics)	
73	Dr. Asma Ibrahim	Arts (Archeology)	
74	Syed Ghalib Baqar	Arts (Painting)	
75	Mr. Ghulam Abbas Khaskheli	Arts (Egg Shell Painting)	
76	Mr. Mushtaque Ali Lashari	Arts (Painting)	
77	Mr. Bandah Ali	Arts (Folk Artist/Painting)	
78	Mr. Rahmatullah Khan	Arts (Photography)	
79	Dr. Khalid Bin Shaheen	ActingProduction	
80	Mr. Shahzad Rafique	Arts (Film Direction)	
81	Mr. Khan Shahnawaz Malhi	Arts (Painting)	
82	Mr. Muhammad Waseem	Arts (Calligraphy)	
83	Mr. A.S Rind	Arts (PaintingCalligraphy)	
84	Ms. Fizza Ali Meerza	Arts (ProductionScreen Writing)	
85	Mr. Amjad Sheikh	Arts (Film Production Distribution)	
86	Mr. Abdul Wasay Chaudhary	Arts (FilmDrama Acting)	
87	Mr. Farooq Hassan	Arts (Host)	
88	Mr. Misbah Uddin Qazi	Arts (Visual Arts)	
89	Dr. Aqeel Abbas Jafri	Literature (Poetry & Linguistics)	
90	Mr. Ali Dost Aajiz	Literature (Poetry/Writing)	
91	Mr. Anwer Sen Roy	Literature (Poetry/Writing)	
92	Dr. Mushtaq Ali Leghari	Literature (Poetry/Writing)	
93	Mr. Shams ul Qamar (Late)	Literature (Poetry/Writing)	
94	Dr. Muhammad Ismail	Literature (Writing)	
95	Prof. Dr. Abdul Saboor Baloch	Literature (Writing)	
96	Mr. Ahmed Ataullah	Literature (Poetry)	
97	Mr. Aziz Ijaz	Literature (Poetry)	
98	Mr. Ghulam Qadir Buzdar (Late)	Literature (Poetry)	
99	Mr. Muhammad Salim Shahzad	Literature	
100	Mr. Amjad Aziz Malik	Journalism	
101	Mr. Fahad Saleem Malik	Journalism (Media/Technology)	
102	Syed Naqi Haider Naqvi	Journalism	
103	Ms. Shama Junejo	Journalism	
104	Mr. Waqar Satti	Journalism	
105	Mr. Farooq Adil	Journalism	
106	Mr. Fahad Hussain	Journalism	
107	Mr. Iftikhar Ahmed	Journalism	
108	Mr. Usman Tajwar	Sports (Boxing)	
109	Ms. Ushna Sohail	Sports (Lawn Tennis)	
110	Mr. Danish Atlas	Sports (Squash)	
111	Ms. Farzana Shoaib	Social Services	
112	Syed FerozAlam Shah	Social Services	
113	Ms. Fadia Kashif	Social Services	
114	Molana Muhammad Maaz	Religious Scholar	
115	Moulana Khabeer Azad	Religious Scholar	
116	Lt. Col. Syed Maozzam Ali (Retd)	Public Service	
117	Syeda Arooba Bilal Hussain Gillani	Public Service	
118	Dr. Muhammad Salim Habib	Public Service	
119	Dr. Syed Saif ur Rehman	Public Service	
120	Mr. Fazal Karim Dadabhoy	Public Service	
121	Syed Zafar Abbas Jafri	Public Service	
122	Dr. Muhammad Quraish Khan	Public Service	
123	Mr. Abdul Rauf Baloch	Public Service	
124	Mr. Bashir Ahmed Bangulzai	Public Service	
125	Mr. Muhammad Imtiaz Buzdar	Public Service	
126	Mr. Amjad Hussain	Public Service	
127	Mr. Irfan Saleem	Public Service	
128	Mr. Saqib Sultan Al Mehmood	Public Service	
129	Mr. Ijaz Shafi Gillani	Public Service	
130	Mr. Musaddaq Zulqarnain	Public Service	
131	Mr. Muhammad Asif Jameel	Public Service	
132	Syed Murtaza Ali Shah	Public Service	
133	Mr. Muhammad Mushtaq	Public Service	
134	Mr. Farooq Mehboob	Public Service	
135	Ms. Aisha Khan	Public Service	
136	Mr. Basharat Mehmood Shehzad	Public Service	
137	Syed Rizwan Mahboob	Public Service	
138	Mr. Ali Tauqeer Shaikh	Public Service	
139	Mr. Afaq Ahmed Qureshi	Public Service	
140	Dr. Inayat Hussain	Public Service	
141	Mr. Hamed Yaqoob Sheikh	Public Service	
142	Mr. Rashid Mahmood Langrial	Public Service	
143	Mr. Zulfiqar Younas	Public Service	
144	Mr. Tanvir Butt	Public Service	
145	Mr. Asim Iftikhar Ahmad	Public Service	
146	Mr. Bilal Siddique Kamyana	Public Service	
147	Mr. Shamim Ashraf Khawaja	Public Service	
148	Mrs. Abida Malik	Public Service	
149	Mr. Zubair Ali	Public Service	
150	Haji Masood Parekh	Public Service	
151	Mr. Maqsood Ahmad	Public Service (Heritage Management)	
152	Ms. Sarah Ahmad	Public Service (Child Protection)	
153	Dr. Mimpal Singh	Public Service (Inter-faith harmony)	
154	Dr. Saud Anwar	Services to Pakistan	
155	Dr. Mukhayo Abdurakhmonova	Services to Pakistan	
156	Dr. Rizwana Chaudhary	Health (Gynecologist)	
157	Lt Col Muhammad Maaz Abaid	Pakistan Army	

=== 2024 ===
TBD.

#	Recipient	Field / Occupation	Ref.
1	TBD	TBD	

=== 2025 ===
TBD.

#	Recipient	Field / Occupation	Ref.
1	TBD	TBD	

=== 2026 ===
2026 recipients of the Sitara-i-Imtiaz
Recipient	Photo	Field of award	Country
Rukhsana Zuberi	—	Science (engineering)	Pakistan
Irfan Khoosat	—	Arts (performing arts)	Pakistan
Hadiqa Kiani	Hadiqa Kiani	Arts (singing)	Pakistan
Azra Aftab	—	Arts (television acting)	Pakistan
Samina Peerzada	Samina Peerzada	Arts (acting, direction and anchoring)	Pakistan
Fazila Qazi	—	Arts (performing arts)	Pakistan
Savera Nadeem	Savera Nadeem	Arts (acting)	Pakistan
Humaira Arshad	—	Arts (singing and anchoring)	Pakistan
Saira Naseem	—	Arts (singing)	Pakistan
Salima Hashmi	Salima Hashmi	Arts (painting, curating and art history)	Pakistan
Murtaza Barlas	—	Literature (poetry)	Pakistan
Yasmeen Hameed	—	Literature (poetry and editing)	Pakistan
Karrar Hussain	—	Literature (poetry and literary criticism)	Pakistan
Sana Mir	Sana Mir	Sports (cricket)	Pakistan
Haider Ali	—	Sports (discus throw)	Pakistan
Mohsin Nawaz	Mohsin Nawaz	Sports (shooting)	Pakistan
Sarmad Ali	—	Journalism	Pakistan
Shahjehan Syed Karim	—	Public service	Pakistan
Khurshid Ahmad Nadeem	—	Public service	Pakistan
Syed Deedar Hussain Shah	—	Public service	Pakistan
Shahab Uddin Khan	—	Public service	Pakistan
Rehan Zeb Khan	—	Public service	Pakistan
Frank Khalid	Frank Khalid	Services to Pakistan (overseas Pakistani)	United Kingdom
Ashraf Habibullah	Ashraf Habibullah	Services to Pakistan (overseas Pakistani)	United States

=== Tamgha-i-Imtiaz ===
- Yasmeen Dadabhoy — Education

- Dr. Naeem ul Haq Tariq (2026) – Professor of Metallurgy and Materials Engineering at the Pakistan Institute of Engineering and Applied Sciences (PIEAS); awarded for outstanding contributions to the field of engineering.

== See also ==
- Civil decorations of Pakistan
- Hilal-i-Imtiaz
