= Alghoza =

Woodwind instrument used in South Asia

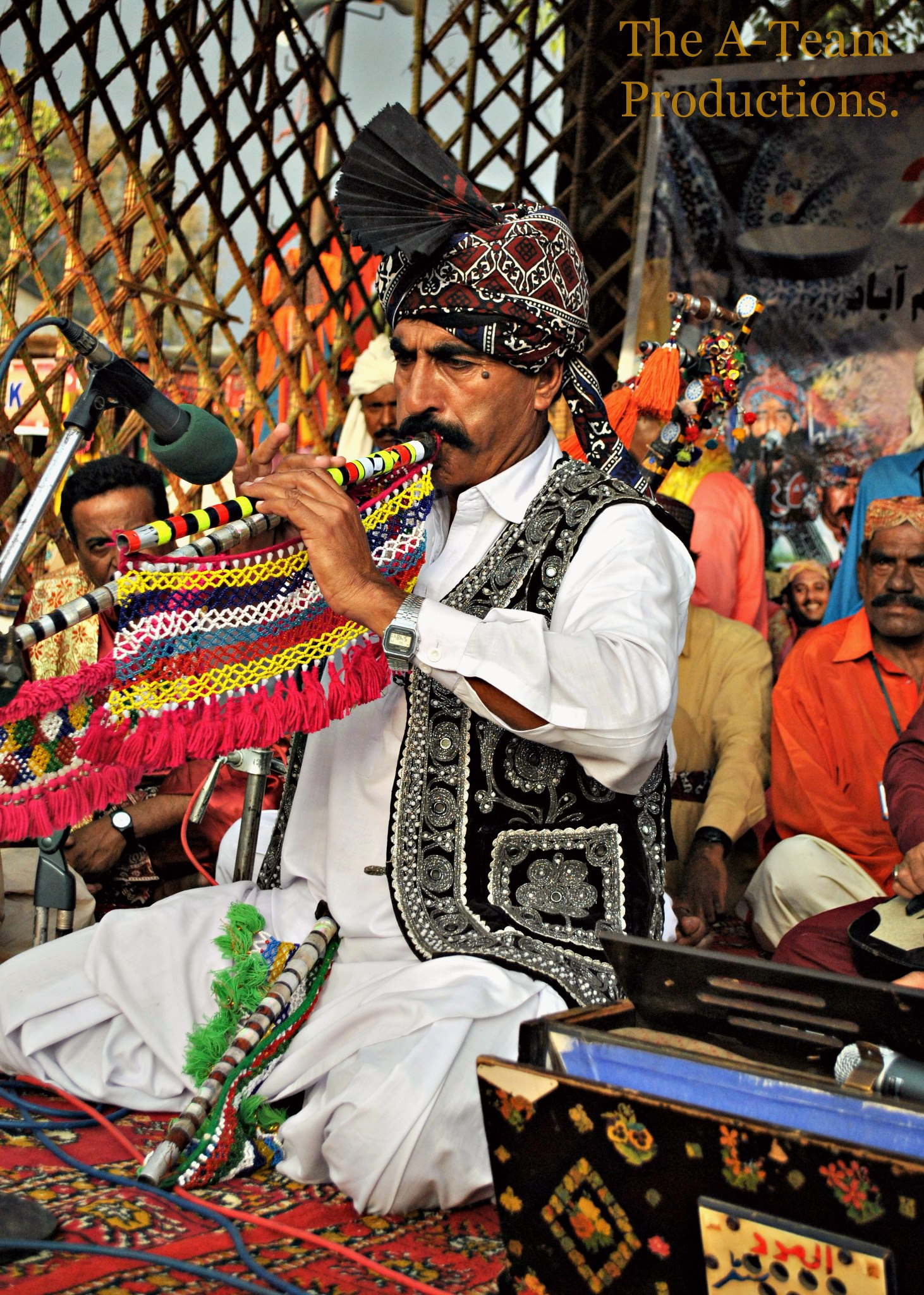
- Musician from Sindh, Pakistan playing alghoza

Woodwind
- Other names: Alghoze, Jōrhi, Pāwā Jōrhī, Do Nālī, Donāl, Girāw, Satārā or Nagōze
- Classification: Woodwind instrument
- Hornbostel–Sachs classification: 421.112
- Developed: around 7500 BC in Mesopotamia

Alghoza also called Beenon (Sindhi: الغوزو) is a paired woodwind traditional musical instrument of Sindhi culture, also used by Kutchi, Saraiki, Punjabi, Rajasthani and Baloch folk musicians. It consists of two joined beak flutes, one for melody, the second for drone. The flutes are either tied together or may be held together loosely with the hands. A continuous flow of air is necessary as the player blows into the two flutes simultaneously. The quick recapturing of breath on each beat creates a bouncing, swinging rhythm. The wooden instrument initially comprised two flute pipes of the same length but over time, one of them was shortened for sound purposes. In the world of alghoza playing, the two flute pipes are a couple — the longer one is the male and the shorter one the female instrument. With the use of beeswax, the instrument can be scaled to any tune.

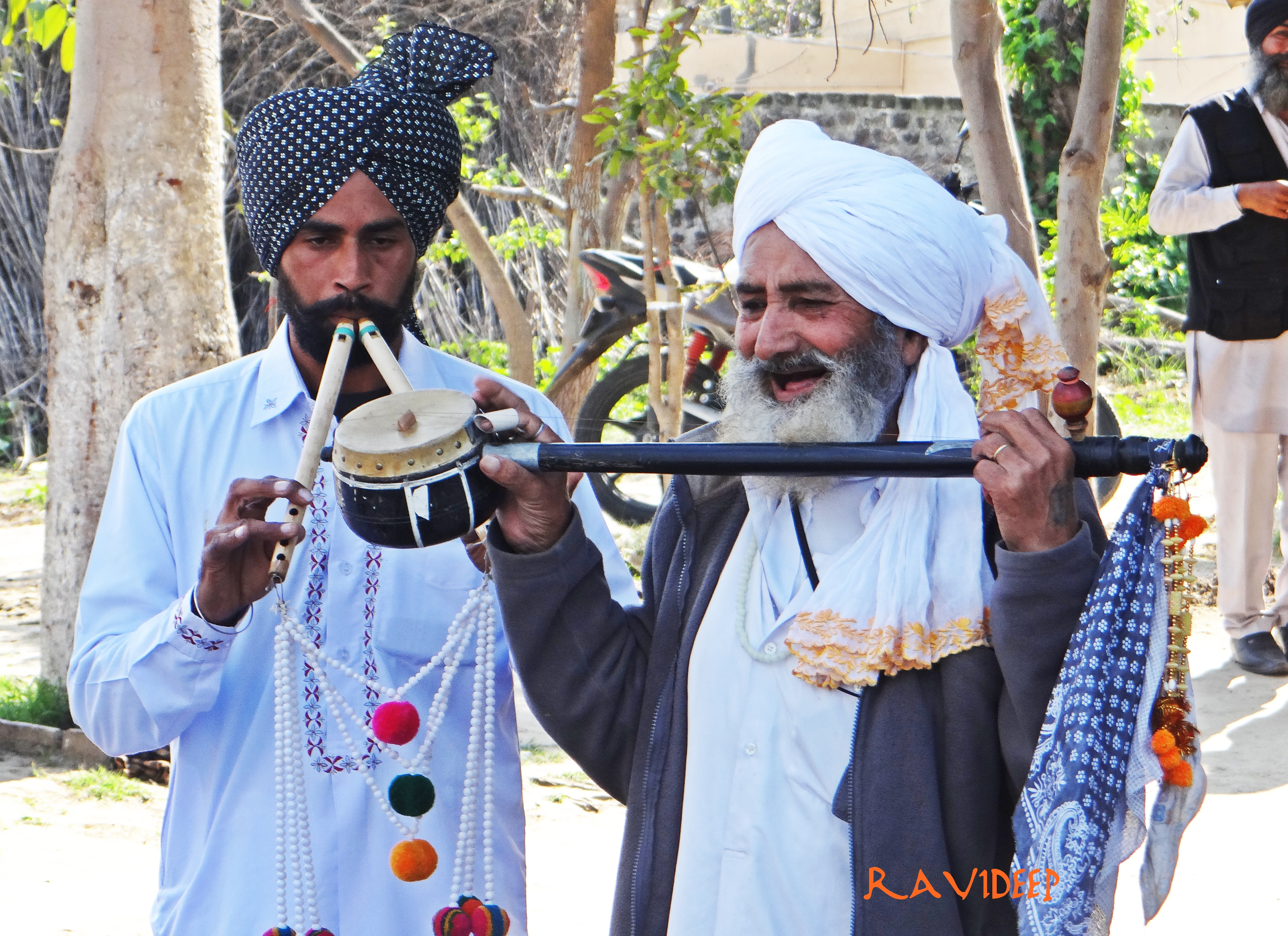
Toomba and alghoza players in Punjab, India

== Origin ==
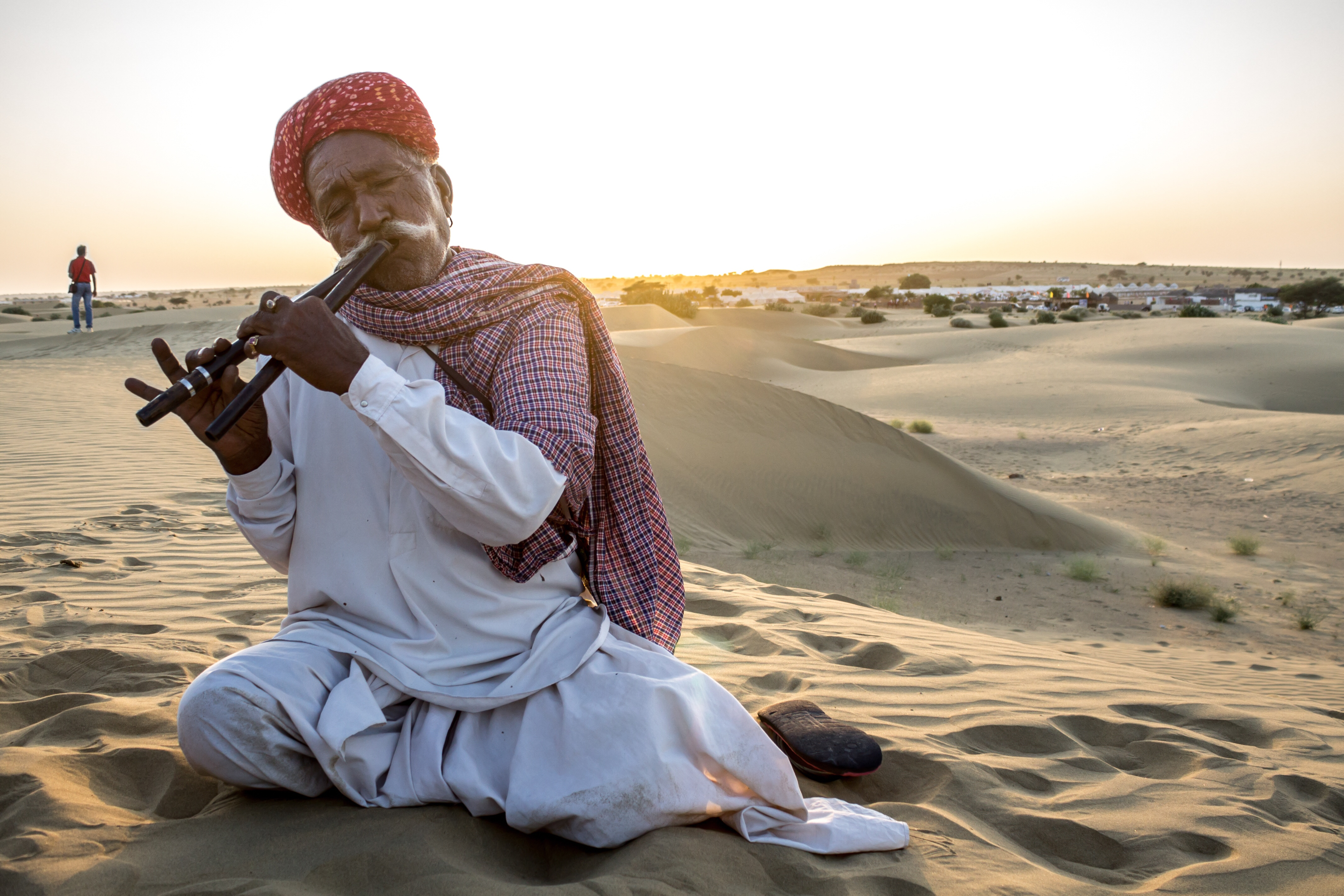
Alghoza player in the Thar Desert, Rajasthan, India

It originated at around 7500 BC in Mesopotamia, it then reached Iran and eventually the Indian subcontinent with some modifications. Some Mesopotamian archaic paintings contain a musical instrument very similar to alghoza.

In Mesopotamia, this instrument was called "Al-Joza", which literally means, "The dwin". As it reached the Indian subcontinent, the "J" in "Al-Joza" became "gh" and eventually the modified form of this instrument which reached the subcontinent came to be known as alghoza.

== Noted alghoza players ==
- Khamiso Khan
- Akbar Khamiso Khan
- Misri Khan Jamali
- Allah Bachayo Khoso
- Ustad Achar Samejo
- Gurmeet Bawa
