= Misri Khan Jamali =

Pakistani artist and Alghoza player

- Born: 1921; Rojhan Jamali, Jafarabad District, Balochistan, British India
- Died: 1982 (aged 60–61); Nawab Shah, Sindh, Pakistan
- Occupation: Instrumental musician (Alghoza player)
- Awards: Pride of Performance Award by the President of Pakistan in 1979

Misri Khan Jamali (Note: Urdu: مصری خان جمالی Balochi مِصری خان جمالی) (1982–1921) was a Pakistani artist and alghoza player from Pakistan.

== Early life and career ==
He was born in the village Rojhan Jamali in Jafarabad District, Balochistan in 1921. A member of the Jamali tribe, his family migrated to Nawabshah in Sindh. There he was trained in playing the alghoza by Murad Khan Jamali. He also performed on the alghoza at Radio Pakistan, Peshawar. He performed at Radio Pakistan events and programs for almost three decades.

He performed all over Pakistan as well as in many other countries, including the United Kingdom, Afghanistan, Singapore and Switzerland. His alghoza performances were recorded in different Sindhi classical melodies.

== Awards and recognition ==
- Pride of Performance Award in 1979 by the President of Pakistan.

== Death ==
He died at Nawabshah, Sindh, Pakistan in 1982.
