= Tando Muhammad Khan District =

Coordinates: 25°01′N 68°29′E

Tando Muhammad Khan District ٽنڊو محمد خان ضلعو ٹنڈو محمد خان ضلع
- District of Sindh
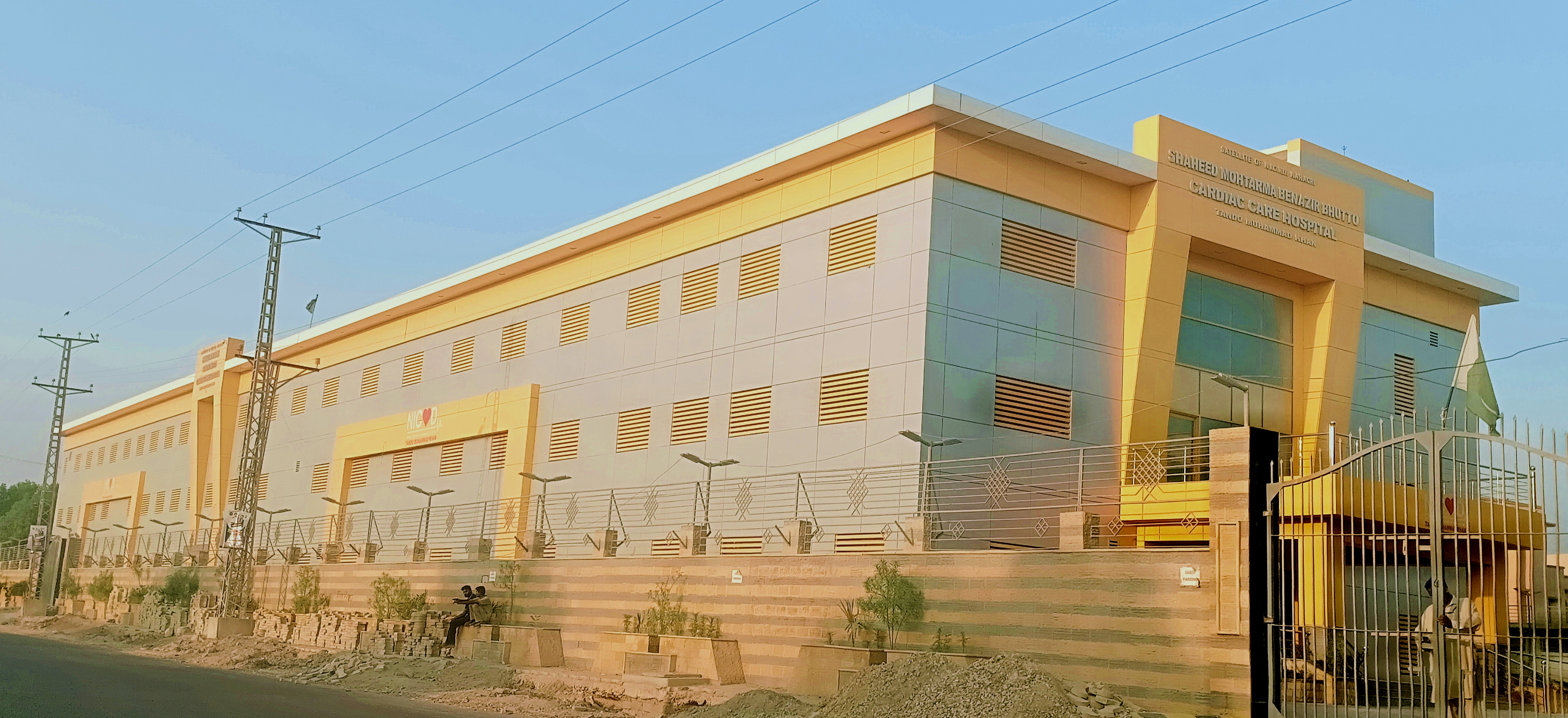
- National Institute of Cardiovascular Diseases (NICVD), Tando Muhammad Khan

- District Tando Muhammad Khan, Sindh, Pakistan
- Country: Pakistan
- Province: Sindh
- Division: Hyderabad
- District: Tando Muhammad Khan District
- Headquarters: Tando Muhammad Khan

Government
  - Type: District Administration
  - Deputy Commissioner: Dharmoon Bhawani
  - District Police Officer (DPO)/Senior Superintendent of Police (SSP): Abil Ali Baloch
  - District Health Officer: Dr Sadiq Ali Khowaja

Area
  - District of Sindh: 1,423 km^{2} (549 sq mi)

Population (2023)
  - District of Sindh: 726,119
  - Density: 510.3/km^{2} (1,322/sq mi)
  - Urban: 162,142
  - Rural: 563,977

Literacy
  - Literacy rate: Total: 34.02%; Male: 42.34%; Female: 25.02%
- Time zone: UTC+5 (PST)
- Number of Tehsils: 3

Tando Muhammad Khan District (Sindhi: ٽنڊو محمد خان ضلعو, Urdu: ٹنڈو محمد خان ضلع, a district located in the Sindh province of Pakistan.

Tando Muhammad Khan District spans an area of approximately 1,423 square kilometres. It shares its northern boundary with Hyderabad District and its north-eastern boundary with Tando Allahyar District. To the south and east-south, it is bordered by Badin District, while Thatta District lies to the west, north-west, and south-west. The district's landscape is predominantly flat, with a mix of agricultural land and small urban centres.

== History ==
The district is named after the city of Tando Muhammad Khan, founded by Mir Muhammad Khan Shahwani Talpur. It is located 35 km from Hyderabad on the Badin-Hyderabad National Highway.

Tando Muhammad Khan district was formed by dividing Hyderabad district along with Matiari and Tando Allahyar districts in 2005.

== Administration ==
The district is administratively divided into three tehsils:

Tehsil	Area (km²)	Pop. (2023)	Density (ppl/km²) (2023)	Literacy rate (2023)
Bulri Shah Karim Tehsil	770	247,027	320.81	27.15%
Tando Ghulam Hyder Tehsil	390	206,665	529.91	30.26%
Tando Muhammad Khan Tehsil	263	272,427	1,035.84	42.70%

Each tehsil is further subdivided into union councils, which manage local governance and community needs.

== Demography ==
Historical population
Year	Pop.	±% p.a.
1951		—
1961		—
1972		—
1981		—
1998	438,624	—
2017	677,098	+2.31%
2023	726,119	+1.17%

As of the 2023 census, Tando Muhammad Khan district has 143,798 households and a population of 726,119. The district has a sex ratio of 107.84 males to 100 females and a literacy rate of 34.02%: 42.34% for males and 25.02% for females. 223,312 (30.76% of the surveyed population) are under 10 years of age. 162,142 (22.33%) live in urban areas.

Religions in Tando Muhammad Khan district (2023)
Religion	Percent
Islam	75.56%
Hinduism	23.98%
Other or not stated	0.46%

Religion in contemporary Tando Muhammad Khan District
Religious group	1941 (Note: 1941 census data is for part of Guni taluka in Hyderabad district, which roughly corresponds to the present district. Religion figures were calculated using the 1951 figures for population of current Tando Muhammad Khan district compared to the present district.)		2017		2023	
Religious group	Pop.	%	Pop.	%	Pop.	%
Islam	59,829	78.26%	524,945	77.53%	548,489	75.56%
Hinduism	16,360	21.40%	150,653	22.25%	174,105	23.98%
Sikhism	248	0.32%	—N/a	—N/a	7	~0%
Christianity	13	0.03%	1,372	0.20%	2,179	0.30%
Others (Note: Including Jainism, Christianity, Buddhism, Zoroastrianism, Judaism, Ad-Dharmis, or not stated)	0	~0%	128	0.02%	1,143	0.16%
Total Population	76,450	100%	677,098	100%	725,923	100%

Population by mother tongue (2023)
1. Sindhi (93.5%)
2. Hindko (2.01%)
3. Urdu (1.40%)
4. Others (3.07%)

At the time of the 2023 census, 93.54% of the population spoke Sindhi, 2.01% Hindko and 1.40% Urdu as their first language.

== Health ==
National Institute of Cardiovascular Diseases (NICVD) opened its satellite centre in Tando Mohammad Khan, it became the 4th city to have such facility in Sindh province. The facility would provide cardiac treatment services to people of Thatta, Badin, Tharparkar and adjoining areas, as well. People of this area could not even travel to Karachi for treatment of cardiac ailments but now they could avail state of the art cardiac treatment closer to their abodes. In Sindh, around 30,000 to 40,000 children are born with congenital heart disease or with defective hearts at the time of birth, but only a few hundred of them are diagnosed and get treated while thousands remain undiagnosed due to non-availability of heart health facilities in their area. In particular, from Tando Muhammad Khan to Thatta, Badin, Tharparkar and adjoining areas, thousands of children are born with congenital heart disease but they remain undiagnosed throughout their life and eventually die without treatment.

== Climate ==
The climate of the area is moderate. However. April, May and June are very hot during the day time. December and January are the coldest months with maximum and minimum temperatures of 30 °C and 10 °C respectively. Rainfall is highly erratic with an average of about 130 mm. The monsoon dominates from July to September.

== Agriculture ==
70% of the district population is engaged in agriculture. Main crops grown in the district are: sugarcane, rice, wheat and cotton. Phuleli, Pinyari and Akram canal are the main source of water-reservoir for irrigation in this district. There are many rice mills operating in Tando Mohammad khan district.

According to the 2017 census of Pakistan, the population of Tando Muhammad Khan District of Sindh was 677228: 350010 male, 327202 female, and 16 transgender. Average annual growth rate was 2.31% from 1998 to 2017.

== Education ==
District Tando Muhammad Khan is ranked at the 115th position in the education score index of the Pakistan District Education Rankings 2017 published by Alif Ailaan. The education score comprises the learning score, retention score and gender parity score. Retention is one of the biggest concerns in this district, with the relevant score being only 31.14 out of a potential 100.

In the middle school infrastructure score index, which focuses on availability of basic facilities and the building condition of schools, Tando Muhammad Khan ranks 86th. The lack of electricity and drinking water in schools remain a concern in the district, along with unsatisfactory building conditions.

On the TaleemDo! App, residents of several areas within Tando Muhammad Khan have complained about the quality of the syllabus and outdated textbooks. In government schools, where textbooks are supposed to be provided to every child free of cost, parents have complained of being charged for these items. The debate over the medium of instruction is as relevant in Tando Muhammad Khan as other districts of Sindh, where many demand for basic education to be provided in Sindhi, rather than in Urdu or English.

== List of Union Councils ==
Tando Muhammad Khan District has the following 17 Union Councils:

UC Name	Population		
T.M. Khan-1	28,085		
T.M. Khan-2	26,451		
T.M. Khan-3	27,444	T.M. KHAN-4	25999(RAJO NIZAMANI)
Lakhat	29,853		
Tando Siandad	35,054		
Shaikh Bhirkio	28,543		
Bulri Shah Karim	33,437		
Saeed Khan Lund	30,252		
Allah Yar Turk	27,022		
Saeed Pur	26,514		
Mulla Katiar	27,930		
Saeed Matto	29,577		
Jhanhan Soomro	32,096		
Tando Ghulam Hyder	33,264		
Dando	31,826		
Ghulam Shah Baghrani	29,035		
Nazar Pur	32,315		

== List of Dehs ==
The following is a list of Tando Muhammad Khan District's dehs, organised by taluka:

- Tando Ghulam Hyder Taluka (54 dehs)
  - Adhanki
  - Ahmedani
  - Ajaib Pur
  - Arazi
  - Bariji
  - Bhanki
  - Chachri
  - Chak
  - Chandia
  - Charo
  - Choubandi
  - Dando
  - Dauki
  - Debgeri
  - Doderi
  - Fateh Bagh
  - Gulshan
  - Habach
  - Jagsiyani
  - Jahbgeri
  - Jarki
  - Jiayath
  - Jio
  - Jonathi
  - Joon
  - Jumoon Jakhro
  - Karo Mehro
  - Kath Bhambhen
  - Khaso
  - Kodario
  - Kor Rahimoon
  - Lakara
  - Lakhi
  - Lashari
  - Machari
  - Mahi Laghari
  - Malana
  - Malook Pur
  - Moya
  - Nazar Pur
  - Noohani
  - Palandi
  - Parori
  - Peroz Pur
  - Ringyoon
  - Saherki
  - Samradi
  - Seri
  - Sethari
  - Tando Ghulam Hyder
  - Tali
  - Thorki
  - Unerki
  - Vedho Chowro
- Tando Muhammad Khan Taluka (29 dehs)
  - Abri
  - Baberki
  - Bozdar
  - Burira
  - Chano Katiar
  - Digh
  - Fatehpur
  - Kari
  - Khanto
  - Kora
  - Lakhat
  - Larh
  - Nango Shah
  - Pad Ram Diyali
  - Patghahi
  - Pattar
  - Ram Diyali Wasan
  - Roshnai
  - Samabani
  - Shah Bukhari
  - Sheikh Bhirkhio
  - Siddiquepur
  - Singh
  - Soomerki
  - Sutiari
  - Tando Muhammad Khan
  - Thari
  - Vesarki
  - Veseria
- Bulri Shah Karim Tehsil (76 dehs)
  - Abad
  - Abdumehndo
  - Alipur
  - Allo Katiar
  - Amerki
  - Aripota
  - Barchani
  - Beharan
  - Behranpur
  - Bhahera
  - Bhalal
  - Bhanbri
  - Bulri
  - Chaudaro
  - Chhari
  - Chorki Jagir
  - Dadoonki
  - Deghi
  - Dhandaboo
  - Dhandhi
  - Dhatt
  - Daharki
  - Din Pur
  - Dodi
  - Doulatpur
  - Ganghyari
  - Hajipur
  - Heran Jagir
  - Homki
  - Jado Laghari
  - Jalalani
  - Jamerki
  - Jati
  - Jhok
  - Kamaro
  - Kandar
  - Kass
  - Kathor
  - Katiar
  - Keenjhar
  - Khadho
  - Khalasi
  - Khalso
  - Kheersar
  - Khiyari
  - Khokhar
  - Khoski
  - Kolab Rayatee
  - Kumb
  - Ladhan
  - Loonlelo
  - Meeranpur
  - Nakurji
  - Narki
  - Pakhro
  - Pakhyarki
  - Pir Wah
  - Qaboolpur
  - Qaboolpur-II
  - Qanadani
  - Rain
  - Rayati Shor
  - Saidpur
  - Sahrani
  - Samejani
  - Samepotani
  - Sandki
  - Sathiar
  - Shorki
  - Sonehri
  - Soomerki
  - Soomra
  - Soorjani
  - Sun
  - Tikhar
  - Umaid Ali Jat

== Bibliography ==
http://www.ndma.gov.pk/Publications/Development%20Profile%20District%20Tando%20Muhammad%20Khan.pdf

- 1998 District census report of Hyderabad. Census publication. Vol. 59. Islamabad: Population Census Organization, Statistics Division, Government of Pakistan. 1999.
