= Bulri Shah Karim =

Coordinates: 24.863°N 68.331°E

Bulri Shah Karim (Sindhi:بلڙي شاھ ڪريم) is a town and the taluka headquarter of Tando Muhammad Khan District, Sindh, Pakistan. It is named after the Sindhi language poet Shah Abdul Karim Bulri. The town currently holds the status of a town committee.
