= Tando Muhammad Khan =

Pakistani town

Tando Muhammad Khan: ٹنڈو محمد خان; ٽنڊو محمد خان
- City
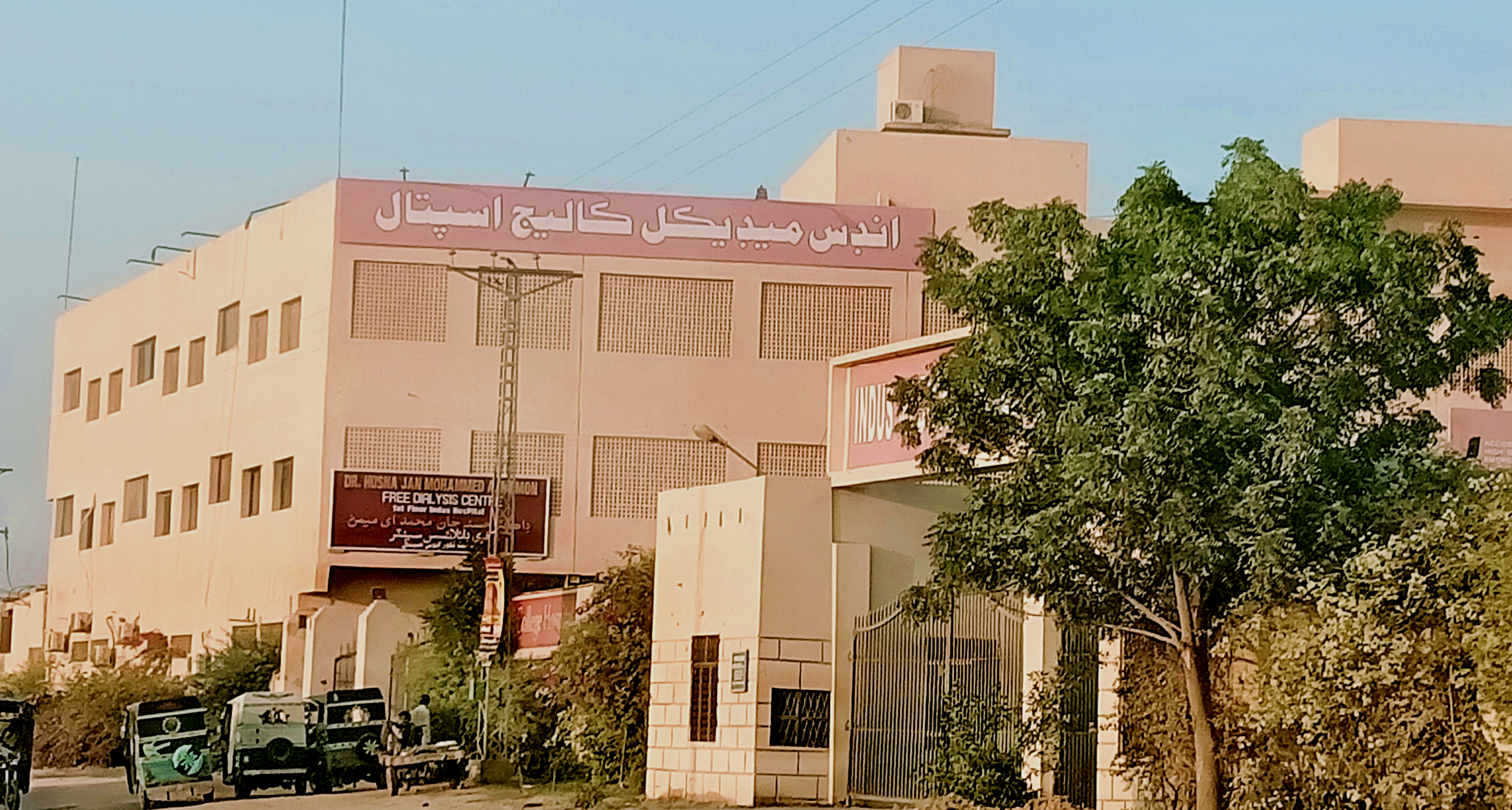
- Indus Medical College and Hospital

- Location within Sindh Location within Pakistan
- Coordinates: 25°7′26″N 68°32′20″E
- Country: Pakistan
- Province: Sindh
- Division: Hyderabad
- District: Tando Muhammad Khan

Government
  - Type: Municipal Committee
  - Chairman: Shahnawaz Mohsin
  - Vice Chairman: Abdul Karim
- Elevation: 11 m (36 ft)

Population (2023 census)
  - City: 114,406
  - Rank: 110th in Pakistan
- Time zone: UTC+5 (PST)
- Calling code: 022
- Number of towns: 3
- Number of Union councils: 16

Tando Muhammad Khan (Sindhi: ٽنڊو محمد خان; Urdu: ٹنڈو محمد خان) is a city and headquarter of the Tando Muhammad Khan District located in Sindh, Pakistan. It is named after Mir Muhammad Khan Talpur Shahwani.

It is the 110th populous city of Pakistan, according to the 2023 census. It has a railway station on the Badin–Hyderabad Branch Line.

== History ==
Tando Muhammad Khan was founded by Mir Muhammad Khan Talpur, who died in 1813.

During the British period, it was a seat of assistant collector. Its status was changed to Municipality in 1856. Tando Muhammad Khan was carved out of Hyderabad district in April 2005 by then adviser chief minister of Sindh, Mir Ali Nawaz Khan Talpur. Syed, Bukharis, Mirs and Nizamanis are prominent families in Tando Mohammad Khan, highly active in the politics of Tando Mohammad Khan for centuries.

== Economy ==
There are four sugar mills in Tando Mohammad Khan city, namely: Ansari Sugar Mills, Faran Sugar Mills, Shahmurad Sugar Mills, Sindh Abadgar's Sugar Mills, and around dozen of rice mills which provide employment to the local people on seasonal bases. The mills are located on the outskirts of the city. Traditional shawls called "Ajrak" is among the most famous Sindhi culture wearing is also produced in Tando Muhammad Khan.

== Location ==
The town is located at 25°8′N and 68°32′E at an elevation of 11 metres on the right bank of Fuleli canal (old name of Fuleli was Gooni) at distance of 21 miles from Hyderabad. There are 8 police stations in District T.M. Khan which are PS Tando Muhammad Khan, PS Bulri Shah Karim, PS Abadgar, PS Taluka, PS Sheikh Burkio, PS Moya, PS Tando Ghulam Haider and PS Mullakatiar. Taluka Tando Ghulam Hyder consists of Four Union Council

- Tando Ghulam Hyder (main)
- Nazarpur
- Ghulam Shah Bagrani
- Dandies

Union Council Nazarpur consists of Markaz which are given below.

- Jagsyani. jagsi Muslim Community political background and this Community belongs to agriculture as (Landlord) the jagsi Community consists on village
- Wahid Dino Jagsi
- Haji Karmillah Jagsi
- Abdul Rehman Jagsi
- Ghulam Mustafa Jagsi
- Mohammad Haroon Jagsi

== Demographics ==
=== Population ===
Historical population
Year	Pop.	±% p.a.
1951	10,735	—
1961	15,536	+3.77%
1972	39,003	+8.73%
1981	41,757	+0.76%
1998	65,396	+2.67%
2017	101,863	+2.36%
2023	114,406	+1.95%

According to 2023 census, Tando Muhammad Khan had a population of 114,406.

People of various background coexist here peacefully. Majority of population consists of Sindhi people, along with other ethnic groups such as Urdu speaking, Kolli, Kutchi, Memon etc. All villages are surrounding in the area of Tando Ghulam Hyder union council Nazarpur markaz Jagsyani whole Jagsi Muslim Sunni Community are well-educated communities that are 500 years older living at District Tando Muhammad Khan Taluka Tando Ghulam Hyder.

The taluka headquarters Tando Ghulam Hyder was created in 2005 by Arbab Ghulam Rahim Chief Minister Sindh.

There are different communities living in taluka H/Q Tando Ghulam Hyder for instance:kolachi Community, Bhatti Community, Waryah Community, Peer, Sheedi, Khaskheli, Kunbhar and Kathbabhan. Whereas Bhatti community is a well-educated family in Tando Ghulam Hyder and Waryah community is related with agriculture and trade.

=== Languages ===
Languages of Tando Muhammad Khan MC (2023 Census)
1. Sindhi (85.4%)
2. Urdu (7.30%)
3. Punjabi (2.10%)
4. Pashto (1.70%)
5. Hindko (1.30%)
6. Others (2.20%)

Sindhi is the predominantly spoken in TMK as well as Urdu is the also spoken and understood by the residents TMK city. Both are understood and spoken universally.

Nearby large cities	Distance in miles
Hyderabad	21 miles(35 kilometers)
Badin (Pakistan)	30 miles (50 kilometers)
Karachi	124 miles (168 kilometers)

== See also ==
- Rajo Nizamani
