= NA-222 Badin-I =

Constituency of the National Assembly of Pakistan

- Constituency for the National Assembly of Pakistan
- Region: Matli, Talhar Tehsils and Tando Bago Tehsil (partly) of Badin District
- Electorate: 471,595

Current constituency
- Party: Pakistan People's Party
- Member(s): Mir Ghulam Ali Talpur
- Created from: NA-224 Badin-I

NA-222 Badin-I (این اے-222، بدين-1) is a constituency for the National Assembly of Pakistan. The constituency was known as NA-224 (Badin-I) prior to 2018, the delimitation of 2018 changed it to NA-229 (Badin-I).

== Assembly Segments ==
Constituency number	Constituency	District	Current MPA	Party
68	PS-68 Badin-I	Badin District	Muhammad Halepoto	PPP
69	PS-69 Badin-II	Badin District	Allah Bux Talpur	PPP

== Members of Parliament ==
=== 2018–2023: NA-229 Badin-I ===
Election	Member	Party
2018	Mir Ghulam Ali Talpur	PPPP

=== 2024–present: NA-222 Badin-I ===
Election	Member	Party
2024	Mir Ghulam Ali Talpur	PPPP

== Election 2002 ==
General elections were held on 10 October 2002. Ghulam Ali Nizamani of PPP won by 70,231 votes.

General election 2002: NA-224 Badin-I
Party	Candidate	Votes	%	±%
PPP	Ghulam Ali Nizamani	70,231	50.52	
Independent	Muhammad Akram Nizamani	65,904	47.41	
Others	Others (seven candidates)	2,878	2.07	
Turnout		141,595	38.88	
Total valid votes		139,013	98.18	
Rejected ballots		2,582	1.82	
Majority		4,327	3.11	
Registered electors		364,228		

== Election 2008 ==
General elections were held on 18 February 2008. Ghulam Ali Nizamani of PPP won by 87,102 votes.

General election 2008: NA-224 Badin-I
Party	Candidate	Votes	%	±%
PPP	Ghulam Ali Nizamani	87,102	66.99	
PML(F)	Ali Akber Nizamani	37,369	28.74	
Others	Others (nine candidates)	5,543	4.27	
Turnout		138,742	34.23	
Total valid votes		130,014	93.71	
Rejected ballots		8,728	6.29	
Majority		49,733	38.25	
Registered electors		405,284		
PPP hold				

== Election 2013 ==
General elections were held on 11 May 2013. Sardar Kamal Khan of PPP won by 128,723 votes

General election 2013: NA-224 Badin-I
Party	Candidate	Votes	%	±%
PPP	Sardar Kamal Khan Chang	128,723	64.86	
PML(F)	Ali Asghar Halepoto	56,037	28.24	
Others	Others (fifteen candidates)	13,694	6.90	
Turnout		206,982	56.66	
Total valid votes		198,454	95.88	
Rejected ballots		8,528	4.12	
Majority		72,686	36.62	
Registered electors		365,308		
PPP hold				

== Election 2018 ==
General elections were held on 25 July 2018.

General election 2018: NA-229 Badin-I
Party	Candidate	Votes	%	±%
PPP	Mir Ghulam Ali Talpur	96,977	49.66	
GDA	Muhammad Hassam Mirza	81,828	41.91	
Others	Others (five candidates)	16,460	8.43	
Turnout		203,443	52.96	
Total valid votes		195,265	95.98	
Rejected ballots		8,178	4.02	
Majority		15,149	7.75	
Registered electors		384,150		
PPP hold		Swing	N/A	

== Election 2024 ==
Elections were held on 8 February 2024. Mir Ghulam Ali Talpur one the election with 113,989 votes.

General election 2024: NA-222 Badin-I
Party	Candidate	Votes	%	±%
PPP	Mir Ghulam Ali Talpur	113,989	57.04	▲7.38
GDA	Mir Hussain Bux Talpur	67,011	33.53	▼8.38
Others	Others (thirteen candidates)	18,827	9.42	
Turnout		211,666	44.88	▼8.08
Total valid votes		199,827	94.41	
Rejected ballots		11,839	5.59	
Majority		46,978	23.51	▲15.76
Registered electors		471,595		
PPP hold				

== See also ==
- NA-221 Tando Muhammad Khan
- NA-223 Badin-II
