= PS-69 Badin-II =

Constituency of the Provincial Assembly of Sindh, Pakistan

- Constituency for the Provincial Assembly of Sindh
- Region: Matli Tehsil (partly), Tando Bago Tehsil (partly) and Talhar Tehsil of Badin District
- Electorate: 195,864

Current constituency
- Member: Vacant
- Created from: PS-56 Badin-II (2002-2018); PS-71 Badin-II (2018-2023)

PS-69 Badin-II (پی ایس-69، بدین-2) is a constituency of the Provincial Assembly of Sindh.

== General elections 2024 ==
Provincial election 2024: PS-69 Badin-II
Party	Candidate	Votes	%	±%
PPP	Allah Bux Talpur	38,759	48.57	
GDA	Mir Abdullah Khan	33,378	41.82	
PTI	Nawab Abu Bakar Talpur (Note: Filed nomination papers as PTI candidate but ECP allowed him to run as an Independent)	2,583	3.24	
Independent	Mir Shahid Ahmed Khan	1,021	1.28	
Independent	Devdat	822	1.03	
Others	Others (thirteen candidates)	3,245	4.06	
Turnout		84,900	43.35	
Total valid votes		79,808	94.00	
Rejected ballots		5,092	6.00	
Majority		5,381	6.75	
Registered electors		195,864		
PPP hold				

== General elections 2018 ==
Provincial election 2018: PS-71 Badin-II
Party	Candidate	Votes	%	±%
PPP	Mir Allah Bux Talpur	38,550	48.95	
GDA	Mir Abdullah Khan Talpur	33,047	41.96	
MMA	Ghulam Mustafa	3,439	4.37	
PTI	Nawab Abu Bakar Talpur	1,471	1.87	
Independent	Mir Ghulam Shah	923	1.17	
Independent	Mir Yar Muhammad	349	0.44	
Independent	Muhammad Hassan Jamali	188	0.24	
Independent	Ghulam Ali Nizamani	184	0.23	
Independent	Zaffar Ali	177	0.22	
Independent	Abdul Aziz Jamali	121	0.15	
Independent	Mir Irfan Talpur	112	0.14	
Independent	Shabir Ahmed Jammali	74	0.09	
Independent	Mir Ghulam Rasool	52	0.07	
Independent	Shahjahan Shah	37	0.05	
Independent	Nadir Hussain Khuwaja	37	0.05	
Majority		5,503	6.99	
Valid ballots		78,761		
Rejected ballots		5,003		
Turnout		83,764		
Registered electors		159,817		
hold				

== General elections 2013 ==
Contesting candidates	Party affiliation	Votes polled

== General elections 2008 ==
Contesting candidates	Party affiliation	Votes polled

== See also ==
- PS-68 Badin-I
- PS-70 Badin-III
