= Bhoongar I =

Sardar of Sindh from 1054 to 1068

Bhungar I Soomro
- Assamuddin

3rd Sardar of Soomra dynasty
- Reign: 1054–1068
- Predecessor: Sardar Soomar
- Successor: Dodo I
- Born: 1015
- Died: 1068 (aged 52–53); Thari, Badin, Sultanate of Sindh (present-day Sindh, Pakistan)
- Issue: Dodo I
Names
- Asimuddin Bhungar I bin Khafif I Soomro
- House: House of Soomar
- Dynasty: Soomra dynasty
- Father: Khafif I
- Mother: unknown (Daughter of Arab Chieftain Sa'd)
- Religion: Shia Islam

Assamuddin Bhoongar I (Sindhi: عصام الدين ڀونگر اول, romanized: Āssamuddīn Bhūngar Awal; Persian pronunciation: [aːs̤ɪm'ʊd'iːɳ bʱuːŋgər əwəl], born Assamuddin Bhungar I bin Khafif I bin Rao Soomar Soomro (Sindhi: عصام الدين ڀونگر اول بن خفيف اول بن راؤ سومر سومرو), was the 3rd Sardar of Sindh. He ruled from 1054, when his uncle Soomar Soomro died issueless, till his own death in 1068. Bhungar is credited with establishing Soomra dominance throughout Sindh. He was succeeded by either his son, Dodo I.

== Biography ==
Assamuddin Bhungar I (also spelled Bhungar Soomro; born 1053 – died 1068) was the son of Khafif Soomro. His mother, though her name is not known, was the daughter of the powerful Arab chieftain Sa'd.

He succeeded his father to the hereditary states and ruled actively. He was the father of Dodo I, also known as Samsam al-Dawla Dodo, and the grandfather of Zainab Tari.

== Bibliography ==
- Panhwar, M. H. (2003). An Illustrated Historical Atlas of Soomra Kingdom of Sindh (1011–1351 AD). Soomra National Council, Pakistan.
- Siddiqui, Habibullah. "The Soomras of Sindh: their origin, main characteristics and rule – an overview (general survey) (1025 – 1351 AD)" (PDF). University of Karachi.
