= Shah Lutufullah Qadri =

17th-century Sindhi poet Saint

- شاھ لطف الله قادري

Personal life
- Born: 1611 CE, 911 Hijri Agham Kot, Talka Matli ( Now,, Badin)Sindh, Mughal Dynasty (now Sindh, Pakistan)
- Died: 1669 CE (aged 84) Sindh, Mughal Dynasty (now Sindh, Pakistan)
- Main interest(s): Sindhi and Persian poetry
- Notable work: منھاج المعرف

Religious life
- Religion: Islam
- Movement: Qadriya

Shah Lutufullah Qadri (Sindhi: شاھ لطف الله قادري), was a great saint of his era. He was not only a saint of Qadriya lineage but Sindhi and Persian language poet too. He was born in small village Agham Kot, Talka Matli, (now district Badin) during Mughal Dynasty ruled over Sindh.

== Poetry ==
هي جي فاني ٿئا ي الله ۾، موٽن تن محال

اُن وڃائي وجود کي حاصل ڪيو حال

تني سندو قال، اتانگھان اتانگھ ٿيو

== See also ==
- Shah Inayat Shaheed
