= Lari dialect (Sindhi) =

Dialect of Sindhi

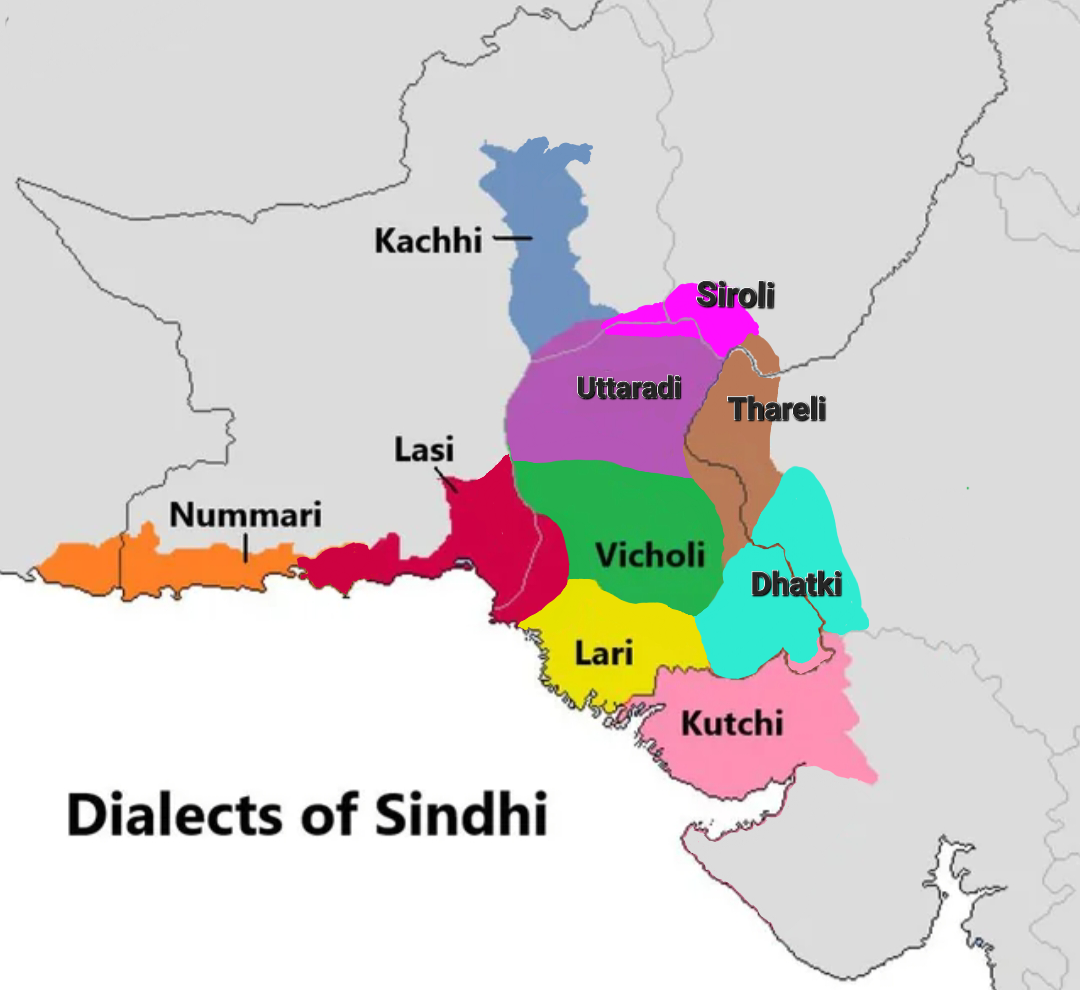
Map of Sindhi dialects, with Lari in yellow

Lari (Sindhi: لاڙي) is a dialect of the Sindhi language, which is spoken by the people living in "Laar" region of Sindh, and the dialect of this region is called "Lari". The term Lari is also used for anything which is related to Larr (Region), like people, food, rituals, traditions, dress etc. The areas along the Indus River and its estuary are called "Larr". Larr means the sloping or lower part, which seems to go with the sea. In Larr, From Badin, Tando Bago, Bulri Sharif, Sujawal, Thatta and Karachi parts are included in Laar. The local dialect is called Lari dialect. Shah Abdul Latif's Risalo, Shah Karim's book, etc. are written in this dialect.

In the Lari dialect the accent, some vocabulary is different, it is closely related to lasi, Kohistani and kutchi dialects of Sindhi, Lari preserves ancient peculiarities that do not appear in the standard dialect. The most important of these are the disaspiration of sonant aspirates, and the frequent change of cerebral r to dental r. It is well known that in the Lari, the "dr" and "tr" of central and northern Sindh become "d" and "t" respectively. Examples are té for tre (three), put for putr (a son), dõk for drõk: and dõr for dror (run), chand for chandr (the moon) digõ for drigho (tall). The vowels (letters with h accent) should be dropped, Instead of "Digho" they say "Digo" as Shah Sahib says: "Sariyan kana swar mei shakti tuan takh" (”ساريان ڪانہ سوير ۾ طاقت توهان ڌار“ ) in this way they also use the endings in a unique way.

== See also ==
- Sindhi language
- Sindhi languages
- Larr (Region)

== Sample Comparison ==
List of words peculiar to lari dialect of Sindhi.

abhu (heavens, air), ãțō (an embrace, turn, return, dispute), ayal (mother, mamma (a term of endearment), bbijo (second, another), bhatu (a scorpion), bhatuari (a small scorpion), bhiranu (to meet; to mix, mingle) bhitao (property, goods and chattels) dduãr (illnesses, sickness, disease) jjērō (fire) juhārō "m" Juhārī "f" (the visit paid to newly married couple after honeymoon) laī (a female friend or equal; a term of affection used in addressing a female) liphōtī (a coverlet, quilt) machhun "interj"(God forbid) nāiru (a coconut) nīghō (a boy, lad), phutiro (clean, nice, elegant) wahalō (quickly, speedily), wahurō (rich, wealthy), wanaharō (a bridegroom) etc.

Word comparison in different Sindhi dialects:
English	Lari	Vicholi	Uttaradi	Lasi	Kutchi
I	Aao(n)	Aao(n)	Maa(n)	Ã	Aau(n)
My	Mujo	Muhnjo	Mahjo/Manjo	Majo/Mojo	Mujo
You "Sin, plu" (formal)	Aa(n)/Aei(n)	Awha(n)/Awhee(n) Tawha(n)/Tawhee(n)	Taha(n)/ Tahee(n)/Ta(n)	Awa(n)/Ai(n)	Ai(n)
What	Kujaro/Kujja	Chha/Kahirō	Chha/Shha	Chho	Kuro
Why	Ko	Chho	Chho/Shho	Chhela	Kolai/Kurelae
How	Kei(n)	Kiya(n)	Kiya(n)		Kee(n)
Foot	Pagg/Pagulo	Pair	Pair	Pair	Pag
To wash	Dhun(u)	Dhoain(u)	Dhuan(u)		
Far	Ddoor	Pare	Pare	Ddor	Chhete
Near	Vejo/Ōdō/Ōdirō/Ore	Vejhō	Vejhō/Vejhe	Ōddō	Wat
Good/Excellent	Khaso/Sutho/Thauko	Sutho	Sutho/Bhalo/Chango	Khasho	khaso/Laat
High	Ucho	Utāho	Mathe	Ucho	Ucho
Silver	Chadi/Rupo	Rupo	Chandi	Rupo	Rupo
Father	Pay/Abo/Aba/Ada	Piu	Pee/Babo/Pirhe(n)	Pe	Pe/Bapa/Ada
Wife	Joe/Wani/kuwar	Joe/Gharwari	Zaal/Gharwari	Zaal	Vahu/Vau
Man	Māņu/Mārū/Mard /Murs/Musaloo	Mardu	Manhu/Bhai/Musalo /Kako/Hamra	Mānhu	Māḍū/Mārū
Woman	Zala/ōrat/ōlath	Aurat	Mai/Ran	Zala	Bāeḍi/Bāyaḍī
Child/Baby	Bbar/Ningar/Gabhur /Kako	Bbar/Ningar/Balak	Bbar/Bacho/Adro/ Phar (animal)	Gabhar	Bar/Gabhar
Daughter	Dia/Niyani/Kañā	Dhiu/Niyani	Dhee/Adri	Dhia	Dhi
Sun	Sij/Sūrij	Siju	Sijhu	Siju	Sūraj
Cat	Bili/Pusani	Billi	Billi	Phushini	Minni
Rain	Varsat/Mai(n)	Barsat/Mee(n)h /Barish	Barsat/Mee(n)h		Varsat
And	Ãū(n)/Ãē(n)/Nē	Aēi(n)	Aēi(n)/Aū(n)	Ãē/Or	Nē/Anē
Is	Aye	Ahe	Aa/Ahe/Hai	Ahe/Aye	Aye
Sunlight	Karo		Oosa		Tarke
Slap	Tarr	Thaparr/Chammat	Chamatu/Lapatu/ Thapu		
I went	Au(n) Vēs	Au(n) Vius	Ma(n) Vayus (m)/Vayas (f)	Ã viosī	Aao(n) veōs/ Vyōs
