= Sawan Fakir =

Sindhi poet

Sawan Fakir or Sawan Faqir (died 1918) was a classical Sindhi poet who used to recite poetry of a typical Sindhi form- "Bait". His "baits" were of great length.

Sawan Fakir belonged to Khaskheli tribe and was born in village Shahdad Khaskheli near Nindo Shaher (Badin District) in 1875–1870. Sawn Faqir used to graze cattle in his village. During drought of Chhapno he left Badin area and went to village Fazal Khaskheli where he started working as peasant with Wadero Khabbar Odejo in Juddho area.

Sawan Fakir wife and two brothers died due to cholera spread in 1918. Maula Bux Khaskheli, Sidiq Faqir of village Ghulam Hussain Jamali Taluka Badin, Bachayo Faqir Todo Faqir of Odero Lal were among his students.

Ali Kahn Korai, Hassan Faqir Hingoro, Taji Khan Chandio used to sung his "Bait". While among Alghozo players were Muso Khaskheli, resident of village Kandri, near Rajo Khanani, Hussain Khaskheli village Kandri, Khabbar Khaskheli (blind person) resident of Seenhao taluka Tando Bago, Faqir Gulo Othari of Badin.
