= Haji Abdullah Shah =

Haji Abdullah Shah حاجي عبدالله شاھ
- Village
- Abdullah Shah
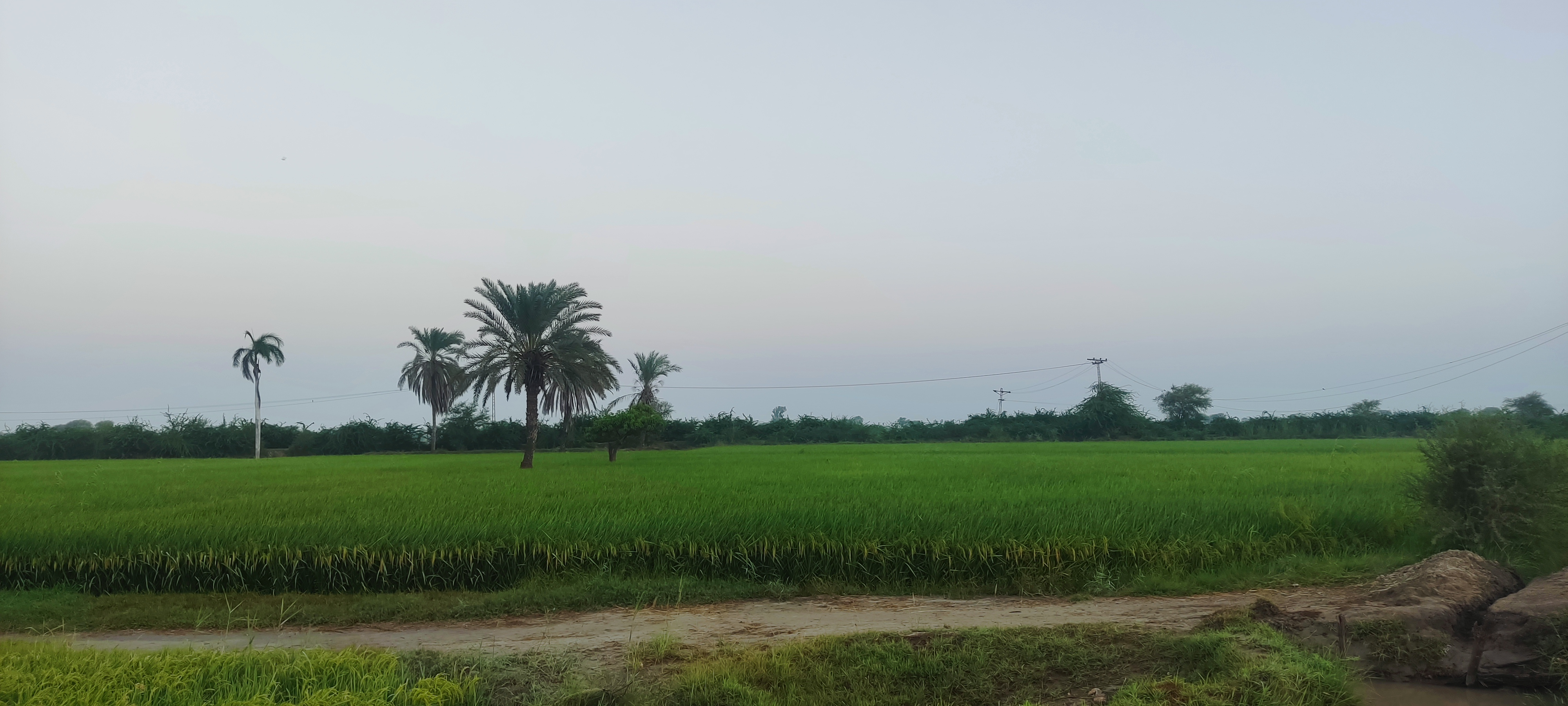
- Rice Field at Haji Abdullah Shah

- Coat of arms
- Nickname: Panu/Shah Jo goth
- Haji Abdullah Shah
- Coordinates: 24°35′24.62″N 68°57′32.96″E
- Pakistan: Pakistan
- Province: Sindh
- District: Badin
- Tehsil: Badin
- Founder: Syed Haji Abdullah Shah Bukhari

Government
  - Type: Union Council
  - Body: Haji Abdullah Shah
  - Chairperson: (PPP)

Population (2017)
  - Total: Above 44,627
- Time zone: UTC+5 (PST)
- Post code: 72200
- Area code: 297

Haji Abdullah Shah (Sindhi, Urdu: حاجی عبداللہ شاہ، حاجي عبدالله شاھ) is a village and union council in Badin, Sindh, Pakistan. It is located 20 km (12 mi) southeast of Badin.

== Languages ==
Native people of Haji Abdullah Shah speak Sindhi in social gatherings, but there are other languages spoken by different tribes as well. A form of balochi is spoken by the Khaskheli and Jamali tribes, and the Kohli and Bhil tribes speak Dhatki or Thari.

== Weather ==
Weather in Haji Abdullah Shah is moderate and is tempered by the sea breeze which blows for eight months of the year from March to October, making the hot weather somewhat cooler than for most parts of Badin.

Cyclones, such as Cyclone Biparjoy, and floods often hit because of Haji Abdullah Shah's proximity to the sea.

Climate data for Haji Abdullah Shah
Month	Jan	Feb	Mar	Apr	May	Jun	Jul	Aug	Sep	Oct	Nov	Dec	Year
Record high °C (°F)	36.1 (97.0)	37.2 (99.0)	42.8 (109.0)	45.6 (114.1)	49.4 (120.9)	46.7 (116.1)	43.3 (109.9)	41.1 (106.0)	42.2 (108.0)	41.7 (107.1)	38.3 (100.9)	35.6 (96.1)	49.4 (120.9)
Mean daily maximum °C (°F)	25.8 (78.4)	28.6 (83.5)	34.0 (93.2)	38.4 (101.1)	39.8 (103.6)	38.0 (100.4)	35.1 (95.2)	33.6 (92.5)	34.4 (93.9)	35.8 (96.4)	31.9 (89.4)	26.7 (80.1)	33.5 (92.3)
Daily mean °C (°F)	17.2 (63.0)	20.1 (68.2)	25.4 (77.7)	30.1 (86.2)	32.7 (90.9)	32.8 (91.0)	31.1 (88.0)	29.8 (85.6)	29.6 (85.3)	29.7 (85.5)	23.9 (75.0)	18.4 (65.1)	26.7 (80.1)
Mean daily minimum °C (°F)	8.7 (47.7)	11.6 (52.9)	16.8 (62.2)	21.8 (71.2)	25.5 (77.9)	27.5 (81.5)	27.0 (80.6)	26.1 (79.0)	24.9 (76.8)	21.7 (71.1)	15.9 (60.6)	10.1 (50.2)	19.8 (67.6)
Record low °C (°F)	−1.1 (30.0)	1.0 (33.8)	5.0 (41.0)	13.0 (55.4)	17.5 (63.5)	21.1 (70.0)	23.0 (73.4)	22.5 (72.5)	20.6 (69.1)	12.0 (53.6)	6.7 (44.1)	2.5 (36.5)	−1.1 (30.0)
Average rainfall mm (inches)	1.0 (0.04)	3.6 (0.14)	2.3 (0.09)	2.5 (0.10)	0.7 (0.03)	10.8 (0.43)	70.5 (2.78)	89.9 (3.54)	34.4 (1.35)	3.7 (0.15)	1.7 (0.07)	1.1 (0.04)	222.2 (8.76)
Source: NOAA (1961-1990)

== Geography ==
Haji Abdullah Shah is an area of plains with some swamps and wetlands.
