= Khorwah =

Khorwah Khore Wah
- Village
- Location in Sindh Khorwah (Pakistan)
- Coordinates: 24.752685°N 68.415223°E
- Country: Pakistan
- Province: Sindh
- District: Badin

Population (2017)
  - Total: 7,574
- Time zone: UTC+5 (PST)
  - Summer (DST): UTC+6 (PDT)

Khorwah, also spelled Khore Wah, is a village and deh in Shaheed Fazil Rahu Tehsil of Badin District, Sindh, Pakistan. As of 2017, it has a population of 7,574, in 1,404 households. It is located about 26 miles (42 km) south of Tando Muhammad Khan by road, with other roads connecting it to Badin, Mirpur Bathoro, and Bulri Shah Karim.

Khorwah is the seat of a tapedar circle, which also includes the villages of Lakhi, Miano Karath, Narbut, and Nokhi. It is also the seat of a Union Council, which has a total population of 39,475.

Khorwah was founded in the late 1700s by Kamal Khor. (Note: The 1874 gazetteer said it was "supposed to have been built about 98 years ago", or about 1776.) As of 1874, it was described as a village held directly by the British government, and it had a population of 914 people, including 649 Hindus and 235 Muslims. Most residents were agriculturalists, along with a few merchants and shopkeepers. It was not as significant producer of manufacturing goods or a trading centre, although there was local trade in cloth, grain, and ghee. Some ghee and rice did also get traded long-distance, but only very little. It was then the seat of a tappedar in the pargana of Guni, and it also had a police lines.
