= Haji Essa Khan Bhurgri =

Village in Sindh, Pakistan

Haji Essa Khan Bhurgri (حاجي عيسا خان ڀرڳڙي) is a village of Talhar taluka, in district Badin of the Sindh province, Pakistan. The village is located 7 km east of Rajo Khanani.
