= Sirani, Pakistan =

Sirani
- Village
- Location in Sindh Sirani (Pakistan)
- Coordinates: 24.495485°N 68.793067°E
- Country: Pakistan
- Region: Sindh
- District: Badin

Population (2017)
  - Total: 3,326
- Time zone: UTC+5 (PST)
  - Summer (DST): UTC+6 (PDT)

Sirani is a village and deh in Badin taluka of Badin District, Sindh. As of 2017, it has a population of 3,326, in 633 households. It is the seat of a tapedar circle, which also includes the villages of Bejoriro, Bidhadi, Chel, Ghurbi, Jakhralo, Maja Basri, Runghadi, and Talli. It is also the headquarters of a supervisory tapedar circle, which also includes the tapedar circles of Bandho, Bhadmi, Chorhadi, Daleji, Kak, and Lunwari Sharif. Sirani is also the seat of a Union Council, which has a total population of 43,200.
