= Soomra Rebellion of Tharri =

11th-century military conflict in Sindh

- Part of Ghaznavid campaigns in India
Date	c. 1026 CE
Location	Tharri, present-day Matli of Badin District, Sindh
Result	Soomra victory; Establishment of the Soomra dynasty

Belligerents
Soomras	Ghaznavid Empire

Commanders and leaders
Sultan Soomar Soomro	Mahmud of Ghazni

The Soomra Rebellion of Tharri was an uprising by the Soomras against the Ghaznavid Empire in Lower Sindh around 1026 CE. The rebellion culminated in an assembly at Tharri (Present day Matli in Badin District), where the Soomras elected their chief, Soomar, as the independent ruler of Sindh, reestablishing the Soomra dynasty.

== Background ==
In 1025, Mahmud of Ghazni invaded Sindh, capturing Mansura, the capital of Sindh, and defeating Amir Khafif Soomro I (r. 1011–1025). As Ghaznavid authority in Sindh declined, the Soomras gathered in Tharri and rebelled against the Ghaznavid Empire.

== Rebellion ==
Around 1026 CE, the Soomra tribe assembled at Tharri in present-day Matli of Badin District and proclaimed their chief, Soomar (also called Sumar), as the independent ruler of Sindh. As Ghaznavid authority over Sindh had weakened, Soomar established control over much of the region. He consolidated his rule by marrying the daughter of the powerful Arab chieftain Sa'd of Naserpur.

Mir Ma'sum placed the rebellion during the reign of Sultan Abd al-Rashid ibn Mahmud. This chronology has not been accepted by most historians and is generally regarded as only partially correct.

== Aftermath ==
The rebellion established Soomra authority over the entirety of Sindh and also Jhalawan and the Kacchi Plains. In the following decades, the Ghaznavids launched only a few raids against the Soomras, primarily between 1040 and 1049.
