= Larr (region) =

Linguistic and Geographical Region of Sindh

Larr or Laar لاڙ (Sindhi)
- Region
- Country: Pakistan
- Province: Sindh

Languages
  - Main language: Sindhi
- Time zone: UTC+5 (PST)

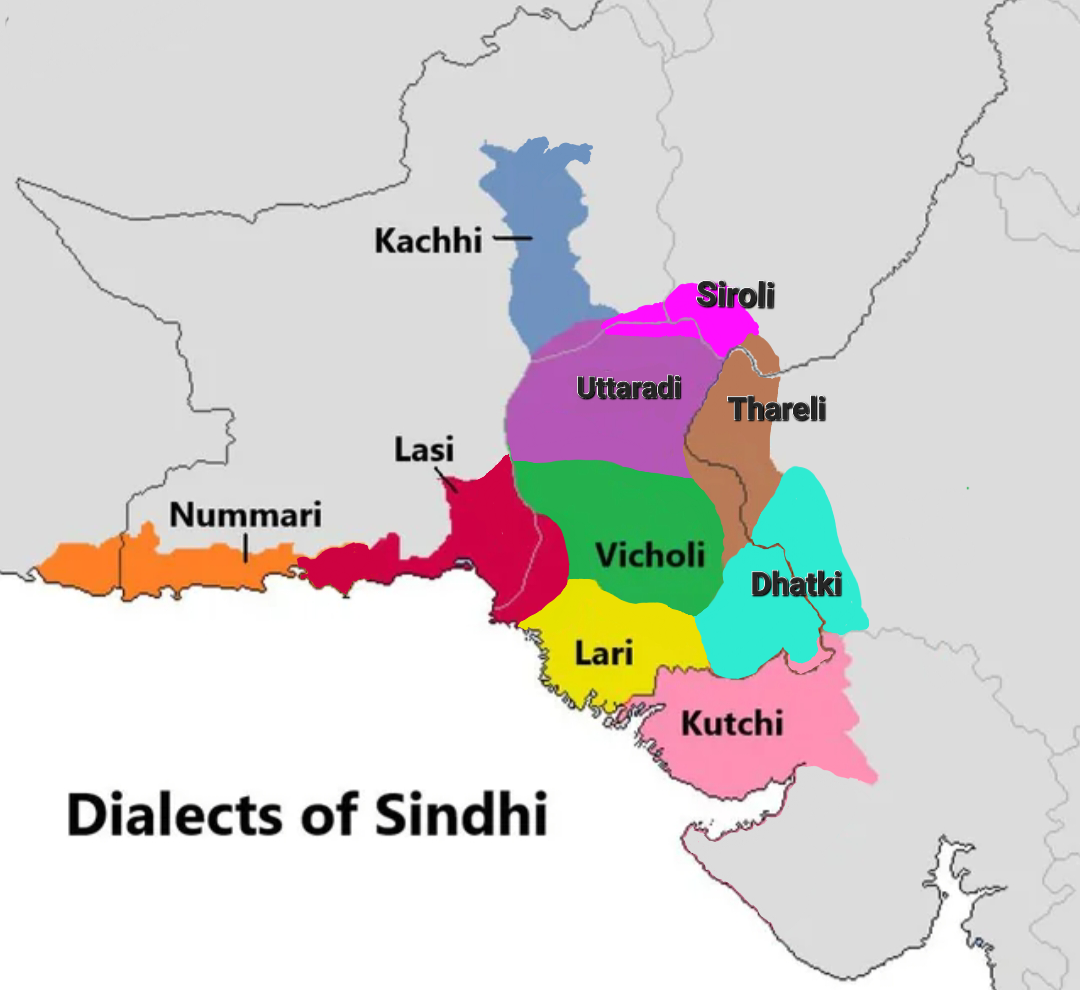
Map of Sindhi dialects and regions, with Larr in yellow.

Larr (Sindhi: لاڙ) also pronounced as Laar is a linguistic and geographical region in Sindh Comprising all of Southern Sindh except Tharparkar and the entirety of Mirpur Khas Division. It spans from Ganjo Takkar Hills near Hyderabad and all the way south till Arabian Sea of the coast of Badin District and consists of entire districts of Tando Muhammad Khan District, all of Southern coastal areas of Karachi, Sujawal District and Thatta District. The Lari Dialect of Sindhi is spoken here.

== Etymology ==
The word Larr is derived from the Sindhi word Laryal (Sindhi: لڙيل) meaning the southern portion or the downward part.

== Dialect ==
The dialect of the Sindhi language spoken here is called "Lari" or 'Larri" (Sindhi: لاڙي). Many of Shah Jo Risalo and Shah Abdul Karim Bulri's poetry is also in this dialect, In the Lari dialect, aspirated sounds (letters with an 'h' sound) are used less frequently. For example: "Digho" (long) becomes "Digo", "Ghangho" / "Ghaṇo" (much/many) becomes "Gaṇo", "Ghar" (home) becomes "Gar", "Ghoṛo" (horse) becomes "Goṛo", "Chaṛhyo" (climbed) becomes "Charyo", "Māṇhū" (person/human) becomes "Māṛū" etc. Similarly, suffixes and endings are also used in a unique and distinct manner in this dialect.

== History ==
The earliest mention of the southern region of Sindh is by the famous 11th century Arab Geographer Al-Biruni, who talks about the Lari script and Larr-Desha (The Southern Region):

"The alphabet used for Sindhi language in Southern Sindh towards sea- coast, was 'Malwari. In Bahmanva (al- Mansurah), 'Saindhva Script' was most commonly used. Lari writing system was in use in Lar Desha, whereas 'Ardhanagari Script' was commonly used by the people of Bhatia area and other parts of Sindh."

=== Medieval ===
The Larr region remained the Capital of the Soomra and Samma dynasties of Sindh. Matli in Badin was the historic capital of the Soomra dynasty from where they established their authority over Sindh. Larr remained the stronghold of the Soomra dynasty.Thatta was the capital of the Samma dynasty of Sindh, It was during this time that the Makli Necropolis rose to prominence as a funerary site. Thatta proved to be a Strong Capital. Thatta remained the capital of the Turko-mongol Arghun and the Tarkhan dynasties of Sindh.

After Tarkhans the Mughal Empire got control over the entirety of Sindh. The Mughals reorganized the Larr region into the Subah of Thatta, making it an imperial province administered directly by the Mughal government.

== See also ==
- Sindhi language
- Sindh
- Lari dialect (Sindhi)
- Thatta Subah
- Thatta District
- Badin District
