= Malhan =

Coordinates: 25°04′N 68°42′E

Malhan is a village in Matli Taluka, Badin District, Sindh, Pakistan. The village has a population of about 4,000 in 300 houses from the Nizamani, Khaskheli, Shedi, Memon, Mallaah, Talpur, Meghwar, Kolhi and Bhel tribes. The Sindhi Awami Tehrik, Pakistan Peoples Party and Pakistan Muslim League (F) are the political parties active in the village.
