= Tarai, Badin =

Tarai
- Village
- Location in Sindh Tarai (Pakistan)
- Coordinates: 24.689007°N 68.671426°E
- Country: Pakistan
- Region: Sindh
- District: Badin

Population (2017)
  - Total: 6,182
- Time zone: UTC+5 (PST)
  - Summer (DST): UTC+6 (PDT)

Tarai is a village and deh in Shaheed Fazil Rahu taluka of Badin District, Sindh. As of 2017, it has a population of 6,182, in 1,190 households. It is the seat of a tapedar circle, which also includes the villages of Kand, Kandar Jagir, Nari, and Shaikhano. It is also the headquarters of a supervisory tapedar circle, which also includes the tapedar circles of Akri-1, Gharo, Gunwrah, Kario, and Salehabad. Tarai is also the seat of a Union Council, which has a total population of 46,005.

Tarai's Shah Talib mosque dates back to the Kalhoro dynasty in the 1700s. It features three domes over the main sanctuary and stylistically resembles the mosque at Chuteyarun (in Sanghar District), which was built around the same time period.
