= Akai, Sindh =

Akai
- Village
- Location in Sindh Akai (Pakistan)
- Coordinates: 24.787195°N 68.742404°E
- Country: Pakistan
- Region: Sindh
- District: Badin

Population (2017)
  - Total: 3,373
- Time zone: UTC+5 (PST)
  - Summer (DST): UTC+6 (PDT)

Akai is a village and deh in Shaheed Fazil Rahu taluka of Badin District, Sindh. As of 2017, it has a population of 3,373, in 609 households. It is part of the tapedar circle of Gharo.
