= Luari Sharif =

Luari Sharif Luari, Lowari
- Union council
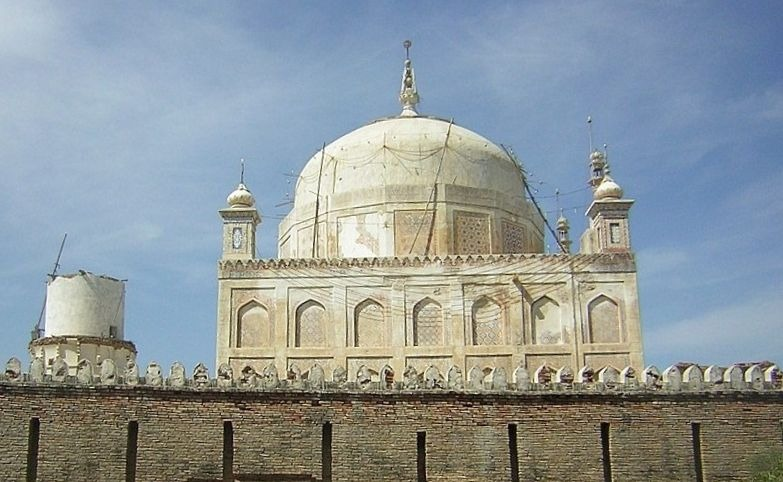

- Location in Sindh Luari Sharif (Pakistan)
- Coordinates: 24.561745°N 68.902034°E
- Country: Pakistan
- Region: Sindh
- District: Badin

Population (2017)
  - Total: 9,527
- Time zone: UTC+5 (PST)
  - Summer (DST): UTC+6 (PDT)

Luari Sharif, also spelled Lowari, is a town and union council in Shaheed Fazil Rahu taluka of Badin District, Sindh. As of 2017, it has a population of 9,527, in 1,907 households. It is the site of the shrine of Hazrat Khawaja Muhammad Zaman, one of the most revered religious figures in Sindh. The shrine, among the oldest in Sindh, was closed for 37 years due to a custodianship dispute before being reopened in January 2020. This hindered renovation and maintenance of the shrine, which it especially needed after suffering substantial damage during the 2011 Sindh floods. A 2015 attempt by the Auqaf department had been cancelled after tension escalated between the two rival groups, leading to one person being shot and killed. The successful 2020 reopening of the shrine took place without incident, with law enforcement officers on standby, and Auqaf Secretary Munawwar Mahesar unlocked the shrine's main entrance. The shrine is open to women in the mornings and to men in the evenings.
