= PS-68 Badin-I =

Constituency of the Provincial Assembly of Sindh, Pakistan

- Constituency for the Provincial Assembly of Sindh
- Region: Matli Tehsil (partly) of Badin District
- Electorate: 192,570

Current constituency
- Member: Vacant
- Created from: PS-55 Badin-I (2002-2018); PS-70 Badin-I (2018-2023)

PS-68 Badin-I (پی ایس-68، بدین-1) is a constituency of the Provincial Assembly of Sindh.

== General elections 2024 ==
Provincial election 2024: PS-68 Badin-I
Party	Candidate	Votes	%	±%
PPP	Muhammad Halepoto	63,506	74.80	
GDA	Mansoor AIi Nizamani	14,236	16.77	
PTI	Atta Ur Rahman (Note: Filed nomination papers as PTI candidate but ECP allowed him to run as an Independent)	3,634	4.28	
Others	Others (nine candidates)	3,530	4.15	
Turnout		88,207	45.81	
Total valid votes		84,906	96.26	
Rejected ballots		3,301	3.74	
Majority		49,270	58.03	
Registered electors		192,570		
PPP hold				

== General elections 2018 ==
Provincial election 2018: PS-70 Badin-I
Party	Candidate	Votes	%	±%
PPP	Bashir Ahmed	44,415	61.27	
GDA	Riaz Ahmed	23,137	31.92	
MMA	Gul Hassan	2,745	3.79	
Independent	Shahid Ahmed	1,047	1.44	
PML(N)	Rizwana	532	0.73	
PSP	Izhar Shah	113	0.16	
Independent	Muhammad Hanifo	110	0.15	
Independent	Muhammad Halepoto	91	0.13	
Independent	Tabasum Sahar	84	0.12	
AAT	Manzoor Ahmed	80	0.11	
Independent	Sagheer Ahmed Laghari	66	0.09	
Independent	Muhammad Saleh Halepoto	56	0.08	
Independent	Ghulam Sarwar Laghari	17	0.02	
Majority		21,278	29.35	
Valid ballots		72,493		
Rejected ballots		3,598		
Turnout		76,091		
Registered electors		141,681		
hold				

== General elections 2013 ==
Contesting candidates	Party affiliation	Votes polled

== General elections 2008 ==
Contesting candidates	Party affiliation	Votes polled

== See also ==
- PS-67 Tando Muhammad Khan-II
- PS-69 Badin-II
