= Kario Ghanwer =

Coordinates: 24°48′18″N 68°36′17″E

Kario Gahanwar (Urdu: کڑيو گہنور) (Sindhi: ڪڙيو گهنور) is a town in Badin District in the Sindh province of Pakistan. It is famous for its agriculture. The main crops of the town are rice, canola, sunflowers and sugarcane.

== Nearby towns ==
These are the closest towns with coordinates to this town:

- Talhar (14.0 miles / 22.6 km E/NE)
- Mātli (16.2 miles / 26.0 km N)
- Bulri (17.3 miles / 27.8 km W/NW)
- Badīn (18.7 miles / 30.0 km SE)
- Rajo Khanani (19.2 miles / 30.8 km NE)
- Tando Muhammad Khan (21.2 miles / 34.1 km N/NW)
- Mirpur Bathoro (22.8 miles / 36.7 km W/SW)
- Tando Bagho (23.2 miles / 37.4 km E)
- Daro (26.5 miles / 42.6 km W)
- Tando Ghulām Ali (27.1 miles / 43.7 km NE)

== Notable people ==
- Fazil Rahu

== Sources ==
- Article title
