= Fazil Rahu =

Pakistani political and peasant leader

Shaheed Fazil Rahu فاضل راهو
- Fazil Rahu

Personal details
- Born: 1934 Rahuki, Pakistan
- Died: January 17, 1987 (aged 52–53) Golarchi Taluka
- Cause of death: Assassination
- Party: Awami Tahreek
- Children: 3
- Education: Karrio Ganhwar School
- Known for: Peasant Leader
- Awards: General Secretary, Sindhi Awami Tahreek (now Awami Tahreek), Senior Vice President, ANP (Awami National Party), President, Sindhi Haari Tehreek, Joint Secretary, M.R.D Movement (Sindh) in 1982, Front Line Leader, Remove Censorship Movement (Journalists Movement).

Shaheed Fazil Rahoo (Sindhi: فاضل راهو; 1934 – 17 January 1987) was a Pakistani political leader and one of the most famous peasant leaders in Sindh. He was born in 1934 at Rahuki village, Badin district of Sindh, which became part of Pakistan in 1947. He struggled for peasant rights throughout his life and remained imprisoned for several years and was assassinated on 17 January 1987.

== Early life ==
Fazil Rahu was born in 1934 at Rahuki, a village in Badin district of Sindh, present-day Pakistan.

== Entry to politics ==
Rahu won B.D. Elections in 1962 and later in 1965 to become the chairman of Union Council Taraai. He initiated the "Publish Voter Lists in Sindhi" movement in 1969. The foundation of Sindhi Awaami Tehreek was laid and Fazil Rahu was elected President of Awami Tahreek after Hafeez Qureshi in a Sindhi Qaumi Convention at Hyderabad in 1970. Fazil Rahu in a joint effort with his fellow members, organized a Sindhi language Convention in Jaamia Arabia High School, Hyderabad in 1971.

He staged a massive "Haari Conference" where thousands of people gathered at his native village of Rahuki in October 1979. He and his son Muhammad Siddique Rahu were jailed for holding a peaceful political conference at Rahuki in October 1979. He supported and fought the case of Sindhi people during the Sindhi-Muhaajir riots in 1983. He addressed a huge gathering under the platform of M.R.D at Badin, in 1983. Rahu was given poisonous capsules in Landhi Jail through a prisoner, and in the meanwhile that prisoner was secretly moved from Landhi Jail to somewhere else in order to conceal the real culprits behind that ulterior motive. In the same night, Fazil Rahu was shifted to Sukkur Jail in the state of unconsciousness instead of rescuing him to any hospital. Mobilized the people on all levels starting from his own home where his whole family was actively involved in political scenario. The women participated through the platform of "Sindhiani Tahreek", youth was involved through "Sindhi Shagird Tahreek" and the children also were an active part of "Sujaag Baar Tahreek". Fazil Rahu led by example. He himself, his wife, son, two daughters and many family members had to face voluntary and forced, political imprisonment at numerous occasion throughout his political life.

== Honors and awards ==
- General Secretary, Sindhi Awaami Tehreek (now Qomi Awaami Tehreek)
- Senior Vice President, ANP (Awami National Party)
- President, Sindhi Haari Tehreek
- Joint Secretary, M.R.D Movement (Sindh) in 1982
- Front Line Leader, Remove Censorship Movement (Journalists Movement)

== Movements ==
- Anti-One Unit Movement (March, 1968)
- Movement of Publishing Voter Lists in Sindh (1969)
- Sindhi Awaami Tehreek (1970)
- Stop Auction Movement (Neelam Band Karyo Tehreek, March, 1970)
- Stop Oppression Movement (Zulam Band Karyo Tehreek, 1970)
- Sindhi Haari Committee (1974 at Hyderabad)
- M.R.D. Movement
- Jail Bharyo Tehreek
- Remove Censorship Movement ("Shaafi Tehreek" Journalists Movement in Zia-ul-Haq's dictatorship)

== Imprisonments ==
Fazil Rahu was imprisoned at various periods in his life. Among the prisons he had to face were Naara Jail Hyderabad, Mach Jail Baluchistan, Landhi Jail Karachi, Kot Lakhpat Jail, Central Jail Karachi, Central Jail Sukkur, Central Jail Hyderabad, Khairpur, District Jail Badin etc.

== Assassination ==
Fazil Rahu was martyred in a premeditated conspiracy by an axe attack on the back of his head in Golarchi (Now Shaheed Fazil Rahu) on 17 January 1987 at 02.00 p.m.
