= Sonhar =

Pakistani village

Sonhar Sonhār, Haji Qasim Sumro
- Village
- Location in Sindh Sonhar (Pakistan)
- Coordinates: 24.696695°N 68.964964°E
- Country: Pakistan
- Region: Sindh
- District: Badin

Population (2017)
  - Total: 2,382
- Time zone: UTC+5 (PST)
  - Summer (DST): UTC+6 (PDT)

Sonhar, also known as Haji Qasim Sumro, is a village and deh in Tando Bago Tehsil of Badin District, Sindh. As of 2017, it has a population of 2,382 people, in 463 households. The village falls within the tapedar circle of Mir Himat Ali.
