= Jarki =

Jarki may refer to:

- Jarki, Poland, a village near Rojewo
- Jarki, Croatia, a village near Cestica
- Jarki, Badin, a village in Sindh, Pakistan
- Jarki (political organisation), a Basque independence organisation
