= Khathar =

- Village
- Location in Sindh Khathar (Pakistan)
- Coordinates: 24.816999°N 68.567631°E
- Country: Pakistan
- Province: Sindh
- District: Badin

Population (2017)
  - Total: 2,790
- Time zone: UTC+5 (PST)
  - Summer (DST): UTC+6 (PDT)

Khathar daro کٿڙ دڙو is a village and deh in Shaheed Fazil Rahu Tehsil of Badin District in Sindh province of Pakistan. As of 2017, it has a population of 2,790, in 546 households. It is part of the tapedar circle of Jhol-1.
