= Agham Kot =

- Agham, Aghamani, Aghamano
- Location within Sindh Location within Pakistan
- 25°13′50″N 68°46′20″E
- Type: Settlement
- Location: Deh Aghamano, Matli Taluka, Badin District, Sindh, Pakistan

History
- Built: 700s or earlier
- Abandoned: Late 1700s

Site notes
- Condition: In ruins
- Management: None

Agham Kot (Sindhi: اگھم ڪوٽ), historically known as Agham and today also called Aghamani or Aghamano, is a historical city and present-day ruin site located in Badin District, Sindh, Pakistan. It is located about 1.5 km northwest of the current town of Ghulab Khan Laghari, near the border with Hyderabad District. Agham Kot historically lay on the right bank of the Dhoro, a branch of the Indus River that is now dried up. Because of this strategic location on an important waterway, Agham Kot was an important commercial centre in its heyday.

Today, the site of Agham Kot consists of several mounds that rise 3–5 m above the surrounding farmland and are spread across an area of 200 acres. Some of these mounds are crowned with old mosques or tombs, which are all in poor condition. Some tombs belong to Sufi saints and draw pilgrims from throughout Sindh. Only a small portion of the city's old fort is still standing.

== History ==
The early history of Agham Kot is alluded to in works such as the Chachnama and the Tuhfat al-Karam. The former, for example, describes pre-Muslim Agham Kot as a rich city that lay on the bank of the Indus. The latter describes it as an important trading hub under Arab rule after the Muslim conquest of Sindh. According to legend, Muhammad bin Qasim supposedly founded mosques during his brief stay at Agham Kot, providing a starting point for the growth of Muslim religious culture in the city and its surroundings.

Around the time of the Samma dynasty, Agham Kot emerged as one of the great learning centres of Sindh, with hundreds of madrasas and thousands of students. After Thatta, it was the most important city in Sindh for Islamic education. A prominent figure of this period was the Sufi saint Makhdoom Muhammad Ismail Soomro, who died in 1588 CE (996 AH) and was buried here in a monumental tomb which still stands. He also established a madrasa here which, at its peak, is said to have had 500 students. Agham Kot remained an important centre of Islamic education through the time of the Kalhoro dynasty, but none of its madrasas remain standing today.

According to the Tarikh-i-Tahiri, during the Mughal era Agham Kot lay in the historical pargana of Samawani, in the sarkar of Nasarpur.

Agham Kot continued to flourish until the 18th century. The reason for its decline and eventual abandonment is debated. Some historians, such as M.H. Panhwar, cite the city's destruction by the Afghan invader Madad Ali Khan Pathan, which is variously dated to 1781 or sometime in the 1790s. Madad Khan destroyed other cities at the time, such as Badin, Bukera, and Nasarpur; they were rebuilt, but Agham Kot was not, and its residents migrated to other parts of Sindh. Other historians, such as Kaleemullah Lashari, favour a more economic explanation: when the Indus changed course in the 1700s, the city no longer had access to a vital artery of transport and commerce, and it lost its status as a major trading centre. Its residents then migrated to other major commercial cities, such as Hyderabad, which was then the political capital of Sindh, or Thatta, which was still the most important city in the region.

== Site description ==
The current archaeological site of Agham Kot covers an area of 200 acres. It consists of several mounds, ranging from 3 to 5 meters in height. Various artifacts have been found in these mounds such as pottery fragments, terracotta toys, decorated tiles, and copper coins. This debris has been dated to the 8th-13th centuries CE. Some newer structures are located on top of the mounds, mostly dated to the 17th and 18th centuries. There are six mosques, as well as saints' tombs.

One of the shrine at Agham Kot honours Makhdoom Muhammad Ismail Soomro, a 16th-century Sufi saint who is held as the patron saint of the Patoli community but also revered by other groups as well. The shrine, which is entered by way of a monumental domed gate, consists of a square 8x8 meter structure that is ornately decorated in ceramic tiles, but most of them have since fallen off. The interior was covered in paintings of floral patterns, but these have also been damaged. Besides Makhdoom Muhammad Ismail, the mausoleum also houses the tombs of his sons Makhdoom Muhammad Hamid and Makhdoom Muhammad Yahya, as well as that of his grandson Makhdoom Muhammad Qasim. His daughter, Bibi Ayesha, was buried in a separate tomb just to the north, while to the east of her tomb are two others: one belongs to her father's disciple Makhdoom Muhammad Ismail Quraishi, and the other belongs to one Saeed Khan Madvani Laghari, an 18th-century military officer serving under the Kalhoro dynasty.

Another prominent tomb belongs to Shah Abdul Majid, who is regarded as the patron saint of the Hindu Lohana community. His original tomb collapsed many years ago and a new one was built by Lohana devotees of his. There is also the 18th-century tomb of Makhdoom Sadho Mohayo, which features mud-plastered walls whitewashed with lime; like Makhdoom Muhammad Ismail Soomro's tomb, its interior is also covered in floral paintings.

The old city's Jami mosque was built during the Kalhoro dynasty, with its inscription dating it to 1755 CE during the reign of Mian Muradyab Kalhoro. The mosque's foundation stones and dado were inscribed by the stone engraver (sarang-tash) Abu Talib Makarpayo of Thatta. There is also another Kalhoro-era mosque at Agham Kot, of which the western wall and gate have survived.

Located by the site's entrance is the Patanwari Masjid, or "mosque along the jetty". It is now almost completely collapsed, with only the arches surviving. This mosque was originally built next to the jetty on the riverside where cargo and passenger boats would arrive. Because of this location by the Dhoro, it was built with a high foundation and thick walls.

The fort of Agham Kot, like the city itself, is attributed to Agham Lohana. Its walls once stood 20 feet thick and were built out of brick, ashes, and limestone. The fort was damaged by Madad Khan's attack in the late 1700s, and a storm in 1999 further damaged what was left. Only a small portion of the outer wall survives today.

== Shrine of Bibi Maham ==
In Agham Kot also stands the shrine of Bibi Maham who traveled from Arab to Sindh and settled in Agham Kot, her actual name is Khadijah, the daughter of Shi'ite Imam Musa Al-Kazim, the name "Maham" is believed to be given by the locals who also know her as "Medinay Wali Bibi" which translates to "The Lady of Medinah". Bibi Maham Khadijah belongs to the sacred lineage of the Islamic prophet Muhammad through Imam Musa Kazim, and is estimated to arrive in Indian Subcontinent somewhere between 128 A.H and 170 A.H–deduced from the inscription from the grave's headstone, during the rule of Abbasid dynasty over the Arabian peninsula. Due to the persecution of the descendants of Imam Ali son of Abi Talib at the hands of Abbasid caliphs many members from the progeny of Muhammad had to migrate to far-off lands including the children of Imam Musa Al-Kazim, imprisoned at the time on orders of Harun Al-Rashid, which also seems to be the reason of Bibi Maham's migration to Sindh region.

Bibi Maham Khadijah bint-e Imam Musa Kazim's grave was discovered in 2002 by historians and a shrine was built upon the grave in 2009. In 2010, a sindhi editorial was published by Abdul Sattar Dars, chief editor of Mahana Parado, in which historical details of the shrine were published. Since its inception the shrine has been visited by different researchers and scholars alike who have verified the discovery. According to the persian inscription on the headstone, the grave dates back to 170 A.H which makes it the oldest tomb in the region. Shrine is currently constructed with burnt brick and lime plaster with a tier and girder roof. The size of the Shrine is 10m x 5.5m with an entrance to its south, whereas the size of the tomb is 4m x 5.5m. In the courtyard there are four graves and inside the tomb there are three more graves. The interior of the tomb has been renovated with modern tiles. Ministry of Awqaf has authenticated the shrine and construction for a proper and bigger shrine under Ministry of Awqaf will soon begin.

== Present condition ==
The site of Agham Kot is poorly maintained and suffers from official neglect as well as residential encroachment — 130 of its 200 acres are illegally occupied as of 2019. Many structures are in precarious condition or have already collapsed.

Agham Kot is not officially listed as a culture heritage site, although as of 2015 it is included on a "tentative list" of candidates for future listing. As a result, it does not receive government protection. Locals and visitors have taken many artifacts and either displayed them in their homes or sold them for money.

The 2011 Sindh floods uncovered parts of the ruins at Agham Kot, and careless human activity ended up damaging or destroying a lot of what was dislodged. Local social workers requested assistance from the provincial archaeology department, but only one official came, and briefly.
