= Chanesri =

Pakistani village

- Village
- Location in Sindh Chanesri (Pakistan)
- Coordinates: 24.628561°N 68.915165°E
- Country: Pakistan
- Region: Sindh
- District: Badin

Population (2017)
  - Total: 2,971
- Time zone: UTC+5 (PST)
  - Summer (DST): UTC+6 (PDT)

Chanesri is a village and deh in Badin taluka of Badin District, Sindh. As of 2017, it has a population of 2,971, in 524 households. It is part of the tapedar circle of Kamaro.
