= Dumbalo =

- Village
- Location in Sindh Dumbalo (Pakistan)
- Coordinates: 25.147306°N 68.95627°E
- Country: Pakistan
- Region: Sindh
- District: Badin

Population (2017)
  - Total: 8,735
- Time zone: UTC+5 (PST)
  - Summer (DST): UTC+6 (PDT)

Dumbalo is a village and deh in Matli taluka of Badin District, Sindh. As of 2017, it has a population of 8,735, in 1,687 households. It is part of the tapedar circle of Gujo-I. Dumbalo is also the seat of a Union Council, which has a total population of 52,212.
