= Mir Ghulam Ali Talpur (Badin politician) =

Pakistani politician

- میر غلام علی تالپور

Member of the National Assembly of Pakistan
- Incumbent
- Assumed office 29 February 2024
- Constituency: NA-222 Badin-I
- In office 13 August 2018 – 10 August 2023
- Constituency: NA-229 (Badin-I)

Personal details
- Party: PPP (2018-present)
- Parent: Mir Bandeh Ali Khan Talpur (father)

Mir Ghulam Ali Talpur is a Pakistani politician who has been a member of the National Assembly of Pakistan since February 2024 and previously served in this position from August 2018 until August 2023.

== Political career ==
He was elected to the National Assembly of Pakistan from NA-229 (Badin-I) as a candidate of Pakistan Peoples Party (PPP) in the 2018 Pakistani general election. He received 96,977 votes and defeated Muhammad Hassam Mirza, a candidate of the Grand Democratic Alliance (GDA).

He was re-elected to the National Assembly as a candidate of PPP from NA-222 Badin-I in the 2024 Pakistani general election. He received 113,989 votes and defeated Mir Hussain Bux Talpur, a candidate of the GDA.
