= Terai (disambiguation) =

Terai is a region in India, Nepal and Bhutan.

Terai or Tarai may also refer to:

== Places ==
- Terai, Ishikawa, a former town in Japan
- Terai Station, a railway station in Nomi, Ishikawa Prefecture, Japan
- Tarai, Badin, a village in Pakistan

== Other uses ==
- Tarai (function), a mathematical function
- Terai hat, a type of hat
- Bibhu Prasad Tarai (born 1964), Indian politician
- Shin Terai, Japanese musician and producer

== See also ==
- Terei (disambiguation)
