= Bokhi =

Pakistani village

- Village
- Location in Sindh Bokhi (Pakistan)
- Coordinates: 24.660625°N 68.93068°E
- Country: Pakistan
- Region: Sindh
- District: Badin

Population (2017)
  - Total: 2,848
- Time zone: UTC+5 (PST)
  - Summer (DST): UTC+6 (PDT)

Bokhi is a village and deh in Badin taluka of Badin District, Sindh. As of 2017, it has a population of 2,848, in 584 households. It is part of the tapedar circle of Qaimpur.
