= Jhalar, Sindh =

Jhalar
- Village
- Location in Sindh Jhalar (Pakistan)
- Coordinates: 24.730291°N 68.793302°E
- Country: Pakistan
- Region: Sindh
- District: Badin

Population (2017)
  - Total: 1,713
- Time zone: UTC+5 (PST)
  - Summer (DST): UTC+6 (PDT)

Jhalar is a village and deh in Badin taluka of Badin District, Sindh. As of 2017, it has a population of 1,713, in 334 households. It is part of the tapedar circle of Pano.
