= Dasarki =

Dasarki Goth Daseri
- Village
- Location in Sindh Dasarki (Pakistan)
- Coordinates: 24.784848°N 68.504306°E
- Country: Pakistan
- Region: Sindh
- District: Badin

Population (2017)
  - Total: 2,761
- Time zone: UTC+5 (PST)
  - Summer (DST): UTC+6 (PDT)

Dasarki, a.k.a. Goth Daseri, is a village and deh in Shaheed Fazil Rahu taluka of Badin District, Sindh. As of 2017, it has a population of 2,761, in 498 households. It is part of the tapedar circle of Agri.
