= Kamaro, Badin, Badin =

Kamaro
- Village
- Location in Sindh Kamaro (Pakistan)
- Coordinates: 24.637163°N 68.862482°E
- Country: Pakistan
- Region: Sindh
- District: Badin

Population (2017)
  - Total: 3,429
- Time zone: UTC+5 (PST)
  - Summer (DST): UTC+6 (PDT)

Kamaro is a village and deh in Badin taluka of Badin District, Sindh. As of 2017, it has a population of 3,429, in 673 households. It is the seat of a tapedar circle, which also includes the villages of Bakho Khudi, Chanesri, and Ret.
