= Saidapur (disambiguation) =

Saidapur is a village and a mandal in Karimnagar district, Andhra Pradesh, India.

Saidapur may also refer to:

- Saidapur, Yadgir, a town in Yadgir taluka, Yadgir district, Karnataka, India
- Saidapur, Maharashtra, a village, List of villages in Pathardi taluka, in Pathardi taluka, Ahmednagar district, Maharashtra State, India
- Saidapur, a ward of the assembly constituency Sri Nagar, Uttar Pradesh, India
- Srinivas Kishanrao Saidapur (born 1947), Indian reproductive biologist

== See also ==
- Saidpur (disambiguation)
