= Ghulam Ali Nizamani =

Pakistani politician

Member of the National Assembly of Pakistan
- In office 2002–2013
- Constituency: NA-224 (Badin-cum-Tando Muhammad Khan-I)

Ghulam Ali Nizamani is a Pakistani politician who was a member of the National Assembly of Pakistan from 2002 to 2013.

== Political career ==
He was elected to the National Assembly of Pakistan from Constituency NA-224 (Badin-I) as a candidate of Pakistan Peoples Party (PPP) in the 2002 Pakistani general election. He received 70,231 votes and defeated an independent candidate, Akram Nizamani.

He was elected to the National Assembly from Constituency NA-224 (Badin-cum-Tando Muhammad Khan-I) as a candidate of PPP in the 2008 Pakistani general election. He received 87,102 votes and defeated Ali Akber Nizaman, a candidate of Pakistan Muslim League (F) (PML-F).

He ran for the seat of the National Assembly from Constituency NA-224 (Badin-cum-Tando Muhammad Khan-I) as an independent candidate in the 2013 Pakistani general election but was unsuccessful. He received 281 votes and lost the seat to Sardar Kamal Khan.
