= Muhammad Siddique Musafir =

Pakistani writer (1879–1961)

Muhammad Siddique Musafir محمد صديق مسافر
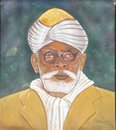
- Born: Muhammad Siddique محمد صديق; 1 April 1879; Tando Bago, District Badin, Bombay Presidency, British India
- Died: 24 September 1961 (aged 82); Tando Bago, Sindh
- Citizenship: Pakistani
- Occupations: Scholar, teacher, researcher, poet, journalist
- Writing career
- Genres: Prose, Poetry

Muhammad Siddique Musafir (1 April 1879 - 24 September 1961) was an educationist, writer, poet, translator, historian, and journalist of Sindh, Pakistan. He was appointed as a Persian and Sindhi teacher in Training College for Men, Hyderabad. He also served as an editor of the Sindhi-language magazine "Akhbar-e-Taleem" for 18 years. From 1920 to 1925, Siddique served as the head master at Lawrence Madrisa and retired in March 1932. His poems were part of school curriculum for many years. He also served as the first in-charge of Khan Bahadur Mir Ghulam Muhammad High School in Tando Bago.

== Biography ==
Muhammad Siddique was born on 1 April 1879 at Tando Bago, District Badin, Sindh, Pakistan. His father Bilal Sheedi was from Zanzibar and was sold as a slave to a businessman of Muscat (Oman) Shaikh Hussain. He was then sold to Makhdoom Saber Ali, who was from Tando Bago, Sindh. His master was so happy with Sheedi that he used to call him "Gulab" (lit. "rose"). This name became so popular that people forgot his real name, Bilal, and used to call him Gulab Sheedi.

Muhammad Siddique received early education in Tando Bago and after passing Vernacular examination (i.e. 7th classes) became a primary school teacher. Then he was appointed as a teacher at Training College for Men, Hyderabad. He started composing poems with his pen name "Musafir" (lit. "traveller"). He wrote in almost all formats of poetry including Ghazal, Musnavi, Musadas, Geet, Nazm, Qatio, Munajat and Kafi etc. He assisted Ghulam Muhammad Shahwani in translating "Gulistan Bostan" from Persian to Sindhi language.

He also wrote literary essays and articles, most of which were published in Akhbar-e-Taleem. He wrote text books for primary education in Sindh. Some of his poems remained part of school curriculum for many years.

On January 1st 1920, the social leader of lower Sindh Khan, Bahadur Mir Ghulam Muhammad Talpur, established a High School at his home town, Tando Bago. Muhammad Siddique Musafir was appointed as the first Incharge Head Master of this school. By working hard and with good management skill, this school became one of the best schools of the Badin District.

Muhammad Siddique retired in 1930 but remained affiliated with this school. When, Ghulam Muhammad opened Girls School, Muhammad Siddique used to help and train female teachers of the school.

He died on 24 September 1961 and was buried in Tando Bago graveyard.

== Publications ==
Sources:

- Akhlaq-e-Muhsini (Sindhi: اخلاق محسني)
- Angi Hisab (Mathematics), (Sindhi: انگي حساب)
- Balghan Ji Taileem (Adult Education), (Sindhi: بالغن جي تعليم)
- Chand Bibi (Sindhi: چاند بيبي)
- Deewan -e- Fazil (Sindhi: ديوان فاضل)
- Geometry for Class V, VI and VII (Sindhi: جاميٽري، پنجين، ڇھين ۽ ستين ڪلاس لاءِ)
- Ghulami ain Azadia ja Ibratnak Nizara (Sindhi: غلاميءَ ۽ آزاديءَ جا عبرتناڪ نظارا)
- Gul Badan (Novel translated from Urdu), (Sindhi: گل بدن)
- Gulshan-e-Khayal (Sindhi: گلستان خيال)
- Gulzar-e-Naser o Nazem (Sindhi: گلزار نثر و نظم)
- Hadayat-ul-Muslimeen in six volumes (Sindhi: ھدايت المسلمين، ڇھ ڀاڱا)
- Hayatia Jay Daur Ji Kunji (Sindhi: ھدايت جي در جي ڪنجي)
- Jametry and Tijarti Hisab (Geometry and Business Mathematics), (Sindhi: جاميٽري ۽ تجارتي حساب)
- Johar-e-Islam (Sindhi: جوھر اسلام)
- Matloob-ul-Momneen (Sindhi: مطلوب المومنين)
- Mumtaz Damsaz (Translated from Urdu), (Sindhi: ممتاز دمساز)
- Phool Dani, (Poetry) (Sindhi: ڦول داني)
- Qurub Qaleech (Sindhi: قرب قليچ)
- Ramooz-ul-Quran (Secrets of Quran) (Sindhi: رموزالقرآن)
- Shaheed-e-Karbala (Sindhi: شھيد ڪربلا)
- Sindhi Soonhoon (A Guide to Sindhi text book) in six volumes, (Sindhi: سنڌي سونھون)
- Sindhi Grammar in three volumes (Sindhi: سنڌي گرامر)
- Sindh Ji Jagraphi (Geography of Sindh) (Sindhi: سنڌ جي جاگرافي)
- Sindh Ji Tareekh, (History of Sindh), Volume IV and V, (Sindhi: سنڌ جي تاريخ، ڀاڱو چوٿون ۽ پنجون)
- Sujaan Zaloon (Sindhi: سڄاڻ زالون)
- Zeb-un-Nissa (Sindhi: زيب النسا)

He also wrote meaning and explanation of nine Chapters of the poetry of Shah Abdul Latif Bhitai.

Siddique's book named "Ghulami Aur Azadi Kay Ibratnaak Nazarey — Zindabad Azadi" has been translated from Urdu to sindhi by researcher Aslam Khwaja.
