= Singari, Pakistan =

Pakistani village

Singari Singāri, Goth Singari
- Village
- Location in Sindh Singari (Pakistan)
- Coordinates: 24.396499°N 69.010491°E
- Country: Pakistan
- Region: Sindh
- District: Badin

Population (2017)
  - Total: 7,491
- Time zone: UTC+5 (PST)
  - Summer (DST): UTC+6 (PDT)

Singari, also known as Goth Singari, is a village and deh in Badin taluka of Badin District, Sindh. As of 2017, it has a population of 7,491 across 1,589 households. The village is part of the tapedar circle of Kadhan.
