= Rip, Talhar, Badin =

Pakistani village

Rip
- Village
- Location in Sindh Rip (Pakistan)
- Coordinates: 24.789472°N 68.797387°E
- Country: Pakistan
- Region: Sindh
- District: Badin

Population (2017)
  - Total: 3,219
- Time zone: UTC+5 (PST)
  - Summer (DST): UTC+6 (PDT)

Rip is a village and Deh in the Talher taluka of Badin District, Sindh. As of 2017, it has a population of 3,219 people residing in 678 households.
