= Ahmed Rajo =

Ahmed Rajo Ahmad Rājo, Goth Ahmad Rajo
- Union Council
- Location in Sindh Ahmed Rajo (Pakistan)
- Coordinates: 24.436143°N 68.622921°E
- Country: Pakistan
- Region: Sindh
- District: Badin

Population
  - Total: 46,152
- Time zone: UTC+5 (PST)
  - Summer (DST): UTC+6 (PDT)

Ahmed Rajo is a union council in Badin District of Sindh, Pakistan, with a total population of 46,152.

On the first Sunday of every lunar month, it hosts the observance of the urs of the saint Syed Ahmed Shah Rajo, which is locally known as Sao Aacha'ar, or "Green Sunday". Several buffaloes are slaughtered, and the meat is distributed among the poor. Thousands of people from surrounding areas flock here for the occasion, bringing cooking pots and ingredients to prepare biryani along with the meat. The biryani must contain only rice and salt, with other seasonings or condiments prohibited, and it must be eaten on the shrine's premises, or else the devotee is believed to suffer misfortune and the meat will taste like donkey instead of buffalo. The urs is marked by an increase in economic activity, as locals (including many women) set up an informal market outside the shrine and sell merchandise such as crockery, cold drinks, sweets, hosiery, and chaddars. Vendors also come from other nearby villages.

The southern part of Ahmed Rajo union council is very flood-prone, lying only a few inches above sea level, and the twice-daily high tides can cause problems for local residents.
