= Allah Bux Talpur =

Pakistani politician

Member of the Provincial Assembly of Sindh
- In office 13 August 2018 – 11 August 2023
- Constituency: PS-71 Badin-II
- In office 29 May 2013 – 28 May 2018
- Constituency: PS-56 Badin-cum-Tando Muhammad Khan-II

Personal details
- Born: 17 March 1940 (age 86) Badin District, Sindh, Pakistan
- Party: PPP (1985-present)

Allah Bux Talpur is a Pakistani politician who was a member of the Provincial Assembly of Sindh, between 1985 and August 2023.

== Early life ==
He was born on 17 March 1940 in Badin District.

== Political career ==
He was elected to the Provincial Assembly of Sindh as a candidate of Pakistan Peoples Party (PPP) from Constituency PS-47 (Badin-II) in the 1985 Pakistani general election.

He ran for the seat of the Provincial Assembly of Sindh as an independent candidate from Constituency PS-47 (Badin-II) in the 1988 Pakistani general election but was unsuccessful. He received 6,769 votes and lost the seat to Bashir Hussain, a candidate of PPP.

He ran for the seat of the Provincial Assembly of Sindh as an independent candidate from Constituency PS-47 (Badin-II) in the 1990 Pakistani general election but was unsuccessful. He received 26 votes and lost the seat to Bashir Hussain, a candidate of PPP.

He was re-elected to the Provincial Assembly of Sindh as a candidate of PPP from Constituency PS-47 (Badin-II) in the 1993 Pakistani general election. He received 21,095 votes and defeated Syed Ali Bux, a candidate of Pakistan Muslim League (N) (PML-N).

He was re-elected to the Provincial Assembly of Sindh as a candidate of PPP from Constituency PS-47 (Badin-II) in the 1997 Pakistani general election. He received 11,965 votes and defeated Mir Manzoor Ahmed, a candidate of Pakistan Peoples Party (Shaheed Bhutto).

He was re-elected to the Provincial Assembly of Sindh as a candidate of PPP from Constituency PS-56 Badin-cum-T.M.Khan-II in the 2013 Pakistani general election. He received 35,738 votes and defeated Abdul Razaque, a candidate of Pakistan Muslim League (F) (PML-F).

He was re-elected to Provincial Assembly of Sindh as a candidate of PPP from Constituency PS-71 (Badin-II) in the 2018 Pakistani general election.
