= Matli =

- City
- Matli ماتلی
- Location within Sindh Location within Pakistan
- Coordinates: 25.2°N 68.39°E
- Country: Pakistan
- Province: Sindh
- Elevation: 9 m (30 ft)

Population (2023 census)
  - Total: 74,402
- Time zone: UTC+5 (PST)
- Number of towns: 1
- Number of Union councils: 2

Matli is a town of Matli Taluka in Badin District in the Sindh province of Pakistan. It is the capital of Matli Taluka, an administrative subdivision of the district. The town is located at 25°2'0N 68°39'0E with an altitude of 9 metres (32 feet) and is administratively subdivided into two Union councils.

Matli is famous for its agriculture contribution to the country. The main crops of the town are rice, cotton, sunflower and sugarcane.

== History ==
The present day Matli city was first established for habitation by the last Sassanian King Yazdegerd III in honour of his wife. Her name was either Mah Talat or Maha Talat, a daughter of vassal king of Sindh in the Sassanid Empire. Mirza Imam Ali Baig Afsar, Ph.D. in Sindhi in his book “Sindh Jee Azadari” with its translation into Urdu language book “Sindh and Ahle Bayt” writes that Monarchs of Sindh maintained friendly relations with Sassanid Kings. During Rai dynasty Yazdegerd III visited the present day city Matli in District Badin, Sindh. There he married a Sindhi princess with whom Yazdegerd had two daughters, namely Shahrbanu and Ghayan Banu respectively.

Matli served as the second Capital of the Soomra dynasty after their first Capital Mansura (Brahmanabad) got sacked by Mahmud of Ghazni. From here the Soomras rebelled against Ghaznavids around 1026 and freed Sindh from their rule. (See Soomra Rebellion of Tharri for more information)

== Demographics ==
Population

Historical population
Year	Pop.	±% p.a.
1972	17,088	—
1981	23,508	+3.61%
1998	42,909	+3.60%
2017	62,563	+2.00%
2023	74,402	+2.93%

According to 2023 census Matli city had a population of 74,402.

Languages

Languages of Matli city (2023 Census)
1. Sindhi (71.8%)
2. Punjabi (12.9%)
3. Urdu (9.60%)
4. Pashto (1.40%)
5. Hindko (1.40%)
6. Others (2.90%)
