= Gharo, Shaheed Fazil Rahu, Badin =

Gharo
- Village
- Location in Sindh Gharo (Pakistan)
- Coordinates: 24.775858°N 68.733498°E
- Country: Pakistan
- Region: Sindh
- District: Badin

Population (2017)
  - Total: 3,581
- Time zone: UTC+5 (PST)
  - Summer (DST): UTC+6 (PDT)

Gharo is a village and deh in Shaheed Fazil Rahu taluka of Badin District, Sindh. As of 2017, it has a population of 3,581, in 702 households. It is the seat of a tapedar circle, which also includes the villages of Akai, Kharach, and Koryani.
