= Tharri =

Town in the Larkana District, Sindh, Pakistan

Tharri (Sindhi: ٿري) is a town in the Larkana District in Sindh, Pakistan. The city is well connected with the other large cities like Karachi, the provincial capital and Larkana. The city is located at 26°57'10N 67°38'30E with an altitude of 24 metres (82 feet).

== See also ==
- Soomra dynasty
- Larkana
