= Kamaro, Tando Bago, Badin =

Kamaro Goth Kāmāro
- Village
- Location in Sindh Kamaro (Pakistan)
- Coordinates: 24.971058°N 69.133691°E
- Country: Pakistan
- Region: Sindh
- District: Badin

Population (2017)
  - Total: 1,471
- Time zone: UTC+5 (PST)
  - Summer (DST): UTC+6 (PDT)

Kamaro, aka Goth Kāmāro, is a village and deh in Tando Bago taluka of Badin District, Sindh. As of 2017, it has a population of 1,471, in 348 households. It is part of the tapedar circle of Dadha.
