= Bhadmi =

Bhadmi Bahadmi, Bahidmi
- Village
- Location in Sindh Bhadmi (Pakistan)
- Coordinates: 24.397353°N 68.934131°E
- Country: Pakistan
- Region: Sindh
- District: Badin

Population (2017)
  - Total: 2,874
- Time zone: UTC+5 (PST)
  - Summer (DST): UTC+6 (PDT)

Bhadmi, a.k.a. Bahadmi or Bahidmi, is a village and deh in Badin taluka of Badin District, Sindh. As of 2017, it has a population of 2,874, in 527 households. It is the seat of a tapedar circle, which also includes the villages of Chobandi, Dingher, Khalifa, Khudi, Lundo, Nareri, Palh, and Waghu Daho.
