= Saidpur =

Saidpur may refer to:

== Bangladesh ==
- Saidpur, Bangladesh, a city in Bangladesh
  - Saidpur Airport
- Saidpur Cantonment, a cantonment of the Bangladesh Army
- Saidpur Upazila, an Upazila of Nilphamari District

== India ==
- Saidpur, Badaun, a town in Uttar Pradesh
- Saidpur, Bewar, a village in Uttar Pradesh
- Saidpur, Ghazipur, a town in Uttar Pradesh
  - Saidpur (Assembly constituency), a constituency of the Uttar Pradesh Legislative Assembly
  - Saidpur (Lok Sabha constituency), a former constituency of the Uttar Pradesh Legislative Assembly
- Saidpur, Kapurthala, a village in Kapurthala district, Punjab, India

== Pakistan ==
- Saidpur, Islamabad, a village in Islamabad, Pakistan
- Saidpur, Kotli, in Azad Kashmir, Pakistan
- Saidpur, Badin, a village in Sindh
- Saidpur, Tando Muhammad Khan, a village in Sindh
