= Mena, Badin =

Mena Meno jo Goth
- Village
- Location in Sindh Mena (Pakistan)
- Coordinates: 24.956504°N 69.077008°E
- Country: Pakistan
- Region: Sindh
- District: Badin

Population (2017)
  - Total: 2,072
- Time zone: UTC+5 (PST)
  - Summer (DST): UTC+6 (PDT)

Mena, aka Mena jo Goth, is a village and deh in Tando Bago taluka of Badin District, Sindh. As of 2017, it has a population of 2,072, in 415 households. It is part of the tapedar circle of Dadha.
