= Saidpur, Badin =

Pakistani village

Saidpur Saiyidpur
- Village
- Location in Sindh Saidpur (Pakistan)
- Coordinates: 24.910874°N 68.862856°E
- Country: Pakistan
- Region: Sindh
- District: Badin

Population (2017)
  - Total: 2,433
- Time zone: UTC+5 (PST)
  - Summer (DST): UTC+6 (PDT)

Saidpur, also known as Saiyidpur, is a village and deh in Talher taluka of Badin District, Sindh, Pakistan. In 2017 it had a population of 2,433, in 470 households. Saidpur is the seat of a tapedar circle, which also includes the villages of Dabgiro, Dhoro Nero, Gono, Kandri, Kotri, and Phoosna.
