= Bhugra Memon =

- Union Council
- Location in Sindh Bhugra Memon (Pakistan)
- Coordinates: 24.405025°N 68.782701°E
- Country: Pakistan
- Region: Sindh
- District: Badin

Population (2017)
  - Total: 42,592
- Time zone: UTC+5 (PST)
  - Summer (DST): UTC+6 (PDT)

Bhugra Memon is a small town in Badin District of Sindh, Pakistan, located a few kilometres from the coast. It is the seat of a Union Council, with a total population of 42,592. The southern part of the Union Council is very flood-prone, lying only a few inches above sea level, and the twice-daily high tides can cause problems for local residents. The area is heavily beset by poverty.

Bhugra Memon was at the centre of Cyclone 02A when it hit the coast of Sindh in 1999, killing over 400 people and causing widespread destruction and displacement. Rising sea levels and disrupted weather patterns due to climate change increasingly cause problems in Bhugra Memon, as does increasing soil salinity. During the monsoon season, overflow of the Left Bank Outflow Drainage, carrying wastewater from five districts, is especially destructive. A particularly bad case of this happened in 2003.
