= Khairpur, Badin =

Khairpur Kamboh Khair, Khairpur Kamboh
- Village
- Location in Sindh Khairpur Kamboh (Pakistan)
- Coordinates: 24.879976°N 69.248001°E
- Country: Pakistan
- Region: Sindh
- District: Badin

Population (2017)
  - Total: 8,176
- Time zone: UTC+5 (PST)
  - Summer (DST): UTC+6 (PDT)

Khairpur Kamboh, aka Khairpur Kamboh or Khair, is a village and deh in Tando Bago taluka of Badin District, Sindh. As of 2017, it has a population of 8,176, in 1,500 households. It is the seat of a tapedar circle, which also includes the villages of Buhri, Chubandi, Dhoro Kaknoro, Girathri, Khanah, Phule, Miyan Sultan Ahmed, Jalal Legari and Piror. Khairpur Kamboh is also the seat of a Union Council, which has a total population of 41,119.
