= Chanri =

Chanri Chānri, Fateh Chanri
- Village
- Location in Sindh Chanri (Pakistan)
- Coordinates: 24.855863°N 68.852983°E
- Country: Pakistan
- Region: Sindh
- District: Badin

Population (2017)
  - Total: 3,121
- Time zone: UTC+5 (PST)
  - Summer (DST): UTC+6 (PDT)

Chanri, a.k.a. Fateh Chanri, is a village and deh in Talher taluka of Badin District, Sindh. As of 2017, it has a population of 3,121, in 657 households. It is the seat of a tapedar circle, which also includes the villages of Mughal Hafiz, Wasi Sajan, Weesarki, and Widh.
