= Jarki, Badin =

Jarki
- Village
- Location in Sindh Jarki (Pakistan)
- Coordinates: 25.074452°N 68.742521°E
- Country: Pakistan
- Region: Sindh
- District: Badin

Population (2017)
  - Total: 2,706
- Time zone: UTC+5 (PST)
  - Summer (DST): UTC+6 (PDT)

Jarki is a village and deh in Matli taluka of Badin District, Sindh. As of 2017, it has a population of 2,706, in 516 households. It is part of the tapedar circle of Additional Maban.
