= Terei =

Terei may refer to:

- Terei language, a language of Bougainville, Papua New Guinea
- Pio Terei (born 1958), New Zealand actor, singer and comedian
- Sonny Terei, member of the Cook Island music group Pepe and the Rarotongans

== See also ==
- Terai (disambiguation)
