= Zainab Tari =

Queen regent of Sindh

Zainab Tari Soomro

5th Sardarni-regent of Sindh
- Regency: 1089–1098
- Predecessor: Dodo I Soomro
- Successor: Sanghar Soomro
- Monarch: Dodo I (1089–1092) and Sanghar (1092–1098)
Names
- Zainab Tari binte Dodo I Soomro
- House: House of Soomar
- Dynasty: Soomra dynasty
- Father: Dodo I bin Bhungar I Soomro
- Religion: Ismaili Shia Islam

Zainab (Sindhi: زينب, romanized: Zaīnab, lit. 'a fragrant tree'; Sindhi pronunciation: [ze:n'əb]), born Zainab Tari binte Dodo I Soomro (Sindhi: زينب تاري بنت دودو اول سومرو) was the 5th Sardarni (Lady or Queen) of Soomra ruled Sindh, who ruled from 1089 till 1098. She succeeded the rule of her father Dodo I, who nominated her before he retired, as his younger son, Sanghar, was still a minor. Zainab is considered to be the second woman in the Islamic world, after Arwa al-Sulayhi, to rule over a kingdom.

== Life ==
She was the daughter of the Soomro King Asamuddin Daula Dodo Soomro of the Soomro dynasty, who ascended the throne of Sindh after the death of his father Asimuddin Bhoongar Soomro with the title Dodo-I. Since no male issue followed her, the King appointed tutors for the Princess who trained her how to rule the Kingdom and defend it from the enemies that had sacked Mansura.

King Dodo-I ruled Sindh. During this period of his rule a son was born to him whom he named Shahabuddin Sanghar. While Sanghar Soomro was still a minor, Dodo-I abdicated the throne to live a retired life. Since the Prince Shahabuddin Sanghar was a minor, the Council of Ministers and Sardars unanimously followed the wishes of their monarch and crowned Sanghar's sister Princess Zainab Tari as the ruler of Sindh.

During the rule of Zainab Tari, no foreign armies invaded Sindh, and the capital city Tharri expanded, and trade with foreign countries increased. After the tenth year of her rule, she handed over the rule to Sanghar, the king of Sindh. Tari retired to lead a family life.

== Sources ==
- Chronological dictionary of Sindh by M.H. Panhwar. 1983.
- An Illustrated Historical Atlas of Soomra Kingdom by M.H. Panhwar.
- “Tareekh-e-Sindh” (History of Sindh). By Allama Syed Sulleman Nadvi. 1947.
- “Salient Features of the Rule of Soomra Dynasty in Sindh”. Research Article by Qamar Din. M. Hayat Soomro. 2009.
