= Sardar Kamal Khan =

Pakistani politician

Member of the National Assembly of Pakistan
- In office 1 June 2013 – 31 May 2018
- Constituency: NA-224 (Badin-cum-Tando Muhammad Khan-I)

Personal details
- Born: March 12, 1972 (age 54)
- Party: Pakistan Peoples Party

Sardar Kamal Khan Chang (Urdu: سردار کمال خان چانگ; born 12 March 1972) is a Pakistani politician who had been a member of the National Assembly of Pakistan, from June 2013 to May 2018.

== Political career ==
He served as district nazim of Badin.

He was elected to the National Assembly of Pakistan as a candidate of Pakistan Peoples Party (PPP) from Constituency NA-224 (Badin-cum-Tando Muhammad Khan-I) in the 2013 Pakistani general election. He received 88,365 votes and defeated Ali Asghar Halepoto, a candidate of Pakistan Muslim League (F) (PML-F).
