= Shaheed Fazil Rahu =

SHAHEED FAZIL RAHU گولارچی GOLARCHI
- SHAHEED FAZIL RAHU
- Location within Pakistan
- Coordinates: 24°34′N 68°50′E
- Country: Pakistan
- Province: Sindh Province
- Elevation: 10 m (33 ft)
- Time zone: UTC+5 (PST)

Shaheed Fazil Rahu (also known as Golarchi) is a city in district Badin of the Sindh province, Pakistan. The old name of Golarchi was Tando Akram. It then changed to Shaheed Fazil Rahu after the murder of the peasant leader Fazil Rahu. Golarchi is famous for petroleum and natural gas. It is also an agricultural centre famous for sunflowers, paddies and sugarcane. In Golarchi, there are several oil fields in various locations. One of the main oil fields is near Kario Ghanwer. The main oil and gas field of Golarchi is located at 25 Chak on Sujawal–Badin road.

One of the biggest producers of rice and sunflower in Pakistan, it generates a reasonable revenue. Golarchi has several mills and grinding centers for rice. There are over 120 rice mills in Golarchi, including Garibsons Pvt. Ltd, Pakistan's largest rice exporter.
