= Muhammad Halepoto =

Member of the Provincial Assembly of Sindh from Badin (2024–2029)

- محمد هاليپوٽو

Member of the Provincial Assembly of Sindh
- Incumbent
- Assumed office 25 February 2024
- Constituency: PS-68 Badin-I

Personal details
- Party: PPP (2024-present)

Muhammad Halepoto (Sindhi: محمد هاليپوٽو;Urdu: محمد ہالیپوٹو) is a Pakistani politician who is member of the Provincial Assembly of Sindh.

== Political career ==
Halepoto won the 2024 Sindh provincial election from PS-68 Badin-I as a Pakistan People’s Party candidate. He received 63,348 votes while runner up Mansoor Khan Nizamani of Grand Democratic Alliance received 14,203 votes.
