= Kario =

Kario ڪڙيو
- Town
- Location within Sindh
- Coordinates: 24°48′N 68°36′E
- Country: Pakistan
- Province: Sindh

Government

Population
  - Total: 61,302
- Time zone: UTC+5 (PST)
- Calling code: 0297

Kario is a town in Sindh province of Pakistan. The name of Kario Ghanwar is mean by Kario is a river and Ghanwar is the name of Person and Father of Khalifa Mehmood Faqeer (A.S)
