= Habibullah Siddiqui =

Pakistani educationist, historian, and writer (1937–2022)

Secretary, Sindhi Adabi Board
- In office 1988–1990

Director, Bureau of Curriculum
- In office 1993–1994

Personal details
- Born: January 1, 1937 Pat Sharif, Sindh, Pakistan
- Died: October 22, 2022 (aged 85) Jamshoro, Sindh, Pakistan
- Resting place: Sindh University Graveyard, Jamshoro
- Education: M.A. (Muslim History), M.Ed., Ph.D.
- Alma mater: University of Sindh, Jamshoro
- Occupation: Educationist, historian, writer

Habibullah Siddiqui (1 January 1937 – 22 October 2022) was a Pakistani Sindhi literary, educationist, historian, research scholar and former chairman of the Sindh Textbook Board. He also served as the director of the Bureau of Curriculum in Sindh.

== Early life and education ==
Siddiqui was born on 1 January 1937 in Pat Sharif, Dadu District, Sindh. He received his primary education at a local village school and completed his matriculation in 1953. He later earned degrees including T.D., B.A., and B.T. He pursued private higher education, obtaining an M.A. in Muslim History, an M.Ed., and eventually a Ph.D. from the University of Sindh.

== Career ==
Siddiqui began his teaching career in 1953 as an English teacher. In 1962, he was promoted to senior English teacher and went on to serve as headmaster at various schools. Over the course of his career, he held several notable academic and administrative positions, including Secretary of the Sindhi Adabi Board (1988–1990), Director of the Bureau of Curriculum (1993–1994), and Chairman of the Sindh Textbook Board.

== Literary works ==
Siddiqui authored more than 35 books in Sindhi literature and education. His contributions earned him several awards and recognition within literary and educational circles.

Some of his published works include Tarikh Bab-ul-Islam Sindh (1996), Education in Sindh: Past and Present (1987), Allama I. I. Kazi (1989), Daryaa ain Samoondee Kinaran saan Zindagi (1981), Rachnaun (1986), Waaridatun (2007), Insaan ji Tareekh – Part I (2007), and Insaan ji Tareekh – Part II (2008). He also translated Makhdoom Talibul Moula's book Misriyun joon Taroon into English under the title Pieces & Sugar Candy (1997). His research work Education Problems of Pakistan with Special Reference to Sindh Province (2008) was acknowledged by the Higher Education Commission with an honorarium of Rs. 200,000. Other notable works include Kariyun Mithiyun Galhiyun (2009) and Son of the Desert (2010), a biography of Zulfikar Ali Bhutto which gained international recognition.

== Death ==
Siddiqui died on 22 October 2022 at the age of 85 due to respiratory complications at his residence in the Sindh University Housing Society. His funeral prayer was held at Quba Mosque in the same locality, and he was buried at the Sindh University Graveyard in Jamshoro.
