= Pangrio =

Town in Sindh, Pakistan

Coordinates: 24°45′50″N 69°11′55″E

- Interactive map of Pangrio
- Country: Pakistan
- Province: Sindh

Population (2023)
  - Total: 17,982

Pangrio (Sindhi: پنگریو) is a town located in the district of Badin in Sindh, Pakistan.
