= Tando Bago Tehsil =

Taluka in Sindh's Badin District

Tando Bago ٽنڊو باگو
- Union Council
- Location in Sindh Tando Bago (Pakistan)
- Country: Pakistan
- Region: Sindh
- District: Badin
- Taluka: Tando Bago

Area
  - Union Council: 1,688 km^{2} (652 sq mi)

Population (2023)
  - Union Council: 426,535
  - Density: 252.69/km^{2} (654.5/sq mi)
  - Urban: 70,092
- Time zone: UTC+4 (PST)
  - Summer (DST): UTC+5 (PDT)

Tando Bago (Sindhi: ٽنڊو باگو) is a Tehsil (Taluka) and a town in Badin District, Sindh, Pakistan. The Tehsil has a population of 426,535 in 2023. The Sindh government operates approximately 589 schools in Tando Bago.

As of 2017, the town of Tando Bago has a total population of 17,546 people, in 3,663 households.

Tando Bago is located on the left bank of the Shadiwah canal and is connected by road with Hyderabad (via Tando Muhammad Khan), Wanga Bazar, Khairpur, Pangrio, Badin, and Nindo Shaher. The area around Tando Bago is crisscrossed by many small seasonal drainage channels, which mostly derive from the Shahdadpur branch of the Indus, although some come from branches further west.

Tando Bago is home to a prominent Sheedi community, which retains a distinct identity but is also relatively impoverished, mostly living in the ghetto area of Kandri Paro and working as lowly labourers. Kandri Paro's houses are generally small and in disrepair and lack the courtyards found in other parts of town. One notable member of Tando Bago's Sheedi community was Mussafir (a pen name; His given name was Muhammad Siddiq), who Sheedis throughout Sindh venerate as a hero for working to advance the position of Sheedis in society. Mussafir's father Bilal was born in Zanzibar around 1793 and was sold into slavery; eventually he was sold to a stonemason who had just been contracted to build a fort in Tando Bago for the ruling Talpurs. Mussafir himself was born in 1879, when his father was 86 years old. He was childhood friends with Mir Ghulam Muhammad, the heir of the main Talpur ruling family, and Mussafir later persuaded him to start a high school for Sheedis in the old Talpur fort. This school was the first in Pakistan to offer education to Sheedi girls. Mussafir died in Tando Bago and his blue-and-white tomb is an important site for Sheedis in Sindh.

== City and people ==
The main tribes in Tando Bago include, Talpur, Halepota, Khuwaja (Jafferi & Ismaili Both), Lohana, Khatti, Agha Khani, Rajput, Sheedi, Soomro, Bakari, Memon, Chandio, Qureshi, Punjabi, Kaloi, Pathan, Noonari, Bhanbhro, Samoon, Mallaah, Kazi, Siyal, Solangi, Baloch, Chalgiri, Bhatti, Jokhio, Mughal, Mirza, Unar, Bughio, Umrani, Rind, Leghari tribe, Khaskheli, Rustmani, Lashari, Nizamani, Abbasi, Dal, Sand, Lakha, Uttwani’s, Jablu Abra, Jablu’s Detha, Kolhi, Meghwar, Bheel, Khosa, Magsi, Sarhandi Pir, Sindhi, Saati, Dahri, Jamali, Authelo, Brohi, Arain, Lashari, Syed, Khaledi Qureshi Pir, Malik, Bhangi, Uttwani’s hindu peoples and many Sindhi communities.

Among the people living in the city, 85 percent are native Sindhi speakers; 05 percent speak Urdu; and the other 10 percent speak a different language. A significant number of Punjabi speakers also live in nearby villages. Shoban Ali Zaur is also one of the prominent personalities of tando bago.

== History ==
Tando Bago was founded around the year 1734 by one Mir Bago Talpur. (Note: "About 140 years ago", according to the British gazetteer written in 1874) His descendants, the Bagani branch of the Talpur dynasty, remained prominent residents of the town. Tando Bago was first constituted as a municipality on 20 June 1857.

Tando Bago was historically the seat of a pargana, which covered territories that had earlier belonged to the district of Chachgan in the eastern Indus Delta.

Around 1874, Tando Bago was described as the headquarters of a taluka within the deputy collectorate of Tando Muhammad Khan, with a population of 1,033 including 568 Muslims and 465 Hindus. Most of the locals were employed either as farmers, traders, shopkeepers, goldsmiths, lahoris, servants, dyers, and washermen. There was a fairly minor local trade in rice and grain, sugar, cloth, oil, tobacco, and liquor and drugs; there was "little or no transit trade". The town was not noted for its manufactured goods. Tando Bago then had a government vernacular school, a large dharamsala maintained by the municipality, the kacheri of the taluka's Mukhtiarkar with an associated jail, and a police Thana with two officers and seven constables. The town was visited twice a year by the divisional judge on his circuit.

The 1951 census recorded the village of Tando Bago as having an estimated population of 2,099 people, in 300 houses, and covering an area of 1.1 square miles. It had a Sanitary Committee, a primary school, a high school, a police station, and a post office at that point. The deh of Tando Bago, meanwhile, included a total population of 2,485 people, in 300 houses, and an area of 3.1 square miles.

== Notable People and Places of Tando Bago ==
Tando Bago is the hometown of the notable educationist, writer, and poet Muhammad Siddique Musafir. Sahibaan Mahal is located Tando Bago Town. The Mir Ghulam Muhammad Government Boys School is one of the oldest and most historical schools in District Badin.
