= Nindo Shaher =

Pakistani town

Nindo Shaher نندو شھر
- Location within Sindh Location within Pakistan
- Coordinates: 24°38′20″N 69°02′25″E
- Country: Pakistan
- Province: Sindh
- District: Badin

Government
  - Sadar: Hussnain Mirza s/o Zulfiqar Mirza

Population (2023)
  - Total: 10,151
- Time zone: UTC+5 (PST)
- Website: Nindo Shaher Info Website

Nindo Shaher is a town and Union Council located in Badin Taluka, within the Badin District of Sindh, Pakistan. The town and area is historically linked to the Samma dynasty in 15-century Sindh. Notable settlements within the Union Council of Nindo Shaher include Siyalki, Gujjo, Panhwerki, Dasti, Khakhar, Khalso, Murkha, Angri, and Bhumbki.

== Labor/Business ==
There are 6 main rice mills in Nindo Shaher that are Qazi Rice Mills, Jafferi Rice Mills, Ahmed Rice Mills, Khaskheli Rice Mill, Hyderi Rice Mills, Memon Rice Mills. There are also 15 small mills. The ratio of business is more than labor in Nindo Shaher. The businesses are Kiryana, Tea hotels, cloth stores, carpenter, tailoring, barber, dry cleaner, iron smith, shoe maker, cabins & mechanics. Among all these, Kiryana is at the top with 140+ shops in the city.

== Shrines ==
Shrines near the town include Shaheed Mard, Dadi Rahiman, Mansar and Noor Shah.
