= Badin =

Badin بدين
- City

- Location within Sindh Location within Pakistan
- Coordinates: 24°39′26″N 68°50′26″E
- Country: Pakistan
- Province: Sindh
- District: Badin

Government
  - Type: Municipal Committee
  - Chairman: Pri Muhammad Saleh
  - Vice Chairman: Muhammad Akbar Memon
- Elevation: 10 m (33 ft)

Population (2023)
  - City: 117,455
  - Rank: 106th in Pakistan
- Time zone: UTC+5 (PKT)

Badin (Sindhi and Urdu: بدين) is the main city and capital of Badin District in Sindh, Pakistan. It lies east of the Indus River. It is the 106th largest city in Pakistan. Badin is often called 'Sugar State' due to its production of sugar.

Badin District was established in the year 1975. It comprises five Talukas: Badin, Matli, Shaheed Fazal Rahu, Talhar and Tando Bago and 46 Union Councils with 14 revenue circles, 111 Tapas and 535 dehs. This District is bordered by Hyderabad and Mirpukhas districts in the north, Tharparkar and Mirpurkhas in the east, Hyderabad and Thatta districts in the west and Kutch district of India in the south, which also forms the international boundary with India.

== History ==
Badin was the site of some military action in the late 1500s, under the Tarkhan dynasty governors of Thatta. When the governor Mirza Baqi Muhammad Tarkhan died in October 1585, a dynastic power struggle broke out. His older son Mirza Payanda Muhammad, then posted at Siwistan, was seen as unfit to rule, so most of the nobility initially backed his younger brother Mirza Muzaffar Muhamad, who was located in Badin. However, as Mirza Muzaffar hurried from Badin to Thatta to claim the throne, the nobles realised that they didn't want his maternal relatives, the Jaheja branch of the Samma tribe, so they instead sent for Payanda Muhammad's competent son Mirza Jani Beg to take over. (Note: Technically only as the wakil to Payanda Muhammad, who was nominally in charge.) Mirza Jani immediately had many of Baqi Muhammad's favourites brutally executed, which terrified Mirza Muzaffar into retreating to his power base in Badin, where he began recruiting an army to challenge his nephew. Mirza Jani then marched on Badin with an army of his own and successfully defeated his uncle, forcing him to flee to the court of Kachh. Mirza Jani then annexed Badin into his territories. A few years later in early 1592, when Mirza Jani was in revolt against the Mughal Empire, the Mughal general Abdul Rahim Khan-i-Khanan sent a division to capture Badin, which they succeeded in doing. (Note: Other divisions were also sent to Fathbagh, Jaun, Umarkot, and Thatta.)

Later, around 1614, Mir Abu al-Baqa', brother of the author Mirak Yusuf, was appointed jagirdar of Badin; he was recalled to the Mughal court by early 1615 to go on a military campaign against the Kangra Fort. According to Mirak Yusuf, Badin belonged to the sarkar of Chachgan.

The old town of Badin, which was on the western bank of the Ghari Mandhar canal, was later destroyed by the Pathan Madat Khan during his raid into Sindh. The present site, between the Ghari Mandhar and Kaziah canals, is said to have been founded around 1750 by a Hindu named Sawalo.

Badin was first incorporated as a municipality in 1857. Around 1874 it was described as just a fraction of its size before Madat Khan's raid, with an estimated population of 513 people. The population was split about equally between Hindus and Muslims. Important local industries included production of shoes, agricultural tools like spades and axes, earthenware pottery, and wooden irrigation wheels (nars). It was a major regional trade centre for rice, bajri, other cereals, ghee, sugar, molasses, cloth, metals, tobacco, animal hides, cotton, liquor, and drugs. Long-distance trade was more restricted and consisted mainly of cloth, bajri, juar, and oil. Badin was then the headquarters of the taluka's mukhtiarkar and had a kacheri and jail with police lines (with a force of 3 officers and 11 constables), a district bungalow, and a dharamsala. The town was home to several important pirs; the most important of them, Bhawan Shah, had died recently.

== Demographics ==
=== Population ===
According to 2023 census, Population of the city was 117,455.

Historical population
Year	Pop.	±% p.a.
1961	6,387	—
1972	21,939	+11.87%
1981	23,657	+0.84%
1998	62,843	+5.92%
2017	112,393	+3.11%
2023	117,455	+0.74%

Languages

Languages of Badin MC (2023 Census)
1. Sindhi (93.8%)
2. Punjabi (2.10%)
3. Urdu (1.10%)
4. Pashto (1.10%)
5. Others (1.90%)

== Climate ==
Badin has a hot semi arid climate (Köppen climate classification BSh), formerly a hot desert climate (Koppen: BWh). The climate of the district taken as a whole is moderate and is tempered by the sea breeze which blows for eight months of the year from March to October, making the hot weather somewhat cooler than for the other parts of Pakistan. During the monsoon period, the sky is cloudy and heavy rains fall, compared to the drier seasons that prevail for the rest of the year. The climate in summer is generally moist and humid. The cold weather in Badin starts from the beginning of November when a sudden change from the moist sea breeze to the dry and cold north-east wind brings about, as a natural consequence, an immediate fall in temperature.cyclones and floods are hit because of sea.

Climate data for Badin
Month	Jan	Feb	Mar	Apr	May	Jun	Jul	Aug	Sep	Oct	Nov	Dec	Year
Record high °C (°F)	36.1 (97.0)	37.2 (99.0)	42.8 (109.0)	45.6 (114.1)	49.4 (120.9)	46.7 (116.1)	43.3 (109.9)	41.1 (106.0)	42.2 (108.0)	41.7 (107.1)	38.3 (100.9)	35.6 (96.1)	49.4 (120.9)
Mean daily maximum °C (°F)	25.8 (78.4)	28.6 (83.5)	34.0 (93.2)	38.4 (101.1)	39.8 (103.6)	38.0 (100.4)	35.1 (95.2)	33.6 (92.5)	34.4 (93.9)	35.8 (96.4)	31.9 (89.4)	26.7 (80.1)	33.5 (92.3)
Daily mean °C (°F)	17.2 (63.0)	20.1 (68.2)	25.4 (77.7)	30.1 (86.2)	32.7 (90.9)	32.8 (91.0)	31.1 (88.0)	29.8 (85.6)	29.6 (85.3)	29.7 (85.5)	23.9 (75.0)	18.4 (65.1)	26.7 (80.1)
Mean daily minimum °C (°F)	8.7 (47.7)	11.6 (52.9)	16.8 (62.2)	21.8 (71.2)	25.5 (77.9)	27.5 (81.5)	27.0 (80.6)	26.1 (79.0)	24.9 (76.8)	21.7 (71.1)	15.9 (60.6)	10.1 (50.2)	19.8 (67.6)
Record low °C (°F)	−1.1 (30.0)	1.0 (33.8)	5.0 (41.0)	13.0 (55.4)	17.5 (63.5)	21.1 (70.0)	23.0 (73.4)	22.5 (72.5)	20.6 (69.1)	12.0 (53.6)	6.7 (44.1)	2.5 (36.5)	−1.1 (30.0)
Average rainfall mm (inches)	1.0 (0.04)	9.6 (0.38)	2.3 (0.09)	12.5 (0.49)	20.7 (0.81)	49.8 (1.96)	76.5 (3.01)	89.9 (3.54)	44.4 (1.75)	13.7 (0.54)	1.7 (0.07)	1.1 (0.04)	323.2 (12.72)
Source: NOAA (1961-1990)

== Education ==
The University of Sindh (2010) established a campus in the region of Badin city, called 'Laar', to provide citizens in these areas with access to education. Sindh University's Laar Campus, Badin (S.U.L.C) was established in order to provide the inhabitants of Laar region, particularly girls, with the higher education in their local area.

The campus provides facilities including a library and a computer laboratory with an Internet connection. The college offers 4-year bachelor's degree programs in Business Administration, Commerce, English and Computer Science, postgraduate diploma in Computer Science and B.Ed., M.Ed. & M.A. (Education).

As of 2013 government owned institutions of education consisted of 209 schools for boys, 102 schools for girls, 691 primary schools, 428 co-educational schools, and 15 high school and higher education schools.

== Culture ==
The city was once the centre of Sufi culture in the region. Badin's Shah Qadri Mela, (Gyarvi mean 11 in Sindi) or "Giyarwee Shareef Mela" (the Festival of Abdul-Qadir Gilani) was one of the famous festivals of Sindh that started around 1569 and ended around 1969 due to lack of support from government, and spread of Wahhabism, an orthodox version of Islam, which sees Sufism and Sufi Festivals as "threat to Islamic principles". The festival attracted more than fifty thousand people on each celebration.
