= Khaskheli =

Sindhi tribe in Pakistan

Khaskheli (Sindhi: خاصخیلي) is a Sindhi tribe in Sindh and Balochistan provinces of Pakistan. The tribe traces its linkages as an offshoot of the Samma tribe in Sindh. Khasakheli is a tribe in Sindh.

== Notable people ==
- Allah Dino Khaskheli, Pakistani classical singer
- Saeed Ghani Khaskheli, Pakistani politician
- Sawan Fakir Khaskheli, Sindhi-language poet from Pakistan
