= Badin Tehsil =

Pakistani administrative area

Badin بدین تحصیل
- Administrative subdivision (Taluka) of Badin District
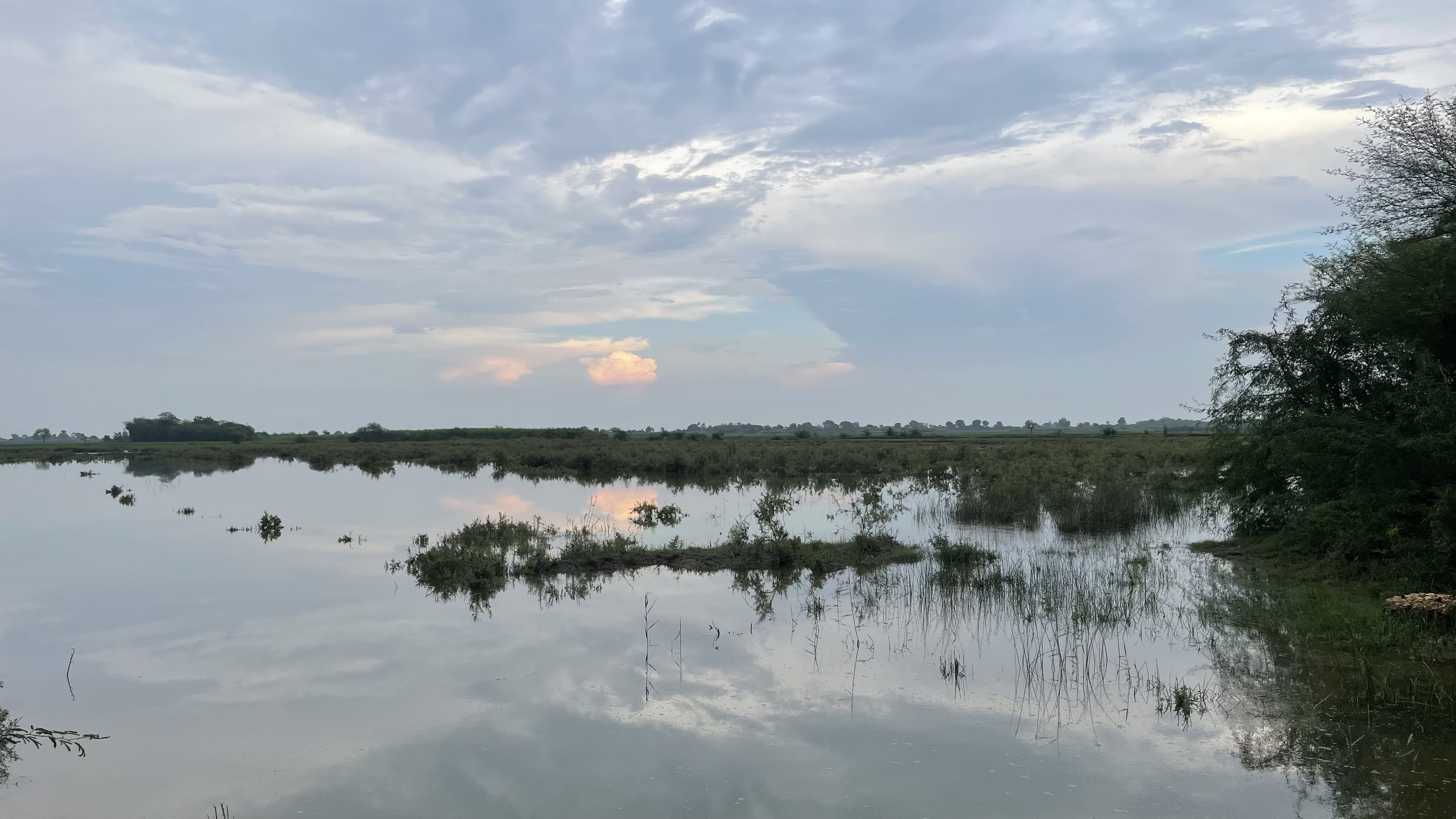
- Scenic views along the road connecting Badin and Nindo Shaher

- Location in Pakistan Badin (Pakistan)
- Coordinates: 24°39′32″N 68°55′31″E
- Country: Pakistan
- Province: Sindh
- District: Badin
- Taluka: Badin

Area
  - Administrative subdivision (Taluka) of Badin District: 1,816 km^{2} (701 sq mi)

Population (2023)
  - Administrative subdivision (Taluka) of Badin District: 490,386
  - Density: 270.0/km^{2} (699.4/sq mi)
  - Urban: 117,455 (23.95%)
  - Rural: 372,931 (76.05%)

Literacy
  - Literacy rate: 37.70%
- Time zone: UTC+5 (PST)
- Number of union councils: 12

Badin Tehsil (Sindhi: بدين) is an administrative subdivision (Taluka) of Badin District in Sindh, Pakistan. It is one of five Talukas in the district, alongside Golarchi (also known as Shaheed Fazil Rahu), Matli, Talhar, and Tando Bago.

Badin Tehsil is further divided into 12 Union Councils, including (namely Badin 1, Badin 2 and Badin 3) which together constitute the district capital, Badin. Other Union Councils in the Tehsil include Nindo Shaher and Haji Abdullah Shah.

== Demographics ==
=== Religion ===
Religions of Badin Taluka (2023 Census)
1. Islam 433,987 (88.8%)
2. Hinduism 52,336 (10.7%)
3. Christianity 1,492 (0.31%)
4. Others 907 (0.19%)
