= Soomra dynasty =

Muslim dynasty in Sindh

Soomra dynasty Sindhi: سومرا گهراڻو
- 1026–1351 (Continued in exile until 1440 in Umerkot)
- Status: Vassals of the Abbasid Caliphate (1026–1351); Tributary of the Ghaznavids (1026–1030)
- Capital: Mansura (1026); Thari (in present-day Badin District in Sindh)
- Official languages: Sindhi (in Arabic and Devanagari scripts)
- Common languages: Sindhi (native language); Arabic (liturgical language)
- Religion: Shia Ismaili
- Government: Monarchy
- History
  - Soomra dynasty begins: 1026
  - Soomra dynasty ends: 1351 (Continued in exile until 1440 in Umerkot)
Preceded by	Succeeded by
Habbari dynasty	Samma Dynasty
- Today part of: Sindh

The Soomra dynasty (Sindhi: سومرا گهراڻو, romanized: Sūmrā Gharāṇō) was a late medieval dynasty of Sindh, and at times adjacent regions, founded by the Soomro tribe, in modern-day Pakistan.

== Sources ==
The only extant source is the Diwan-i Farruhi, a Persian chronicle by Abul-Hasan Ali describing Mahmud of Ghazni's invasion (1025 AD) of Mansura, the erstwhile capital of Sindh. Contemporary coinage from Sindh is scarce and of poor quality with offset flans — while some of them can be read to contain the name of al-Zahir li-i'zaz Din Allah and al-Mustansir Billah, the Fatimid caliphs from 1021 until 1094, thereafter, they lack the name of the issuer and cannot evidence the dynasty.

== History ==
=== Establishment ===
The early history of Soomras is unclear. Ali describes the flight and eventual death by drowning of Hafif (var. Khafif), then-ruler of Sindh, during the faceoff with Mahmud but does not specify whether he was the last Habbarid or first Soomra. (Note: C. 1105, Isma'ilis of Multan had sought refuge in Mansura during Mahmud's invasion of the city and reasons for his campaign(s) against Hafif are noted to be the flourishing river trade of Isma'ilis and his (Hafif's) alliance with Jats.) Later chroniclers like Ali ibn al-Athir (c. late 12th c.) and Ibn Khaldun (c. late 14th c.) attributed the fall of Habbarids to Mahmud of Ghazni, lending credence to the argument of Hafif being the last Habbarid. The Soomras appear to have established themselves as a regional power in this vacuum.

According to André Wink, the Soomras were a dynasty of local origin, later claiming to be Rajputs as well as Arabs. They have been retrospectively claimed to be Parmar Rajputs. In Ain-i-Akbari (16th century) the Soomra dynasty is mentioned as of Rajput lineage. Some of them were adherents of Isma'ilism — Arab travelers held them to be Qarmatians, and correspondence with the Fatimid caliph, al-Mustansir Billah has been located.

=== Territory ===
The Ghurids and Ghaznavids continued to rule parts of Sindh, across the eleventh and early twelfth century, alongside Soomras. The precise delineations have yet to be discovered, but the Soomras were probably centered in lower Sindh. One of their kings Shimuddin Chamisar had submitted to Iltutmish, the Sultan of Delhi, and was allowed to continue as a vassal.

== List of Soomro rulers ==
Name	Lifespan	Reign Start	Reign End
Khafif	976-1026 (aged 49-50)	1010	1026
Soomar	998-1053 (aged 54-55)	1026	1053
Bhoongar I	1023–1068 (aged 44–45)	1053	1068
Dodo I	1046–1092 (aged 45–46)	1068	1092
Zainab Tari	1068-?	1092	1098 (as Regent)
Sanghar	1076–1107 (aged 30–31)	1092	1107
Khafif II	1087–1142 (aged 54–55)	1107	1142
Umar I	1095–1181 (aged 85–86)	1142	1181
Dodo II	1134–1195 (aged 60–61)	1181	1195
Bhoongar II	1164–1226 (aged 61–62)	1195	1226
Chanesar	1193–1237 (aged 43–44)	(1st reign) 1226	1228
Ganhwar	1200–1241 (aged 40–41)	(1st reign) 1228-	1236
Chanesar	1193–1371 (aged 43–44)	(2nd reign) 1236	1237
Ganhwar	1200–1241 (aged 40–41)	(2nd reign) 1237	1241
Muhammad Tur	1221–1256 (aged 34–35)	1241	1256
Ganhwar II	1238–1259 (aged 20–21)	1256	1259
Dodo III	1254–1273 (aged 19–20)	1259	1273
Tai	1268–1283 (aged 14–15)	1273	1283
Chanesar II	1270–1300 (aged 29–30)	1283	1300
Bhoongar III	1291–1315 (aged 23–24)	1300	1315
Khafif III	1297–1333 (aged 35–36)	1315	1333
Dodo IV	1298–1336 (aged 37–38)	1333	1336
Umar II	1315–1337 (aged 21–22)	1336	1337
Bhoongar IV	1319–1341 (aged 21–22)	1337	1341
Hamir II	1322–1351 (aged 28–29)	1341	1351

== Kingdom of Umarkot ==
Name	Lifespan	Reign Start	Reign End
Umar III	1340–1390 (aged 49–50)	1351	1390
Bhungar V	1358–1400 (aged 41–42)	1390	1400
Hamir III	1377–1440 (aged 62–63)	1400	1440

== See also ==
- List of monarchs of Sindh
- Dodo Chanesar
