= Talhar Tehsil =

Pakistani administrative area

Talhar تحصیل تلهار
- Administrative subdivision (Taluka) of Badin District
- Khaskheli
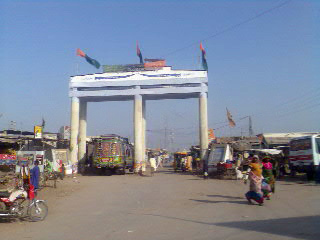
- The primary bus stop in Talhar is commonly referred to as the Badin stop.

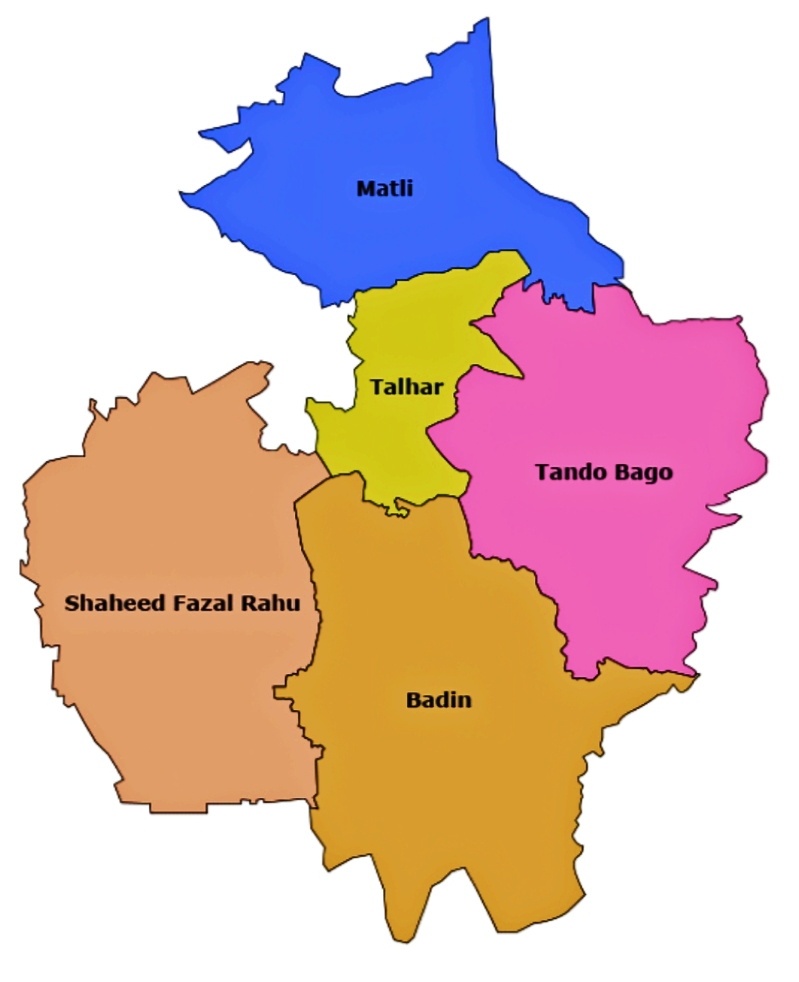

- Location within Sindh Location within Pakistan
- Coordinates: 24°53′N 68°49′E
- Country: Pakistan
- Province: Sindh
- District: Badin
- Taluka: Talhar

Government
  - Mpa: Abdul Aziz Jamali
  - Mayor: Surhan Khaskheli

Area
  - Total: 600 km^{2} (230 sq mi)
- Elevation: 15 m (49 ft)

Population (2026)
  - Total: 200,014
  - Estimate (2026): 200,014
  - Density: 302/km^{2} (780/sq mi)
- Time zone: UTC+5 (PST)
- Calling code: 72100

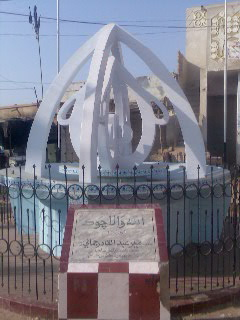
Allahwala chowk

Talhar (Urdu: تلهار) is a Tehsil (Taluka) and town in the Badin District of Sindh, Pakistan. It is situated approximately 240 kilometres east of Karachi. As of 2025 census, it has a population of 200,014. Talhar serves as a Taluka, an administratively subdivisional unit, within Badin District. The Talhar Taluka includes one town committees, Talhar, and is further organised with nine union councils.

== History ==
Badin is part of the region of the ancient heritage of the Indus Valley Civilisation, which flourished around 2500 BCE. Over the centuries, it came under the rule of several Muslim dynasties, including the Mughals. The Mughal Empire established direct control over Sindh in 1592 following the defeat of local rulers. In modern administrative history, Badin was designated as a separate district in 1975, following its separation from Hyderabad District.

== Demographics ==
Religions of Talhar Taluka (2023 Census)
1. Islam 132,449 (83.5%)
2. Hinduism 25,649 (16.2%)
3. Christianity 381 (0.24%)
4. Others 78 (0.05%)
