= Shaheed Fazil Rahu Tehsil =

Shaheed Fazil Rahu Tehsil is a tehsil in Badin district, Sindh, Pakistan. Sardar Kamal Khan Chang is the National Assembly member from this tehsil. The largest city in the tehsil is Shaheed Fazil Rahu, formally called Golarchi.
