= Matli Tehsil =

Pakistani administrative area

Matli ماتلي
- Administrative subdivision (Taluka) of Badin District
- Country: Pakistan
- Province: Sindh
- District: Badin
- Taluka: Matli

Population (2017)
  - Total: 443,412

Literacy
  - Literacy rate: 39.32%
- Time zone: UTC+5 (PST)
- Town: 1
- Number of union councils: 12

Matli (Sindhi: ماتلي) is the largest Tehsil of Badin District in the Sindh province of Pakistan. It Historically served as the second Capital of The Soomra Dynasty. It is administratively subdivided into 12 union councils.

== History ==
Matli served as the second Capital of the Soomra dynasty after their first Capital Mansura (Brahmanabad) got sacked by Mahmud of Ghazni. From here the Soomras rebelled against Ghaznavids around 1026 and freed Sindh from their rule.

== Religion ==
See the pie chart below the infobox here for religion figures:

Religions of Matli Taluka (2023 Census)
1. Islam 309,420 (65.7%)
2. Hinduism 159,631 (33.9%)
3. Christianity 1,772 (0.38%)
4. Others 277 (0.06%)
Religion in Matli taluka(2017 Census) (Note: Hinduism includes Scheduled Caste Hindus and Islam includes Ahmadiyya; which are counted separately in the Census)
1. Islam (67.6%)
2. Hinduism (32.0%)
3. Others (0.41%)
