= Badin District =

Badin District: ضلعو بدين; ضلع بدین
- District
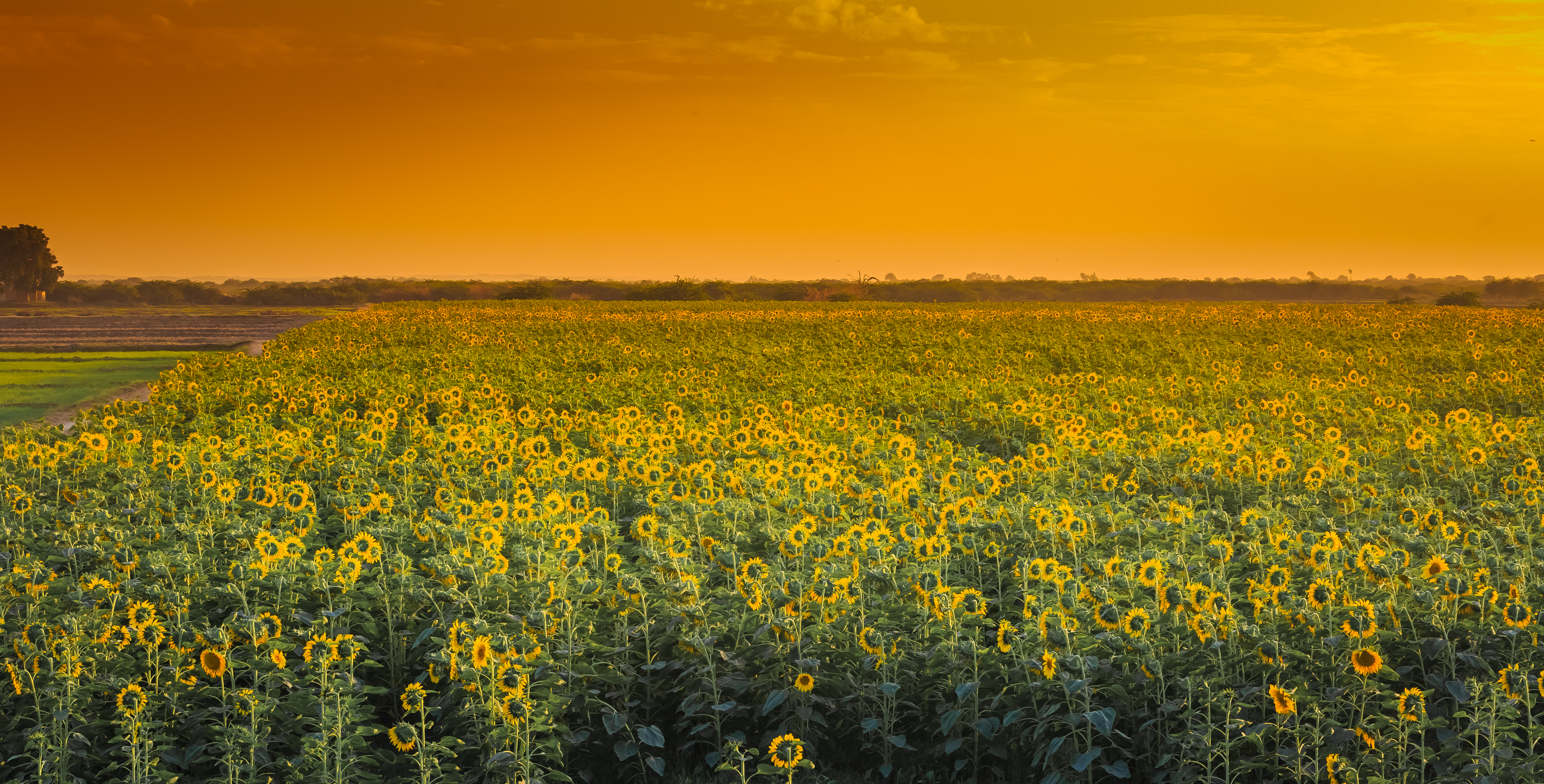
- Sunflower field in Badin district

- Badin is located in the south of Sindh
- Country: Pakistan
- Province: Sindh
- Division: Hyderabad
- Established: 1975
- Headquarters: Badin

Government
  - Type: District Administration
  - Deputy Commissioner: N/A
  - District Police Officer: N/A
  - District Health Officer: N/A

Area
  - District: 6,858 km^{2} (2,648 sq mi)

Population (2023)
  - District: 1,947,081
  - Density: 283.9/km^{2} (735.3/sq mi)
  - Urban: 429,849 (22.08%)
  - Rural: 1,517,232 (77.92%)

Literacy
  - Literacy rate: Total: 36.65%; Male: 46.46%; Female: 26.00%
- Time zone: UTC+5 (PST)
- Number of Tehsils: 6

The Badin District (Sindhi: ضلعو بدين, Urdu: ضلع بدین) is a district in the Larr Region of the Sindh province of Pakistan. The total area of the district is 6,726 square kilometers. Headquartered at the city of Badin, the district is situated between 24°-5` to 25°-25` north latitude and 68 21’ to 69 20’ east longitude and is bounded on the north by the Tando Allahyar District, on the northwest by Hyderabad District, on the east by Mirpur Khas and Tharparkar districts, on the south by the Kutch district of India, and on the west by Sujawal and Tando Muhammad Khan districts.

== History ==
Badin was one of the centers of the ancient Indus Valley civilization.

Matli of Badin served as the second Capital of the Soomra dynasty after their first Capital Mansura (Brahmanabad) got sacked by Mahmud of Ghazni. From here the Soomras rebelled against Ghaznavids around 1026 and freed Sindh from their rule. (See Soomra Rebellion of Tharri for more information)

The areas remained under the control of the Soomras and Sammas until In 1592, Sindh came under the direct rule of the Mughal emperors.

In 1975, Badin District was established after the bifurcation of Hyderabad District.

== Demographics ==
Historical population
Year	Pop.	±% p.a.
1951	273,398	—
1961	353,232	+2.60%
1972	640,718	+5.56%
1981	813,335	+2.69%
1998	1,193,081	+2.28%
2017	1,804,958	+2.20%
2023	1,947,081	+1.27%

As of the 2023 census, Badin district has 397,892 households and a population of 1,947,081. The district has a sex ratio of 108.42 males to 100 females and a literacy rate of 36.65%: 46.46% for males and 26.00% for females. 625,549 (32.16% of the surveyed population) are under 10 years of age. 429,849 (22.08%) live in urban areas.

=== Religion ===
Religions in Badin district (2023)
Religion	Percent
Islam	74.45%
Hinduism	25.11%
Other	0.44%

The majority religion is Islam, with 74.45% of the population. Hinduism (including those from Scheduled Castes) is practiced by 25.11% of the population.

Religion in contemporary Badin district
Religious group	1941 (Note: Note: 1941 census data is for Badin, Dero Mohbat and Tando Bago taluks and part of Guni taluk of Hyderabad district and part of Jati taluk of erstwhile Karachi district, which roughly corresponds to contemporary Badin District. Figures for current Golarchi taluka were obtained from ratios of 1951 census figures of current taluka boundaries to total taluka populations. District and taluk borders have changed since 1961.)		2017		2023	
Religious group	Pop.	%	Pop.	%	Pop.	%
Islam	202,367	77.06%	1,373,704	76.11%	1,448,447	74.45%
Hinduism	59,070	22.49%	426,142	23.61%	488,523	25.11%
Sikhism	1,097	0.42%	—N/a	—N/a	27	0%
Christianity	91	0.03%	3,504	0.19%	5,212	0.27%
Others (Note: Including Jainism, Christianity, Buddhism, Zoroastrianism, Judaism, Ad-Dharmis, or not stated)	1	~0%	1,608	0.09%	3,208	0.17%
Total Population	262,626	100%	1,804,958	100%	1,945,417	100%

=== Language ===
Languages of Badin district (2023)
1. Sindhi (93.9%)
2. Punjabi (2.80%)
3. Others (3.30%)

At the time of the 2023 census, 93.85% of the population spoke Sindhi, 2.75% Punjabi, and 3.34 Others as their first language.

== Administration ==
=== List of Tehsils ===
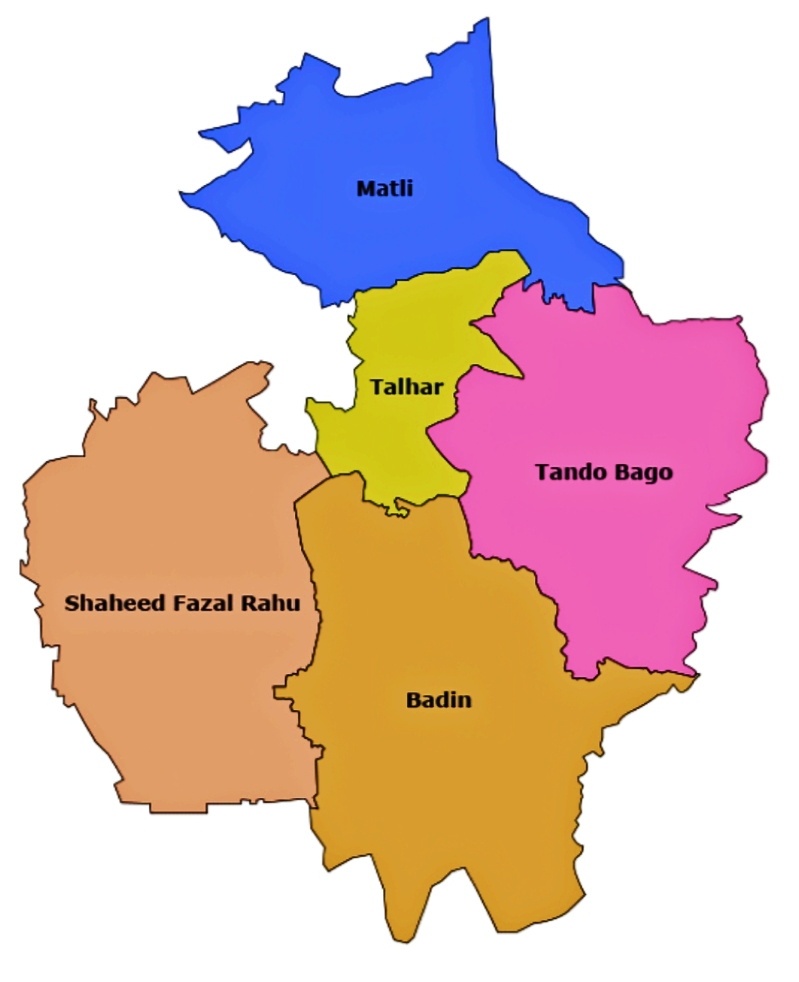
Map of Badin District's tehsils

The district is administratively subdivided into the following tehsil:

Tehsil	Area (km^{2})	Pop. (2023)	Density (ppl/km^{2}) (2023)	Literacy rate (2023)
Badin Tehsil	1,816	490,386	270.04	37.70%
Matli Tehsil	1,143	471,100	412.16	39.32%
Shaheed Fazil Rahu Tehsil (Golarchi Tehsil)	1,642	374,854	228.29	33.50%
Talhar Tehsil	569	184,206	323.74	34.16%
Tando Bago Tehsil	1,688	426,535	252.69	36.17%

With the introduction of the devolution system, the talukas have been subdivided into the Union Councils numbering 49, Tapas 109 and Dehs 511.

=== List of Union Councils ===
Badin District includes the following Union Councils:

UC Name	Population
Badin-I	41,795
Badin-II	42,984
Badin-III	45,928
Muhammad Khan Bhurgri	38,991
Kadi Kazia	38,456
Luari Sharif	33,557
Nindo	43,601
Haji Abdullah Shah	44,627
Mithi-III	44,485
Kadhan	39,531
Seerani	43,200
Bhugra Memon	42,592
Matli-I	44,098
Matli-II	35,373
Phalkara	45,949
Malhan	45,538
Haji Sawan	34,115
Manik Laghari	45,953
Thari	47,682
Tando Ghulam Ali	42,018
Ghulab Laghari	33,953
Dumbalo	52,212
Helepota	45,241
Budho Qambrani	53,555
Tando Bago	32,709
Pahar Marri	34,208
Chhabralo	37,551
Khadhero	45,320
Dadah	37,000
Khoski	39,757
Dei Jerkis	41,454
Khalifo Qasim	37,595
Pangrio	38,897
Khairpur Ghumbo	41,119
Golarchi/Fazal Rahu	39,927
Ahmed Rajo	46,152
Rahuki	29,996
Kario Ghanwhar	26,849
Tarai	46,005
Gharo	38,546
Khorwah	39,475
Dubi	39,975
Talhar	39,658
Peeroo Lashari	47,020
Saeed Pur	45,157
Rajo Khanani	49,000

In 2013, the number of union councils in the district was increased to 68.

=== List of Dehs ===
The following is a list of Badin District's 511 dehs, organised by taluka:

- Badin Taluka (142 dehs)
  - Abri
  - Achh
  - Achhro
  - Akro
  - Aminariro
  - Andhalo
  - Angri
  - Babralo-under sea
  - Badin
  - Baghar
  - Bagreji
  - Bakho Khudi
  - Bandho
  - Bano
  - Behdmi
  - Bhambhki
  - Bhaneri
  - Bidhadi
  - Bijoriro
  - Bokhi
  - Booharki
  - Borandi
  - Buxa
  - Chandhadi
  - Chanesri
  - Charo
  - Cheerandi
  - Chhel
  - Chobandi
  - Chorhadi
  - Chorhalo
  - Daleji
  - Dandhi
  - Daphri
  - Dasti
  - Dhandh
  - Dharan
  - Dheenghar
  - Doonghadi
  - Gabarlo
  - Gad
  - Gagro
  - Ghurbi
  - Githo
  - Gujjo
  - Gurho
  - Jakhralo
  - Jakhri
  - Janath
  - Janjhli
  - Janki
  - Jhagri
  - Jhalar
  - Jhol khasi
  - Jhurkandi
  - Kadhan
  - Kadi kazia
  - Kahlifa
  - Kak
  - Kalhori
  - Kamaro
  - Kand
  - Kandri
  - Karabhari
  - Keerandi
  - Khakhar
  - Khalso
  - Khambro
  - Kheerdahi
  - Khudi
  - Khurhadi
  - Khuro
  - Kumbhairo
  - Kunar
  - Lohan
  - Lao
  - Lareri
  - Loon Khan
  - Luari Sharif
  - Lundo
  - Majja Basri
  - Makhandi
  - Makra
  - Malki
  - Marai
  - Mard
  - Markhan
  - Mirzapur
  - Mithi
  - Mithi-2
  - Mithi-3
  - More
  - Moreri
  - Morhadi
  - Moro
  - Nangarkhet
  - Nangro
  - Nareri
  - Nindo Shaher
  - Odha
  - Ojhri
  - Padhar
  - Pado
  - Pahori
  - Pakhothar
  - Palh
  - Panchi
  - Panhwarki
  - Pano
  - Pano Baeed
  - Pano Baqir
  - Pano Lundki
  - Pano Mir Khan
  - Patar
  - Pateji
  - Patiari
  - Qaimpur
  - Rat
  - Roonghadi
  - Sando
  - Sanghar
  - Sanjra
  - Sarahadi
  - Saroro
  - Seerani
  - Setha
  - Sheikhpur
  - Sialki
  - Siantri
  - Siarsi
  - Singari
  - Sonhar
  - Sutiari
  - Tali
  - Thath
  - Vidhri
  - Wagodaho
  - Wahryaro
  - Waryaso
- Matli Taluka (98 dehs)
  - Aghamano
  - Ali pur
  - Amarlo
  - Arain
  - Bambhnai
  - Baran
  - Barasar
  - Bediro
  - Bhadari
  - Buhro Jagir
  - Buhro Rayati
  - Chakra
  - Chan Ganga
  - Chansonrani
  - Chan-sorahadi
  - Chaogazo
  - Choretani
  - Dasti
  - Dadhar
  - Dakaro
  - Dariri
  - Daro sendi
  - Deero muhabat
  - Dembyari
  - Dhabhi
  - Dilo-dero
  - Diyal
  - Doomani
  - Dumbalo
  - Gari Bhri
  - Ghari Lundi
  - Gharo
  - Gharo Sarmast
  - Gopalo
  - Gorano
  - Gujo
  - H. Karam Ali
  - Hanjar
  - Jarki
  - Jehajani
  - Juneja
  - Kalwari
  - Kandrahki
  - Kangni
  - Kanheri
  - Kari Muhammad Ali
  - Kari sain Dad
  - Kariyano
  - Kathore
  - Keenjhar
  - Khaberlo
  - Khachar
  - Khad Khuhi
  - Khairwah
  - Khareri
  - Khari, Sindh
  - Khariyon
  - Khathore
  - Khori
  - Khudi
  - Labni
  - Lakhadi
  - Lanyari
  - Lorer
  - Lundano
  - Maban
  - Malhan
  - Mangria
  - Matli
  - More
  - Morhadi
  - Nathu
  - Pabni
  - Padhar
  - Paee
  - Paniro
  - Panjm Hisso
  - Phulejani
  - Rain
  - Rohiro
  - Sando
  - Saonro
  - Sehrat
  - Senhor
  - Sikni
  - Sita
  - Sore
  - Sorhadi
  - Sun
  - T.G Ali`
  - Talho
  - Talhyari
  - Tali
  - Thari
  - Udhejani
  - Vee
  - Waghrayi
  - Wanji
- Shaheed Fazil Rahu Taluka (97 dehs)
  - Agri
  - Ahmed rajo-1
  - Ahmed rajo-2
  - Ahmed rajo-3
  - Ahmed rajo-4
  - Ahmed rajo-5
  - Ahmed rajo-6
  - Akai
  - Akri Jagir
  - Akri-1
  - Akri-2
  - Aseli
  - Bari
  - Barodari
  - Bukerani
  - Cahkari
  - Chachh
  - Dadharko
  - Dandho
  - Dasarki
  - Dubi
  - Fatehpur
  - Ghanwarah
  - Gharo
  - Girhari-1
  - Girhari-2
  - Girhari-3
  - Girhari-4
  - Girhari-5
  - Githo
  - Golarchi
  - Gujhari
  - Jakheji 1 & 2
  - Jhabiro
  - Jhol
  - Jhol-2
  - Jhole-1
  - Jhole-2
  - Jhole-3
  - Jhole-4
  - Jhole-5
  - Jhole-6
  - Kadh
  - Kaheki
  - Kakejani
  - Kand
  - Kandeyari
  - Kario 1 & 2
  - Khathar
  - Kharch
  - Khareyoon
  - kharoDabo
  - Khebrani
  - Kheeryoon
  - Khero Bhataro
  - Khersari
  - Khorwah
  - Khudh
  - Kinder Jageer
  - Koryani
  - Lakhi
  - Lakri
  - Lashkarnani
  - Lorhad
  - Malira
  - Mariwasayo-1
  - Mariwasayo-2
  - Maroo jat
  - Minyoon
  - Mitho Dabo
  - Miyano Karrath
  - Mukhdoompur
  - Mulki
  - Narri
  - Narbut
  - Nohiki
  - Nukarji-1
  - Nuqarji-2
  - Odherki
  - Padheryoon
  - Patihal
  - Phitoon
  - Rahuki
  - Rari-1
  - Rari-2
  - Rari-3
  - Rari-4
  - Rari-5
  - Rip
  - Saleh abad
  - Samki
  - Shekhano
  - Sodhki
  - Sorhadi
  - Suteyari
  - Tajhedi
  - Tarai
  - Walhar
- Talher Taluka (55 dehs)
  - Bagerki
  - Baghlani
  - Bhetaro
  - Bohrro I
  - Bohrro II
  - Bohrro III
  - Bohrro IV
  - Chachari
  - Chanri
  - Chick
  - Dabgro
  - Dabhrro
  - Dato Jamali
  - Daurung
  - Dedki
  - Doro Nero
  - Dourmano
  - Gaheki
  - Golarri
  - Gonho
  - Kanderi
  - Khanoat
  - Kocho Sajan Sawai
  - Kohar
  - Koteri
  - Lundki
  - More
  - Morjhar
  - Mughal Hafiz
  - Munahaiki
  - Nar
  - Nawabed
  - Paathroon
  - Perharki
  - Phosana
  - Phulhadion
  - Raheji
  - Rembhan
  - Rip
  - Rojherlei
  - Saidpur
  - Sajan
  - Sajan pur
  - Sandhki
  - Sausi
  - Seri
  - Shakani
  - Shorki
  - Talhar
  - Vassarki
  - Vidh
  - Vidh
  - Walhar
  - Wasi Adil
  - Wasi Sajjan
- Tando Bago Taluka (110 dehs)
  - Adori
  - Ahmedani
  - Akore
  - Ali abad
  - Amar Nar
  - Aqil
  - Bagh Shahmir
  - Banghar
  - Baxo Kaloi
  - Beero Weran
  - Belaro
  - Bhryoon
  - Bohri
  - Chandheli-1
  - Chandheli-11
  - Chandheli-111
  - Changho
  - Char
  - Charvo
  - Chavra
  - Chhabralo
  - Chhachh
  - Chhan
  - Choubandi
  - Dadah
  - Dambharlo
  - Dando
  - Dei
  - Dei jarkas
  - Dhanjol
  - Dhoro Kaka Noro
  - Dhubni
  - Digh
  - Domhar
  - Duz
  - Fateh Pur
  - Fato Qambrani
  - Gad
  - Gaheji
  - Girathri
  - Gujo
  - Hajar Hadi
  - Hameera
  - Har
  - Higorjani
  - Hothair
  - Jal Mori
  - Jesar
  - Kahdharo
  - Kak-1
  - Kak-11
  - Kak-111
  - Kamaro
  - Kang
  - Kangpir
  - Kapoori
  - Kariyano
  - Katadaho
  - Katal
  - Khadi Adat
  - Khado
  - Khahi Beero
  - Khairpur
  - Khalso
  - Khanah
  - Khari Khabarlo
  - Kheerdahi
  - Kherol
  - Khoro
  - Khoski
  - Khureri
  - Korahi
  - Liar
  - Machandi
  - Machori
  - Mato
  - Mena
  - Mesadi
  - Mohna
  - Morahadi
  - Moro
  - Motna
  - Oil Pur
  - Panu Nau
  - Pharho
  - Phull
  - Phyari
  - Pir Misri
  - Piror
  - Potho
  - Potho Nar
  - Rail Tarai
  - Rajori-1
  - Rajori-111
  - Ropari
  - Saddiq
  - Sangi
  - Senhaho
  - Sonhar
  - Sonhari
  - Tando Bago
  - Tayab Sehto
  - Thorki
  - Thorlo
  - Thui
  - Tori
  - Toryano
  - Uanrki
  - Vee Bahadur
  - Waghdahi

== Education ==
The University of Sindh Laar Campus offers 4- year (8- Semester) bachelor's degree programs in Business Administration, Commerce and Computer Science, PGD. Computer Science and B.Ed., M.Ed. & M.A. (Education).

- Cadet College Badin
- Govt. Islamia Degree College Badin
- Govt. Girls College Badin
- Govt. Pakistan College Saeedpur Badin
- Govt. Elementary College of Education Badin
- Nursing College Badin
- Government Polytechnic Institute Badin
- Govt. Mono Technical Institute S.F Rahu
- Army Public School & College Badin
- National School & College Badin

== Economy ==
Nearly 78% of the population lives in the rural areas with farming as the main source of livelihood. The district is irrigated by Indus River through the Akram Wah, Phuleli and Guni Canals of Kotri Barrage and Nasir Canal of Sukkur Barrage. Main Crops are Sugar Cane, Rice, Tomato, Wheat and Sunflower. There are six Sugar Mills and 30 Rice Husking mills in the District. The Oil fields in the Badin district produces nearly 50% of total production of crude oil of Pakistan.

=== Railways ===
The main line runs from Badin to Hyderabad through the Matli taluka.

=== Badin Coal Field ===
Spread at the area of 1,110sq.km, 'Badin Coal Field' reserves around 1.358 billion metric tons of coal.

== See also ==
- Divisions of Pakistan
- Tehsils of Pakistan
  - Tehsils of Punjab, Pakistan
  - Tehsils of Khyber Pakhtunkhwa, Pakistan
  - Tehsils of Balochistan, Pakistan
  - Tehsils of Sindh, Pakistan
  - Tehsils of Azad Kashmir
  - Tehsils of Gilgit-Baltistan
- Districts of Pakistan
  - Districts of Khyber Pakhtunkhwa, Pakistan
  - Districts of Punjab, Pakistan
  - Districts of Balochistan, Pakistan
  - Districts of Sindh, Pakistan
  - Districts of Azad Kashmir
  - Districts of Gilgit-Baltistan
