= Hyderabad Division =

Administrative division of Sindh

Coordinates: 25°15′N 68°45′E

Hyderabad Division حیدر آباد ڈویژن حيدرآباد ڊويزن
- Division
- Map of Hyderabad Division
- Country: Pakistan
- Province: Sindh
- Capital: Hyderabad
- Established: 1 July 1970; 56 years ago
- Districts: 9: Badin Dadu Hyderabad Jamshoro Matiari Sujawal Tando Allahyar Tando Muhammad Khan

Government
  - Type: Divisional Administration
  - Commissioner: Khalid khaskheli

Area
  - Division: 64,963 km^{2} (25,082 sq mi)
- Elevation: 13 m (43 ft)

Population (2023 Pakistani census)
  - Division: 11,657,249
  - Density: 179.44/km^{2} (464.76/sq mi)
  - Urban: 4,346,036 (37.28%)
  - Rural: 7,313,210
- Demonym: Hyderabadi
- Time zone: UTC+5 (PKT)
- Postal code: 71000
- Dialling code: 022
- ISO 3166 code: PK-SD

Hyderabad Division (Sindhi: حيدرآباد ڊويزن) is an administrative division of the Sindh Province of Pakistan. It was abolished in 2000 but restored again on 11 July 2011. CNIC code of Hyderabad Division is 41. Hyderabad is the divisional headquarters of Hyderabad Division.

== History ==
Hyderabad was part of Bombay Presidency from 1843 to April 1, 1936.

Then it became part of Sind province from 1 April 1936 to 14 October 1955.

14 October 1955, it became part of West Pakistan and remained until 1 July 1970.

After that, West Pakistan province divided into 4 provinces and Hyderabad District upgraded to Hyderabad Division of Sindh Province of Pakistan on 1 July 1970.

Hyderabad Division was dissolved in 2000, the division comprised the districts of Badin, Hyderabad and Tando Allahyar.

On 11 July 2011, Sindh government restored again Hyderabad Division.

On 6 June 2014, Hyderabad Division further divided to create Shaheed Benazirabad Division.

== Demographics ==
In the 2023 Pakistani census, Hyderabad Division had a population of 10.16 millions (total 11,657,249) consists of 60,30,741 males & females 5,625,967.

Languages

Languages of Hyderabad Division (2023 Pakistani census)
1. Sindhi (83.4%)
2. Urdu (11.1%)
3. Punjabi (1.71%)
4. Pashto (1.07%)
5. Others (2.76%)

There were 9,717,871 Sindhi, 1,290,005 Urdu, 199,809 Punjabi, 125,391 Pashto, and various Others diverse communities such as Balochi,Saraiki,Brahui etc.

During colonial rule, the Erstwhile division was a district of Sind in what was then the Bombay Presidency of British India. The population of the district increased by 47% between 1872 and 1901. The total population according to the census were 677,994 in 1872, 703,637 in 1881, 861,994 in 1891 and 989,030 in 1901.

Taluka	Population (1901)
Guni	91,506
Badin	81,790
Tando Bago	74,876
Dero Mohbat	46,919
Hyderabad	138,021
Tando Alahyar	87,990
Shahdadpur	73,504
Hala	98,230
Sakrand	64,036
Moro	66,641
Naushahro	97,506
Kandiaro	62,937
Nusrat (Nawabshah)	5,074

== List of the districts by population over the years ==
Districts of Hyderabad Division							
District	Population 2023	Population 2017	Population 1998	Population 1981	Population 1972	Population 1961	Population 1951
Dadu	1,742,320	1,550,266	1,106,717	705,669	556,669	342,939	295,402
Hyderabad	2,432,540	2,199,463	1,494,866	1,005,460	814,060	537,000	319,232
Jamshoro	1,117,308	993,142	582,094	375,942	254,318	144,228	123,561
Matiari	849,383	769,349	494,244	438,319	336,367	148,995	124,948
Tando Allahyar	922,012	836,887	493,526	329,370	256,994	140,259	106,267
Tando Muhammad Khan	726,119	677,228	438,624	...	...	...	...
Badin District	1,947,081	1,804,958	1,193,081	813,335	640,718	353,232	273,398
Thatta District	1,083,191	982,138	599,492	...	...	...	...
Sujawal District	839,292	779,062	513,702	...	...	...	...
Totals	11,659,246	10,592,635	6,829,537	2,854,760	2,218,408	1,313,421	969,410

== List of the districts by area, population, density, literacy rate etc. ==
#	District	Headquarter	Area (km²)	Pop. (2023)	Density (ppl/km²) (2023)	Lit. rate (2023)
1	Jamshoro	Jamshoro	11,204	1,117,308	99.7	49.63%
2	Hyderabad	Hyderabad	993	2,432,540	2,448.7	67.21%
3	Badin	Badin	6,858	1,947,081	284.6	36.65%
4	Dadu	Dadu	7,866	1,742,320	221.8	47.13%
5	Matiari	Matiari	1,417	849,383	599.0	45.88%
6	Sujawal	Sujawal	8,785	839,292	95.5	27.02%
7	Tando Allahyar	Tando Allahyar	1,554	922,012	592.8	39.80%
8	Tando Muhammad Khan	Tando Muhammad Khan	1,423	726,119	509.1	34.02%
9	Thatta	Thatta	8,570	1,083,191	126.8	26.88%

== List of the Tehsils ==
Tehsil	Area (km²)	Population (2023)	Density (ppl/km²) (2023)	Literacy rate (2023)	Districts
Badin Tehsil	1,816	490,386	270.04	37.7%	Badin District
Matli Tehsil	1,143	471,100	412.16	39.32%	Badin District
Shaheed Fazil Rahu Tehsil	1,642	374,854	228.29	33.50%	Badin District
Talhar Tehsil	569	184,206	323.74	34.16%	Badin District
Tando Bago Tehsil	1,688	426,535	252.69	36.17%	Badin District
Jati Tehsil	3,489	214,710	61.54	23.13%	Sujawal District
Kharo Chan Tehsil	778	11,403	14.66	6.98%	Sujawal District
Mirpur Bathoro Tehsil	698	231,735	332	32.01%	Sujawal District
Shah Bandar Tehsil	3,074	168,911	54.95	15.97%	Sujawal District
Sujawal Tehsil	746	212,533	284.90	35.02%	Sujawal District
Ghorabari Tehsil	1,018	198,920	195.40	19.89%	Thatta District
Keti Bunder	771	63,217	81.99	12.86%	Thatta District
Mirpur Sakro Tehsil	2,958	376,078	127.14	27.95%	Thatta District
Thatta Tehsil	3,823	444,976	116.39	30.90%	Thatta District
Dadu Tehsil	846	508,607	601.19	64.39%	Dadu District
Johi Tehsil	3,509	333,179	94.95	30.25%	Dadu District
Khairpur Nathan Shah Tehsil	2,583	379,975	147.11	43.42%	Dadu District
Mehar Tehsil	928	520,559	560.95	43.05%	Dadu District
Hyderabad City Tehsil	43	778,132	18,096.09	73.74%	Hyderabad District
Hyderabad Tehsil	711	511,265	719.08	42.57%	Hyderabad District
Latifabad Tehsil	204	800,983	3,926.39	74.04%	Hyderabad District
Qasimabad Tehsil	35	342,160	9,776.00	71.32%	Hyderabad District
Kotri Tehsil	1,051	472,003	244.10	57.50%	Jamshoro District
Sehwan Tehsil	2,160	322,011	149.08	41.91%	Jamshoro District
Manjhand Tehsil	2,303	161,794	70.28	35.19%	Jamshoro District
Thana Bulla Khan Tehsil	5,690	161,500	28.39	55.19%	Jamshoro District
Hala Tehsil	488	286,155	586.38	52.58%	Matiari District
Matiari Tehsil	568	377,945	665.40	39.64%	Matiari District
Saeedabad Tehsil	361	185,283	513.25	48.11%	Matiari District
Chamber Tehsil	483	233,424	483.28	29.96%	Tando Allahyar District
Jhando Mari Tehsil	626	266,665	425.98	36.68%	Tando Allahyar District
Tando Allahyar Tehsil	445	421,923	948.14	46.83%	Tando Allahyar District
Bulri Shah Karim Tehsil	770	247,027	320.81	27.15%	Tando Muhammad Khan District
Tando Ghulam Hyder Tehsil	390	206,665	529.91	30.26%	Tando Muhammad Khan District
Tando Muhammad Khan Tehsil	263	272,427	1,035.84	42.70%	Tando Muhammad Khan District

== Constituencies ==
Provincial Assembly Constituency	National Assembly Constituency	District
PS-56 Matiari-I	NA-216 Matiari	Matiari
PS-57 Matiari-II	NA-216 Matiari	Matiari
PS-58 Tando Allahyar-I	NA-217 Tando Allahyar	Tando Allahyar
PS-59 Tando Allahyar-II	NA-217 Tando Allahyar	Tando Allahyar
PS-60 Hyderabad-I	NA-218 Hyderabad-I	Hyderabad
PS-61 Hyderabad-II	NA-218 Hyderabad-I	Hyderabad
PS-62 Hyderabad-III	NA-219 Hyderabad-II	Hyderabad
PS-63 Hyderabad-IV	NA-219 Hyderabad-II	Hyderabad
PS-64 Hyderabad-V	NA-220 Hyderabad-III	Hyderabad
PS-65 Hyderabad-VI	NA-220 Hyderabad-III	Hyderabad
PS-66 Tando Muhammad Khan-I	NA-221 Tando Muhammad Khan	Tando Muhammad Khan
PS-67 Tando Muhammad Khan-II	NA-221 Tando Muhammad Khan	Tando Muhammad Khan
PS-77 Jamshoro-I	NA-226 Jamshoro	Jamshoro
PS-78 Jamshoro-II	NA-226 Jamshoro	Jamshoro
PS-79 Jamshoro-III	NA-226 Jamshoro	Jamshoro
PS-80 Dadu-I	NA-227 Dadu-I	Dadu
PS-81 Dadu-II	NA-227 Dadu-I	Dadu
PS-82 Dadu-III	NA-228 Dadu-II	Dadu
PS-83 Dadu-IV	NA-228 Dadu-II	Dadu
PS-68 Badin-I	NA-222 Badin-I	Badin
PS-69 Badin-II	NA-222 Badin-I	Badin
PS-70 Badin-III	NA-222 Badin-I	Badin
PS-70 Badin-III	NA-223 Badin-II	Badin
PS-71 Badin-IV	NA-223 Badin-II	Badin
PS-72 Badin-V	NA-223 Badin-II	Badin
PS-73 Sujawal-I	NA-224 Sujawal	Sujawal
PS-74 Sujawal-II	NA-224 Sujawal	Sujawal
PS-75 Thatta-I	NA-225 Thatta	Thatta
PS-76 Thatta-II	NA-225 Thatta	Thatta

== See also ==
- Divisions of Pakistan
  - Divisions of Punjab, Pakistan
  - Divisions of Khyber Pakhtunkhwa
  - Divisions of Balochistan
  - Divisions of Sindh
  - Divisions of Azad Kashmir
  - Divisions of Gilgit-Baltistan
- Districts of Pakistan
  - Districts of Punjab, Pakistan
  - Districts of Khyber Pakhtunkhwa
  - Districts of Balochistan
  - Districts of Sindh
  - Districts of Azad Kashmir
  - Districts of Gilgit-Baltistan
