= Zulfiqarabad =

Coordinates: 28°17′N 68°05′E

Zulfiqarabad (Urdu: ذُوالفقارآباد), is a proposed new city in Thatta District, Sindh, Pakistan around 150 kilometers south-east from Karachi.

Zulfiqarabad Development Authority was set up in 2010 to establish and operate the city. The same year 60,000 acres (242 square kilometre) of land was identified by the Government of Sindh in Southern Sindh. The proposal further states an establishment of a port in Keti Bandar to be connected to the city. The project is likely to be expanded to 1.32 million acres of land across four talukas of Thatta district, Jati, Shah Bunder, Keti Bunder, and Kharo Chan. Authorities plan to reclaim 0.967 million acres of land from the sea.

According to IUCN, the project would likely have a negative impact on Marho Kotri Wildlife Sanctuary. Left wing groups have identified four talukas of Thatta, 480 villages, six archaeological sites, 17 creeks of the Indus delta, 223 kilometers of a coastal belt, and over 400,000 people at risk of displacement.

== See also ==
- Karachi
- Port Qasim
- Shahbandar (Pakistan)
