= List of tehsils of Sindh =

Tehsils of Sindh
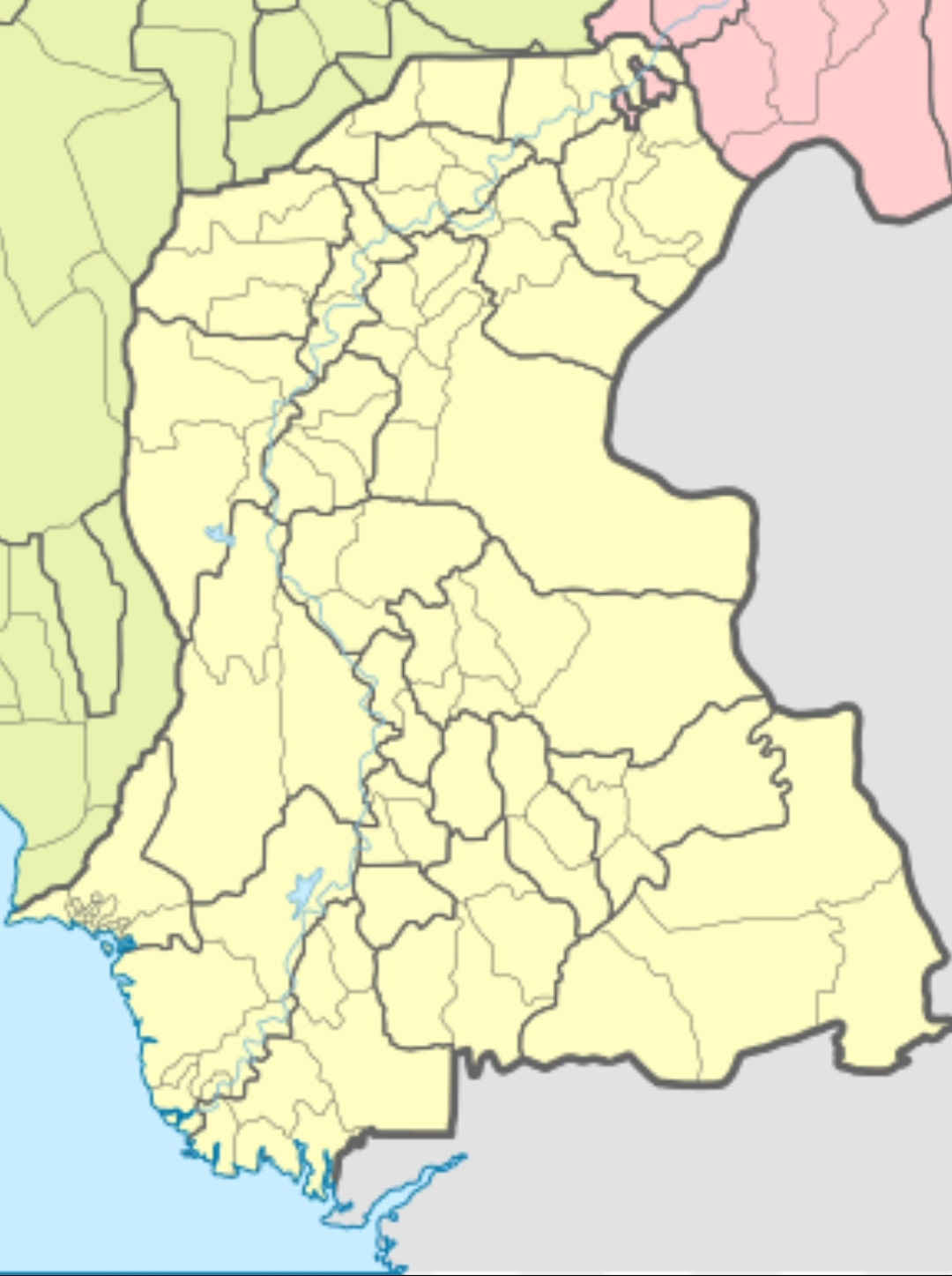
- Tehsils of Sindh, Outline by Districts
- Location: Sindh, Pakistan
- Number: 138 (as of 2023)
- Government: District Government; Taluka Committee
- Subdivisions: Union councils

In Pakistan, a tehsil is an administrative sub-division of a District, and each tehsil is further sub-divided into union councils. The province of Sindh comprises thirty districts, which together contain 138 tehsils. In Sindh, these administrative units are locally known as talukas, which are equivalent to tehsils used elsewhere in the country.

Here is a list of all the tehsils of Sindh Province.

== List of Tehsils ==
Tehsil	Area (km^{2})	Population (2023)	Density (ppl/km^{2}) (2023)	Literacy rate (2023)	Districts	Divisions
Badin Tehsil	1,816	490,386	270.04	37.7%	Badin District	Hyderabad Division
Matli Tehsil	1,143	471,100	412.16	39.32%	Badin District	Hyderabad Division
Shaheed Fazil Rahu Tehsil	1,642	374,854	228.29	33.50%	Badin District	Hyderabad Division
Talhar Tehsil	569	184,206	323.74	34.16%	Badin District	Hyderabad Division
Tando Bago Tehsil	1,688	426,535	252.69	36.17%	Badin District	Hyderabad Division
Jati Tehsil	3,489	214,710	61.54	23.13%	Sujawal District	Hyderabad Division
Kharo Chan Tehsil	778	11,403	14.66	6.98%	Sujawal District	Hyderabad Division
Mirpur Bathoro Tehsil	698	231,735	332	32.01%	Sujawal District	Hyderabad Division
Shah Bandar Tehsil	3,074	168,911	54.95	15.97%	Sujawal District	Hyderabad Division
Sujawal Tehsil	746	212,533	284.90	35.02%	Sujawal District	Hyderabad Division
Ghorabari Tehsil	1,018	198,920	195.40	19.89%	Thatta District	Hyderabad Division
Keti Bunder	771	63,217	81.99	12.86%	Thatta District	Hyderabad Division
Mirpur Sakro Tehsil	2,958	376,078	127.14	27.95%	Thatta District	Hyderabad Division
Thatta Tehsil	3,823	444,976	116.39	30.90%	Thatta District	Hyderabad Division
Dadu Tehsil	846	508,607	601.19	64.39%	Dadu District	Hyderabad Division
Johi Tehsil	3,509	333,179	94.95	30.25%	Dadu District	Hyderabad Division
Khairpur Nathan Shah Tehsil	2,583	379,975	147.11	43.42%	Dadu District	Hyderabad Division
Mehar Tehsil	928	520,559	560.95	43.05%	Dadu District	Hyderabad Division
Hyderabad City Tehsil	43	778,132	18,096.09	73.74%	Hyderabad District	Hyderabad Division
Hyderabad Tehsil	711	511,265	719.08	42.57%	Hyderabad District	Hyderabad Division
Latifabad Tehsil	204	800,983	3,926.39	74.04%	Hyderabad District	Hyderabad Division
Qasimabad Tehsil	35	342,160	9,776.00	71.32%	Hyderabad District	Hyderabad Division
Kotri Tehsil	1,051	472,003	244.10	57.50%	Jamshoro District	Hyderabad Division
Sehwan Tehsil	2,160	322,011	149.08	41.91%	Jamshoro District	Hyderabad Division
Manjhand Tehsil	2,303	161,794	70.28	35.19%	Jamshoro District	Hyderabad Division
Thana Bulla Khan Tehsil	5,690	161,500	28.39	55.19%	Jamshoro District	Hyderabad Division
Hala Tehsil	488	286,155	586.38	52.58%	Matiari District	Hyderabad Division
Matiari Tehsil	568	377,945	665.40	39.64%	Matiari District	Hyderabad Division
Saeedabad Tehsil	361	185,283	513.25	48.11%	Matiari District	Hyderabad Division
Chamber Tehsil	483	233,424	483.28	29.96%	Tando Allahyar District	Hyderabad Division
Jhando Mari Tehsil	626	266,665	425.98	36.68%	Tando Allahyar District	Hyderabad Division
Tando Allahyar Tehsil	445	421,923	948.14	46.83%	Tando Allahyar District	Hyderabad Division
Bulri Shah Karim Tehsil	770	247,027	320.81	27.15%	Tando Muhammad Khan District	Hyderabad Division
Tando Ghulam Hyder Tehsil	390	206,665	529.91	30.26%	Tando Muhammad Khan District	Hyderabad Division
Tando Muhammad Khan Tehsil	263	272,427	1,035.84	42.70%	Tando Muhammad Khan District	Hyderabad Division
Gulberg Town	14	613,724	43,837.43	89.92%	Karachi Central District	Karachi Division
Liaquatabad Town	6	547,706	91,284.33	83.69%	Karachi Central District	Karachi Division
New Karachi Town	18	1,165,742	64,763.44	79.82%	Karachi Central District	Karachi Division
North Nazimabad Town	23	922,413	40,104.91	83.01%	Karachi Central District	Karachi Division
Nazimabad	8	572,740	71,592.50	84.73%	Karachi Central District	Karachi Division
Jamshed Town	11	656,014	59,637.64	85.99%	Karachi East District	Karachi Division
Ferozabad	20	1,167,692	58,384.60	83.02%	Karachi East District	Karachi Division
Gulshan-e-Iqbal	29	979,502	33,775.93	89.18%	Karachi East District	Karachi Division
Gulzar-e-Hijri	79	1,118,534	14,158.66	64.74%	Karachi East District	Karachi Division
Lyari Town	6	949,878	158,313.00	68.40%	Karachi South District	Karachi Division
Saddar Town	35	159,363	4,553.23	88.56%	Karachi South District	Karachi Division
Aram Bagh	4	237,224	59,306.00	86.43%	Karachi South District	Karachi Division
Civil Line	73	480,480	6,581.92	84.75%	Karachi South District	Karachi Division
Garden	4	502,819	125,704.75	84.50%	Karachi South District	Karachi Division
Orangi Town	9	596,919	66,324.33	60.76%	Karachi West District	Karachi Division
Manghopir	342	1,081,753	3,163.02	63.03	Karachi West District	Karachi Division
Mominabad	19	1,000,708	52,668.84	76.07%	Karachi West District	Karachi Division
Korangi Town	59	1,363,992	23,118.51	70.93%	Korangi District	Karachi Division
Landhi Town	19	681,294	35,857.58	84.60%	Korangi District	Karachi Division
Shah Faisal Town	21	641,894	30,566.38	89.60%	Korangi District	Karachi Division
Model Colony	9	441,791	49,087.89	86.85%	Korangi District	Karachi Division
Bin Qasim	447	322,915	722.40	62.19%	Malir District	Karachi Division
Gadap Town	1,104	100,351	90.90	58.94%	Malir District	Karachi Division
Airport	41	254,370	6,204.15	86.74%	Malir District	Karachi Division
Ibrahim Hyderi	97	1,341,638	13,831.32	57.91%	Malir District	Karachi Division
Murad Memon Goth	195	376,987	1,933.27	71.88%	Malir District	Karachi Division
Shah Mureed	276	35,987	130.39	49.70%	Malir District	Karachi Division
Keamari Town	50	451,801	9,036.02	55.61%	Keamari District	Karachi Division
Baldia Town	34	948,597	27,899.91	64.25%	Keamari District	Karachi Division
S.I.T.E. Town	25	449,120	17,964.80	68.48%	Keamari District	Karachi Division
Maripur	450	218,933	486.52	52.76%	Keamari District	Karachi Division
Garhi Khairo Tehsil	733	193,297	263.72	45.58%	Jacobabad District	Larkana Division
Jacobabad Tehsil	664	447,647	674.11	45.47%	Jacobabad District	Larkana Division
Thul Tehsil	1,301	533,153	409.81	38.53%	Jacobabad District	Larkana Division
Kandhkot Tehsil	654	407,592	623.23	37.91%	Kashmore District	Larkana Division
Kashmore Tehsil	1,262	487,601	386.37	32.65%	Kashmore District	Larkana Division
Tangwani Tehsil	664	338,764	510.19	36.95%	Kashmore District	Larkana Division
Bakrani Tehsil	425	275,268	647.69	46.38%	Larkana District	Larkana Division
Dokri Tehsil	412	257,394	624.74	49.19%	Larkana District	Larkana Division
Larkana Tehsil	549	873,868	1,591.74	58.76%	Larkana District	Larkana Division
Ratodero Tehsil	562	377,923	672.46	58.93%	Larkana District	Larkana Division
Mirokhan Tehsil	374	182,461	487.92	33.41%	Qambar Shahdadkot District	Larkana Division
Nasirabad Tehsil	309	174,708	565.47	41.81%	Qambar Shahdadkot District	Larkana Division
Qambar Tehsil	2,260	448,990	198.67	39.36%	Qambar Shahdadkot District	Larkana Division
Qubo Saeed Khan Tehsil	1,033	99,308	96.13	26.46%	Qambar Shahdadkot District	Larkana Division
Shahdadkot Tehsil	419	225,086	537.53	47.06%	Qambar Shahdadkot District	Larkana Division
Sijawal Junejo Tehsil	385	130,635	339.31	37.66%	Qambar Shahdadkot District	Larkana Division
Warah Tehsil	695	253,681	365.01	44.25%	Qambar Shahdadkot District	Larkana Division
Garhi Yasin Tehsil	971	333,289	343.24	42.76%	Shikarpur District	Larkana Division
Khanpur Tehsil	629	331,219	526.58	29.41%	Shikarpur District	Larkana Division
Lakhi Tehsil	351	300,490	856.10	49.43%	Shikarpur District	Larkana Division
Shikarpur Tehsil	561	421,332	751.04	50.99%	Shikarpur District	Larkana Division
Daharki Tehsil	2,088	335,145	160.51	36.84%	Ghotki District	Sukkur Division
Ghotki Tehsil	763	540,939	708.96	45.96%	Ghotki District	Sukkur Division
Khan Garh Tehsil (Khanpur)	1,986	162,318	81.73	39.01%	Ghotki District	Sukkur Division
Mirpur Mathelo Tehsil	593	350,647	591.31	42.66%	Ghotki District	Sukkur Division
Ubauro Tehsil	653	383,560	587.38	38.39%	Ghotki District	Sukkur Division
Faiz Ganj Tehsil	946	243,254	257.14	46.43%	Khairpur District	Sukkur Division
Gambat Tehsil	582	286,129	491.63	52.89%	Khairpur District	Sukkur Division
Khairpur Tehsil	585	465,233	795.27	59.37%	Khairpur District	Sukkur Division
Kingri Tehsil	531	370,304	697.37	49.04%	Khairpur District	Sukkur Division
Kot Diji Tehsil	520	385,872	742.06	45.29%	Khairpur District	Sukkur Division
Nara Tehsil	11,611	173,968	14.98	34.47%	Khairpur District	Sukkur Division
Sobho Dero Tehsil	504	293,160	581.67	49.88%	Khairpur District	Sukkur Division
Thari Mirwah Tehsil	631	379,615	601.61	51.22%	Khairpur District	Sukkur Division
New Sukkur Tehsil	109	356,473	3,270.39	57.96%	Sukkur District	Sukkur Division
Pano Akil Tehsil	1,042	457,078	438.65	58.54%	Sukkur District	Sukkur Division
Rohri Tehsil	807	421,500	522.30	49.93%	Sukkur District	Sukkur Division
Salehpat Tehsil	2,957	137,738	46.58	34.50%	Sukkur District	Sukkur Division
Sukkur Tehsil	250	267,108	1,068.43	79.43%	Sukkur District	Sukkur Division
Bhiria Tehsil	488	330,308	676.86	58.14%	Naushahro Feroze District	Shaheed Benazirabad Division
Kandiaro Tehsil	771	356,506	462.39	64.04%	Naushahro Feroze District	Shaheed Benazirabad Division
Mehrabpur Tehsil	361	273,764	758.35	60.92%	Naushahro Feroze District	Shaheed Benazirabad Division
Moro Tehsil	609	408,148	670.19	53.87%	Naushahro Feroze District	Shaheed Benazirabad Division
Naushahro Feroze Tehsil	717	408,356	569.53	51.24%	Naushahro Feroze District	Shaheed Benazirabad Division
Kazi Ahmed Tehsil	972	402,834	414.44	47.11%	Shaheed Benazirabad District	Shaheed Benazirabad Division
Daur Tehsil (2004)	2,210	532,621	241.00	41.36%	Shaheed Benazirabad District	Shaheed Benazirabad Division
Nawabshah Tehsil (1907)	435	481,978	1,108.00	62.44%	Shaheed Benazirabad District	Shaheed Benazirabad Division
Sakrand Tehsil (1858)	885	427,669	483.24	52.84%	Shaheed Benazirabad District	Shaheed Benazirabad Division
Jam Nawaz Ali Tehsil	440	171,598	390.00	31.67%	Sanghar District	Shaheed Benazirabad Division
Khipro Tehsil	5,933	366,748	61.81	37.04%	Sanghar District	Shaheed Benazirabad Division
Sanghar Tehsil	2,118	482,560	227.84	40.00%	Sanghar District	Shaheed Benazirabad Division
Shahdadpur Tehsil	890	525,164	590.07	50.69%	Sanghar District	Shaheed Benazirabad Division
Sinjhoro Tehsil	907	354,709	391.08	42.02%	Sanghar District	Shaheed Benazirabad Division
Tando Adam Khan Tehsil	440	407,686	926.56	50.81%	Sanghar District	Shaheed Benazirabad Division
Digri Tehsil	572	234,578	410.10	46.10%	Mirpur Khas District	Mirpur Khas Division
Hussain Bux Mari Tehsil	209	172,143	823.70	33.26%	Mirpur Khas District	Mirpur Khas Division
Jhuddo Tehsil	363	230,285	634.39	38.59%	Mirpur Khas District	Mirpur Khas Division
Kot Ghulam Muhammad Tehsil	762	310,142	407.01	41.19%	Mirpur Khas District	Mirpur Khas Division
Mirpur Khas Tehsil	24	287,802	11,991.75	74.63%	Mirpur Khas District	Mirpur Khas Division
Shujabad Tehsil	396	185,654	468.82	39.46%	Mirpur Khas District	Mirpur Khas Division
Sindhri Tehsil	599	260,782	435.36	31.99%	Mirpur Khas District	Mirpur Khas Division
Chachro Tehsil	3,386	371,769	109.80	31.07%	Tharparkar District	Mirpur Khas Division
Dahli Tehsil	2,126	326,034	153.36	31.47%	Tharparkar District	Mirpur Khas Division
Diplo Tehsil	2,872	163,119	56.80	46.10%	Tharparkar District	Mirpur Khas Division
Kaloi Tehsil	922	129,677	140.65	37.91%	Tharparkar District	Mirpur Khas Division
Islamkot Tehsil	3,515	265,643	75.57	36.01%	Tharparkar District	Mirpur Khas Division
Mithi Tehsil	2,954	239,091	80.94	49.84%	Tharparkar District	Mirpur Khas Division
Nagarparkar Tehsil	3,862	283,074	73.30	29.49%	Tharparkar District	Mirpur Khas Division
Kunri Tehsil	585	237,063	405.24	38.72%	Umerkot District	Mirpur Khas Division
Pithoro Tehsil	855	130,383	152.49	39.90%	Umerkot District	Mirpur Khas Division
Samaro Tehsil	959	184,051	191.92	29.72%	Umerkot District	Mirpur Khas Division
Umerkot Tehsil	3,209	608,334	189.57	41.00%	Umerkot District	Mirpur Khas Division
