= Divisions of Sindh =

Second-level administrative regions of Pakistan

- Category: First-level administrative body
- Location: Pakistan
- Found in: Sindh
- Number: 6 (as of 2024)
- Populations: Greatest: Karachi —20,382,881 (2023 census); Least: Mirpur Khas —4,619,624 (2023 census)
- Areas: Largest: Hyderabad — 48,670 km^{2} (18,790 sq mi); Smallest: Karachi —3,528 km^{2} (1,362 sq mi)
- Government: Division Administration
- Subdivisions: Districts; Tehsils; Union councils

The divisions of Sindh (Note: Sindhi: سنڌ جا ڀاڱا; Urdu: تقسیمات سندھ) are the first-order administrative bodies of the Pakistani province of Sindh. In total, there are 6 divisions, which are further divided into districts depending upon area. Divisions are governed by Commissioners while districts are governed by Deputy Commissioners.

== History ==
Administrative divisions had formed an integral tier of government from colonial times. The Governor's provinces of British India were subdivided into divisions, which were themselves subdivided into districts.

On 1 April 1936 Sind division separated from Bombay Presidency and established a Province.

Most of the former Sind Province became Hyderabad Division. In 1955, the One Unit policy meant that there were only two provinces – East and West Pakistan. East Pakistan had the same divisions as East Bengal had previously, but West Pakistan gradually gained seven new divisions to add to the original six. The princely state of Khairpur and some parts of Hyderabad Division to form Khairpur Division. When West Pakistan was dissolved, the divisions were regrouped into four new provinces.

Gradually over the late 1970s, new divisions were formed. In 1975 the Khairpur Division was abolished and create Sukkur Division and Divisional Headquarters also shifted from khairpur to Sukkur. Larkana Division also created by bifurcation of Sukkur Division.

1990 Mirpurkhas Division were split from Hyderabad Division.

In August 2000, local government reforms abolished the "Division" as an administrative tier and introduced a system of local government councils, with the first elections held in 2001. Following that there was radical restructuring of the local government system to implement "the principle of subsidiarity, whereby all functions that can be effectively performed at the local level are transferred to that level". This meant devolution of many functions, to districts and tehsils, which were previously handled at the provincial and divisional levels. At abolition, there were five divisions in Sindh.

In 2008, after the public elections, the new government decided to restore the divisions of all provinces. In Sindh after the lapse of the Local Governments Bodies term in 2010 the Divisional Commissioners system was to be restored. In July 2011, the Govt. of Sindh decided to restore the commissioner system in the province. As a consequence, the five divisions of Sindh have been restored, namely, Karachi, Hyderabad, Sukkur, Mirpurkhas, and Larkana with their respective districts. In the year 2014, Sindh Government decided to create a new division in the province, the Shaheed Benazirabad division.

Karachi district was de-merged into its 5 original constituent districts, namely, Karachi East, Karachi West, Karachi Central, Karachi South, and Malir. Recently, Korangi District and Kemari District were carved out of the original 5 districts of Karachi. These seven districts form the Karachi Division now.

== Administration ==
Every division of Sindh is divided into many districts and then further into talukas and union councils. Each division is administered by a commissioner, assisted by different deputy commissioners of all districts of their division.

== List of the Divisions by area, population, density, literacy rate etc. ==
Name	Headquarter	Districts	Area (km^{2})	Population (2023)	Pop. Density (2023)	Literacy rate (2023)	Map
Hyderabad Division	Hyderabad	Dadu District; Hyderabad; Jamshoro District; Matiari District; Tando Allahyar District; Tando Muhammad Khan District; Badin District; Sujawal District; Thatta District	48,670	11,659,246	239.56/km^{2}	45.38%	
Karachi Division	Karachi	Central; East; South; West; Korangi; Malir; Kemari	3,527	20,382,881	5,779.10/km^{2}	75.11%	
Larkana Division	Larkana	Jacobabad District; Kashmore District; Larkana District; Qambar Shahdadkot District; Shikarpur District	15,213	7,093,706	466.29/km^{2}	44.53%	
Mirpur Khas Division	Mirpur Khas	Mirpur Khas District; Tharparkar District; Umerkot District	28,170	4,619,624	153.99/km^{2}	40.41%	
Shaheed Benazirabad Division	Nawabshah	Naushahro Feroze District; Shaheed Benazir Abad District; Sanghar District	18,176	5,930,649	326.29/km^{2}	49.91%	
Sukkur Division	Sukkur	Ghotki District; Khairpur District; Sukkur District	27,158	6,010,041	221.30/km^{2}	59.72%	

== List of the Divisions by Population & Density over the years ==
Name	Population (1998)	Pop. Density (1998)	Population (2017)	Pop. Density (2017)	Population (2023)	Pop. Density (2023)
Hyderabad Division	4,610,071	137.503/km^{2}	7,026,335	209.572/km^{2}	11,659,246	252.1/km^{2}
Karachi Division	9,856,318	2,793.741/km^{2}	16,051,521	4,549.751/km^{2}	20,382,881	5,536.3/km^{2}
Larkana Division	N/A	N/A	6,190,926	406.950/km^{2}	7,093,706	408.8/km^{2}
Mirpur Khas Division	2,585,417	91.776/km^{2}	4,228,683	150.108/km^{2}	4,619,624	164.3/km^{2}
Shaheed Benazirabad Division	3,510,036	193.124/km^{2}	5,282,277	290.634/km^{2}	5,930,649	331.5/km^{2}
Sukkur Division	3,447,935	140.703/km^{2}	5,538,555	226.017/km^{2}	6,010,041	232.5/km^{2}

== Former Division ==
- Khairpur Division

== See also ==
- Divisions of Pakistan
  - Divisions of Punjab, Pakistan
  - Divisions of Khyber Pakhtunkhwa
  - Divisions of Balochistan
  - Divisions of Azad Kashmir
  - Divisions of Gilgit-Baltistan
- Districts of Pakistan
  - Districts of Punjab, Pakistan
  - Districts of Sindh
  - Districts of Balochistan, Pakistan
  - Districts of Khyber Pakhtunkhwa
  - Districts of Azad Kashmir
  - Districts of Gilgit-Baltistan
- Tehsils of Pakistan
  - Tehsils of Punjab, Pakistan
  - Tehsils of Sindh
  - Tehsils of Balochistan
  - Tehsils of Khyber Pakhtunkhwa
  - Tehsils of Azad Kashmir
  - Tehsils of Gilgit-Baltistan
