= Mohammad Khan Majeedi =

Sindhi nationalist poet

Mohammad Khan Majeedi Sindhi: محمد خان مجيدي
- Born: Mohammad Khan; 5 January 1918 village Shadman Jatoi, Taluka Mirpur Bathoro
- Died: 7 April 2003 (aged 85); Sujawal, Sindh
- Education: Sindhi Final
- Occupation: Poet
- Writing career
- Literary movement: Sindhi nationalism

Mohammad Khan Majeedi (Sindhi: محمد خان مجيدي; 5 January 1918 at Shadman Jatoi village, in Taluka Mirpur Bathoro, Sujawal District – 7 April 2003 in Sujawal) was a nationalist poet in the Sindhi language.

== Education ==
His early education was at Jhok. He passed the Sindhi final with a first position from Sindh Madarsa, Karachi in 1932.

== Professional career ==
He was appointed as a Dhuk Munshi at Jhok, then as a primary school teacher in August 1934. Serving at various schools as a teacher, he retired from the post of Headmaster on 5 January 1976. During his service he attended many gatherings, educational programs and worked for the rights of teachers through the All Sindh Primary Teachers Association.

== Literary career ==
He started poetry during his time as a schoolteacher and headmaster. He was inspired from G. M. Syed, pioneer of Modern Sindhi nationalism. He wrote several pieces of poetry on Sindh land. After retirement Majeedi dedicated himself full-time to poetry. He would read his poetry on stage with melodious tune. His first book, Sindhri Ain Una Joon Qomoon (Sindhi: سنڌڙي ۽ ان جون قومون), a long poem of 96 stanzas about tribes and casts of Sindh, each stanza consisted of 8 lines, was published in 1992. Another book of poetry, Mitti Muhinji Mitti Aa (Sindhi: مٽي منهنجي مٽي آ), was published in 2000.

== Personal life ==
He has two daughters and a son. His second daughter, Maryam Majeedi, is also a poet.

== Recognition ==
His poetry has been sung by Zarina Baloch, Sarmad Sindhi and other artists. The Government of Sindh named a girls school after him in Mirpur Bithoro in recognition of his services and dedication towards the Sindh and its people.

== Death ==
He died on 7 April 2003 in Sujawal.
