= Shah Bandar =

Shah Bandar or Shahbandar may refer to:

- Shahbandar, official of the ports in Safavid Persia
- Shahbandar, Pakistan, a town in Thatta District, Sindh, Pakistan
- Shahabandar, village in Karnataka, India
- Shabandar, a village in Lorestan, Iran
- Shahbandar Tehsil, an administrative area, Pakistan
- Shabandar Café, a cultural location in Baghdad, Iraq
- Shabandar Mosque, an old mosque in Baghdad, Iraq
- Abd al-Rahman Shahbandar (1879–1940), Syrian politician
- Samira al-Shahbandar (born 1946), flight attendant and second wife of Saddam Hussein
- Musa al-Shabandar (1897–1967), Iraqi politician and diplomate
- Ibrahim al-Shabandar (born 1890–1957), Iraqi businessman, economist, and politician
- Iqbal Shahbandri or Iqbal Bhatkal (born 1970), leader of the Indian Mujahideen
- Riyaz Ismail Shahbandri or Riyaz Bhatkal (born 1978), leader of the Indian Mujahideen

== See also ==
- Bandar Shah, a city in Golestan, Iran
