= Sarwech Sujawali =

Sarwech Sujawali Sindhi: سرويچ سجاولي
- Born: 14 March 1937; Sujawal, Sindh, Pakistan
- Died: 22 October 2007 (aged 70); Sujawal, Sindh
- Occupations: Poet, administrator, farmer
- Writing career
- Pen name: "Mohammad Siddique"
- Genre: Aesthetic
- Subject: Poetry
- Notable work: Poetry
- Literary movement: Progressive

Sarwech Sujawali (Sindhi: سرويچ سجاولي) (original name: Mohammad Siddique), a revolutionary poet of Sindh was born on 14 March 1937 at the village Ibrahim Tararri, Sujawal District. He was active in politics and the subject matter of his poetry was Sindhi nationalism, for which he was sent to prison on many occasions by the government of Pakistan. He died on 22 October 2007.

== Education ==
He received his early education at his village. Besides that, he also worked with his father at an agricultural land.

== Professional career ==
Sarwech Sujawali was greatly impressed by the poetry of Molvi Ahmed Mallah and started his poetry writing in 1957. In 1958, he recited his poetry at a public gathering. Muhammad Yousif Junejo, a collector of that time was quite impressed with his poetry and when he came to know about Sujawali's hard job at working agricultural crops, he appointed him as a "Munshi" in the town committee of Sujawal, where he remained until 1972.

Earlier, during 1960, he was appointed as a teacher in Al Hashmia Madrasa Sujawal. From 1973 to 1977, he was Administrator in the town-committee of Sujawal. He also offered self-arrest in the Movement for the Restoration of Democracy.

== Literary career ==
While he was working as a government servant, he would write poetry. Sujawali's poetry is full of nationalistic themes and focuses entirely on the rural atmosphere by using simple and pure language. His poetry has been sung by several local singers on Pakistan Television Corporation, Karachi center, stages and cassettes including, Bhaqwanti Nawanni at All India Radio. He loved Sindh and Sindhi to a great extent.

== Publication ==
“Aalyoon Akhyoun, Anbha Waar” (Sindhi: آليون اکيون، اڻڀا وار) (English: Wet Eyes and Dry Hair) is his best poetic collection. The book was published in 1972 and the Writers' Guild awarded him one thousand rupees’ for his marvelous achievement. The University of Karachi has included the achievement in its Sindhi master's curriculum syllabus.

His poetry is the manifestation of Sindhi society, especially concerning the daily lives of Sindhi women.

== Death ==
He died on 22 October 2007 and is buried in his native town Sujawal District, Sindh.
