= Kot Aalam =

Village in Sindh, Pakistan

Coordinates: 24°50′19.57″N 68°8′16.27″E

Kot Aalam, (also spelt as Kot Almo, Kot Alam, Kot Alam Kalan, or Kot Aalmoon) is a small village and a deh of union council Bijora in Sujawal District of Sindh province of Pakistan. The village is situated on the left bank of the Indus River around 7 kilometres (4.3 mi) away from Daro city.

== History ==
During British era in 1922, it was registered for nominal customs duties. In 1988, a development grant was awarded the village by the Sindh government. After the 2010 Pakistan floods, which devastated the village, many Memon families have migrated to other cities of Sindh, specially Karachi, Daro, Mirpur Bathoro, Thatta and Tandojam. As of 2023, it is virtually a ghost town.

This village has an ancient history. It was an Islamic center, a town of Thatta. Its inhabitants were Muslims, including some scholars who used to work as farmers for survival. It was damaged three times due to river floods and time to time its position was moved from one place to another. The most recent flood destroyed the village completely during 2010.

== Agriculture ==
It is an agricultural area close to Pinnah forest on the left bank of Rajwah tributary supplied by Penjary canal of Ghulam Muhammad (Kotri) barrage, Hyderabad Sindh. A Surjani Loop (SL) Bacha Band separated irrigated and flood areas.

== Inhabitants ==
The inhabitants consist of Sayyed, Memon, Mirbhar, Solangi and Khaskheli families including adjacent villages. The village has been destroyed nine times in floods. The inhabitants had stayed here time to time, the inhabitants are poor mostly farmers and labourers. Rice, wheat and sugarcane are the main crops during both cropping seasons (Kharif and Rabi). An acute shortage of irrigation water throughout the year annually produce poor yields per unit area.
