= Daro, Sindh =

Pakistani town

Coordinates: 24°47′45″N 68°10′49″E

Daro or Darro is a small town in the Sujawal District of Sindh, Pakistan.

It is a union administration of tehsil Mirpur Bathoro, a small thickly-populated town situated on the left bank of Pinjari Canal of Ghulam Muhammad (Kotri Barrage) about 10 km to the east of Mirpur Bathoro, Sujawal District, Sindh, Pakistan. Daro is surrounded by agricultural land. The town experiences a hot and humid climate, typical of the region, making it suitable for the cultivation of various crops.

Daro's education system consists of two primary schools. Additionally, it has two segregated higher secondary schools, namely Government Boys Higher Secondary School Daro and Government Girls Higher Secondary School Daro.

== History and etymology ==
Daro's story goes way back to the early 1900s when it was first established. Since then, it has grown into a lively town. The name "Daro" is thought to come from the Sindhi word for "marketplace", which means it might have been an important trading place from the beginning. Throughout the years, Daro became a big commercial center in the area. By the mid-1900s, it became even more famous as a major trading hub, attracting traders and merchants from nearby places.

== Economy and agriculture ==
Daro's economy is mainly based on farming, and most people there make a living from agriculture. The rich and fertile lands around the town are perfect for growing crops like rice, wheat, and sugarcane. These crops are essential for the local economy and help many farmers and agricultural workers support themselves. Besides farming, Daro also has a few small industries, including a brick kiln and a rice mill.

== Population and culture ==
More than 10,000 people live in Daro, and they come from different ethnic backgrounds. Most of the people are Sindhi, but there are also many Pathan, Balochi and other communities.

== Education and institutions ==
Daro is equipped with well-established schools, a middle school, and a high school, providing students with access to quality education. Furthermore, the government has recently approved the establishment of a Mehran University of Engineering & Technology campus in the Sujawal District. This new campus will offer practical engineering education.

== Festivals and celebrations ==
Some of these important celebrations are:

- Independence Day and Pakistan Day.
- Eid Festivals: There are four big Eid festivals - Eid al-Fitr, Eid al-Adha, Shab e Barat, and Shab-e-Qadr.
- 12 Rabi Ul Awal: This festival is to celebrate the birthday of the Islamic prophet Muhammad.
- 10 Muharram: This is a day of mourning and reflection.
