= PS-74 Sujawal-II =

Constituency of the Provincial Assembly of Sindh, Pakistan

- Constituency for the Provincial Assembly of Sindh
- Region: Jati Taluka, Sujawal Tehsil (partly), Shahbandar Tehsil, and Kharo Chan Tehsil of Sujawal District

Current constituency
- Party: PPP
- Member: Muhammad Ali Malkani
- Created from: PS-87 Thatta-IV (2002-2018); PS-76 Sujawal-II (2018-2023)

PS-74 Sujawal-II (پی ایس-74، سجاول-2) is a constituency of the Provincial Assembly of Sindh.

== General elections 2024 ==
Provincial election 2024: PS-74 Sujawal-II
Party	Candidate	Votes	%	±%
PPP	Muhammad Ali Malkani	83,900	79.01	
Independent	Abdul Sattar	14,259	13.43	
JUI (F)	Najeebullah	3,146	2.96	
Others	Others (nine candidates)	4,891	4.60	
Turnout		110,779	53.32	
Total valid votes		106,196	95.86	
Rejected ballots		4,603	4.14	
Majority		69,641	65.58	
Registered electors		207,784		
PPP hold				

== General elections 2018 ==
Provincial election 2018: PS-76 Sujawal-II
Party	Candidate	Votes	%	±%
PPP	Muhammad Ali Malkani	49,980	67.73	
TLP	Ghulam Muhammad Naeemi	17,832	24.17	
Independent	Naseer Ahmd Mirbaher	1,796	2.43	
MMA	Khadija	1,529	2.07	
PTI	Shoaib Ahmed Memon	678	0.92	
Independent	Shoukat Ali Malkani	500	0.68	
Independent	Muhammad Ashraf Thaheem	365	0.49	
GDA	Abdul Haque	363	0.49	
Independent	Wilayat Hussain Lohar	320	0.43	
Independent	Ghulam Sarwar Khatti	240	0.33	
Independent	Muhammad Ismail	186	0.25	
Majority		32,148	43.56	
Valid ballots		73,789		
Rejected ballots		4,502		
Turnout		78,291		
Registered electors		160,428		
hold				

== General elections 2013 ==
Contesting candidates	Party affiliation	Votes polled

== General elections 2008 ==
Contesting candidates	Party affiliation	Votes polled

== See also ==
- PS-73 Sujawal-I
- PS-75 Thatta-I
