= Juni Bek =

Former ruler of Thatta

Juni Bek was the last independent ruler of Thatta in Sind. Starting in 1586 the forces of Akbar waged war against Juni Bek's independent realm. After several years of resistance in 1593 he was made an official within the Mughal Empire and Thatta was made a province in the empire.
