= Local government in Pakistan =

Pakistan is a federal republic with three tiers of government: national, provincial and local. Local government is protected by the Constitution in Articles 32 and 140-A, and each province also has its own local-government-enabling legislation and ministries responsible for implementation. District councils and metropolitan corporations are respectively the highest rural and urban tiers of local government in the provinces. Both urban and rural local government have two or three tiers in all provinces except Khyber Pakhtunkhwa, where councils are not identified as either urban or rural. There are 129 district councils across the four provinces, 619 urban councils made up of one city district, four metropolitan corporations, 13 municipal corporations, 96 municipal committees, 148 town councils, 360 urban union committees, and 1,925 rural councils. Additionally there are 3339 neighbourhood, ‘tehsil’ and village councils in Khyber Pakhtunkhwa.

== Legislation ==
In response to the failure of central/provincial governments to account for local preferences, the National Reconstruction Bureau (NRB) designed a local government system which was presented in the blueprint "Devolution Plan 2000". Consequently, a new local government system was implemented on August 14, 2001, after each of the four provinces passed the Local Government Ordinance, 2001.

=== Levels ===
Country (e.g. Pakistan)
Province (e.g. Punjab)
Division (e.g. Rawalpindi Division)
District (e.g. Jhelum District)
Tehsil (e.g. Pind Dadan Khan)
Union Council (e.g. Khewra)

==== Provinces ====
The country is composed of four provinces and one federal territory: the provinces of Balochistan, Khyber Pakhtunkhwa, Punjab, Sindh, and the federally-administered Islamabad Capital Territory. Additionally, Pakistan also administers two autonomous territories (Note: Proclaimed as autonomous by the Government of Pakistan.) in the disputed region of Kashmir: Azad Jammu and Kashmir and Gilgit-Baltistan. (Note: In November 2020, Pakistani Prime Minister Imran Khan announced that Gilgit-Baltistan would attain 'provisional provincial status' after the 2020 assembly election, being a long-standing demand of the people of Gilgit-Baltistan.) Due to the ongoing Kashmir dispute with neighbouring India, it also claims sovereignty over the union territories of Jammu and Kashmir and Ladakh, but has not exercised administrative authority over either region since its independence and subsequent war with India in 1947–1948.

==== Divisions ====
The five provinces, capital territory of Pakistan are subdivided into 37 administrative "divisions". These divisions were abolished in 2000, but restored in 2008. The divisions do not include the Islamabad Capital Territory or the defunct Federally Administered Tribal Areas, which were counted at the same level as provinces, but in 2018 the Federally Administered Tribal Areas were subsumed into Khyber-Paktunkhwa Province and allocated to neighbouring divisions therein.

==== District ====
A district (Urdu: ضلع, zillah) is the first tier of local government. In total there are 149 districts in Pakistan, of which several are city districts. A District Government or a City District Government and Zillah Council form the governing body, with the District Coordination Officer serving as the administrative head. The District Governor or Zila Nazim used to be the executive head of districts until 2010, when the government shifted power to the District Coordination Officers. Their role is similar to district governors, with responsibility for implementing government strategy and developing initiatives arising out of it.

==== Tehsil ====
The Tehsil government is its second of the three tiers of local government. It is where the functions, responsibilities and authorities of districts government are devolved to more smaller units, these units are known as "Tehsil". The Tehsils are used in all over the Pakistan except Sindh province where the word "Taluka" is used instead, although the functions and authorities are the same. The head of the Tehsil government is "Tehsil Nazim" who is assisted by the tehsil Naib-Nazim. Every tehsil has a Tehsil Municipal Administration, consisting of a Tehsil council, Tehsil Nazim, tehsil/taluka municipal officer(TMO), Chief officer and other officials of local council.

==== Union Council ====
A Union Council is the basic tier of local government in Pakistan. Each Union Council consists of a certain number of members, including a Union Administrator and a Vice Union Administrator, who are elected through direct elections based on adult franchise and on the basis of joint electorate. The Union Administrator serves as the head of the Union Council and is responsible for overseeing the administration of the council.

The election process for Union Council members is organized and conducted by the Chief Election Commissioner. The elections are held on a non-party basis, and candidates are required to be residents of the union council area. The elections are typically held every four years, although the exact term may vary depending on the province.

In addition to the general seats, there are reserved seats for women in the Zila Council, which are proportionately divided among Tehsils or Towns. The election to these reserved seats is held separately, and all members of the Union Councils in a Tehsil or Town are eligible to vote.

The Union Council has a range of powers and functions, including:

- Providing basic services such as water, sanitation, and roads
- Maintaining law and order
- Promoting economic development and social welfare
- Collecting taxes and fees
- Approving budgets and development plans

Each Union Council has a secretariat, which is headed by a Secretary. The Secretary is responsible for the day-to-day administration of the council and for implementing the decisions of the council. The Union Council also has a number of committees, which are responsible for specific areas such as finance, development, and social welfare.

The Union Council is the lowest tier of local government in Pakistan, and it works closely with the Tehsil and District governments to deliver services and implement development plans. The Union Council also receives funding and support from the provincial and federal governments.

== See also ==
- Divisions of Pakistan
  - Divisions of Balochistan
  - Divisions of Khyber Pakhtunkhwa
  - Divisions of Punjab, Pakistan
  - Divisions of Sindh
  - Divisions of Azad Kashmir
  - Divisions of Gilgit-Baltistan
- Tehsils of Pakistan
  - Tehsils of Punjab, Pakistan
  - Tehsils of Khyber Pakhtunkhwa
  - Tehsils of Balochistan, Pakistan
  - Tehsils of Sindh, Pakistan
  - Tehsils of Azad Kashmir
  - Tehsils of Gilgit-Baltistan
- Districts of Pakistan
  - Districts of Khyber Pakhtunkhwa
  - Districts of Punjab, Pakistan
  - Districts of Balochistan, Pakistan
  - Districts of Sindh, Pakistan
  - Districts of Azad Kashmir
  - Districts of Gilgit-Baltistan
- List of cities in Pakistan by population
