= Deputy commissioner (Pakistan) =

Government position

Deputy commissioner (popularly abbreviated as "DC") is a chief administrative, land revenue officer/collector and representative of government in district or an administrative sub-unit of a division in Pakistan. The office-holder belongs to the commission of Pakistan Administrative Service erstwhile DMG/CSP or the Provincial Management Service erstwhile Provincial Civil Service.

The deputy commissioner is assisted by additional deputy commissioners (general, revenue, finance, and planning) and assistant commissioners and district monitoring officer, deputy director development and General assistant revenue.

Divisional commissioner is assisted by additional commissioners (revenue, consolidation, coordination) and assistant commissioners (general, revenue) and director development.

In absence or transfer of the commissioner, deputy commissioner of division headquarter holds the acting charge, normally.

== List of the serving Deputy Commissioners ==
As of 27 June 2025, following are the names of serving DCs in Pakistan:

=== Islamabad Capital Territory ===
| Deputy Commissioner ICT | Incumbent name | Predecessor |
|---|---|---|
| Islamabad | Irfan Nawaz Memon | |

=== Punjab Province ===
| District | Incumbent DC | Posting date | Posted from (District) |
|---|---|---|---|
| Attock | Rao Atif Raza | 5 February 2023 | None |
| Bahawalnagar | Muhammad Abbas | 27 March 2023 | Bhakkar |
| Bahawalpur | Syed Hassan Raza | 4 December 2025 | Narowal |
| Bhakkar | Ihsan Ali Jamali | 2 December 2025 | None |
| Chakwal | Ms. Sarah Hayat | 8 April 2025 | None |
| Chiniot | Ayesha Rizwan | 2 December 2025 | None |
| Dera Ghazi Khan | Muhammad Usman Khalid | 2 October 2024 | |
| Faisalabad | Capt Nadeem Nasir | August 2024 | Sargodha, Chiniot |
| Gujranwala | Naveed Ahmad | 2 October 2024 | None |
| Gujrat | Noor ul Ain Qureshi | 18 July 2025 | None |
| Hafizabad | Abdul Razzaq | 20 August 2024 | None |
| Jhang | Ali Akbar Bhinder | October 2024 | Bhakkar |
| Jhelum | Mir Reza Ozgen | September 2025 | Nowshera |
| Kasur | Asif Raza | 4 December 2025 | Chiniot, Hafizabad |
| Khanewal | Maleeha Rashid | 2 December 2025 | None |
| Khushab | Jahanzaib Labar | | |
| Kot Addu (Dysfunctional District) | Bilal Saleem | 5 December 2025 | None |
| Lahore | Syed Musa Raza | August 2024 | Bhakkar, Muzaffargarh, Rahim Yar Khan |
| Layyah | Asif Ali | 2 December 2025 | None |
| Lodhran | | December 2024 | None |
| Mandi Bahauddin | Faisal Saleem | August 2024 | None |
| Mianwali | Muhammad Asad Abbas Magsi | August 2025 | None |
| Murree | Zaheer Abbas Sherazi | September 2023 | Khanewal, Lodhran, Muzaffargarh |
| Multan | Noman Siddique | 4 December 2025 | None |
| Muzaffargarh | Usman Tahir | 18 July 2025 | None |
| Narowal | Tayyab Raza | 4 December 2025 | None |
| Nankana Sahib | Tasleem Akhar Rao | August 2024 | None |
| Okara | Ahmed Usman Javaid | October 2024 | None |
| Pakpattan | Asif Raza | 18 July 2025 | None |
| Rahim Yar Khan | Zaheer Anwar Jappa | October 2025 | Bahawalpur |
| Rajanpur | Shafqatullah Mushtaq | August 2024 | Bahawalnagar |
| Rawalpindi | Dr Hassan Waqar Cheema | February 2023 | Attock |
| Sahiwal | Capt Sami | | Muzaffargarh, Jehlum |
| Sargodha | Capt Muhammad Waseem | August 2024 | Bahawalnagar |
| Sheikhupura | Shahid Imran Marth | August 2024 | Mandi Bahauddin |
| Sialkot | Saba Asghar Ali | April 2025 | Narowal |
| Talagang (Dysfunctional District) | Ayyan Shahid | | |
| Taunsa (Dysfunctional District) | | | |
| Toba Tek Singh | Umar Abbas Mela | October 2025 | None |
| Vehari | Khalid Javed Goraya | 2 December 2025 | Mianwali |
| Wazirabad (Dysfunctional District) | | | |

=== Balochistan Province ===
| # | District | Incumbent DC | Predecessor |
|---|---|---|---|
| 1 | Mastung | Sobhan Saleem | |
| 2 | Kalat | Munir Ahmed Durrani | |
| 3 | Surab | Sahibzada Najeebullah | |
| 4 | Khuzdar | Younas | |
| 5 | Awaran | Aqeel Baloch | |
| 6 | Hub | Ismail Ibrahim | |
| 7 | Barkhan | Saeed ur Rehman | |
| 8 | Chagai | Jehanzeb Baloxh | |
| 9 | Chaman | Habib Ahmed Bangulzai | |
| 10 | Dera Bugti | Muhammad Riaz Khan | |
| 11 | Duki | Muhammad Naeem Khan | |
| 12 | Gwadar | Naqeebullah Kakar | |
| 13 | Harnai | Hazrat wali kakar | |
| 14 | Hub | Ismail Ibrahim | |
| 15 | Jafarabad | Khalid Khan | |
| 16 | Jhal Magsi | | |
| 17 | Kachhi | | |
| 18 | Kech | Major R Bashir Ahmed | |
| 19 | Kharan | Munir Soomro | |
| 20 | Kohlu | | |
| 21 | Lasbela | Humera Baloch | |
| 22 | Loralai | Haseeb Shuja | |
| 23 | Musakhel | | |
| 24 | Nasirabad | Zulfiqar Ali | |
| 25 | Nushki | Muhammad Hussain | |
| 26 | Panjgur | Jehanzeb Baloch | |
| 27 | Pishin | Qazi Mansoor Ahmed (PAS) | |
| 28 | Quetta | Meharullah Badini (PAS) | |
| 29 | Qila Abdullah | Munawar Hussain | |
| 30 | Qilla Saifullah | Sagar Kumar | |
| 31 | Sherani | HazratvWali | |
| 32 | Sibi | Major R Ilyas Kibzai | |
| 33 | Sohbatpur | Fareeda Tareen | |
| 34 | Washuk | Majeed | |
| 35 | Zhob | Arif Zarkoon | |
| 36 | Ziarat | Abdul Qadoos Achakzai | |
| 37 | Barshore | Khalid Shams | |

=== Khyber Pakhtunkhwa Province ===
| # | District | Incumbent DC | Predecessor |
|---|---|---|---|
| 1 | Abbottabad | Nadeem Nasir | Khalid Iqbal |
| 2 | Allai | | |
| 3 | Bajaur | Muhammad Anwar-ul-Haq | Fayyaz Khan |
| 4 | Bannu | Mohammad Khan Bangash | |
| 5 | Battagram | | |
| 6 | Buner | Hamid Ali | |
| 7 | Charsadda | Saad Hussain | |
| 8 | Central Dir District | | |
| 9 | Dera Ismail Khan | Nasrullah Khan | |
| 10 | Hangu | Irfan Ullah | |
| 11 | Haripur | | |
| 12 | Karak | Sharukh Ali Khan | |
| 13 | Khyber | Capt(R) Sanaullah Khan | |
| 14 | Kohat | Roshan Mehsud | |
| 15 | Kolai Palas | Fazal Hussain | |
| 16 | Kurram | | |
| 17 | Lakki Marwat | Iqbal Hussain | |
| 18 | Lower Chitral | Muhammad Ali Khan | |
| 19 | Lower Dir | Muhammad Fawad | |
| 20 | Lower Kohistan | | |
| 21 | Malakand | Shahid Khan Mohmand | |
| 22 | Mansehra | Bilal Shahid Rao | |
| 23 | Mardan | Habibullah Arif | |
| 24 | Mohmand | Mr. Arifullah Awan | |
| 25 | North Waziristan | Manzoor Ahmed Afridi | |
| 26 | Nowshera | | |
| 27 | Orakzai | Mr Muhammad Khalid | |
| 28 | Peshawar | | |
| 29 | Shangla | | |
| 30 | Upper South Waziristan | Mr. Ashfaq Khan | |
| 31 | Lower South Waziristan | Mohammad Nasir Khan | |
| 32 | Swabi | Gohar Ali Khan | |
| 33 | Swat | | |
| 34 | Tank | | |
| 35 | Torghar | Zia-ur-Rehman Marwat | |
| 36 | Upper Chitral | Mr. Muhammad Irfan Uddin | |
| 37 | Upper Dir | Gohar Zaman Wazir | |
| 38 | Upper Kohistan | | |

=== Sindh Province ===
| # | District | Incumbent DC | Posted from |
|---|---|---|---|
| 1 | Badin | | |
| 2 | Dadu | Syed Murtaza Ali Shah | |
| 3 | Ghotki | Dr. Syed Muhammad Ali | |
| 4 | Hyderabad | Bilal Memon | |
| 5 | Jacobabad | | |
| 6 | Jamshoro | | |
| 7 | Karachi Central | Taha Saleem | |
| 8 | Karachi East | Altaf Sheikh | |
| 9 | Karachi South | Altaf Hussain Sario | |
| 10 | Karachi West | Ahmed Ali Siddiqui | |
| 11 | Kashmore | | |
| 12 | Keamari | Mukhtiar Ali Abro | |
| 13 | Khairpur | Syed Ahmed Fawad Shah | |
| 14 | Korangi | Saleemullah Odho | |
| 15 | Larkana | Tariq Manzor chandio (since 2019) | |
| 16 | Malir | Saeed Leghari | |
| 17 | Matiari | | |
| 18 | Mirpur Khas | Zain Ul Abideen Memon | |
| 19 | Naushahro Feroze | Muhammad Arslan Saleem | |
| 20 | Qambar Shahdadkot | Sajjad Haider Qadri | |
| 21 | Sanghar | | |
| 22 | Shaheed Benazirabad | Kanwal Nizam Shaikh | |
| 23 | Shikarpur | | |
| 24 | Sujawal | | |
| 25 | Sukkur | | |
| 26 | Tando Allahyar | | |
| 27 | Tando Muhammad Khan | Dharmoon Bhawani | |
| 28 | Tharparkar | Muhammad Nawaz Sohoo | |
| 29 | Thatta | | |
| 30 | Umerkot | | |

== List of serving Commissioners in divisions ==
=== Islamabad, ICT, federal capital ===
| Chief commissioner ICT | Incumbent Commissioner | Predecessor |
|---|---|---|
| Islamabad | Lt (r) Sohail Ashraf | Muhammad Ali Randhawa |

=== Punjab Province ===
| # | Division | Incumbent | Posted from |
|---|---|---|---|
| 1 | Bahawalpur | Musarrat Jabeen | |
| 2 | Dera Ghazi Khan | Ishfaq Ahmed | |
| 3 | Faisalabad | Raja Jahangir Anwar | Bahawalpur |
| 4 | Gujranwala | Naveed Shirazi | |
| 5 | Gujrat | Naveed Shirazi | |
| 6 | Lahore | Maryam Khan Faislabad, Multan | |
| 7 | Multan | Aamir Karim Khan | |
| 8 | Rawalpindi | Aamer Khattak | Multan |
| 9 | Sahiwal | Asif Tufail | |
| 10 | Sargodha | Jahanzeb Awan | |

=== Balochistan Province ===
| # | Division | Incumbent | Posted from |
|---|---|---|---|
| 1 | Kalat | Muhammad Naeem Bazai | |
| 2 | Loralai | Saadat Hassan | |
| 3 | Makran | Dawood Khan Khilji | |
| 4 | Naseerabad | Moin ur Rahman | |
| 5 | Quetta | Mohammad Hamza Shafqaat | |
| 6 | Rakhshan | Mujeeb Ur Rehman Qambrani | |
| 7 | Sibi | Zahid Shah | |
| 8 | Zhob | Zeeshan Javed | |

=== Khyber Pakhtunkhwa Province ===
| # | Division | Incumbent | Posted from |
|---|---|---|---|
| 1 | Bannu | Parwaiz Sabatkhel | |
| 2 | Dera Ismail Khan | Amir Latif | |
| 3 | Hazara | Aamir Sultan Tareen | |
| 4 | Kohat | | |
| 5 | Malakand | Abid Khan Wazir | |
| 6 | Mardan | | |
| 7 | Peshawar | Riaz Khan Mehsud | |

=== Sindh Province ===
| # | Division | Incumbent | Posted from |
|---|---|---|---|
| 1 | Hyderabad | Bilal Memon | |
| 2 | Karachi | Syed Hassan Naqvi | |
| 3 | Larkana | Ghulam Mustafa Phull | |
| 4 | Mirpur Khas | Faisal Ahmed Uqaili | |
| 5 | Shaheed Benazirabad | Syed Muhammad Sajjad Hyder | |
| 6 | Sukkur | Fayaz Hussain Abbasi | |

== History ==
=== Post devolution Local Government Reforms (2001 to 2008) ===
During the presidency of Pervaz Musharraf, the office of deputy commissioner was replaced with district coordination officer, except in Islamabad. Also, the office of divisional commissioner was abolished. After his presidency, provincial governments of Pakistan again established this office through constitutional amendments.

However the office of deputy commissioner is deprived of its previous powers of as a district magistrate. Subsequently, additional deputy commissioners and assistant commissioners does not execute the role of additional district magistrate and sub-divisional magistrate, respectively. Magisterial powers are now executed by judicial officers and judges.

=== Post-independence of Pakistan ===
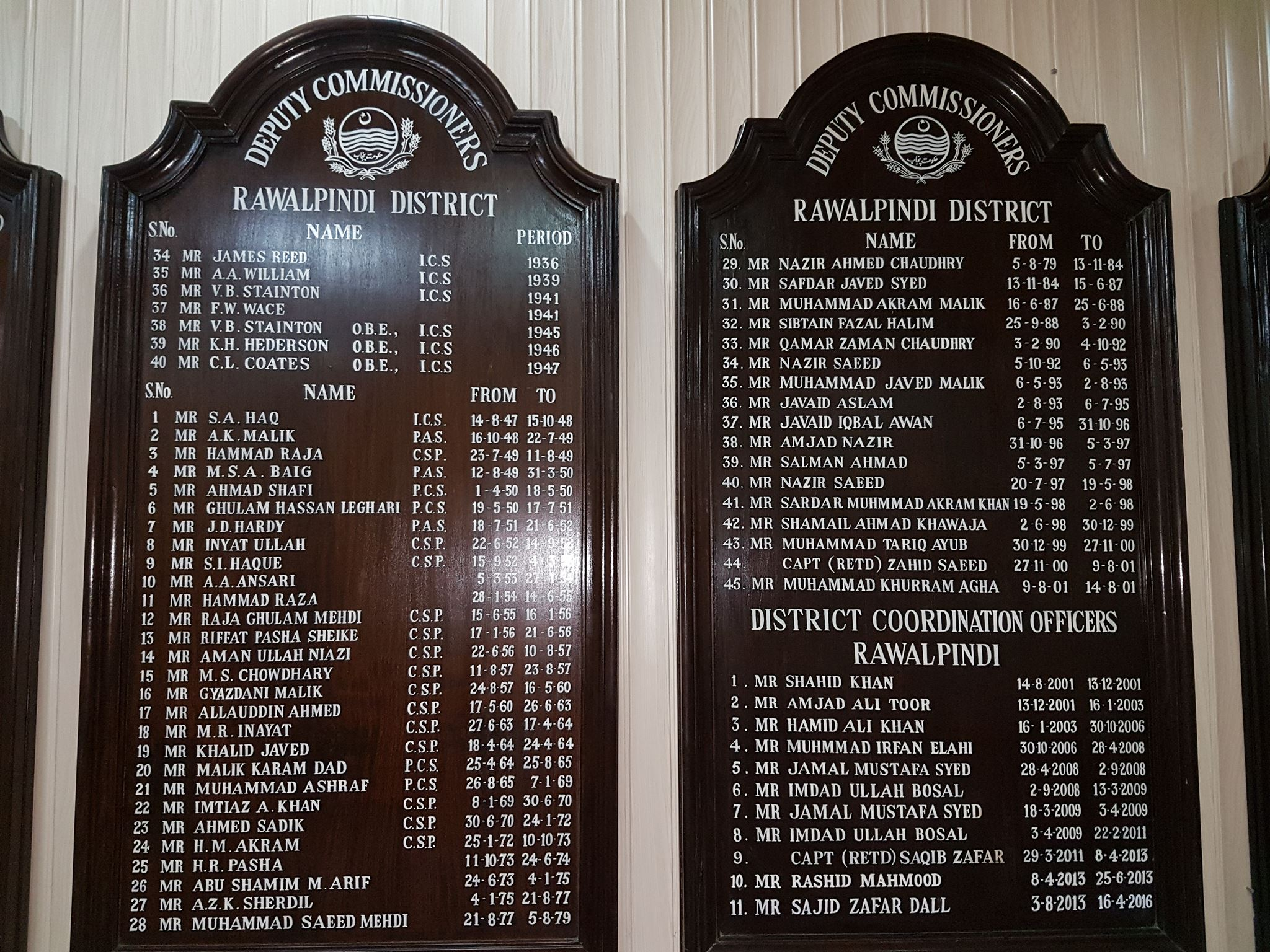
Deputy commissioners/district magistrates of Rawalpindi District

The district continued to be the unit of administration after Indian partition and independence of Pakistan in 1947. Initially, the role of the district collector remained largely unchanged, except for the separation of most judicial powers to judicial officers of the district.

=== Pre-independence ===
District administration in Pakistan is a legacy of the British Raj. District collectors were members of the British Indian Civil Service and were charged with supervising general administration in the district.

Warren Hastings introduced the office of the district collector in 1772. Sir George Campbell, lieutenant-governor of Bengal from 1871 to 1874, intended "to render the heads of districts no longer the drudges of many departments and masters of none, but in fact the general controlling authority over all departments in each district."

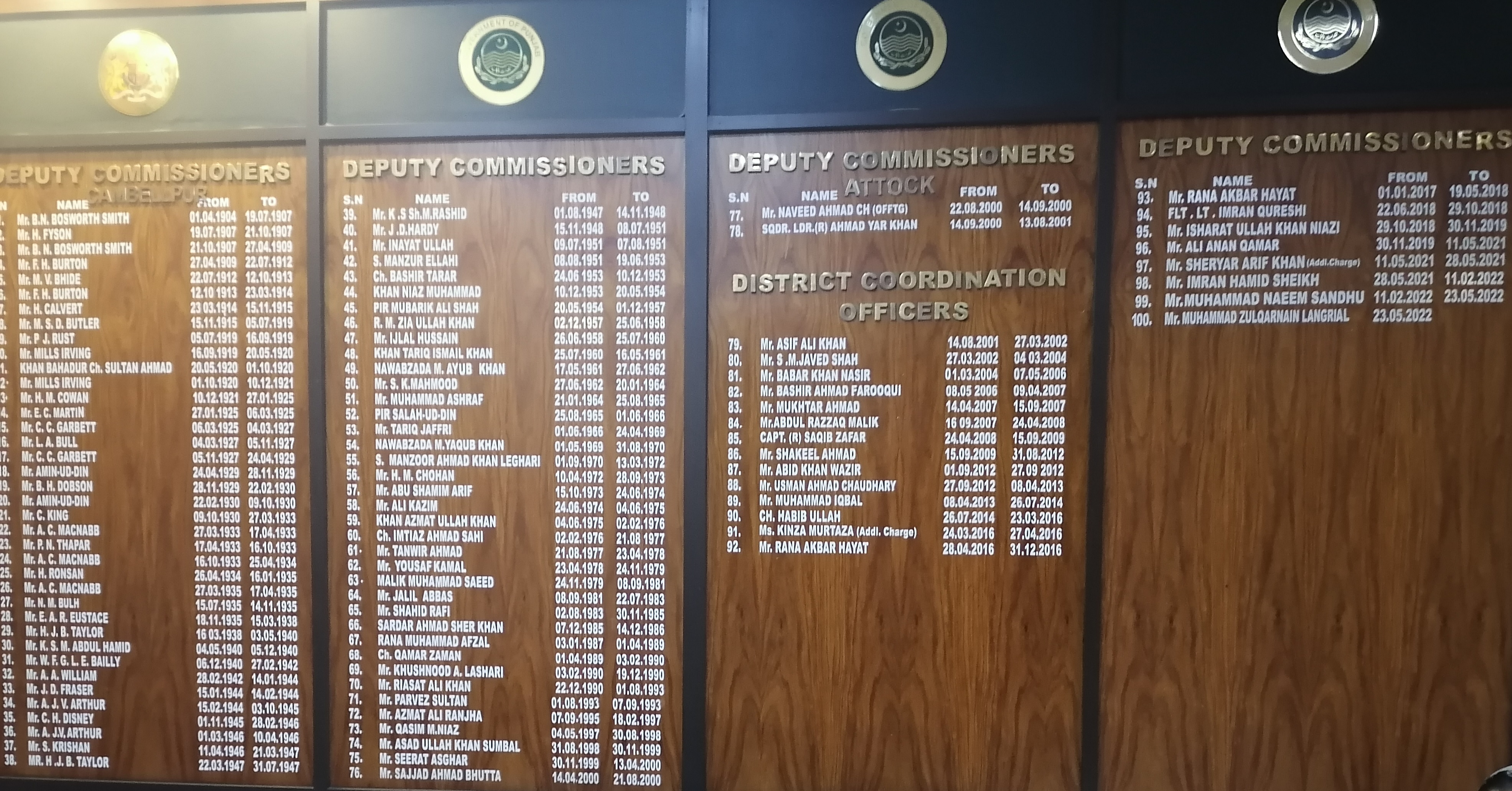
Deputy Commissioners of Attock (erstwhile Campbellpur) district, Punjab, Pakistan

The office of a collector/DC during the British rule in Indian subcontinent held multiple responsibilities – as collector, he was the head of the revenue organization, charged with registration, alteration, and partition of holdings; the settlement of disputes; the management of indebted estates; loans to agriculturists, and famine relief. As district magistrate, he exercised general supervision over the inferior courts and in particular, directed the police work. The office was meant to achieve the "peculiar purpose" of collecting revenue and of keeping the peace. The superintendent of police (SP), inspector general of jails, the surgeon general, the divisional forest officer (DFO) and the chief engineer (CE) had to inform the collector of every activity in their departments.

Until the latter part of the nineteenth century, no native was eligible to become a district collector, but with the introduction of open competitive examinations for the British Indian Civil Service, the office was opened to natives. Anandaram Baruah, an eminent scholar of Sanskrit and the sixth Indian and the first Assamese ICS officer, became the third Indian to be appointed a district magistrate, the first two being Romesh Chandra Dutt and Sripad Babaji Thakur respectively.

== Responsibilities ==
The responsibilities of deputy commissioner vary from province to province. In Pakistan, these responsibilities changed with the passage of time. However, now the local government law of all provisional governments is similar to a large extent to the law of Punjab Province. Below some of the duties of a deputy commissioner are given:

- To supervise and monitor the discharge of duties by the Assistant Commissioners in the district.
- Coordination of work of all the sister offices and public facilities in the district.
- Efficient use of public resources for the integrated development and effective service delivery.
- To supervise and coordinate the implementation of the government policies, instructions and guidelines of the Government.
- To support and facilitate the offices and public facilities in the district.
- May convene a meeting for purposes of maintaining public order and public safety and safeguarding public or private properties in the District; and, the decisions taken in the meeting shall be executed by all concerned accordingly.
- Deputy commissioner is able to hold court sessions in criminal cases as justice of the peace, and monitors the performance of the assistant commissioner within the district.

== See also ==
- Chief secretary
- Commissioner
- Assistant commissioner
- Punjab public service commission
- Pakistan Administrative Service
