= PS-73 Sujawal-I =

Constituency of the Provincial Assembly of Sindh, Pakistan

- Constituency for the Provincial Assembly of Sindh
- Region: Mirpur Bathoro Tehsil and Sujawal Tehsil (partly) including Sujawal city of Sujawal District

Current constituency
- Party: PPP
- Member: Shah Hussain Shah Sheerazi
- Created from: PS-86 Thatta-III (2002-2018); PS-75 Sujawal-I (2018-2023)

PS-73 Sujawal-I (پی ایس-73، سجاول-1) is a constituency of the Provincial Assembly of Sindh.

== General elections 2024 ==
Provincial election 2024: PS-73 Sujawal-I
Party	Candidate	Votes	%	±%
PPP	Shah Hussain Shah Sheerazi	72,567	85.18	
JUI (F)	Muhammad Ismail Memon	6,052	7.10	
TLP	Dhani Dino Jakhro	3,368	3.95	
Others	Others (thirteen candidates)	3,204	3.77	
Turnout		87,514	40.41	
Total valid votes		85,191	97.35	
Rejected ballots		2,323	2.65	
Majority		66,515	78.08	
Registered electors		216,549		
PPP hold				

== General elections 2018 ==
Provincial election 2018: PS-75 Sujawal-I
Party	Candidate	Votes	%	±%
PPP	Syed Shah Hussain Shah Sheerazi	61,422	78.27	
MMA	Muhammad Ismail Memon	7,362	9.38	
Independent	Najaf Ali Khan Laghari	2,906	3.70	
Independent	Mukhtiar Ali	1,834	2.34	
Independent	Najaf Ali	1,776	2.26	
Independent	Nazir Ahmed Soomro	1,458	1.86	
PTI	Sunny	599	0.76	
Independent	Abdul Ghani Mallah	461	0.59	
Independent	Syed Naseer Ahmed Shah Sheerazi	276	0.35	
Independent	Abdul Rehman Mallah	253	0.32	
Independent	Parveen Laghari	128	0.16	
Majority		54,060	68.89	
Valid ballots		78,475		
Rejected ballots		3,588		
Turnout		82,063		
Registered electors		188,436		
hold				

== General elections 2013 ==
Contesting candidates	Party affiliation	Votes polled

== General elections 2008 ==
Contesting candidates	Party affiliation	Votes polled

== See also ==
- PS-72 Badin-V
- PS-74 Sujawal-II
