= Mirpur Sakro =

Town in Pakistan

Coordinates: 24°33′N 67°38′E

- Interactive map of Mirpur Sakro
- Country: Pakistan
- Province: Sindh

Population (2023 Census)
  - Total: 12,454

Mirpur Sakro (Sindhi: ميرپورساڪرو,) is a town located 33 km away from Thatta District, in Sindh, Pakistan. The town is 85 km away from Karachi. Mirpur Sakro is at an altitude of 35 meters. It is a small area having a population of around 12,454 in 2023 census. The native language spoken here is Sindhi. The most prominent aspects of this village is its connectivity to 88-km-long Gharo-Keti Bunder highway and the Sakro Qabrustan (graveyard) which is around 2 km wide located in the middle of the village. Mirpur Sakro is accessed by both cars and busses.

People of the Sakro area usually work in fields and are farmers by profession or they are somehow linked to agriculture to support their livelihood. Agriculture is usually carried out through irrigation which is possible in the area as Mirpur Sakro lies quite close to Sindh River. The landscape of the village comprises long cultivated fields. The infrastructure of Sakro is not very advanced as there are usually cob houses while the roads are kachi (unpaved). There are small health-care centers or personal clinics here. Mirpur Sakro has two government schools and a few private schools like Aga Khan School & The Citizens Foundation school.

In inhabitants of Mirpur Sakro the Sindhi tribes and some Baloch tribes have been settled here for three centuries.
