= Molvi Ahmed Mallah =

Sindhi litterateur

- مولوي احمد ملاح
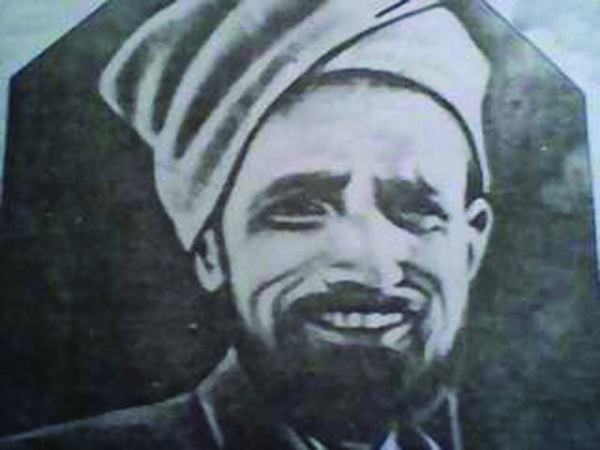
- Born: Ahmed; 1 February 1877; Kundi, Deh Lohan, Badin District Sindh, British India
- Died: 19 July 1969 (aged 92); Badin, Sindh, Pakistan
- Occupations: Poet, Translator
- Writing career
- Pen name: "احمد ملاح"
- Genre: Aesthetic
- Subject: Poetry
- Notable works: Poetic Translation of Quran, Poetry
- Notable awards: Pride of Performance Award by the President of Pakistan (1978)
- Literary movement: Progressive

Molvi Ahmed Mallah (Sindhi: مولوي احمد ملاح) (1 February 1877 – 19 July 1969) was a Sindhi poet and writer from Pakistan.

== Early life ==
Molvi Ahmed Mallah was born to Nangio Mallah on 1 February 1877 in village Kundi, Deh Lohan, Badin District, Sindh, British India. He was a moderate Islamic Mullah and had translated Quran in Sindhi in his own poetic way. Mallah was a folk and national poet of Sindh.

Hailing from a poor family, he was known to be intelligent, and well-mannered in his demeanor. He looked after his herd of animals. Mallah used to sing old songs and tried to fit his own poetry of nazms in the traditional Sindhi folk melodies.

== Education ==
Molvi Ahmed Mallah received education in a religious school of Hafiz Abdullah Mandhro. To acquire further education, he went to Badin, Bugra Memon, Toha, Sujawal and other cities, from where he received the education of Sindhi, Arabic, Persian, jurisprudence and Hadith. Finally, he earned a religious degree to impart religious education. His last teacher was Molana Khair Muhammad Magsi.

== Political career ==
Mallah chose teaching as a profession. When the Khilafat Movement started, he enthusiastically participated in it and delivered very emotional speeches. Believing him to be a threat to the government, he was imprisoned. After being freed from the jail, he started to teach in the religious school Mazhar-ul-Uloom of Pir Ali Shah. In 1932, due to the Sunni-Wahabi movement, he bid farewell to the school and purchased his own plot in Badin, where he established his own religious school and appointed renowned religious scholars like Mumtaz Alam, Molvi Gul Muhammad, Molvi Abdul Wahab, and Molvi Abdul Ghafoor. Nowadays, it is known as Muslim School Gharibabad. The adjacent mosque to this religious School gives memories of this great man.

== Literary career ==
Molvi Ahmed Mallah gained a good name in Sindhi poetry and prose, when he actually started writing. His poetic qualities gave him an elevated literary status. He fought against useless dogmas, social evils of society. His poetry is an essential part of Friday discourses in Sindhi mosques.

== Publications ==
Molvi Ahmed Mallah wrote books in poetry and prose. Some of his published works are: Marafatallah (1936), Hakiraee Haq (1951), Fateh Lawari (1958), Bayaz Ahmed (1964), Paigham Ahmed (1969), Dewan Ahmed (1974) and Israr Ellahi.

He translated Islamic holy book Quran in a poetic way with the title of “Noor ul Qur’an”. He was the first person who translated the complete Quran into Sindhi in a poetic way, which was first published in 1969 by Arbab Allah Jurio. His poetic songs are sung all over Sindh. Radio Pakistan often broadcast his songs in the voice of many different local singers.

== Awards and recognition ==
In 1978, Mallah was posthumously awarded Pride of Performance award by the Government of Pakistan in recognition of his literary services.

A school was named after Mallah called 'Molvi Ahmed Mallah School' by the provincial Government of Sindh.

There is a library named after him in the city of Badin, Sindh, Pakistan.

== Death ==
Mallah died on 19 July 1969 at a hospital in Badin, Pakistan. He is buried in his native village.

On his 50th death anniversary in 2019, rich tributes were paid to him at the Badin Press Club by a large number of poets, journalists and writers.

"The poetry of Mallah was against illiteracy and rotten customs of the society adding that Mallah had revolted against the futile customs of the society".

== See also ==
- Mallaah, subcaste of traditional boatmen
