= Shahbandar Tehsil =

Taluka in Sindh, Pakistan

Shahbandar تحصیل شاہبندر Shah Bunder
- Tehsil (Taluka)
- Location in Sindh, Pakistan Shahbandar (Pakistan)
- Coordinates: 24°9′36″N 67°54′0″E
- Country: Pakistan
- Province: Sindh
- District: Sujawal
- Taluka transferred to Sujawal District: 12 October 2013

Government
  - Type: Tehsil Municipal Administration

Area
  - Total: 3,074 km^{2} (1,187 sq mi)

Population (2023)
  - Total: 168,911
  - Density: 54.95/km^{2} (142.3/sq mi)

Literacy
  - Literacy rate: 15.97%
- Time zone: UTC+5 (PST)

Shahbandar Tehsil, also known as Shah Bunder (Sindhi: شاهه بندر; Urdu: شاہ بندر), is a tehsil (taluka) and administrative subdivision of Sujawal District in the Sindh province of Pakistan. Its administrative headquarters is the town of Shahbandar, a historical port settlement on the Indus Delta.

Situated in the south-eastern coastal belt of Sindh, between the Arabian Sea and the deltaic mouth of the Indus, Shahbandar is one of the five talukas that constitute Sujawal District; the others are Jati, Kharochan, Mirpur Bathoro and Sujawal.

== Administrative history ==
The taluka was transferred to the newly created Sujawal District on 12 October 2013, by a notification of the Revenue Department of the Government of Sindh bifurcating the former Thatta District under Section 6 of the Sindh Land Revenue Act, 1967. Under the notification, Sujawal District, Sindh's 28th district at the time of its creation, was to comprise the talukas of Sujawal, Shahbandar, Mirpur Bathoro and Jati, together with most of Kharochan (with the exception of ten Deh (Mouza) retained within Thatta District).

Shahbandar had previously served as a taluka headquarters under British administration. A municipality was established at the town on 20 July 1856, and in the 1870s the taluka was administered within the Shahbandar deputy collectorate of the Karachi District.

== Geography ==
Shahbandar Tehsil covers an area of 3,074 square kilometres (1,187 sq mi). It occupies the south-easternmost part of the Indus Delta, bordered by the Arabian Sea to the south and by Sir Creek, a disputed border channel separating the Sindh coast from the Indian state of Gujarat, to the south-east. A substantial portion of the taluka consists of tidal flats, mangrove creeks and salt waste. According to regional descriptions, the south-eastern quadrant of the Indus Delta, including much of Shahbandar and the adjoining Jati Taluka, contains extensive salt pans, and the Sirganda salt deposits lie between the Sir and Khori creeks.

== History ==
=== Founding and early development ===
The coastal area around present-day Shahbandar has a long history as a port district of the lower Indus Delta. The port town from which the taluka takes its name lay on a distributary channel of the Indus during the eighteenth century and served, for a period, as a principal seaport of Kalhora Sindh. According to the eighteenth-century chronicle Tuhfat-ul-Kiram, as cited in Hughes's 1874 gazetteer, the town was founded in 1759 by the Kalhora ruler Mian Ghulam Shah Kalhoro (1757–1772), who built a fort there and stationed military materiel at the site, near his newly founded capital of Shahgarh. An earlier settlement of the same name is reported to have been founded in the 1550s by Mirza Isa Tarkhan of the Tarkhan dynasty.

In 1758, Ghulam Shah Kalhoro issued a parwana (permit) authorising the British East India Company to establish a trading factory at Shahbandar, restoring a Company presence in Sindh that had briefly existed at Thatta from 1635 until its closure in 1662. The factory operated until 1775, when it was closed.

=== Navigation and peak ===
According to Hughes's gazetteer, navigation to the port was complicated by the absence of a direct navigable channel: ships reached Shahbandar via the Rechal mouth of the Indus and a circuitous route up the Hajamro and Bagana creeks. A beacon known as the munāra, resembling a minaret, had been constructed at the Rechal mouth as a navigational aid, though no trace of it remained by 1837. The same source reports that the town's population reached approximately 50,000 by 1778, at what is described as its commercial peak; figures of this scale should be treated with caution, given the limited contemporary evidence available for deltaic towns of the period.

=== Decline ===
Accounts of the port's decline vary. The 1874 British gazetteer attributed it to the effects of the 1819 Rann of Kutch earthquake, which caused extensive flooding and, according to the same source, altered the course of the Indus such that Shahbandar no longer lay on the river. The historian Amita Paliwal has argued, on the basis of earlier documentary evidence, that decline had begun before this, with the harbour reportedly blocked during the last quarter of the eighteenth century. In either interpretation, much of the town's population and commercial activity subsequently relocated to Karachi, whose rise as a principal regional port during the early nineteenth century is associated with Shahbandar's declining prominence.

=== Late nineteenth century ===
By the time of Hughes's 1874 gazetteer, the town's recorded population had fallen to approximately 400, of whom around 100 were Muslims (principally Memons, Shikaris and Mohanas) and around 300 Hindus (principally Lohanas). The town housed a police thana, a staging bungalow and a cattle pound, and served as the headquarters of a taluka. Shahbandar also gave its name to a deputy collectorate within the Karachi District, although the deputy collector was customarily resident at Jhirk.

== Demographics ==
At the 2023 census, Shahbandar Tehsil had a recorded population of 168,911. At the 2017 census, the figure was 159,748, comprising 142,021 rural and 17,727 urban residents, at a population density of approximately 52 inhabitants per square kilometre. The 1998 census had recorded a population of 100,575.

District-level linguistic and religious data from the 2023 census indicate that Sindhi is the first language of the substantial majority of residents of Sujawal District, and that Islam is the predominant religion, with a small Hindu minority; these figures are at district rather than taluka level.

== Economy ==
The taluka's economy is principally based on agriculture and fisheries, with associated trade. Principal crops across Sujawal District include wheat, rice, sugarcane and cotton, and livestock rearing and fisheries are reported as significant activities in the coastal talukas.

The Shah Bandar exploration block, which extends across parts of Shahbandar Tehsil and adjoining areas of Thatta District, was awarded to Pakistan Petroleum Limited (PPL) in February 2014. According to information published by PPL, the block is operated as a joint venture with Mari Petroleum Company Limited, Sindh Energy Holding Company Limited and Government Holdings (Private) Limited. Gas was first reported at the block's Benari X-1 well in December 2018, with production commencing in May 2021 and processed at the nearby Sujawal gas processing facility.

== Natural hazards ==
The taluka's low-lying coastal and deltaic situation makes it exposed to tropical cyclones, tidal surges and seasonal flooding. In June 2023, villages in Shahbandar were among those affected by Cyclone Biparjoy, which prompted the evacuation of residents from low-lying parts of Sujawal District. Reporting on subsequent cyclonic activity in the Rann of Kutch region has described the Sindh coast as being among the areas exposed to such events.

== See also ==
- Sujawal District
- Shahbandar, Pakistan
- Indus Delta
- List of districts in Sindh
