= Marho Kotri Wildlife Sanctuary =

Coordinates: 25.2680°N 67.1880°E

Marho Kotri Wildlife Sanctuary is located on Arabian Sea coast along Indus River Delta in Thatta District, Sindh, Pakistan.
