= List of districts in Sindh =

Districts of Sindh

Districts of Sindh
- Districts of Sindh, colour-coded by division
- Location: Sindh, Pakistan
- Number: 30 (as of 2023)
- Government: District Government; City District Government; Zilla Council
- Subdivisions: Tehsils; Union councils

There are thirty districts in the Pakistan province of Sindh. These districts together contain 138 tehsils as of 2023.

They comprised 1,100 Union Councils and 66,923 human settlements, as per the 1998 census. Each district has a headquarter, often referred to as the capital of the district.

Karachi, the capital of Sindh, is the most populous city district, as well as the most densely populated. It was initially a single district, which has now been further subdivided into East, West, South, Central, Malir, Keamari and Korangi districts.

In 2023, the Sindh government opted to rename four districts in the Karachi Division, East District to Gulshan, West District to Orangi, South District to simplified Karachi, Central District to Nazimabad, while the other three districts, Malir, Keamari and Korangi retained their names.

== History ==
=== Colonial era ===
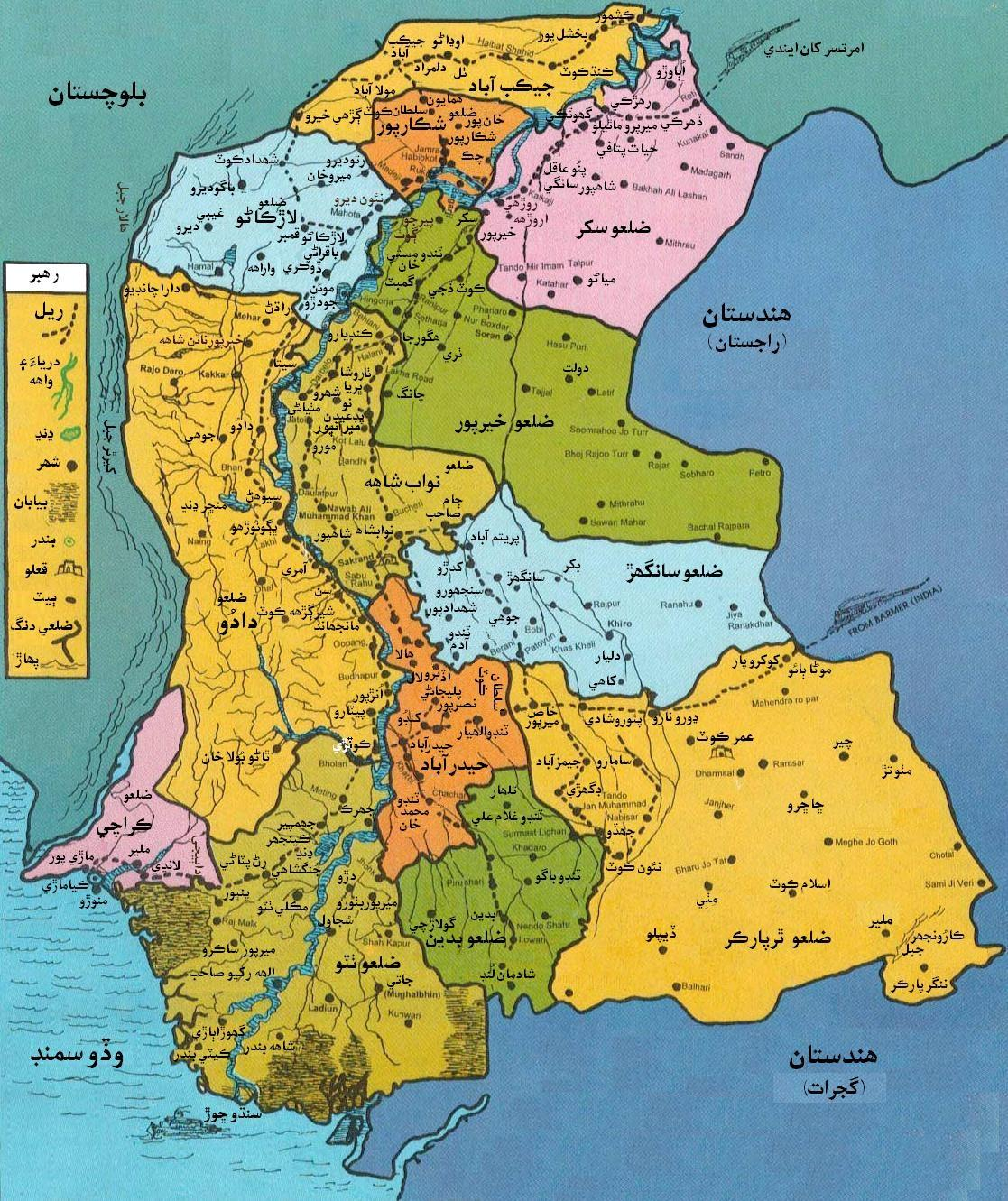
An old map of Sindh

In 1839, the British Invaded the Sind. On 1843's annexation Sind was merged into Bombay Presidency and form a division of Bombay Presidency.

Districts and divisions were both introduced in Sind as administrative units by the British when Sind became a part of British India, and ever since then, they have formed an integral part in the civil administration of the Sind. At the time in 1843, the Sind was divided into three districts. Khairpur state was administered separately as a princely state.

The administration was as given below:

Sind Division

- Hyderabad District
- Karachi District
- Shikarpur District

In 1846-47 Upper Sind Frontier district headquarter was Khangarh (Jacobabad) carved out of Shikarpur district.

In 1882, British government create a new district named Thar and Parkar by bifurcation of Hyderabad district and In 1883, Headquarter of Shikarpur district was shifted from Shikarpur to Sukkur.

On 1 August 1901, British government split Shikarpur and Karachi district to create Larkana district and district status of Shikarpur also shifted to Sukkur.

On 1 November 1912, Hyderabad district again split to create Nawabshah district.

In 1931, British government divided Karachi and Larkana district to create Dadu district.

On April 1, 1936, Sind was separated from Bombay Presidency to form a separate province of British India. At that time Sind division changed to form Hyderabad division.

Just before the independence of Pakistan, the districts of Sind were:

- Hyderabad District
- Karachi District
- Sukkur District
- Upper Sind Frontier District
- Thar and Parkar District
- Larkana District
- Nawabshah District
- Dadu District

=== 1947-1955 ===
In 1947's partition, Sind joined Pakistan.

In 1948, Karachi district split into two districts to create Thatta district and Karachi district separated from Sind province to create the new Federal Capital Territory.

In 1952, Upper Sind Frontier district was renamed to Jacobabad district.

In 1953, Thar and parkar and Nawabshah district also split into two districts to create Sanghar district.

On 14 October 1955, Khairpur state merged into Sind province and gave the status of district or divisional headquarter.

In 1955, the districts were:

Hyderabad Division

- Hyderabad District
- Thar and Parkar District
- Dadu District
- Thatta District
- Sanghar District

Khairpur Division

- Khairpur District
- Sukkur District
- Jacobabad District
- Larkana District
- Nawabshah District

=== 1955-1970 ===
On 30 September 1955, to diminish the differences between the two wings of Pakistan, the 'One Unit' programme merged the four provinces of West Pakistan into a single province to parallel the province of East Pakistan (now Bangladesh).

In 1959, the Federal Capital Territory was merged with West Pakistan and in 1960, Karachi Bela Division was formed comprising Karachi District and Las Bela District.

=== 1970-present ===
On 1 July 1970, West Pakistan was abolished and the four provinces were restored as in 1955.

In 1972, the Lasbela district transferred to Kalat division of Balochistan Province and Karachi district divided into three districts in a new Karachi Division.

- South Karachi District
- East Karachi District
- West Karachi District

In 1975, a new district was formed – Badin district carved out of Hyderabad district and Abolish Khairpur Division and replace it with Sukkur Division۔

In 1977, Shikarpur district again was re-maintained.

In the 1980s, Larkana Division was established by bifurcation of Sukkur Division.

In 1983, Sukkur district again spitting out to form Ghotki district.

In 1989, Naushahro Feroze district carved out of Nawabshah district.

On 31 October 1990, Mirpurkhas district carved out of Tharparkar district and Spelt Hyderabad Division to established Mirpur khas Division.

On 17 April 1993, Tharparkar district again spilt out to form Umerkot district.

In 1996, two more districts were created in the Karachi division;Central and Malir district.

In 2000, the five districts of Karachi division was merged and create Karachi city district and the government of Pakistan abolished divisions throughout the country.

In 2004, three new districts were formed - Qambar Shahdadkot district carved out of Larkana district; Jamshoro district out of the Dadu district and Kashmore district out of Jacobabad district.

In 2005, Hyderabad district was carved out to form three new districts of Tando Muhammad Khan, Matiari and Tando Allahyar.

In September 2008, Sindh Cabinet renamed the Nawabshah district to Shaheed Benazirabad.

On 11 July 2011, Government restored Administration division.

On 7 August 2011, Shaheed Benazirabad district transferred from Sukkur to Hyderabad division.

In October 2013, two new districts were formed - Sujawal District was carved out of Thatta District and Korangi district was carved out of East district.

In 2020, Keamari District was created after splitting Karachi West District.

== Proposed districts ==
Sindh government had announced the plan the three new districts

Proposed District	Proposed Headquarters	Current District	Division
Chhachro	Chhachro	Tharparkar district	Mirpur Khas division
Thari Mirwah district	Thari Mirwah	Khairpur district	Sukkur division
Shahdadpur district	Shahdadpur	Sanghar district	Shaheed Benazirabad division

Additional demands for new districts
From time to time, several ministers and elected representatives, such as MLAs and MPs, have proposed the following new districts:

Proposed District	Proposed Headquarters	Current District	Division
Mirpur Mathelo district	Mirpur Mathelo	Ghotki district	Sukkur division
Ubauro district	Ubauro	Ghotki district	Sukkur division
Ghotki district	Ghotki	Ghotki district(at Mirpur Mathelo)	Sukkur division
Rohri district	Rohri	Sukkur district	Sukkur division
Pano Aqil district	Pano Aqil	Sukkur district	Sukkur division
Dokri district	Dokri	Larkana district	Larkana division
Qambar district	Qambar	Qambar Shahdadkot district	Larkana division
Shahdadkot district	Shahdadkot	Qambar Shahdadkot district	Larkana division
Mehar district	Mehar	Dadu district	Hyderabad division
Sehwan district	Sehwan Sharif	Jamshoro district	Hyderabad division
Matli district	Matli	Badin district	Hyderabad division
Tando Bago district	Tando Bago	Badin district	Hyderabad division
Kot Ghulam Muhammad district	Kot Ghulam Muhammad	Mirpur Khas district	Mirpur Khas division
Mithi district	Mithi	Tharparkar district	Mirpur Khas division
Diplo district	Diplo	Tharparkar district	Mirpur Khas division
Tharparkar district	Nagarparkar	Tharparkar district(at Mithi)	Mirpur Khas division

== List of Districts by area, population, density, literacy rate etc. ==
District	Headquarter	Area (km^{2})	Population (2023)	Density (/km^{2})	Literacy rate (2023)	Division
Badin	Badin	6,858	1,947,081	284.6	46.65%	Hyderabad
Dadu	Dadu	7,866	1,742,320	221.8	57.13%	Hyderabad
Ghotki	Mirpur Mathelo	6,083	1,772,609	291.3	51.38%	Sukkur
Hyderabad	Hyderabad	993	2,432,540	2,448.7	77.21%	Hyderabad
Jacobabad	Jacobabad	2,698	1,174,097	434.0	52.34%	Larkana
Jamshoro	Jamshoro	11,204	1,117,308	99.7	59.63%	Hyderabad
Karachi Central	North Nazimabad	69	3,822,325	55,838.8	93.55%	Karachi
Karachi East	Gulshan e Iqbal	139	3,921,742	28,220.1	90.07%	Karachi
Karachi South	Saddar Karachi	122	2,329,764	19,104.6	88.57%	Karachi
Karachi West	Orangi Town	370	2,679,380	7,238.1	77.43%	Karachi
Kashmore	Kandhkot	2,580	1,233,957	477.3	45.59%	Larkana
Keamari	Moriro Mirbahar	559	2,068,451	3,699.8	72.07%	Karachi
Khairpur	Khairpur	15,910	2,597,535	163.3	60.14%	Sukkur
Korangi	Korangi	108	3,128,971	28,968.8	89.86%	Karachi
Larkana	Larkana	1,948	1,784,453	915.8	65.58%	Larkana
Malir	Malir	2,160	2,432,248	1,126.8	63.14%	Karachi
Matiari	Matiari	1,417	849,383	599.0	55.88%	Hyderabad
Mirpur Khas	Mirpur Khas	2,925	1,681,386	574.7	55.37%	Mirpur Khas
Naushahro Feroze	Naushahro Feroze	2,945	1,777,082	603.2	67.15%	Shaheed Benazir Abad
Qambar Shahdadkot	Qambar	5,475	1,514,869	276.4	50.02%	Larkana
Sanghar	Sanghar	10,728	2,308,465	215.0	53.66%	Mirpur Khas
Shaheed Benazirabad	Nawabshah	4,502	1,845,102	409.5	60.86%	Shaheed Benazirabad
Shikarpur	Shikarpur	2,512	1,386,330	552.1	53.70%	Larkana
Sujawal	Sujawal	8,785	839,292	95.5	37.02%	Hyderabad
Sukkur	Sukkur	5,165	1,639,897	317.7	68.26%	Sukkur
Tando Allahyar	Tando Allahyar	1,554	922,012	592.8	49.80%	Hyderabad
Tando Muhammad Khan	Tando Muhammad Khan	1,423	726,119	509.1	44.02%	Hyderabad
Tharparkar	Mithi	19,637	1,778,407	90.6	46.39%	Mirpur Khas
Thatta	Thatta	8,570	1,083,191	126.8	36.88%	Hyderabad
Umerkot	Umerkot	5,608	1,159,831	207.2	38.69%	Mirpur Khas

== See also ==
- List of tehsils of Sindh
- Districts of Pakistan
