= Sujawal District =

Pakistani administrative area

Coordinates: 24°36′23″N 68°4′19″E

Sujawal District: سجاول ضلعو; ضلع سجاول
- District of Sindh
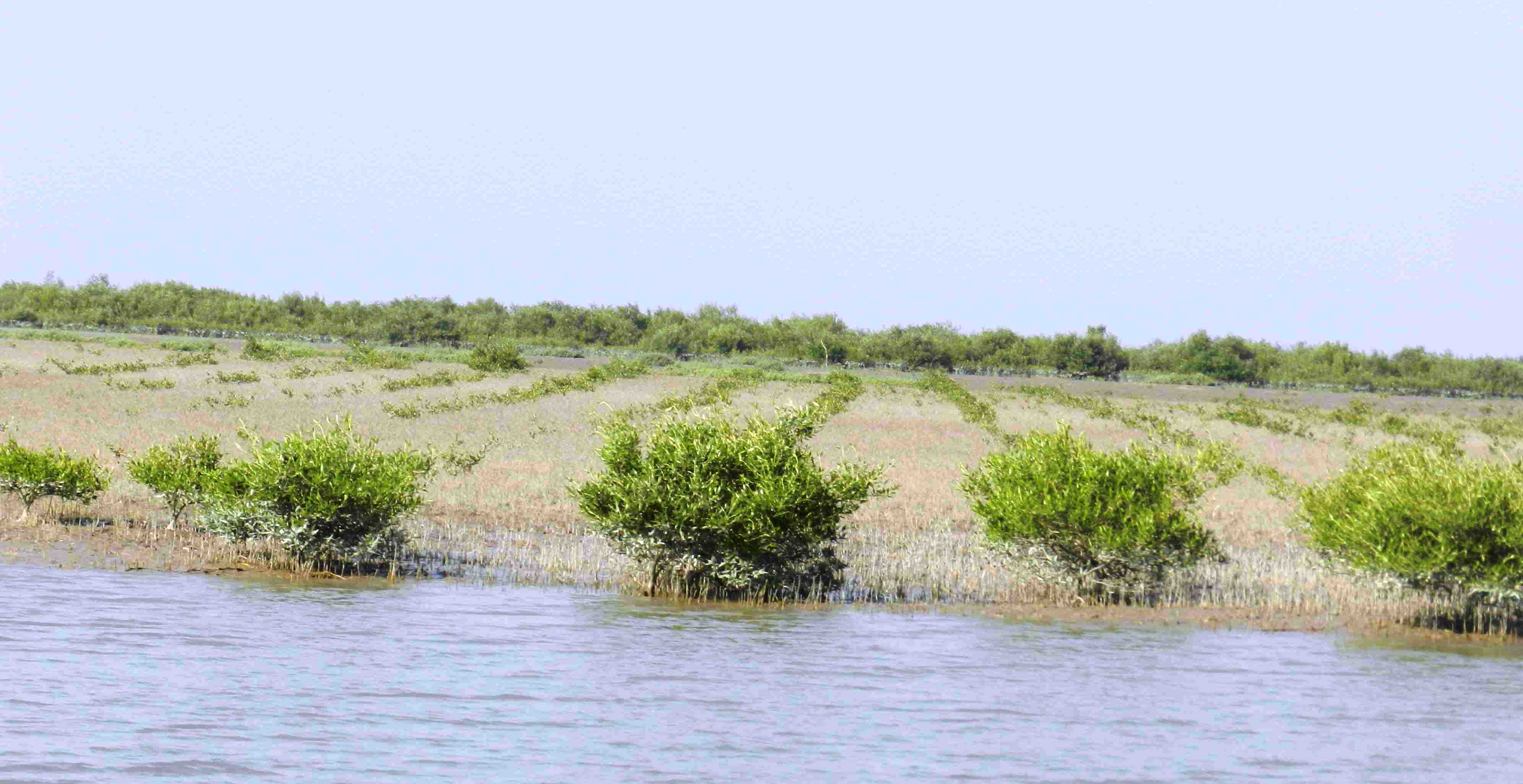
- Mangrove plantation near Shahbandar

- Map of Sindh with Sujawal District highlighted
- Country: Pakistan
- Province: Sindh
- Division: Hyderabad
- Established: 12 October 2013
- Headquarters: Sujawal

Government
  - Type: District Administration
  - Deputy Commissioner: N/A
  - District Police Officer: N/A
  - District Health Officer: N/A

Area
  - District of Sindh: 8,785 km^{2} (3,392 sq mi)

Population (2023)
  - District of Sindh: 839,292
  - Density: 95.54/km^{2} (247.4/sq mi)
  - Urban: 88,847
  - Rural: 750,445

Literacy
  - Literacy rate: Total: 37.66%; Male: 47.14%; Female: 27.44%
- Time zone: UTC+5 (PST)
- Number of Tehsils: 4
- Website: borsindh.gov.pk/

Sujawal District (Sindhi: سجاول ضلعو, Urdu: ضلع سجاول) is a district of the Sindh province of Pakistan. It is located at 24°36'23" North and 68°4'19" East and is bordered in the northwest by the Indus River, which separates it from Thatta District. The district has an area of 7,335 km^{2}.

== Administration ==
Sujawal District is subdivided into five tehsils:

Tehsil	Area (km²)	Pop. (2023)	Density (ppl/km²) (2023)	Literacy rate (2023)
Jati Tehsil	3,489	214,710	61.54	23.13%
Kharo Chan Tehsil	778	11,403	14.66	6.98%
Mirpur Bathoro Tehsil	698	231,735	332	32.01%
Shah Bandar Tehsil	3,074	168,911	54.95	15.97%
Sujawal Tehsil	746	212,533	284.9	35.02%

== History and geography ==
The decision to divide Thatta District into two districts by the provincial government was made on 12 October 2013 through a notification issued by the Revenue Department of Sindh. The provincial revenue department said:

A new district encompassing Sujawal, Kharo Chan Tehsil (barring 10 dehs), Mirpur Bathoro, Jati and Shah Bundar tehsils (talukas) would be Sindh’s 28th district to be called Sujawal. Its headquarters will be located in Sujawal tehsil (taluka). The new district has been established under Section 6 of the Sindh Land Revenue Act, 1967.

With this statement, Thatta district was split in half by the Indus River. The right side consisted of the Thatta district, and the left side will come under the jurisdiction of the newly created Sujawal District. Thatta District (among the largest districts of the province area-wise), will have half the size in its new boundaries, comprising Thatta, Mirpur Sakro, Keti Bunder and Ghorabari tehsils (talukas). In addition, some areas of Kharo Chhan Tehsil have also been included in the new Thatta District. The historical city of Thatta, which was once the capital of Sindh, was carved out from Karachi as a separate city in August 1948. It was the second largest district in Sindh, in terms of area, covering over 17,335 square kilometers before its recent separation into two parts. The Provincial Revenue Department of Sindh Notification 12 October 2013. There are two Provincial Assembly seats, Constituency PS-86 and Constituency PS-87, and one National Assembly seat, Constituency NA-238, in the newly formed districts of Sujawal.

== Demography ==
Historical population
Year	Pop.	±% p.a.
1951		—
1961		—
1972		—
1981		—
1998	513,702	—
2017	779,062	+2.22%
2023	839,292	+1.25%

As of the 2023 census, Sujawal district has 158,854 households and a population of 839,292. The district has a sex ratio of 108.71 males to 100 females and a literacy rate of 27.02%: 33.70% for males and 19.66% for females. 287,527 (34.26% of the surveyed population) are under 10 years of age. 88,847 (10.59%) live in urban areas.

Religions in Sujawal district (2023)
Religion	Percent
Islam	97.07%
Hinduism	2.65%
Other or not stated	0.28%

Religion in contemporary Sujawal district
Religious group	1941 (Note: 1941 census data is for Mirpur Bathoro, Shah Bunder, Sujawal and part of Jati taluka in erstwhile Karachi district, which roughly corresponds to the present district. Religion figures were calculated using the 1951 figures for population of current Sujawal district compared to the present district.)		2017		2023	
Religious group	Pop.	%	Pop.	%	Pop.	%
Islam	136,990	89.27%	755,255	96.94%	814,714	97.07%
Hinduism	14,868	9.69%	22,720	2.92%	22,247	2.65%
Sikhism	779	0.51%	—N/a	—N/a	13	~0%
Christianity	100	0.07%	678	0.09%	1,641	0.20%
Others (Note: Including Jainism, Christianity, Buddhism, Zoroastrianism, Judaism, Ad-Dharmis, or not stated)	715	0.46%	409	0.05%	677	0.08%
Total Population	153,452	100%	779,062	100%	839,292	100%

The majority religion, followed by 97.07% of the population, is Islam. Hinduism (including those from Scheduled Castes) is practiced by 2.65% of the population. Sindhi is the predominant language, spoken by 99.40% of the population.

== See also ==
- Thatta District
- List of talukas of Sindh
- Sindh
- Kot Aalam
