= Jati Taluka =

Pakistani administrative area

Jati جاتی تعلقو
- Administrative subdivision (Taluka) of Sujawal District
- Location in Pakistan Jati (Pakistan)
- Coordinates: 24°21′11″N 68°16′6″E
- Country: Pakistan
- Province: Sindh
- District: Sujawal
- Taluka: Jati

Government
  - Type: Tehsil Municipal Administration

Area
  - Total: 3,489 km^{2} (1,347 sq mi)

Population (2023)
  - Total: 214,710
  - Density: 6,154/km^{2} (15,940/sq mi)
- Time zone: UTC+5 (PST)
  - Summer (DST): UTC+4 (PDT)

Jati Taluka (Sindhi: جاتي تعلقو) is an administrative subdivision (Taluka) of Sujawal District in the province of Sindh, Pakistan. It is situated in the southern region of the country and is part of the newly created Sujawal District.

== Geography ==
Jati Taluka is located in the southern part of Sindh, Pakistan. It is bordered by the River Indus to the east, defining its boundary with the old Thatta district. To the west, it shares its border with other talukas of Sujawal District, including Mirpur Bathoro, Shah Bunder, Kharochan, and Sujawal Talukas.

== History ==
The historical significance of Jati Taluka lies in its role as an administrative subdivision within the larger Sujawal District. It became part of Sujawal District following the division of Thatta District by the Sindh government through a notification issued by the Sindh Revenue Department.

== Cyclone Biparjoy (2023) ==
In 2023, Jati Taluka was affected by Cyclone Biparjoy. The cyclone had a significant impact on the region, causing various challenges, including the temporary relocation of 5,000 people and the need for relief efforts.

== See also ==
- Sujawal District
- Thatta District
