= Sujawal =

Town in Sindh, Pakistan district

Sujawal سجاول
- Town
- Location within Sindh Location within Pakistan
- Coordinates: 24°36′11″N 68°4′45″E
- Country: Pakistan
- Province: Sindh
- District: Sujawal District

Population (2023)
  - Total: 38,736

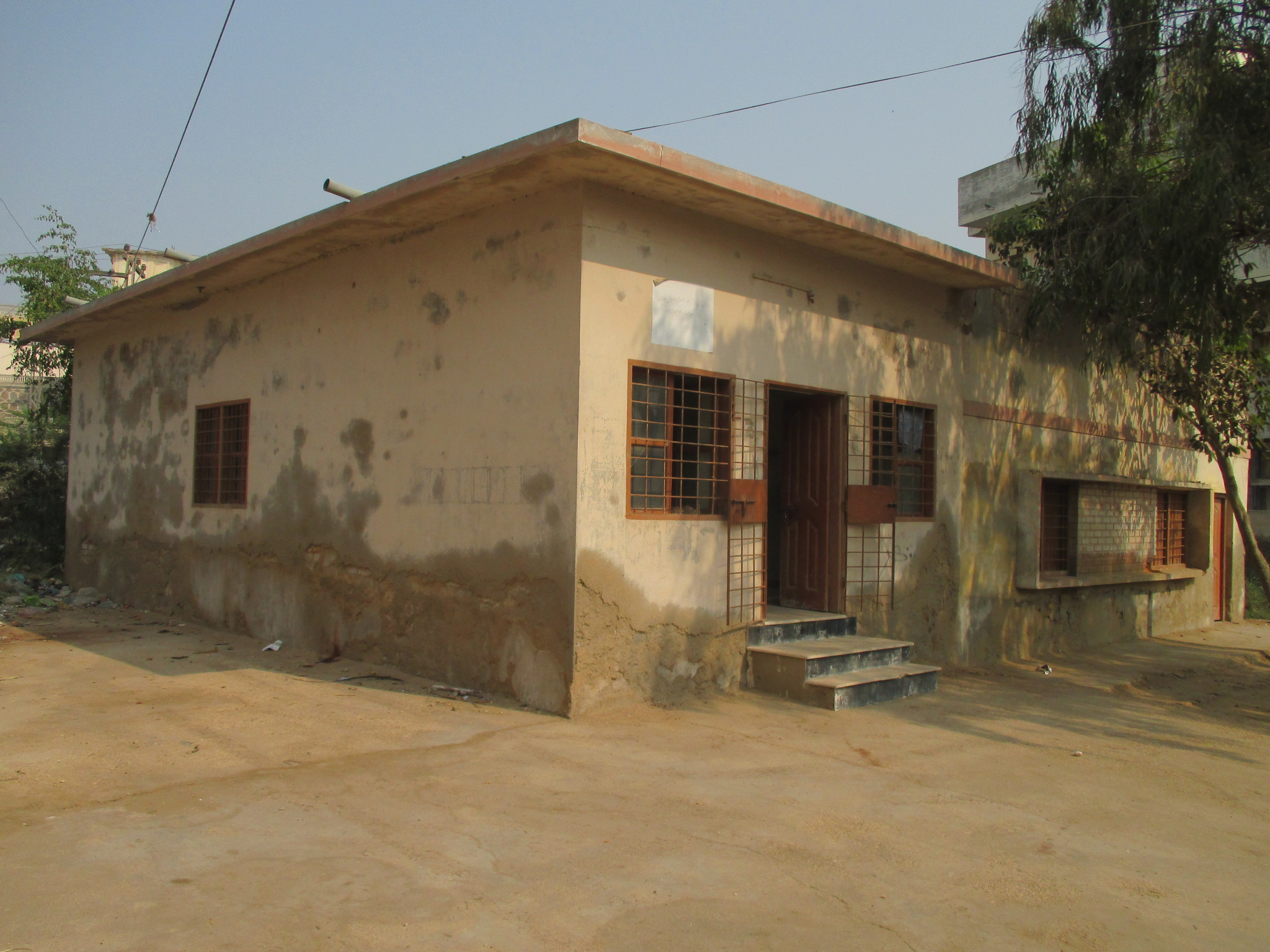
Post Office Sujawal

Sujawal (Urdu: سُجاول) is the administrative headquarters of Sujawal District in Sindh, Pakistan. Previously, it served as the sub-divisional headquarters of Sujawal Sub-Division in Thatta District, Sindh, Pakistan. The Government of Sindh upgraded Sujawal to district status, and after approval by the Chief Minister of Sindh, a notification was issued by the Revenue Department on 12 October 2013. The new district comprises Sujawal, Kharo Chan, Mirpur Bathoro, Jati, and Shahbandar talukas. It is located approximately 20 km west of Thatta, on the road between Badin and Karachi. It is an agricultural city with a few nearby industries. Sujawal is a multi-ethnic and multi-religious city, home to various communities and sects.

Sujawal has a moderate climate. Winters are cold and summers are somewhat hot, and the area also experiences high humidity. Sujawal is located near the sea. During winter, seasonal birds migrate from Siberia and Russia to the lakes in this area. The Indus River is home to a famous fish called Palla, which is well known in this region. However, the breeding of this fish has been declining every year due to water shortages in the Indus River. It has been an important political center of the district. Major political parties in Sujawal include the Pakistan People's Party (PPP), Muttahida Qaumi Movement–Pakistan (MQM-P), Jamiat Ulema-e-Islam (F), Pakistan Muslim League (N), Jamiat Ulema-e-Pakistan (JUP), Pakistan Muslim League Functional (PML-F), Jeay Sindh Qaumi Mahaz (JSQM), Pakistan Peoples Party Shaheed Bhutto (PPPSB), and others. There are two Provincial Assembly seats (PS-73 Sujawal-I and PS-74 Sujawal-II) and one National Assembly seat (NA-224 Sujawal) in the District Sujawal.

== History ==
According to historian Aziz Jafrani, the town of Sujawal was originally known as Maanjar due to its wetlands. The late 16th-century Ain-i-Akbari lists Maanjar as one of the 18 mahals of the Sarkar of Thatta, with a yearly revenue of 1,221,752 dams. The name "Sujawal" dates from the time of the Talpur dynasty in the late 1700s. A fisherman named Sujawal Khaskheli, who came from the village of Maanjar, correctly predicted the birth of a son to Mir Fateh Ali Khan Talpur, the ruler of Sindh. Mir Fateh Ali Khan Talpur rewarded him with gifts of land and precious jewels, and renamed the village of Maanjar to Sujawal in his honor.

== Demographics ==
=== Population ===
According to the 2023 census, Sujawal had population of 38,736.

Historical population
Year	Pop.	±% p.a.
1972	12,715	—
1981	14,961	+1.82%
1998	23,286	+2.64%
2017	35,308	+2.22%
2023	38,736	+1.56%
