= Shahbandar, Pakistan =

Pakistani town

Shahbandar Shāhbandar
- Location in Sindh Shahbandar (Pakistan)
- Coordinates: 24.166207°N 67.901972°E
- Country: Pakistan
- Region: Sindh
- District: Sujawal
- Tehsil: Shahbandar

Population (2017)
  - Total: 362
- Time zone: UTC+5 (PST)
  - Summer (DST): UTC+4 (PDT)

Shahbandar, also Shah Bandar, (Note: (Sindhi: شاه بندر, Urdu: شاہ بندر)) is a historical port town in Sujawal District, Sindh, Pakistan. During its heyday in the late 1700s, Shahbandar reportedly was home to as many as 50,000 people, but it soon lost its port access and went into a steep decline.

As of 2017, Shahbandar has a population of 362, in 100 households.

== Name ==
According to the 1874 British gazetteer of Sindh, the name Shāhbandar means “the king’s port”, because it once served as the home port for the Sindhi navy. The name is variously transliterated, with variants including Shahbunder, Shahbundar, and Shah Bandar.

A different Shahbandar was also founded sometime during the 1550s by Mirza Isa Tarkhan of the Tarkhan dynasty, according to the Tuhfat-ul-Kiram.

== History ==
Shah Bandar was a prominent trading port of Sindh under the Kalhora dynasty. The British East India Company established a trading factory in Shahbandar in 1758 during the Kalhora Dynasty.

According to the Tuhfat-ul-Kiram, Shahbandar was founded in 1759 by Mian Ghulam Shah Kalhoro, who built a fort there and “collected all materials of war there”. It was described as being near Shahgarh, his newly founded capital.

In Shahbandar’s heyday, it lay on a distributary channel of the Indus, and the water was deep enough for ships to reach it. However, the only navigable mouth was the Rechal mouth, which was on a different distributary, so ships had to take a circuitous route to get to Shahbandar. From the Rechal mouth, they would sail up the Hajamro creek to the point where it joined the Bagana creek, and then they would sail downstream on the Bagana to reach Shahbandar.

A “high beacon”, called the Munāra because of its resemblance to a minaret, was built at the Rechal mouth to aid navigation. No trace of it remained by 1837, although a nearby village preserved the name.

When a shift in the course of the Indus left the port of Aurangabandar high and dry, the British factory there was moved to Shahbandar. The Shahbandar factory was closed down in 1775.

In 1778, Shahbandar’s population was reportedly as high as 50,000.

According to the 1874 British gazetteer, Shahbandar went into decline after an earthquake in 1819 caused major flooding which altered the course of the Indus so that Shahbandar no longer lay on the river. On the other hand, according to Amita Paliwal, Shahbandar may have already been in decline earlier, with its harbour being “blocked” in the last quarter of the 1700s. In any case, most of Shahbandar’s population and commercial activity ended up moving to Karachi, and the town itself “dwindled into obscurity”.

A municipality was established at Shahbandar on 20 July 1856. As of 1874, Shahbandar was home to about 400 people, roughly 100 Muslims (mostly Memons, Shikaris, and Mohanas) and 300 Hindus (mostly Lohanos). It served as the headquarters of a taluka and had a police thana with a staff of 13, as well as a staging bungalow and a cattle pound. Shahbandar was also the name of a deputy collectorate at the time, under the Karachi district, but the deputy collector usually lived at Jhirk, not Shahbandar.

The 1951 census recorded the village of Shahbandar as having an estimated population of about 270, in about 100 houses. It had a primary school, post office, and police station at that point.

== Demography ==
The Sindhis form the majority of the population of Shahbandar. There are also Baloch and Kutchi settled in Shahbandar. The population is predominantly Muslim with a small Hindu minority.

== See also ==
- Sindh Coastal Development Authority
- Shahbandar
- Lahori Bandar
