= Ghorabari =

Administrative division in Thatta, Pakistan

- Country: Pakistan
- Province: Sindh
- District: Thatta District

Ghorabari (Urdu: گھورا باڑی) is a taluka part of Thatta District in the Sindh province, Pakistan. It has a population of 174,088, and an area of 1018 square kilometres.

Khathore and Hayat Gaho forests in Ghorabari are expected to be the site of a 3,000-acre of palm oil tree cultivation by 2025 by the Sindh Coastal Development Authority.
