= Keti Bandar =

Pakistani town

- Location in Sindh Keti Bandar (Pakistan)
- Coordinates: 24°08′40″N 67°27′03″E
- Country: Pakistan
- Region: Sindh
- District: Thatta
- Taluka: Keti Bandar

Population (2017)
  - Total: 4,272
- Time zone: UTC+5 (PST)
  - Summer (DST): UTC+6 (PDT)

Keti Bandar (Urdu: کیٹی بندر, romanized: Kéti Bàndàr) is a historical port town in Thatta District, Sindh, Pakistan. Keti Bandar is also the name of one of the talukas, or administrative sub-divisions, of Thatta District.

== Demographics ==
As of 2017, Keti Bandar has a population of 4,272 with 270 households.

== See also ==
- Keti Bandar Port
