= Kharo Chan Tehsil =

Pakistani administrative area

Kharo Chan Kharo Chhan or Khharochhan
- Administrative subdivision (Taluka) of Sujawal District
- Location in Pakistan Kharo Chan (Pakistan)
- Coordinates: 24°05′N 67°57′E
- Country: Pakistan
- Province: Sindh
- District: Sujawal
- Taluka: Kharo Chan

Government
  - Type: Tehsil Municipal Administration

Area
  - Total: 778 km^{2} (300 sq mi)

Population (2023)
  - Total: 11,403
  - Density: 14.66/km^{2} (38.0/sq mi)
- Time zone: UTC+5 (PST)
  - Summer (DST): UTC+4 (PDT)
- Postal code: 74310

Kharo Chan Tehsil, also spelled Kharo Chhan Tehsil and Khharochhan, (Note: Sindhi: خارو چان, Urdu: کھارو چن) is an administrative subdivision (Tehsil or taluka) of Sujawal District in Sindh, Pakistan. It is one of the five talukas that make up the district. As of 2023, Kharo Chan had a population of approximately 11,403 and covers an area of 778 square kilometres. A significant portion of the tehsil lies within the Indus River Delta, an ecologically vital region.

== Challenges for population ==
In recent years, the taluka has been severely affected by extreme weather phenomena, including unprecedented flooding. These floods have been triggered by record-breaking rainfall across the province, with floodwaters from the upper reaches of the Indus River exacerbating the situation as they flowed into the province. This has led to significant challenges for the local population, particularly in terms of displacement and damage to infrastructure.

The increasing salinisation of floodwater has rendered the land unsuitable for agriculture. The acute water shortage, through the sea water intrusion further aggravating the problem, has led to land flight.

The construction of dams and barrages along the Indus River, coupled with insufficient downstream water flow, has led to sea intrusion into the delta. As less freshwater reaches the coastline—largely absorbed or diverted upstream—the advancing sea has gradually engulfed entire settlements. What was once a thriving region with 42 dehs (villages) has been reduced to just three. The submergence of the remaining villages has displaced thousands, compelling many to resettle in nearby areas or migrate to Karachi in search of more stable livelihoods.

Since 1988, when the population stood at 26,000, the taluka has experienced till 2023 over 56% decline, according to government census data.

== See also ==
- Sujawal District
- Districts of Sindh
- Sindh, Pakistan
- Sindhi Culture
