= Thatta District =

District in Sindh, Pakistan

Coordinates: 24°30′N 67°50′E

Thatta District: ٺٽو ضلعو; ضلع ٹھٹھہ
- District of Sindh
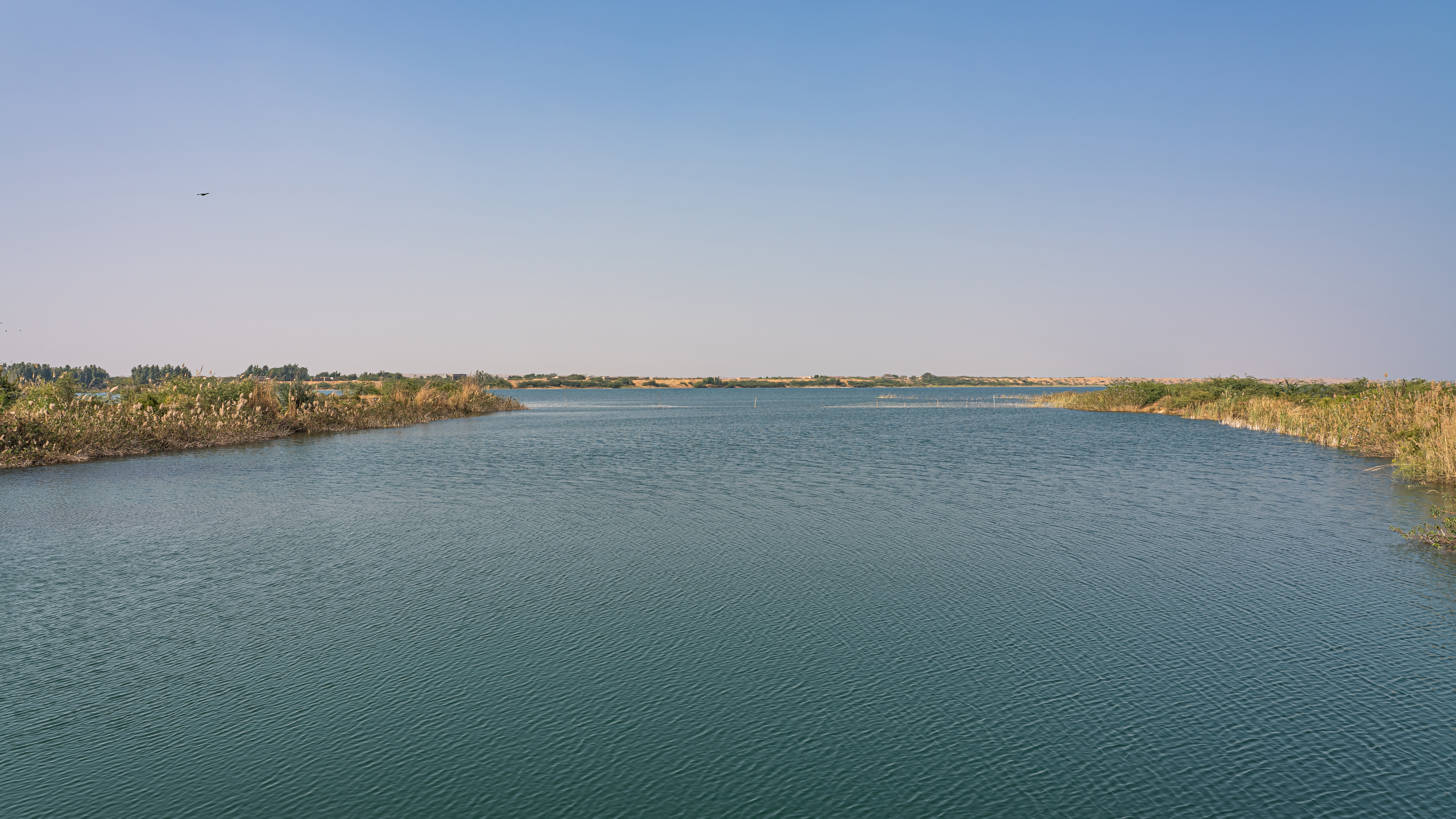
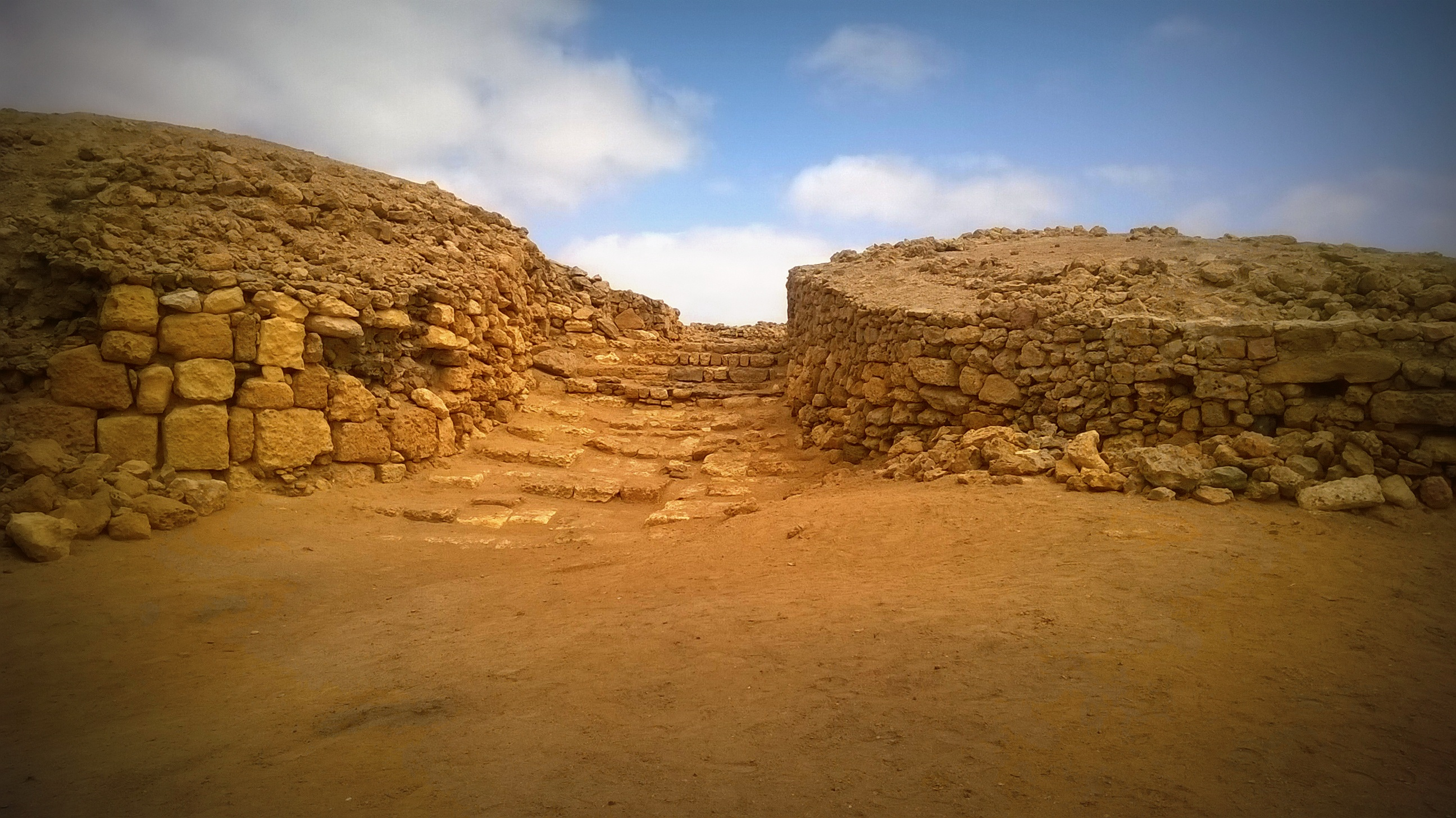
- Top: Keenjhar Lake; Bottom: Banbhore Fort

- Country: Pakistan
- Province: Sindh
- Division: Hyderabad
- Established: 1948
- Headquarters: Thatta

Government
  - Type: District Administration
  - Deputy Commissioner: N/A
  - District Police Officer: N/A
  - District Health Officer: N/A

Area
  - District of Sindh: 8,570 km^{2} (3,310 sq mi)

Population (2023)
  - District of Sindh: 1,083,191
  - Density: 126/km^{2} (327/sq mi)
  - Urban: 193,679 (17.88%)
  - Rural: 889,512

Literacy
  - Literacy rate: Total: 26.88%; Male: 33.23%; Female: 20.12%
- Time zone: UTC+5 (PST)
- Number of Tehsils: 7
- Website: www.districtthatta.gos.pk

Thatta District (Sindhi: ٺٽو ضلعو, Urdu: ضلع ٹھٹھہ) is located in the southern area locally called the Larr region of the province of Sindh, Pakistan. Its capital is Thatta. It is home to a large necropolis of Makli. In 2013, several talukas were separated to form the new Sujawal District.

== History ==
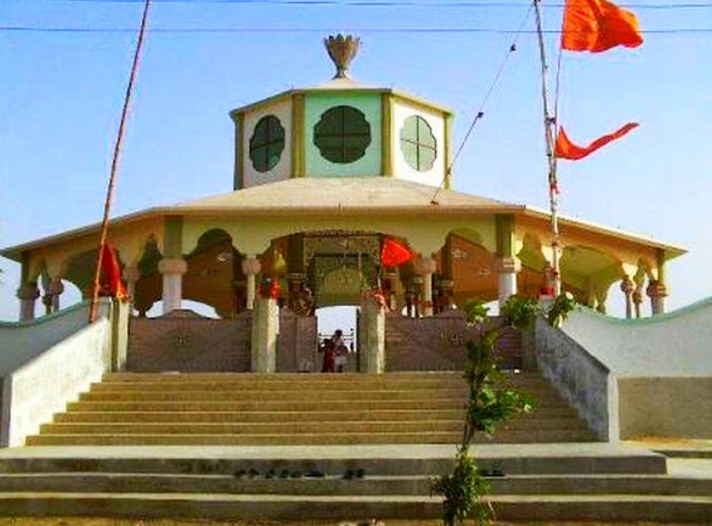
Mamaidev Astan is a 13th century shrine

The capital of three successive native Sindhi dynasties and later ruled by the Mughal. Thatta was the capital of three successive dynasties, the traces of which are evident in the Makli necropolis, which spreads over a twelve square kilometer area. These dynasties are: Samma (1335-1520), Arghun (1520-1555) and Tarkhan (1555-1665). Thatta was constantly embellished from the 14th to the 18th century. The remains of the city and its necropolis provide a unique view of civilization in Sindh. Thatta, about 98 km (61 mi) east of Karachi. Thatta also served as capital of Sindh and as a center for Islamic arts.

Since the 14th century four Muslim dynasties ruled Sindh from Thatta, but in 1739 the capital was moved elsewhere and Thatta declined. It was believed that this was the place where Alexander the Great rested his legions after their long march. The town is dominated by the Great Mosque built by the Moghul Emperor Shahjahan which has been carefully restored to its original condition. The mosque's 33 arched domes give it superb acoustics and the tile work, a whole range of shades of blue, is equally fine.

Situated on the outskirts of the new town, it is surrounded by narrow lanes and multi-story houses made of plaster and wood which are top by badgers, the wind catchers designed to funnel cool breezes down into the interiors of buildings. They are also quite common in Hyderabad.

The bazaars of Thatta are known for hand-printed fabrics, glass bangles and Sindhi embroidery work in laid with tinny mirrors, one of the more world known handicrafts of Pakistan. Thatta appears to have scarcely moved out of the 18th century and is only slowly catching up with the modern world.

The shifting nature of the Indus makes it difficult to discern the exact location of ancient Thatta, but the name indicates its strong relation to the Indus. Thatta, derived from Thatti, Thatt or Thatto, a Sindhi word for a small settlement on riverbanks, was an important medieval city locally known as Nagar-Thato. All historic accounts paint Thatta as a populous and flourishing trading post and a refuge of saints and scholars.

Jam Nizamu-d Din or Jam Ninda, as he was affectionately known, ruled in Sindh's golden age as the leader of Samma-dynasty from 866 to 1461. The rise of Thatta as an important commercial and cultural center was directly related to his patronage and policies. The Samma-civilization contributed significantly to the evolution of the prevailing architectural style that can be classified as Sindhi-Islamic.

Thatta is famous for its necropolis, which covers 10 km^{2} (3.9 sq mi) on the Makli Hill, which assumed its quasi-sacred character during Jam Nizamu-d Din's rule. The site became closely interlinked with the lives of the people. Every year thousands perform pilgrimage to this site to commemorate the saints buried here. The graves testify to a period of four centuries when Thatta was a thriving center of trade, religion and scholarly pursuits and the capital of Sind. In 1768, Thatta's per-eminence was usurped by Hyderabad. Though many of the mausoleums and graves are dilapidated, many are still exquisite architectural examples with fine stone carving and glazed tile decoration.

Jam Nizamu-d Din's death was followed by a war of succession carried out between the cousins, Jam Feroz and Jam Salahu-d Din. The Moghul army took the opportunity and Thatta came under the Arghun dynasty. The refined tastes of the Arghun and later the Tarkhan, who came from the Timurid cities of Khurasan and Central Asia enhanced Thatta's cultural and architectural landscape.

The reign of Mirza Isa Tarkhan's son Mirza Baki however, was one of persecution. He became reputed as one of the cruelest rulers of Sind. Thatta witnessed the cold-blooded murder of the Arghuns and the persecution of people claiming nobility, or religious or scholarly eminence. Mirza Jani Beg is known to have worked to restore what Mirza Baki had destroyed. However, when Emperor Akbar sent Nawab Khan Khanan to subjugate Thatta, Mirza Jani Beg is said to have removed the people to Kalan Kot, a fortified town built for such occasions, and ordered Thatta to be razed. Mirza Jani Beg negotiated with Mughals, and was taken to Emperor Akbar court where he was confirmed as the governor of Thatta, and in 1591, Sindh was annexed by the Mughal Empire. Mughal rule lasted till 1736 when Thatta passed into the hands of the Kalhoras. Thatta's importance began to gradually decline as the Indus River began to shift away and in 1768, Hyderabad was made the capital of Sindh by the Kalhora Nawabs.

The British annexed Sindh in 1843 and their immediate concern was to establish a communication network throughout Sindh. The municipality of Thatta was established by the British in 1854 and several vernacular and private schools, as well as a post office, a dispensary and a subordinate jail were built. The British established their residential areas away from the main city, on higher grounds, west of Makli necropolis. Thatta regained prosperity because of an improved communication infrastructure, though the city was never completely revived its prior importance as capital. The late nineteenth century saw a new class of merchants who took full advantage of the British need for services and goods. These merchants became rich and commissioned many buildings inspired by the elegant mansions constructed by the British throughout the British Empire.

Post-independence Thatta is rapidly growing and suffers from a severe lack of basic services. Heavy demands on the resources of the city, coupled with the general apathy on the part of the local administration, has resulted in the neglect of the city's historic center. The Makli monuments and other historic mosques, although of touristic value, are disregarded with nothing being done to preserve them.

== Administration ==
The district is now administratively subdivided into 4 Tehsils:

Tehsil	Area (km²)	Pop. (2023)	Density (ppl/km²) (2023)	Literacy rate (2023)
Ghorabari Tehsil	1,018	198,920	195.4	19.89%
Keti Bandar Tehsil	771	63,217	81.99	12.86%
Mirpur Sakro Tehsil	2,958	376,078	127.14	27.95%
Thatta Tehsil	3,823	444,976	116.39	30.90%

The 2015/ 2016 local bodies election was decisively won by the liberal Pakistan People's Party (PPP) and Ghulam Qadir Palijo was elected as the Chairman of the district. Palijo was earlier an elected Member of the Sindh Assembly (MPA) from Mirpur Sakro, Thatta.

== Demographics ==
Historical population
Year	Pop.	±% p.a.
1951		—
1961		—
1972		—
1981		—
1998	599,492	—
2017	982,138	+2.63%
2023	1,083,191	+1.65%

As of the 2023 census, Thatta district has 206,202 households and a population of 1,083,191. The district has a sex ratio of 105.18 males to 100 females and a literacy rate of 26.88%: 33.23% for males and 20.12% for females. 346,721 (32.01% of the surveyed population) are under 10 years of age. 193,679 (17.88%) live in urban areas.

=== Religion ===
Religions in Thatta district (2023)
Religion	Percent
Islam	96.70%
Hinduism	2.92%
Other or not stated	0.38%

Religion in contemporary Thatta district
Religious group	1941 (Note: 1941 census data is for Ghorabari, Keti Bunder, Mirpur Sakro and Thatta, which roughly corresponds to the present district.)		2017		2023	
Religious group	Pop.	%	Pop.	%	Pop.	%
Islam	111,179	89.26%	950,213	96.75%	1,047,467	96.70%
Hinduism	12,472	10.01%	29,832	3.04%	31,649	2.92%
Sikhism	878	0.70%	—N/a	—N/a	10	~0%
Christianity	12	0.01%	1,972	0.20%	2,892	0.27%
Others (Note: Including Jainism, Christianity, Buddhism, Zoroastrianism, Judaism, Ad-Dharmis, or not stated)	20	0.02%	121	0.01%	1,173	0.11%
Total Population	124,561	100%	982,138	100%	1,083,191	100%

The majority religion is Islam, with 96.7% of the population. Hinduism (including those from Scheduled Castes) is practiced by 2.92% of the population.

=== Language ===
At the time of the 2023 census, 95.01% of the population spoke Sindhi as their first language, while other languages such as Urdu and Pashto are also spoken by minority.

== Business Activity ==
Thatta Cement Company Limited (PSX: THCCL) is public limited company which is engaged in the manufacturing and marketing of cement.

Thatta Power (Private) Limited.

INNOCSR, a Korean company in sustainable construction technology, has officially inaugurated a Good brick factory in Thatta.

== List of Dehs (towns, villages) ==
The following is a list of Thatta District's dehs:

  - Jungshahi
  - Makli
  - Sheikhani
  - Thatta
  - Miyani
  - Gharo
  - Gono
  - Karampur
  - Mirpur Sakro
  - Kohistan 7/1,7/2,7/3,7/4 Half

== See also ==
- Marho Kotri Wildlife Sanctuary
- Haleji Lake
- Sri Chand Darbar

== Notes ==
=== Bibliography ===
- 1998 District census report of Thatta. Census publication. Vol. 54. Islamabad: Population Census Organization, Statistics Division, Government of Pakistan. 1999.
