= Mirpur Bathoro Tehsil =

Pakistani administrative area

- Taluka
- Location in Pakistan Mirpur Bathoro Tehsil (Pakistan)
- Coordinates: 24°43′48.0″N 68°15′0.0″E
- Country: Pakistan
- Province: Sindh
- District: Sujawal
- Taluka: Mirpur Bathoro
- Towns: 2
- Union Councils: 08

Government
  - Type: Tehsil Municipal Administration
  - Assistant Commissioner / Administrator: MR. Muhammad Ali Memon
  - Founder: Abdul Bano

Area
  - Taluka: 4 km^{2} (1.5 sq mi)
  - Metro: 2 km^{2} (0.77 sq mi)
- Elevation: 39 m (128 ft)

Population (2017)
  - Taluka: 210,959
- Time zone: UTC+5 (PST)
  - Summer (DST): UTC+6 (PDT)
- Postal code: +73030
- Area code: +298

Mirpur Bathoro Tehsil (Sindhi: ميرپور بٺورو) is an administrative subdivision (tehsil) of Sujawal District. Previously it was in Thatta District in the Sindh province of Pakistan. Its capital is the city of Thatta.

== Administration ==
Mirpur Bathoro tehsil, administratively subdivided into 8 Union Councils, is located about 55 km southwest of Tando Muhammad Khan District and 50 km northeast of Thatta.
