= Naserpur =

Nasarpur نصرپور
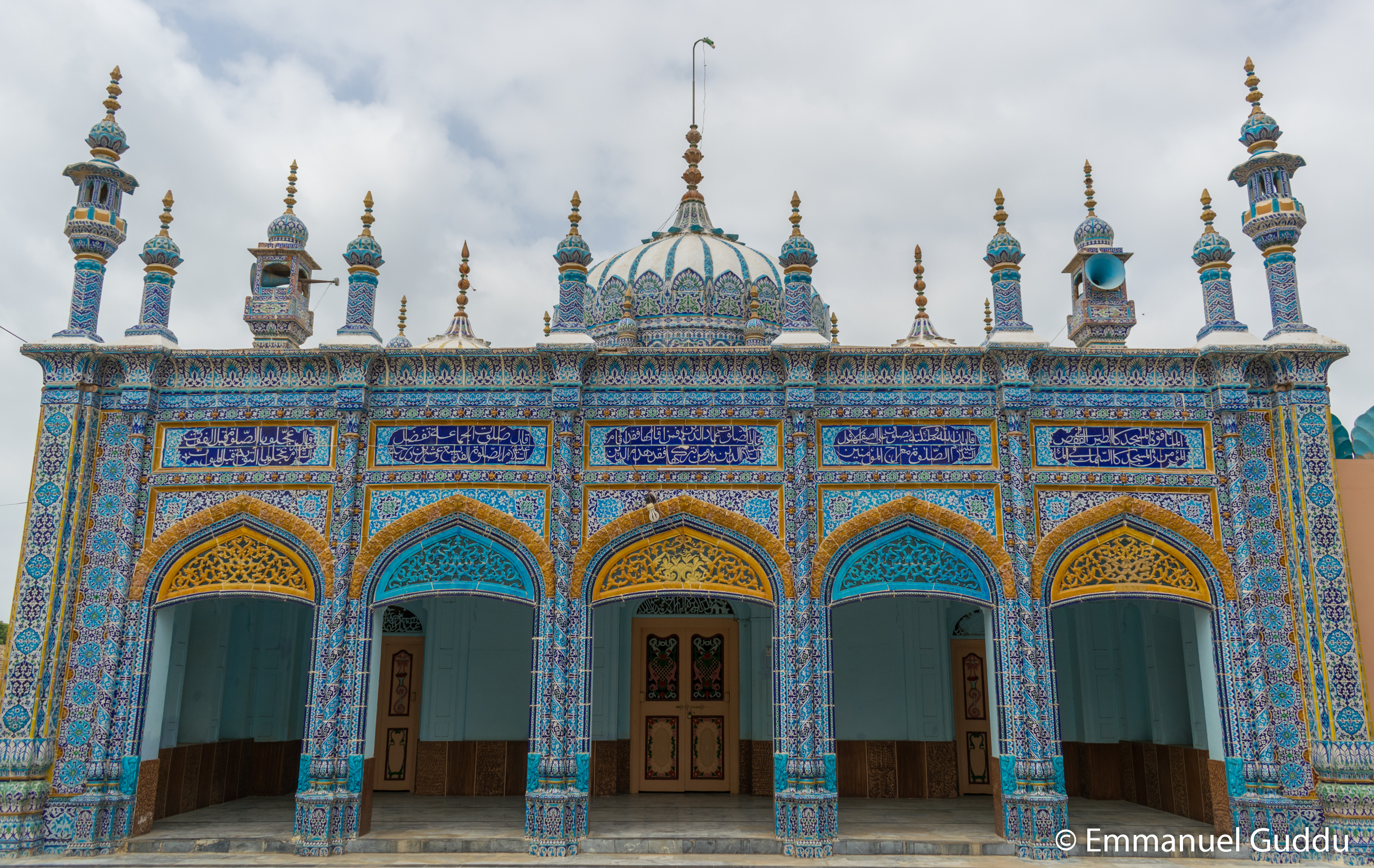
- Shrine of Pir Jurial Shah

- Location within Sindh
- Coordinates: 25.31°N 68.37°E
- Country: Pakistan
- Province: Sindh
- District: Tando Allahyar
- Tehsil: Naserpur Tehsil
- Elevation: 42 m (138 ft)

Population (2023 census)
  - Estimate: 35,397
- Time zone: UTC+5 (PST)
- Calling code: +92 22
- Number of towns: 1
- Number of Union councils: 2
- Website: http://www.nasarpur.com

Naserpur (Sindhi: نصرپور), or Nasarpur, is a small City in Sindh, Pakistan.

== Historical background ==
According to Hakeem Fateh Mohammad Sehwani (book Abo-al-fazal) Naserpur was one of the major city along with Umar Kot, Thatta and Sewistan (Sehwan). Mohammad Yousaf Shakir Abro Sindhi has described in Raisala Bursat that after establishment of Mansoora city during Arabic era gradually vanished the Berhaman Abad city and remaining Hindus has been migrated and settled in Nasarpur.

Mirza Kalich Beg has described the Naserpur history and re-establish during Soomra kingdom from 720 to 1320. Dodha khan, Mirza Shah Baig Arkhon 928, Mirza Shah Hasan Arkhon 942, MIrza Tukhan, MIrza Qasim Arkhon and Sultan Abo al Qasim ruled in this region. Ali Sher Fateh Thathwi has mentioned the appearance of Meer Naseer in 752. Unfortunately, The complete history of the Naserpur was not described or kept in any historical book. The archaeological sites, old Masjeed, Tomb, destructive Fort provides the evidence that Nasarpur is a historical city. Nasarpur is a very ancient city of Sindh, whose real name is Mata Lui. It was built in 132 AH by the governor of Sindh, Nasr bin Mohammed Bin Al-Sha'at al-Khuzai, whose mention is clearly written in Atta Muhammad Bhandro's book Sakari Sindh and Takaharu Man.

== Naserpur today ==
Naserpur is a famous city in the province of Sindh, Pakistan. Located 45 kilometres (28 mi) west of Hyderabad and 11 kilometres (6.8 mi) from Tando Allahyar, Naserpur is known for its richness in handicrafts, artisans and artifacts beside being a big centre of ceramics. Its neighbor cities are Tando Allahyar, Matiari, Pali Jani, Odero Lal, Allah Dino Sand, Tajpoor, Tando Soomro, Tando Jam, Hyderabad and Mirpurkhas. The city railway station, "Tajpur Nasarpur railway station", is at a distance of 7 kilometres (4.3 mi).

=== Shah Inayatullah Rizvi ===
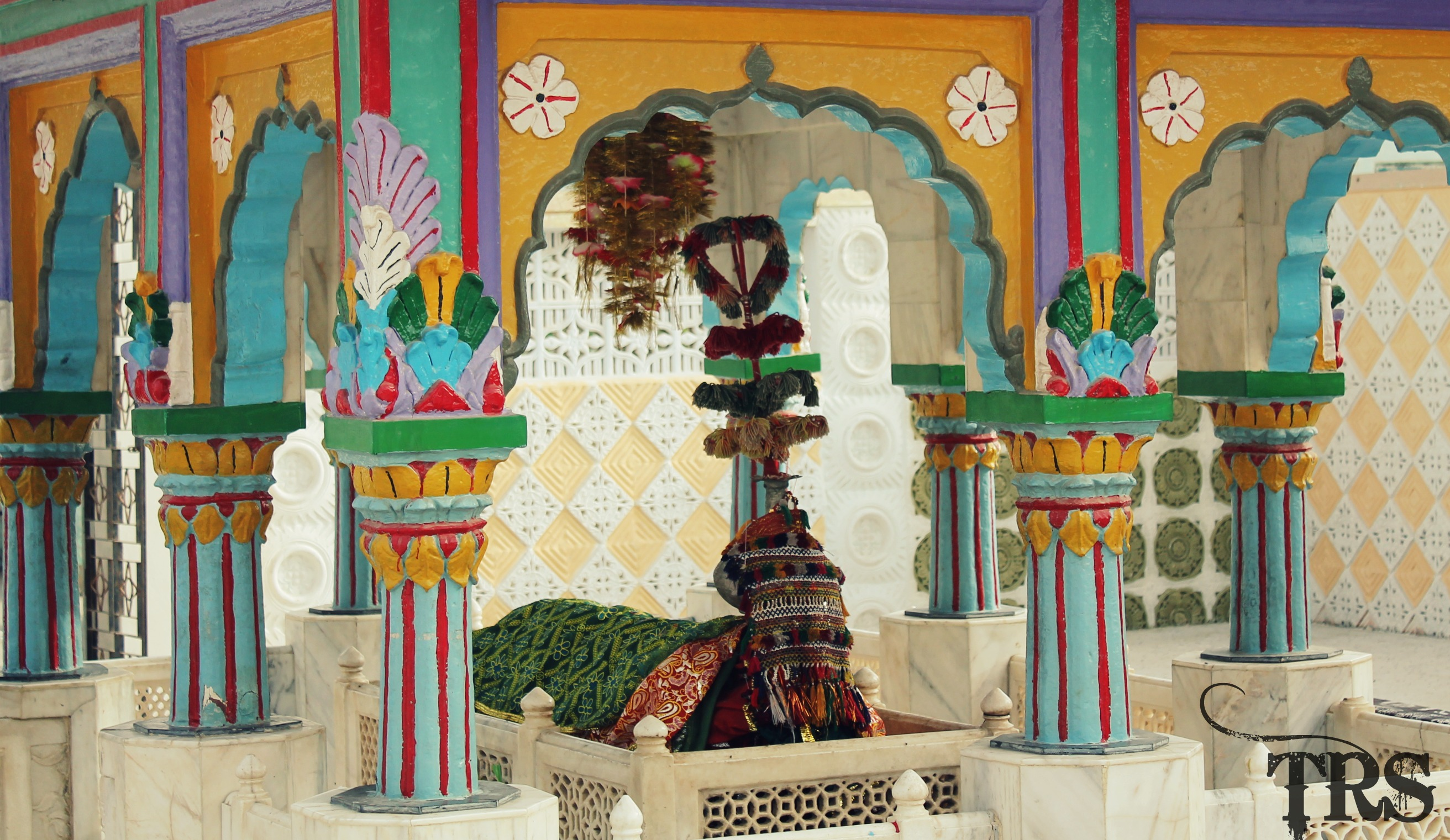
Shrine of Misri Shah

Shah Inayat, famous Sindhi Sufi also spent his life in the town of Naserpur. He was a poet of great merit in the Sindhi language. His shrine is in the town of Nasarpur. Eminent poet, Hazrat Misri Shah Imam Sindhi also come from his family.

== Demographics ==
Census	Population
1972	6,032
1981	6,774
1998	9,757
2017	34,561
2023	35,397

== See also ==
- Ramapir Temple Tando Allahyar
- Khes
