= Hobby horse (disambiguation) =

A hobby horse is a costumed character resembling a horse in various folk customs.

Hobby horse or hobbyhorse may also refer to:

== Pastimes ==
- Hobby horse (toy), a stick with an imitation horse's head, straddled by a rider to mimic riding
  - Hobby horse polo, a variant of polo played on foot using hobby horses
  - Hobby horsing, an equestrian-inspired sport using hobby horses, originating in Finland
- Dandy horse or hobby horse, an early form of bicycle

== Media ==
- The Hobby Horse, the magazine of the Century Guild of Artists from 1886 to 1892
- The Hobby Horse (film), a 1962 Australian television play
- The Hobby Horse, an 1886 stage comedy by Arthur Wing Pinero

== Other ==
- Metaphorically, an idée fixe (psychology), an obsession or passion one fixates on
- Irish Hobby, an extinct breed of horse
- A 1972 pop group including Mary Hopkin
