= Piyaro Lund =

Town Committee Piyaro Lund
- Town committee of Pakistan
- Town Committee Piyaro Lund is located in the north of the district.
- Interactive map of Town Committee Piyaro Lund
- Country: Pakistan
- Province: Sindh
- District: Tando Allahyar
- Tehsil: Jhando Mari

Government
  - Chairman: Haji Noor Muhammad Nizamani
  - VICE CHAIRMAN: JAVED JUMAN LUND BALOCH

Population
  - Total: 23,613

Piyaro Lund is a town and headquarter tahsil Jhando Mari of Tando Allahyar District in the Sindh Province of Pakistan; it has a population of 23,613. It is part of Jhando Mari Taluka and is located in the south of the district at 25°33′0″N 68°48′0″E.

== See also ==
- Ramapir Temple Tando Allahyar
