= Began Jarwar =

Coordinates: 25°25′35″N 68°50′20″E

- Union Council
- Begin Jarwar is located in the south of the district.
- Interactive map of Began Jarwar
- Country: Pakistan
- Province: Sindh
- District: Tando Allahyar
- Tehsil: Chamber

Government
  - Nazim: Mian Maroof Ali Walhari

Population
  - Total: 41,890

Began Jarwar is a large village on the Mirwah road from Tando Allahyar to Mirwah Town. It is fertile with green lands and thickly populated area. It is about two hundred years old. It is also the Headquarter of Union Council Began Jarwar since 1959. Population of Began Jarwar village is more than 3,000, and population of UC is about 20,000. The village has many basic facilities as dispensary, schools, veterinary centre for animals, agriculture office etc.

In village majority of people belongs to Jarwar community but there are also other communities such as Rind, Lohar (Samoon), Bheel, Kolhi, Sheedi, Umrani, and Shaikh. There is an OGDCL oil field. It is part of Chamber Taluka situated 25 kilometers from Chamber Town in north and 13 kilometers south of the city of Tando Allahyar. at 25°25'35N 68°50'20E.

== See also ==
- Ramapir Temple Tando Allahyar
