= Hobby horse (toy) =

Children's horse toy

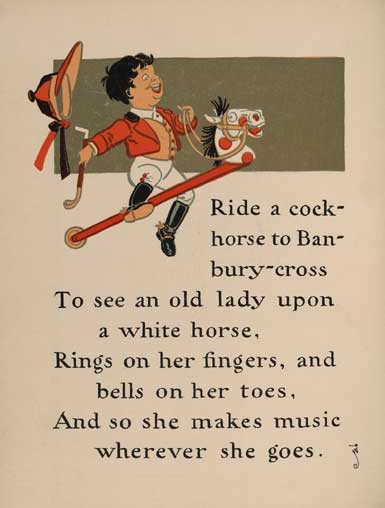
William Wallace Denslow's illustrations for a variant of Ride a cock horse to Banbury Cross, from a 1901 edition of Mother Goose.

A hobby horse (or hobby-horse) is a child's toy horse. Children play at riding a horse made of a straight stick with a head (of wood or stuffed fabric), and perhaps reins, attached to one end. The bottom end of the stick sometimes had a small wheel or wheels attached. This toy was also sometimes known as a cock horse (as in the nursery rhyme Ride a cock horse to Banbury Cross) or stick horse.

Hobby horses feature in the worship of Rajasthani folk deity Baba Ramdevji, a reference to a story about his childhood; wooden toy horses are popular offerings at his temple at Ramdevra. They also figured in the public rites of the Romanian Călușari.

Hobby horsing as a sport became popular among young women in Finland and elsewhere in the 21st century.

== Other meanings ==
A hobby horse is not always a riding-stick like the child's toy; larger hobby horses feature in some traditional seasonal customs (such as Mummers Plays and the Morris dance in England). They vary in size from a costume for one person to large frameworks carried by nine people.

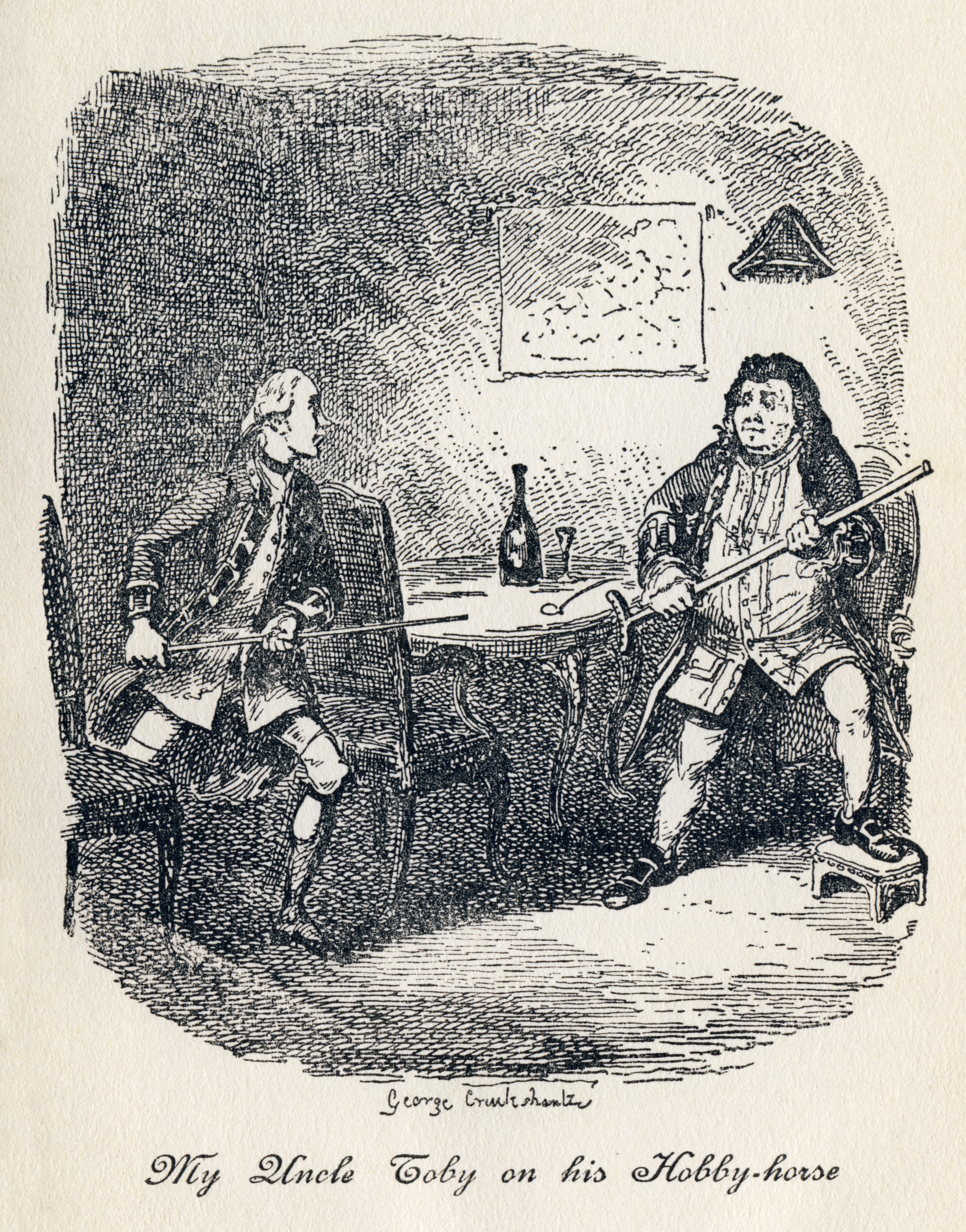
In The Life and Opinions of Tristram Shandy, Gentleman, the characters' hobby-horses, or particular obsessions, are discussed in detail. Here, Uncle Toby's obsession with the military leads him and Trim - who gets caught up in Toby's enthusiasm - to begin acting out military actions. Illustration by George Cruikshank.

From "hobby horse" (see Etymology, below) came the expression "to ride one's hobby-horse", meaning "to follow a favourite pastime", and in turn, the modern sense of the term hobby.

The term is also connected to the draisine, a forerunner of the bicycle, invented by Baron Karl von Drais. In 1818, a London coach-maker named Denis Johnson began producing an improved version, which was popularly known as the "hobby-horse".

The artistic movement Dada is possibly named after a French child's word for hobby-horse.

== Etymology ==
The word hobby is glossed by the OED as "a small or middle-sized horse; an ambling or pacing horse; a pony." The word is attested in English from the 14th century, as Middle English hobyn. Old French had hobin or haubby, whence Modern French aubin and Italian ubino. But the Old French term is apparently adopted from English rather than vice versa. OED connects it to "the by-name Hobin, Hobby", a variant of Robin" (compare the abbreviation Hob for Robert). This appears to have been a name customarily given to a cart-horse, as attested by White Kennett in his Parochial Antiquities (1695), who stated that "Our ploughmen to some one of their cart-horses generally give the name of Hobin, the very word which Phil. Comines uses, Hist. VI. vii." Another familiar form of the same Christian name, Dobbin has also become a generic name for a cart-horse.

Samuel Johnson, Dictionary of the English Language, 1755, glosses "A strong, active horse, of a middle size, said to have been originally from Ireland; an ambling nag."

== Further use ==
Hobblers or hovellers were men who kept a light horse so that they may give swift warning of threatened invasion. (Old French, hober, to move up and down; our hobby, q.v.) In medieval times their duties were to reconnoiter, to carry intelligence, to harass stragglers, to act as spies, to intercept convoys, and to pursue fugitives. Henry Spelman (d. 1641) derived the word from "hobby".

Hobblers were another description of cavalry more lightly armed, and taken from the class of men rated at 15 pounds and upwards.

— John Lingard, The History of England, (1819), vol. iv. chap. ii. p. 116.

Border horses, called hobblers or hobbies, were small and active and trained to cross the most difficult and boggy country "and to get over where our footmen could scarce dare to follow." - George MacDonald Fraser, The Steel Bonnets, The Story of the Anglo-Scottish Border Reivers.

Hobby horse polo partly uses polo rules but has its own specialities, e.g. 'punitive sherries', and uses hobby horses instead of ponies. The hobby horse variant of polo started in 1998 as a fun sport in south western Germany and led in 2002 to the foundation of the First Kurfürstlich-Kurpfälzisch Polo-Club in Mannheim. It has since gained further interest in other German cities.

In the 21st century Hobby horsing became a popular sport among young women in Finland and spread to other countries.

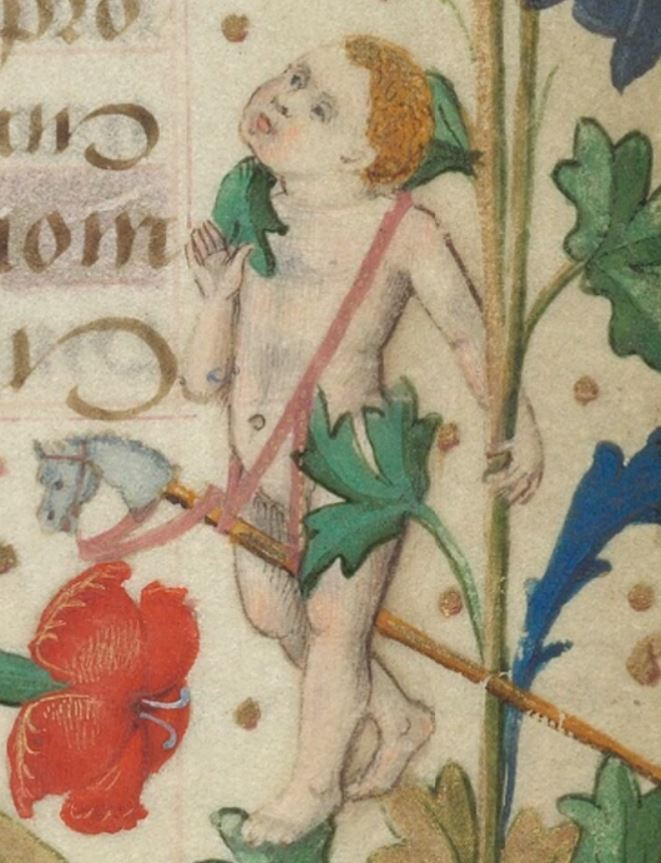
A stick horse in the parisian manuscript Horae ad usum Parisiense, circa 1480.

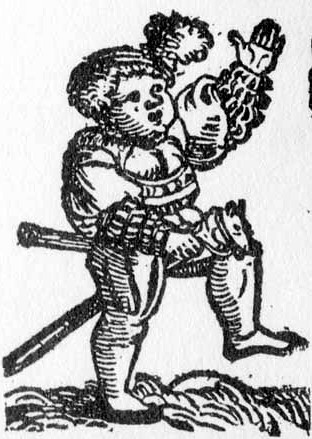
Woodcut illustration from Dryander, Der Arzney gemeiner Inhalt, 1542

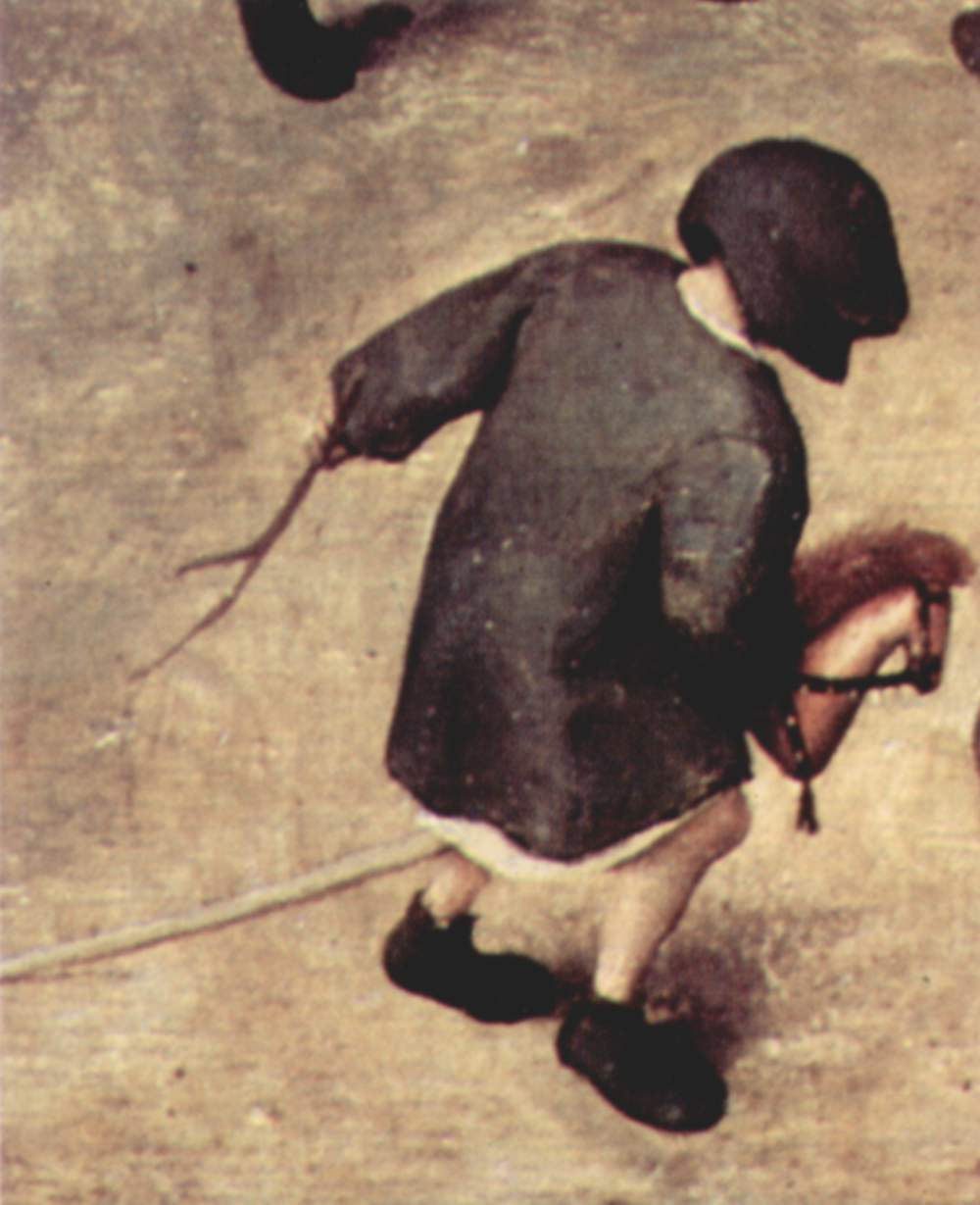
Detail from Children's Games by Pieter Bruegel the Elder, 1560

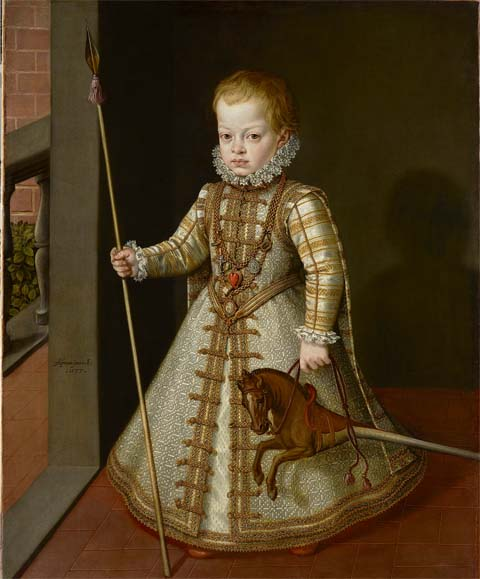
Portrait of the Infant Don Diego by Coello, 1577

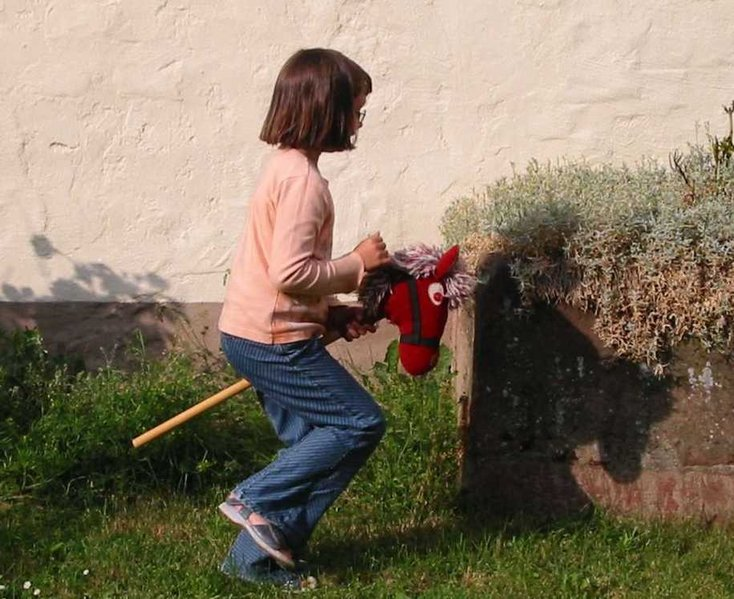
Child with a hobby horse

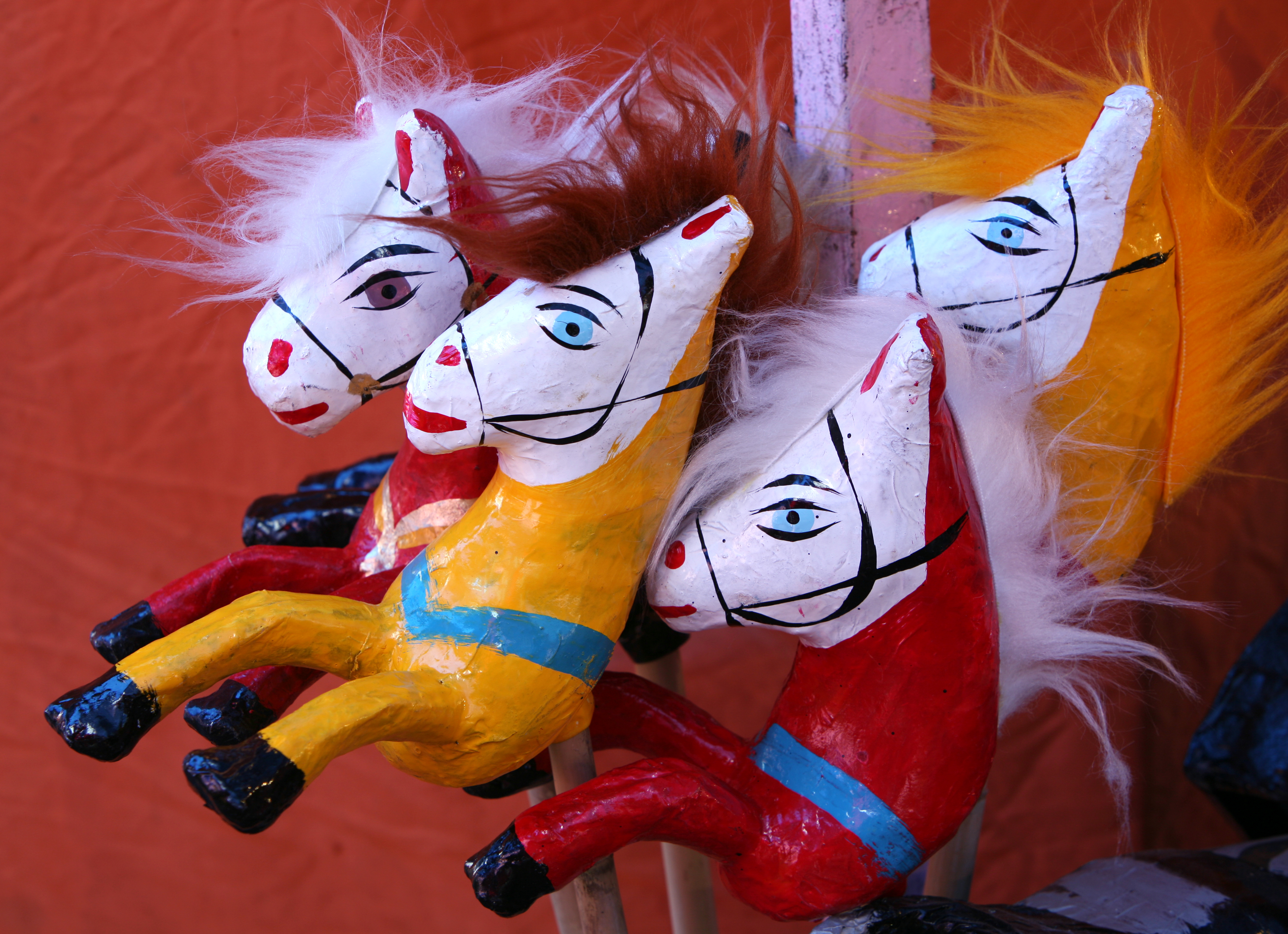
Mexican papier-mâché hobby horses

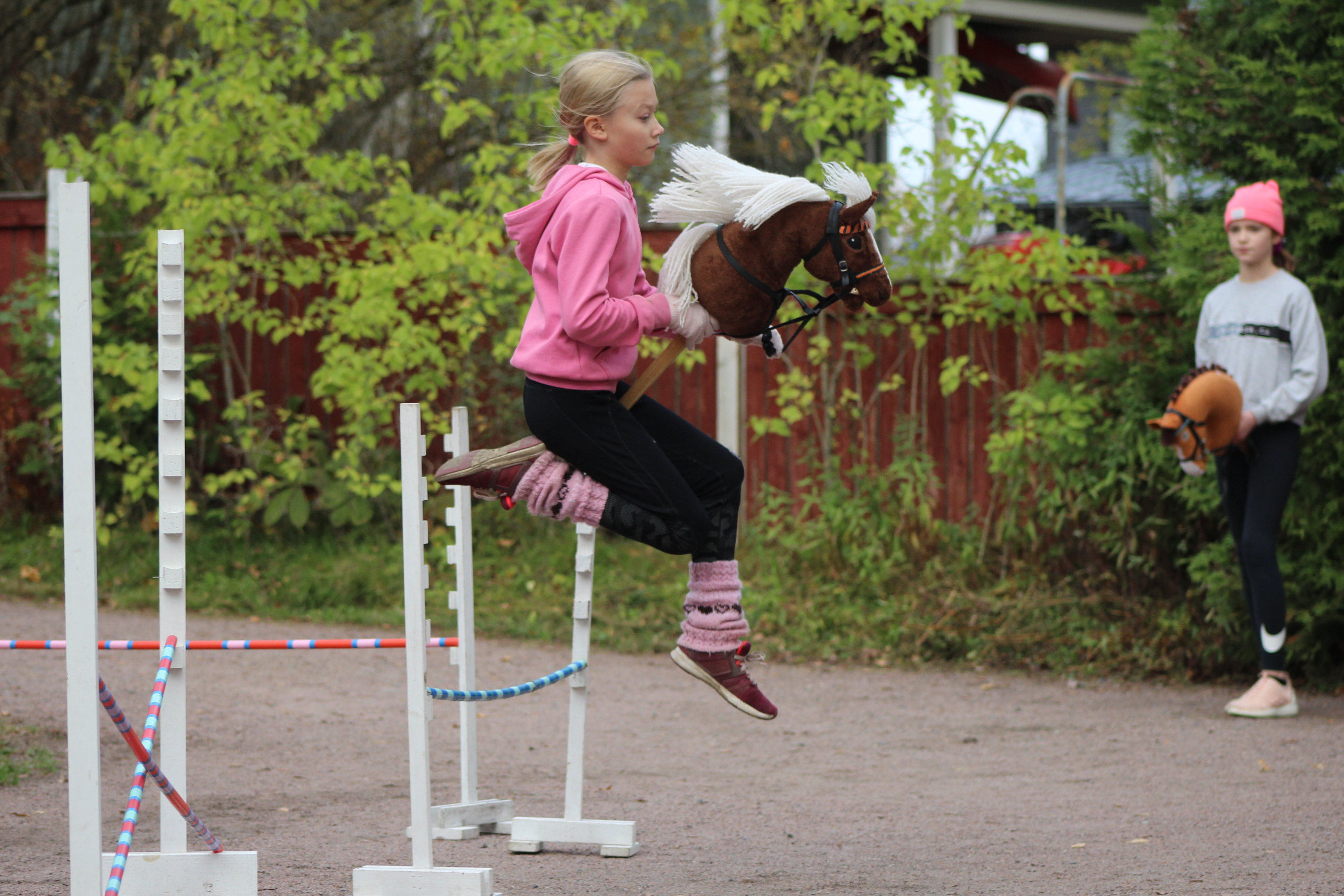
A hobby horse rider jumping

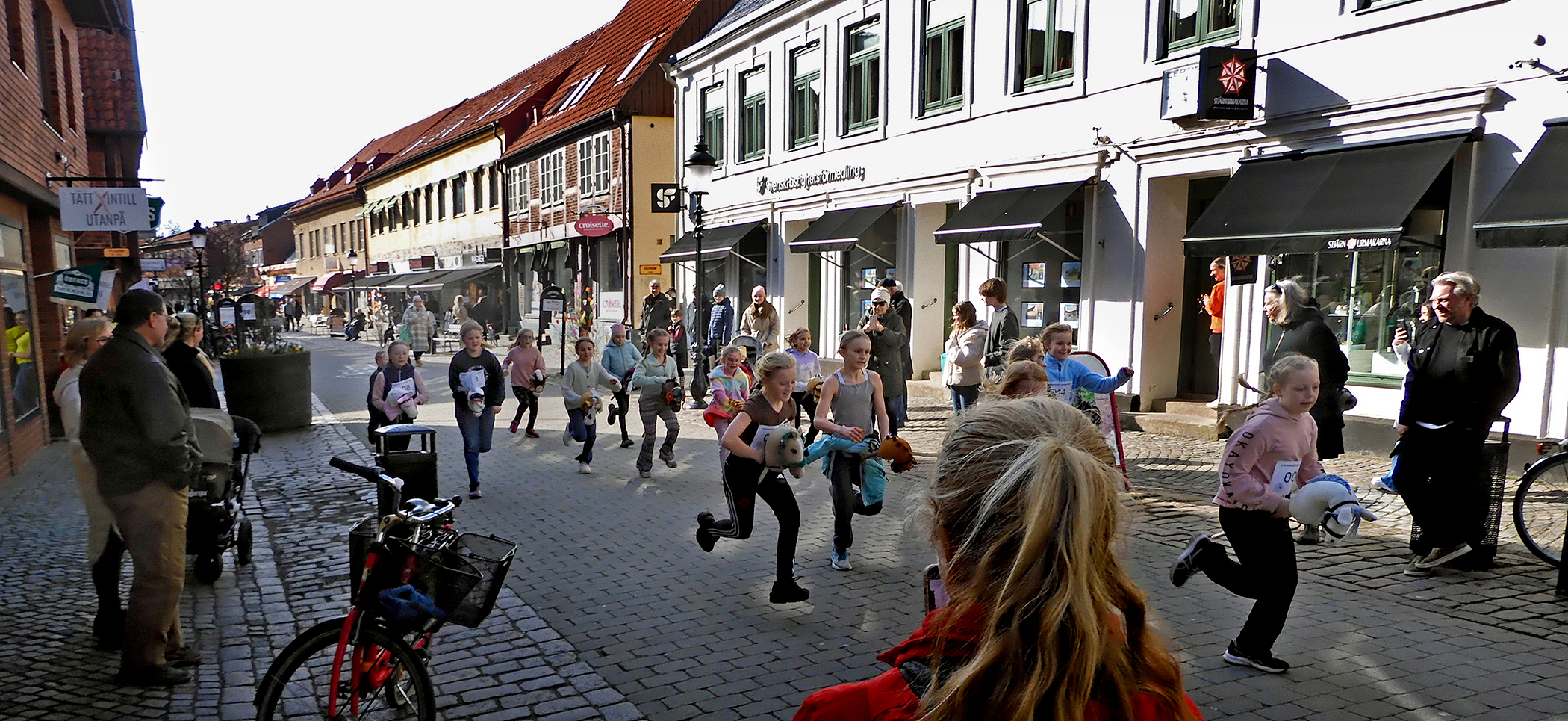
A race with hobby horses in central Ystad in 2024.

== See also ==
- Dandy horse
- 'Obby 'Oss festival
