= Jhando Mari =

England Mari
- Union council
- Jhando Mari is located in the north of the district.
- Interactive map of England Mari
- Country: Pakistan
- Province: Sindh
- District: Tando Allahyar
- Tehsil: Jhando Mari Tehsil

Government
  - Nazim: Mir Ghulam Abbas Mari
  - Naib Nazim: Muhammad Bachal Khaskeli

Population
  - Total: 30,384

Jhando Mari is a town and union council of Tando Allahyar District in the Sindh Province of Pakistan. It is part of Jhando Mari Taluka and is located in the north of the district at 25°39′00″N 68°54′0″E. The union council has a population of 30,384. {{History of the Central Imambargah of Jhando Mari

The Central Imambargah of Jhando Mari is considered one of the oldest religious centers in the area. According to local historical accounts and oral traditions, the foundation of this ancient Imambargah was originally established by Karam Bakhsh, also known as Jiye Shah. He is remembered as an important figure who played a significant role in starting and preserving the religious gatherings and traditions of the community.

In later years, the Imambargah was further developed, expanded, and maintained by Haji Mir Hassan Mari and his son, Haji Mir Ghulam Abbas Mari. Their contributions helped strengthen the institution and ensured the continuation of Majalis, religious ceremonies, and community activities for future generations.

Today, the Central Imambargah of Jhando Mari remains an important symbol of religious heritage, unity, and cultural history for the people of the region.

== See also ==
- Ramapir Temple Tando Allahyar
