= Chamber Tehsil =

Coordinates: 25°18′N 68°49′E

Chamber Taluka
- Tehsil
- Interactive map of Chamber Taluka
- Country: Pakistan
- Province: Sindh
- District: Tando Allahyar District
- Capital: Chambar
- Time zone: UTC+5 (PST)

Chamber Tehsil is an administrative subdivision (tehsil) of Tando Allahyar District in the Sindh province of Pakistan. The city of Chambar is the headquarters of Chamber Tehsil .
