= Bukera Sharif =

Coordinates: 25°23′15″N 68°40′37″E

- Union Council
- Interactive map of Bukera Sharif
- Country: Pakistan
- Province: Sindh
- District: Tando Allahyar
- Tehsil: Tando Allahyar

Government
  - Nazim: Pitafi
  - Naib Nazim: ABDUL SATTAR DARS

Population
  - Total: 37,008

Bukera Sharif is a town and union council of Tando Allahyar District in the Sindh Province of Pakistan. It is part of Tando Allahyar Taluka located in the south-west of the district.

== See also ==
- Ramapir Temple Tando Allahyar
