= Dad Khan Jarwar =

- Union Council
- Dad Khan Jarwar is located in the south of the district.
- Interactive map of Dad Khan Jarwar
- Coordinates: 25°19′5″N 68°43′20″E
- Country: Pakistan
- Province: Sindh
- District: Tando Allahyar
- Tehsil: Chamber

Government
  - Nazim: Haji Nabi Bux
  - Naib Nazim: Abdul Sattar

Population
  - Total: 65,295

Dad Khan Jarwar is a town and union council of Tando Allahyar District in the Sindh Province of Pakistan. It has a population of 65,295 and is part of Chamber Taluka located in the south of the district. It is one of the District's largest Union Councils.

== Water ==
The union council is located at the tail of water distributary minors like Zanur and Miran khori. Moreover, poor provincial administration limit water resources for the common people. Potable water is rarely available from water supply scheme or water treatment plants and well water is non-potable.

== Education ==
The education system is well developed with separate primary and elementary schools for boys and girls, but limited staff. Students have to travel to a nearby city or town schools. The literacy ratio is about 50% with little improvement.

== Health ==
The health system is good but needs progress.

== Administration ==
Nabi Bux Lund is Nazim of the union council.

== See also ==
- Ramapir Temple Tando Allahyar
