= Dasori =

- Union Council
- Dasori is located in the north of district.
- Interactive map of Dasori
- Coordinates: 25°35′21″N 68°44′56″E
- Country: Pakistan
- Province: Sindh
- District: Tando Allahyar
- Tehsil: Jhando Mari

Government
  - Nazim: ROSHAN DIN THEBO
  - Naib Nazim: MUHAMMAD SALEH MIRJAT

Population
  - Total: 49,427

Dasori is a town and union council of Tando Allahyar District in the Sindh Province of Pakistan. It has a population of 49,427 and is part of Jhando Mari Taluka.
