= Bhinyad, Barmer =

Bhinyad
- village
- Bhiyad (भियाड़)
- Location in Rajasthan, India Bhinyad (India)
- Coordinates: 26°20′N 71°28′E
- Country: India
- State: Rajasthan
- District: Barmer

Area
  - Total: 2,421 ha (5,980 acres)

Population (2011)
  - Total: 2,097
  - Density: 86.62/km^{2} (224.3/sq mi)

Languages
  - Official: Hindi Rajasthani
- Time zone: UTC+5:30 (IST)
- PIN: 344701
- Telephone code: 02987
- ISO 3166 code: RJ-IN
- Vehicle registration: RJ-04
- Nearest city: Barmer, Jaisalmer and Jodhpur
- Literacy: 85%
- Lok Sabha constituency: Barmer
- Vidhan Sabha constituency: Sheo
- Website: mybhinyad.com

Bhinyad is a village located 82 km north of Barmer, Rajasthan, India, on the Ramdevara road. It has ten wards and boasts a population of 2,097 according to Census 2011.
