= Missan =

Missan may refer to:

- Maysan Governorate, Iraq
- Missan, Sindh, Pakistan
- Missan Oil Company, a state-owned oil and gas company in the Maysan Governorate, Iraq
