= Pak Singhar =

Coordinates: 25.4333°N 68.8000°E

- Union council
- Pak Singhar is located in the south of the district.
- Interactive map of Pak Singhar
- Country: Pakistan
- Province: Sindh
- District: Tando Allahyar
- Tehsil: Tando Allahyar

Government
  - Naib Nazim: DR ALI NAWAZ CHOHAN

Population
  - Total: 43,473

Pak Singhar is a town and union council of Tando Allahyar District in the Sindh Province of Pakistan. It is part of Tando Allahyar Taluka and is located to the south-east of the capital. The Union Council has a population of 43,473.

== See also ==
- Ramapir Temple Tando Allahyar
