= Shaikh Moosa =

Coordinates: 25.4500°N 68.7167°E

- Union council
- Shaikh Moosa is located in the centre of the district.
- Interactive map of Shaikh Moosa
- Country: Pakistan
- Province: Sindh
- District: Tando Allahyar
- Tehsil: Tando Allahyar

Government
  - Nazim: ASIF ANWAR KHAWAJA
  - Naib Nazim: DR. AKBAR ALI LUND

Population
  - Total: 65,776

Shaikh Moosa is a town and union council of Tando Allahyar District in the Sindh Province of Pakistan. It is part of Tando Allahyar Taluka and is located in the centre of the district, the Union Council has a population of 65,776.

== See also ==
- Ramapir Temple Tando Allahyar
