= Tando Soomro =

Local government council in Sindh, Pakistan

Coordinates: 25.4500°N 68.7167°E

- Union council
- Tando Soomro is located in the north-west of the district.
- Interactive map of Tando Soomro
- Country: Pakistan
- Province: Sindh
- District: Tando Allahyar
- Tehsil: Jhando Mari

Government
  - Naib Nazim

Population
  - Total: 112,335

Tando Soomro is a village and union council of Tando Allahyar District in the Sindh province of Pakistan. Tando Soomro lies 7 km to the north-west of the district capital - Tando Allahyar at 25°31'60N 68°40'60E.

== History ==
Initially the village was known as 'village of Nizamanis' but when Rais Soomer Khan became the chieftain of this village, the village took the name of Tando Soomro (Soomer's Town). The word "soomro" in Tando Soomro can be misleading, as one can infer that it stands for Soomro, a well known surname in Sindh. However, this interpretation is wrong; the word is derived from 'Soomer Khan' and ironically there is not even a single home of any Soomro's in Tando Soomro. The unprecedented torrential rains of 2011 had affected entire Sindh province, including Tando Soomro. But unlike other parts of the province the villagers did not wait for any external support or help. A meeting was called at and the whole Nizamani community pooled the required amount of twenty five hundred thousand rupees to drain out rain water from the village, immediate sanitation, provision of food, medicine and clothing etc.

The village has played a role in shaping the history of Sindh. Historical records show that in the 17th century, Tando Soomro existed as a main village of the area. According to some records, by 1911, the population of Tando Allahyar was 3000 and Tando Soomro had a population of 700.

== Economy ==
Administrative subdivisions of Tando Soomaro, the names of the neighbouring Union Councils are also shown.

Tando Soomro's economy is based on agriculture, with most people involved either directly or indirectly. Tando Soomro has fertile soil and an abundance of water, so every crop yields great. Tando Soomro is situated in a lush green area with mangoes and banana orchards. Bananas and mangoes of Tando Soomro are exported to Iran, Afghanistan, Middle East, Europe and North America. Naseer Canal is lifeline of economy and flows about four furlongs away from Tando Soomro. The banks of the canal are regularly checked and strengthened on a daily basis to ensure the security of the village.

Tando Soomro has four bazaars with many shops with teeming buyers, especially after sunset when journeymen return from their work. Along with other interior Sindh, Tando Soomro has also a strong culture of 'tea houses'. 'Tea houses' not only cater for the need of tea & snacks but they are main hub of get-together and entertainment as well. Tando Soomro also has two playgrounds: one for kids and other for adults. Cricket and football (soccer) are played in certain periods of year on those grounds.

== Tando Soomro Wall ==
Due to the serious threats by organized criminal groups, the security of the village has been beefed up. A tall and robust wall has been erected around the village to ensure the security. The surveillance is twenty four hours and all days of week. The expenses of these measures were entirely borne by the Nizamani community of the village in the beginning but other communities also do contribute now according to their income.

== Demography ==
Tando Soomro union council is a cocktail of different communities or 'Zaats'. There are communities in Tando Soomro:, Khaskhalis. There are also Maachhis, Bhayas, Narayjaas, Gurati Hindus, Dayaas, Syeds or Shah, Mirzas, Manganhars, Menghwaars, Koriyaa & Pashtuns, Wadhaas, Shiekh or Khatis, Shoraas, Brohis, Pakhiara or Kihaas and Aqlani, Chachar, Sand, Keerio, Dero. The number of non-Muslims is 3000 or 32% of the population which is significantly higher than the national average of 4%.

== See also ==
- Ramapir Temple Tando Allahyar
