= DIH =

DIH or Dih may refer to:

- Dih (archaeology), historical and archaeology mounds or elevated sites in the Mithila region of the Indian subcontinent
- Defense Intelligence Headquarters, the official signals intelligence agency of the Japanese government
- Diamond Hill station (station code DIH), a Hong Kong MTR railway station
- Dih, Raebareli, a village in Uttar Pradesh, India
- Dih, Turkey, the Kurdish name for the city of Eruh
- Dihedral group (dih)
- Kumeyaay language (ISO 639 code: dih)
- Digital intangible heritage
- Heimwehfluhbahn (German: Drahtseilbahn Interlaken–Heimwehfluh), a funicular railway in Switzerland
- Dih, a slang term for penis

== See also ==
- Deh (disambiguation)
