= Mirabad, Pakistan =

Coordinates: 25.4500°N 68.7167°E

Mirabad
- Union council
- Mirabad is located in the north-east of district.
- Interactive map of Mirabad
- Country: Pakistan
- Province: Sindh
- District: Tando Allahyar
- Tehsil: Jhando Mari

Government
  - Nazim: Mir Suhail Talpur
  - Naib Nazim: Mushtaq kk

Population
  - Total: 57,361
- Website: GD New Mirabad

Mirabad is a town and union council of Tando Allahyar District in the Sindh Province of Pakistan. It has a population of 57,361, and is located in the north-east of the district where it forms part of Jhando Mari Taluka.
