= Chambar =

Chamber
- Town
- Location within Sindh
- Coordinates: 25.18°N 68.49°E
- Country: Pakistan
- Province: Sindh
- District: Tando Allahyar
- Elevation: 11 m (36 ft)

Population (2023)
  - Total: 20,037
- Time zone: UTC+5 (PST)

Chambar, or Chamber, is a town of Tando Allahyar District in the Sindh province of Pakistan. It is headquarters of Chamber Taluka (an administrative subdivision of the district). The town itself is administratively subdivided into two union councils. It is located at 25°18'0N 68°49'0E with an altitude of 11 metres (36 ft).

== Etymology ==
The word Chambar is derived from the Sindhi language; it means "to cling to someone". Chambar is also the Sindhi caste which live in the Sindh province of Pakistan.

== Climate ==
Geographically, the climate of Chambar is warm in the winter as well as in summer.

== Industry ==
The industrial factor which affect the industrial condition of Chambar is the production of sugar from Chamber Sugar Mill Pvt Ltd.

== Revenue collection ==
The strongest source of revenue collection from the city of Chambar is the Maalpirri; and T.M.O collects revenues from the Maalpirri as well as the fruit and vegetable selling carts which runs on the road. The Chairman of T.C of city Chamber (2018) is Mr. Jabram Amin Hyderi.

== Population ==
The total population of Chambar is more than 20000.

Census	Population
1998	10,687
2017	17,802
2023	20,037

== Ethnicity ==
There are many castes living in the city chambar including, Muhajir (Basically originated from India and caste may be divided in and as, Rao, Rana, Qureshi, Siddiqui, Fateh Puri) these are among the major inhabitants in the city, Furthermore, Kumbhar, Memon, Laghari, Khatti, Punjabi, Brohi, Samoo, Pathan, Noondani, Hindus which are basically Maheshwaris and Lohanas. Maheshwaris includes Rathi, Dewani.

== Religion ==
Most of the population of Chambar belongs to religion Islam and minority of the population belongs to Hinduism and Christianity.

== Transportation ==
There is not any airport or railway station system in the city. There is only one route by road which is known as Chamber Road; it connects Tando Allahyar with Badin and many other cities of Sindh.
