= Hobby horsing =

Sport using stick horses

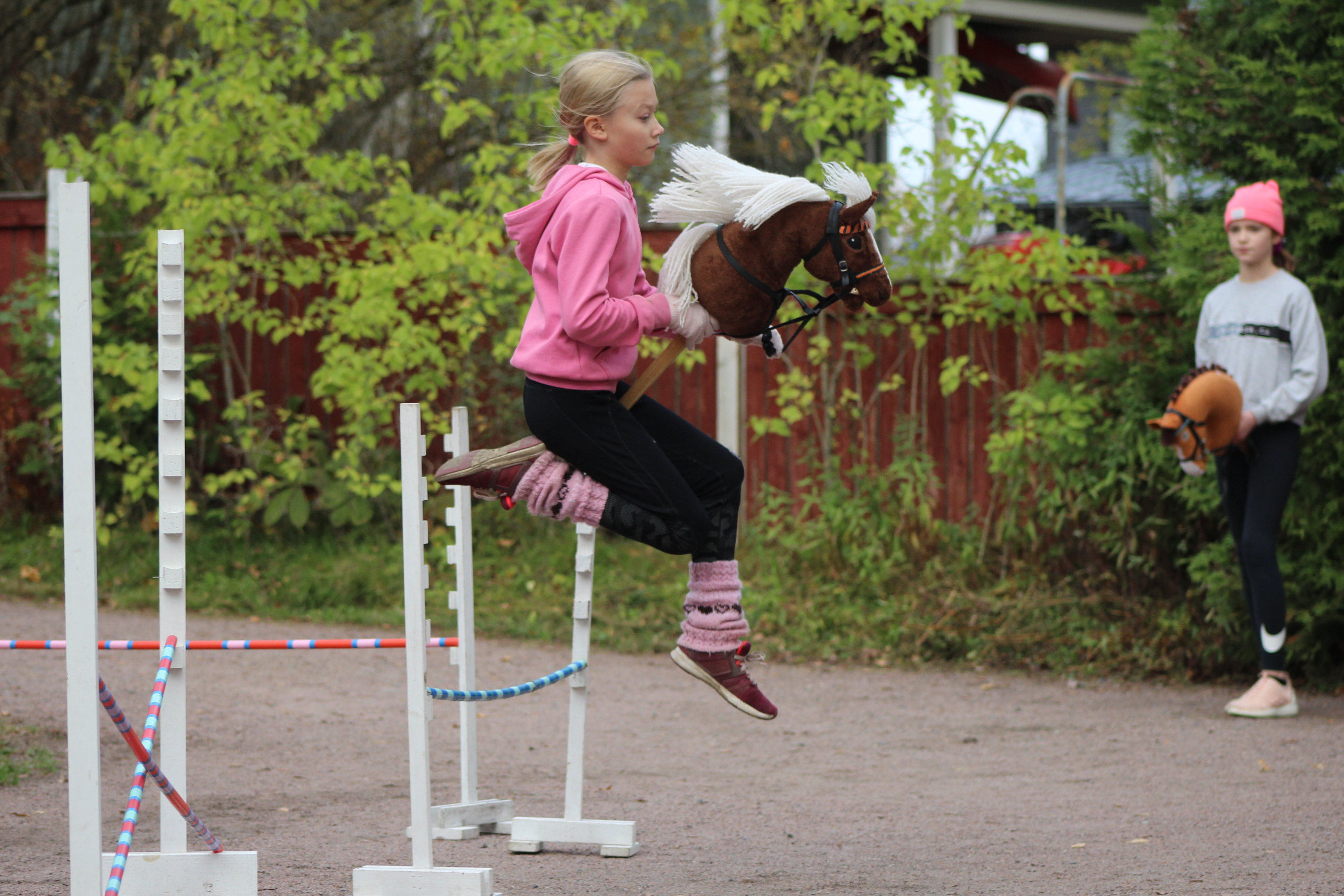
- A hobby horse rider jumping

Characteristics
- Mixed-sex: Yes
- Type: Sport
- Equipment: Hobby horse

Presence
- Country or region: Originated in Finland

Hobby horsing is a sport with gymnastic elements which uses hobby horses, also known as stick horses. Movement sequences similar to those in show jumping or dressage are partly simulated in courses, without real horses being used. The participants predominantly use self-made hobby horses.

== Origin and popularization ==
The sport was introduced to a wider public through Selma Vilhunen's 2017 film Keppihevosten vallankumous (Hobbyhorse Revolution), which won two awards at the 2017 Tampere Film Festival.

In Finland, the country of origin of the hobby, an annual national championship is held in addition to regional competitions. This hobby, which can be classified as a fun, active and trendy hobby, is particularly popular with girls and young women between the ages of 12 and 18 years and is gaining popularity beyond the other Nordic countries in other parts of Europe. The hobby had spread to Australia by 2016, and the first Australian national championship was held in Queensland in 2024. The European championships of hobby horsing will be hosted for the first time ever in 2026 in the Czech Republic. It will be hosted by the IHHF (International Hobbyhorse Federation).

== Reception ==
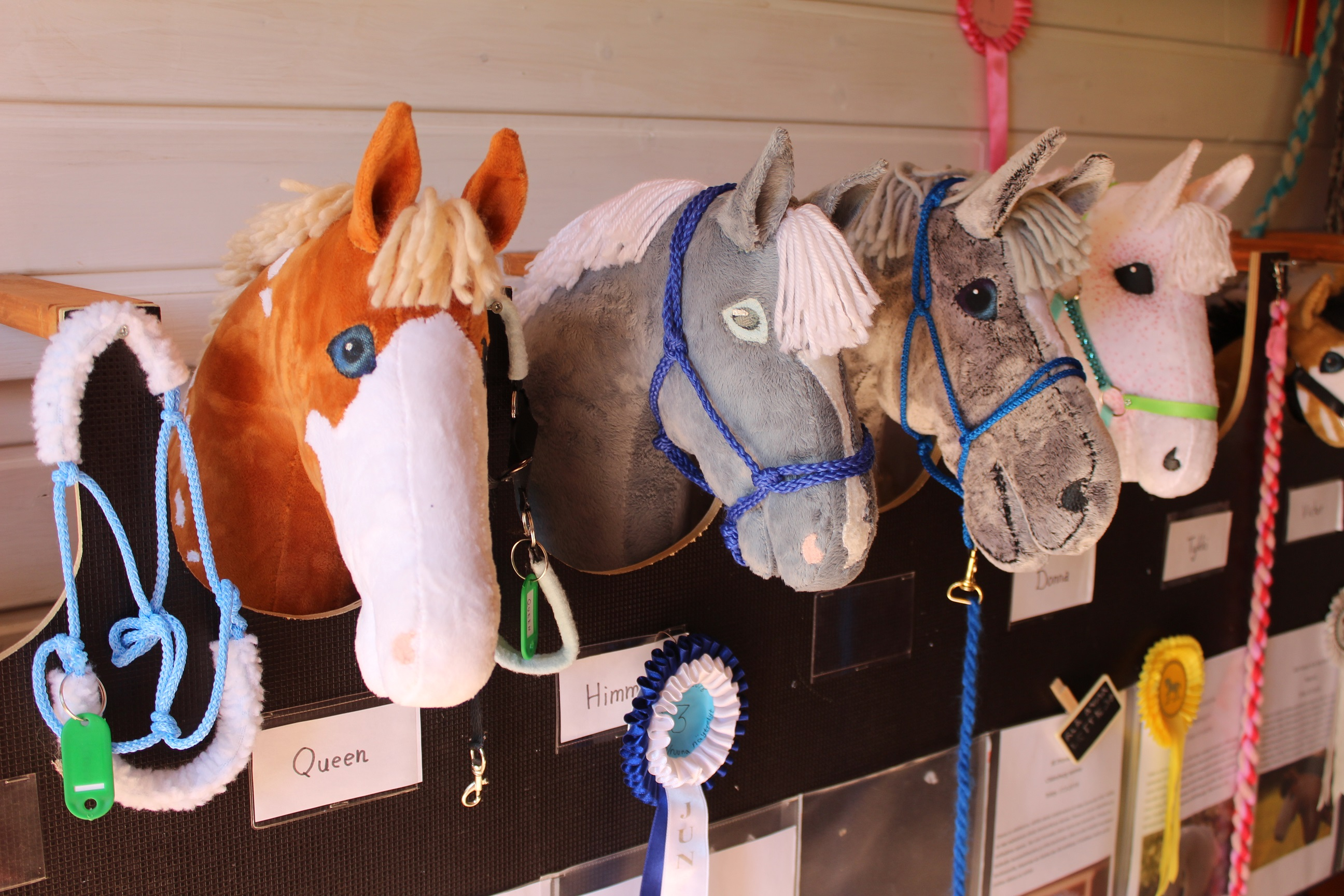
Stick horse stable

While the sport may be perceived more as a childish pastime by "real riders," Fred Sundwall, secretary general of the Finnish Equestrian Federation, views it positively: "We think it's just wonderful that hobby horsing has become a phenomenon and so popular." "It gives kids and teenagers who don't have horses a chance to interact with them outside of stables and riding schools."

A 2022 article in the British equestrian magazine Horse & Hound said that in the UK hobby horsing takes place occasionally as a novelty charity fundraising or Pony Club event but that "hobbyhorse competitions are probably more likely to be seen as a bit of fun at a school sports day than as a serious competition".

== Competitions ==
Hobby horse competitions take place either indoor within a gymnasium, outside, or even both

Hobby horse competitions have multiple disciplines in hobby horse form instead of real horses. They include dressage, show jumping, western trail, barrel racing, Hunter/Jumper, and puissance. The disciplines in competitions are commonly judged by how well it was executed (example: overall performance, knocks a jump, falls down, jumps incorrectly, etc)

USHHC is not the only group that sets up competitions, but is the largest organisation.
