= Tando Allahyar District =

Coordinates: 25°27′36″N 68°43′12″E

Tando Allahyar District: ٽنڊوالهيار ضلعو; ضلع ٹنڈو الہ یار
- District of Sindh
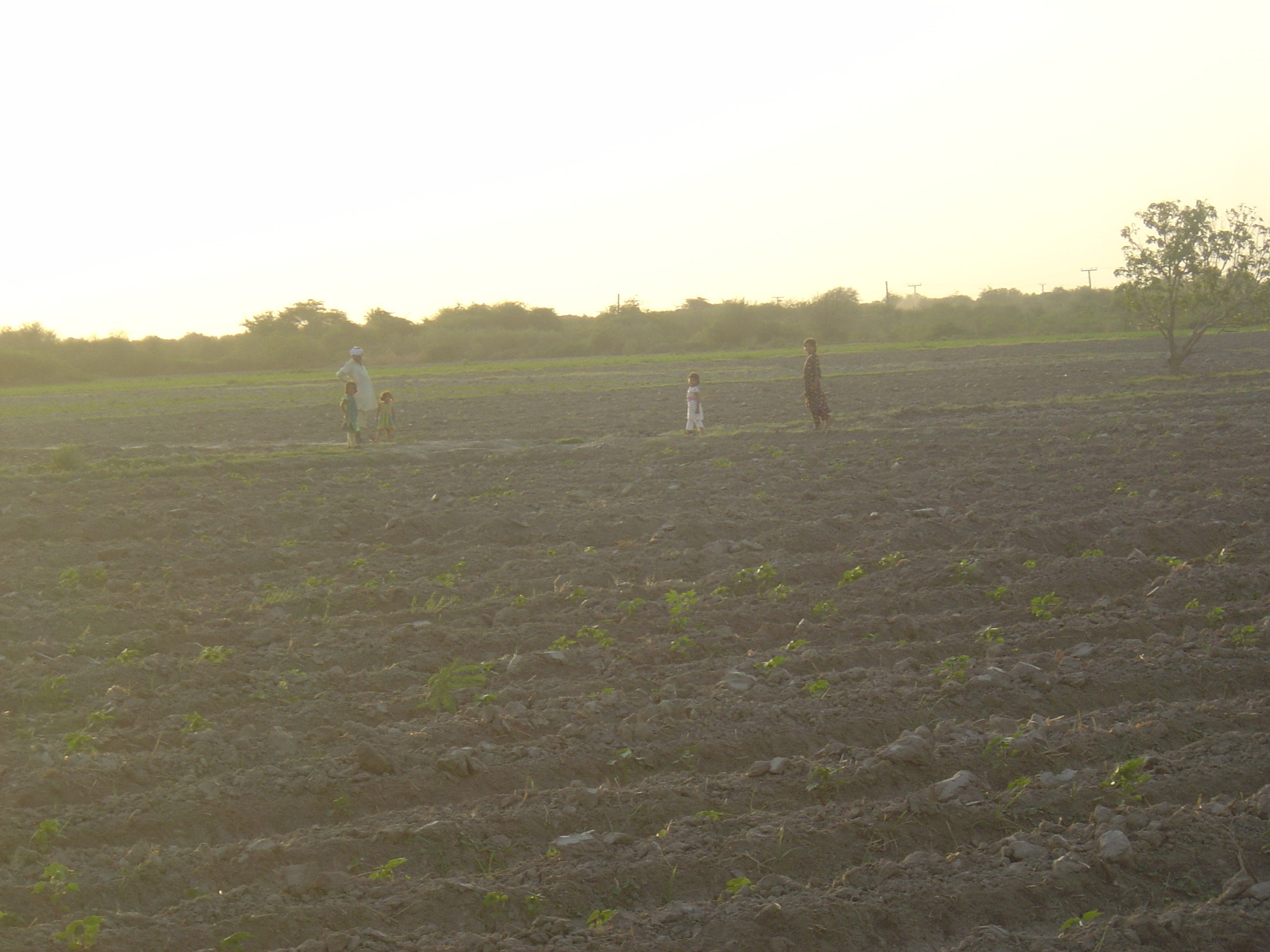
- Field in Tando Allahyar district

- Map of Sindh with Tando Allahyar District highlighted
- Country: Pakistan
- Province: Sindh
- Division: Hyderabad
- Established: 5 May 2005; 21 years ago
- Founder: Arbab Ghulam Rahim
- Headquarters: Tando Allahyar
- Administrative Towns: 03: Chamber Taluka Jhando Mari Taluka Tando Allahyar Taluka

Government
  - Type: District Administration
  - Deputy Commissioner: Saleem Ullah Odho
  - Constituensy: NA-217 Tando Allahyar

Area
  - District of Sindh: 1,554 km^{2} (600 sq mi)
- Elevation: 21 m (69 ft)

Population (2023)
  - District of Sindh: 922,012
  - Density: 593.3/km^{2} (1,537/sq mi)
  - Urban: 285,687
  - Rural: 636,325

Literacy
  - Literacy rate: Total: 39.80%; Male: 47.82%; Female: 31.48%
- Time zone: UTC+05:00 (PKT)
  - Summer (DST): DST is not observed
- ZIP Code: 70010
- NWD (area) code: 02232
- ISO 3166 code: PK-SD
- Website: Tando Allahyar Official webpage

Tando Allahyar District (Sindhi: ٽنڊوالهيار ضلعو, Urdu: ضلع ٹنڈو الہ یار) is a district of Hyderabad Division in the province of Sindh in Pakistan. Prior to becoming a separate district, it was part of Hyderabad District until 5 May 2005. According to 2023 Pakistani census, the population of Tando Allahyar district is 922,012 (0.92 million).

== History ==
The Soomra dynasty ruled the region till 712 A.D, when it was invaded by of Muhammad Bin Qasim. Later the region came under the Kalhoro dynasty, from 1717 to 1783. During the Kalharo rule, the Dals tribe were ruling the region and was known as Kundhi-Jiwasi. In 1783 A.D, the Talpur dynasty defeated the Kalhoras. Under the Talpur rule, Sindh region was divided into seven parts and the Kundhi Jiwasi was given to Mir Fateh Ali Khan Talpur to rule. Following his death, his son Mir Allahyar Khan became the ruler. There after the city was called Tando Allahyar. The British conquered the Sindh in 1843. When Pakistan was created in 1947, Tando Allahyar became a taluka of Hyderabad district until 2005. After which it became an independent district.

== Administration ==
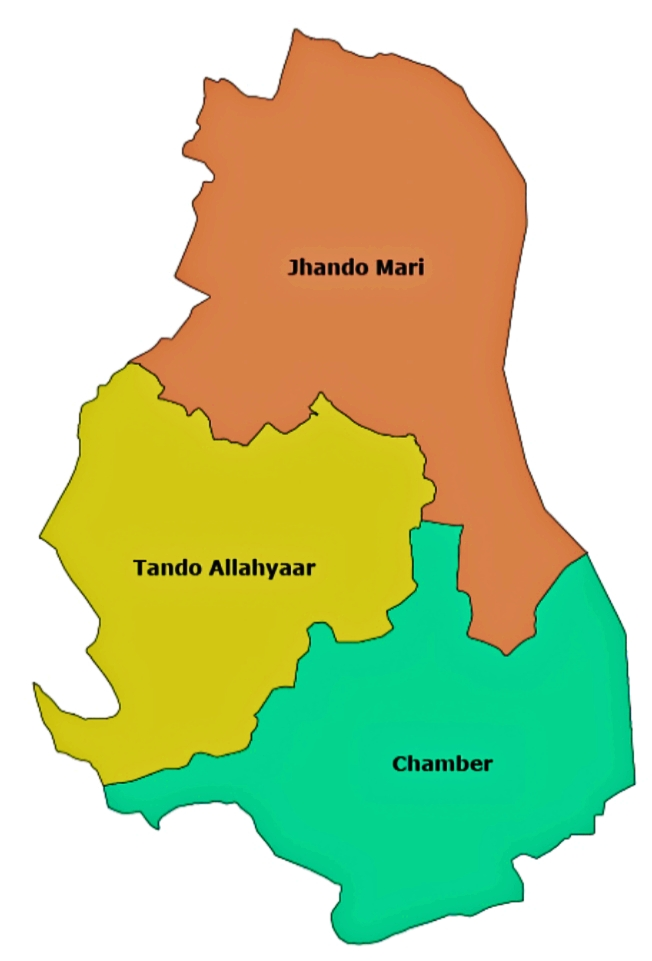
Map of Tando Allahyar District's tehsils

Union Council's of Tando Allahyar District

The district is subdivided into the three tehsils which contain a total of 20 Union Councils:

Taluka	Union Councils	Dehs
Chamber	Began Jarwar; Dad Khan Jarwar; Naseer Khan Lighari; Rawat Lighari; Masoo Bozdar; Darya Khan Mari; Jaarki; Landhi	Arraro, Bail, Buchar, Chachh, Chambar, Chanbeerah, Dhaloo, Garho Sadar, Jarki, Jaryoon, Jhole, Kandiyari, Kapaho, Karyo Gulsher, Landhi, Larah, Lootko, Mangria, Meerankhori, Nagnah, Noondani, Saheki, Sajarchang, Sandki, Sehajro, Sutiyari, Tarahdi, Thull, Wangi
Jhando Mari	Dasori Umar Sand; Jhando Mari; Mirabad; Missan; Sultanabad Station; Usman Shah Huri; Mail Mori; Hingorani; Shahpur Rizvi; Tando Soomro	Aelchi, Bulghia, Chhachharki, Daro Sutah, Daseeri, Dhaghki, Gahaiki, Ghado, Hadeki, Halepotani, Mashaikh Hothi, Hingorani, Hotki, Kathari, Kehi, Khado, Koraiki, Koryani, Langhano, Mail, Makhoro, Missan, Narahado, Nelorai, Nimro, Noori, Palhi, Rajpari, Rappar, Roopah, Sajnah, Seharki, Seharpur, Sonhari, Thebaki, Vesarki, Wagori, Waryaso
Tando Allahyar (city)	Bukera Sharif; Dhinghano Bozdar; Pak Singhar; Shaikh Moosa; Tando Allahyar 1 Tando Allahyar 2 Tando Allahyar 3 Tando Allahyar; Nasarpur	Amri, Bhanoki, Bhatti, Bukerani, Dalki, Daro Qubi, Dhandh Shah, Dhoro Lakhmir, Ghab, Gujjo, Kamaro, Khokhar, Lakhyar, Mareji, Mehmoodani, Nahiki, Nasarpur, Pak Singhar, Reechhal, Shaikh Moosa, Sohna Bukera, Tando Allahyar, Wagodar, Wasanki

== Education ==
District Tando Allahyar is ranked 92nd in the education score index of the Pakistan District Education Rankings 2017 published by Alif Ailaan. The education score is composed of the learning, retention, and gender parity scores. In the middle school infrastructure index, which focuses on the availability of basic facilities and the building condition, Tando Allahyar ranks 75th. However, there was a steep improvement in almost all infrastructure indicators in Tando Allahyar in the year 2016-2017 including more availability of electricity and drinking water, access to toilets, and better building conditions.

Using data from the Standardized Achievement Test (SAT) report published by the Sindh government in 2017, it was found in the "2013-2018 Five Years of Education Reforms in Sindh. Wins, Losses and challenges for 2018-2023." report that Tando Allahyar ranked 8th for student achievement in the language in grade 8. However, with a score of only 41.68, it is still below average. In grade 8, Tando Allahyar ranked at the 7th position for student achievement in maths and 6th position for science.

Administrative and infrastructure issues remain a hindrance for every child in district Tando Allahyar to access free and quality education. Issues reported by the residents via the Taleem Do! App complain of the lack of absenteeism of teachers, lack of basic facilities, and the prevalence of shelter-less schools and closed schools. Some citizens also appeal for their children to be educated in the regional language, Sindhi, rather than Urdu or English. The debate on whether basic education should be provided in the regional, national or official languages has been a point of debate in Pakistan for several years.

== Demography ==
Historical population
Year	Pop.	±% p.a.
1951	106,267	—
1961	140,259	+2.81%
1972	256,994	+5.66%
1981	329,370	+2.80%
1998	493,526	+2.41%
2017	838,527	+2.83%
2023	922,012	+1.59%

As of the 2023 census, Tando Allahyar district has 177,471 households and a population of 922,012. The district has a sex ratio of 103.31 males to 100 females and a literacy rate of 39.80%: 47.82% for males and 31.48% for females. 300,216 (32.56% of the surveyed population) are under 10 years of age. 285,687 (30.99%) live in urban areas.

=== Religion ===
Religions in Tando Allahyar district (2023)
Religion	Percent
Islam	63.12%
Hinduism	36.59%
Other or not stated	0.29%

Religion in contemporary Tando Allahyar District
Religious group	1941 (Note: 1941 census data is for part of Tando Allahyar taluka in Hyderabad district, which roughly corresponds to the present district.)		2017		2023	
Religious group	Pop.	%	Pop.	%	Pop.	%
Islam	59,571	64.74%	549,566	65.54%	581,936	63.12%
Hinduism	31,285	34.00%	286,537	34.17%	337,403	36.59%
Tribal religion (Note: Some members of certain tribes had their religion classified as 'Tribal' in the 1941 census)	694	0.76%	—N/a	—N/a	—N/a	—N/a
Sikhism	434	0.47%	—N/a	—N/a	20	~0%
Christianity	30	0.03%	803	0.10%	1,307	0.14%
Ahmadi	—N/a	—N/a	1,543	0.18%	1,111	0.12%
Others (Note: Including Jainism, Christianity, Buddhism, Zoroastrianism, Judaism, Ad-Dharmis, or not stated)	0	0%	78	0.01%	235	0.03%
Total Population	92,014	100%	838,527	100%	922,012	100%

The majority religion is Islam, with 63.12% of the population. Hinduism (including those from Scheduled Castes) is practiced by 36.59% of the population. Hindus are over 40% in rural areas.

The district hosts one of the major Hindu pilgrimage centre in Pakistan, the Shri Ramdev Pir temple, whose annual festival is the second-largest Hindu pilgrimage center in Pakistan.

=== Language ===
Languages of Tando Allahyar district (2023)
1. Sindhi (85.3%)
2. Urdu (7.25%)
3. Punjabi (2.49%)
4. Others (4.92%)

At the time of the 2023 census, 786,867 of the population spoke Sindhi, 66,805 Urdu, 22,976 Punjabi, 10,552 Balochi and 9,241 Hindko, 6,835 Saraiki, 6,136 Pashto, 3,780 Mewati, 1,920 Brahui, 185 Kashmiri, 7 Shina, 1 Balti, 1 Kohistani, 6,706 others as their first language.

== Bibliography ==
- 1998 District census report of Hyderabad. Census publication. Vol. 59. Islamabad: Population Census Organization, Statistics Division, Government of Pakistan. 1999.
