= Missan, Sindh =

Coordinates: 25.4500°N 68.7167°E

Missan
- Union council
- Interactive map of Missan
- Country: Pakistan
- Province: Sindh
- District: Tando Allahyar
- Tehsil: Jhando Mari

Government
  - Nazim: NOOR MUHAMMAD LAGARI
  - Naib Nazim: MOHAMMAD ASLAM KOREE

Population
  - Total: 13,114

Missan is a Union council of Tando Allahyar District in Sindh, Pakistan. It is one of the largest Union Councils of the District, with a population of 13,114.
