= Hobby horse polo =

Polo with hobby horses

Steckenpferdpolo
Characteristics
- Team members: 6 per side
- Mixed-sex: Yes
- Type: ball game, team sport, outdoor
- Equipment: Ball, stick, hobby horse, sherry
- Venue: Polo field (grass)

Presence
- Country or region: Germany
- Olympic: No

Hobby horse polo (German: Steckenpferdpolo) is a mixed team sport played on hobby horses. It is similar to other polo variants, such as canoe polo, cycle polo, camel polo, elephant polo, golfcart polo, Segway polo, auto polo, and yak polo in that it uses the basic polo rules, but it has its own specialities.

== Origin ==
Hobby horse polo originated in 1998 as a mockery of the expensive hobbies of "polite society" in Heidelberg-Neuenheim, which led in 2002 to the foundation of the Erster Kurfürstlich-Kurpfälzischer Polo-Club in Mannheim. It has since become a trendy sport with various teams in German cities and gained some notoriety in the press.

Playing polo with hobby horses has been described as a children's game in classical polo regions. Hugh van Skyhawk, an Indologist and professor of Islamic studies in Mainz and Islamabad, described hobby horse polo played by young boys as part of the ceremonies of the traditional Gindni (harvest preparations) festival in Hispar.

In 2013 the Grütlihüüler Guggenmusik from Allenwinden (Baar, Switzerland) organized the first Steckenpferdpolo on Swiss soil.

== Rules ==
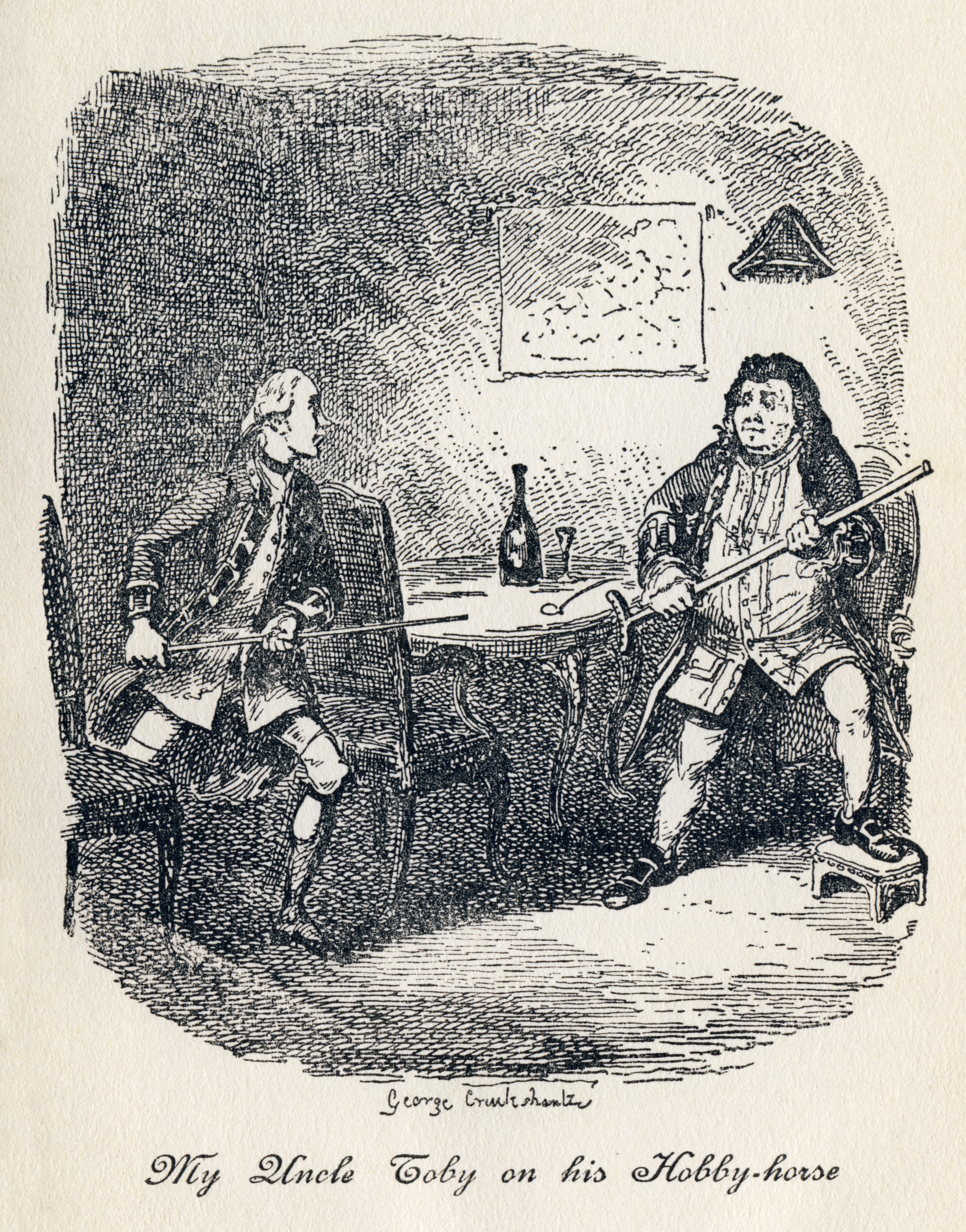
In The Life and Opinions of Tristram Shandy, Gentleman, the characters' hobby-horses, or particular obsessions, are discussed in detail. Here, Uncle Toby's obsession with the military leads him and Trim - who gets caught up in Toby's enthusiasm - to begin acting out military actions. Illustration by George Cruikshank.

The objective is to score goals against an opposing team. The goals are traditionally marked by bar stools in width and height, but simple street hockey goals can also be used. Players score by driving a softball ball (hard despite the name) into the opposing team's goal using a long-handled croquet mallet. A full match has six 6-minute-long chukkas (periods), and each team may consist of up to six people (depending on the size of the field and the amount of interest). The minimum size of the field is 30 m (100 ft) long and 15 m (50 ft) wide. A 'last man' rule applies, as any player may act as goalkeeper. As players need some protection against possible injuries, cleated shoes and shin guards are recommended. The mallets should be stable and are often taped to reduce the risk of losing the hammer head. It is recommended to hit the ball instead of other players.

Each game starts with the teams in line behind their own goals and the ball in the midfield. On the umpire's command "Polo go", the teams gallop against each other, in one hand their mallets, in the other their hobby horses, which have to be led between the legs of the player. It is not allowed to kick or stop the ball with the foot.

Fouls or failures to gallop or to listen to the umpires result in a "punitive sherry" (or other drink such as vodka or Jägermeister, based on the taste of the umpire, or the nonalcoholic Brottrunk) which has to be drunk on the spot. The German rules permit hobbling under the influence but require that it "look particularly silly" as prescribed by the Monty Python walking gag.

Swiss rules for ball in and out of play and the use of free kicks and time-outs are closer to association football and do not involve punitive sherries; instead free hits or penalties are applied for fouls. As the Swiss cavalry tradition keepers from Kavallerieverein Zug had been involved in the first tournament, riding boots are permitted but spurs are explicitly forbidden as well as the production of "road apples" on the field by either horse or rider. However, Swiss teams must confirm goals by neighing.

At the hobby horse polo tournaments in Düsseldorf, the victory cup "is not a cup, but a cheesecake", an homage to the traditional victor's quaffing from a milk bottle at the Indianapolis 500.
