= Ramdev Pir =

Ruler and Hindu folk deity of Rajasthan

Ramdev
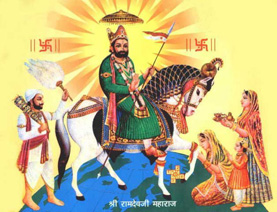
- Ramdev riding a horse with the Sufi Harji Bhati in background

Genealogy
- Parents: Ajmal Tanwar (father); Minaldevi (Menadevi) (mother)
- Spouse: Netaldevi
- Dynasty: Tanwar

Ramdev (Ramdeo Pir, Ramsha Pir (1352–1385 AD; V.S. 1409–1442) is a Hindu deity primarily venerated in Gujarat, Rajasthan and Madhya Pradesh. A Rajput chieftain of the Pokhran region, he is credited with miracles and revered for dedicating his life to helping the poor and the oppressed. He is considered an avatar of Krishna.

== Life and legends ==
Ramdev was born on Chaitra Sudi Panchami in V.S. 1409 (1352 CE) to King Ajmal Tanwar and Queen Minaldevi, daughter of Pamji Bhati of Chhahan Baru village, in Ramdevra, Jaisalmer.

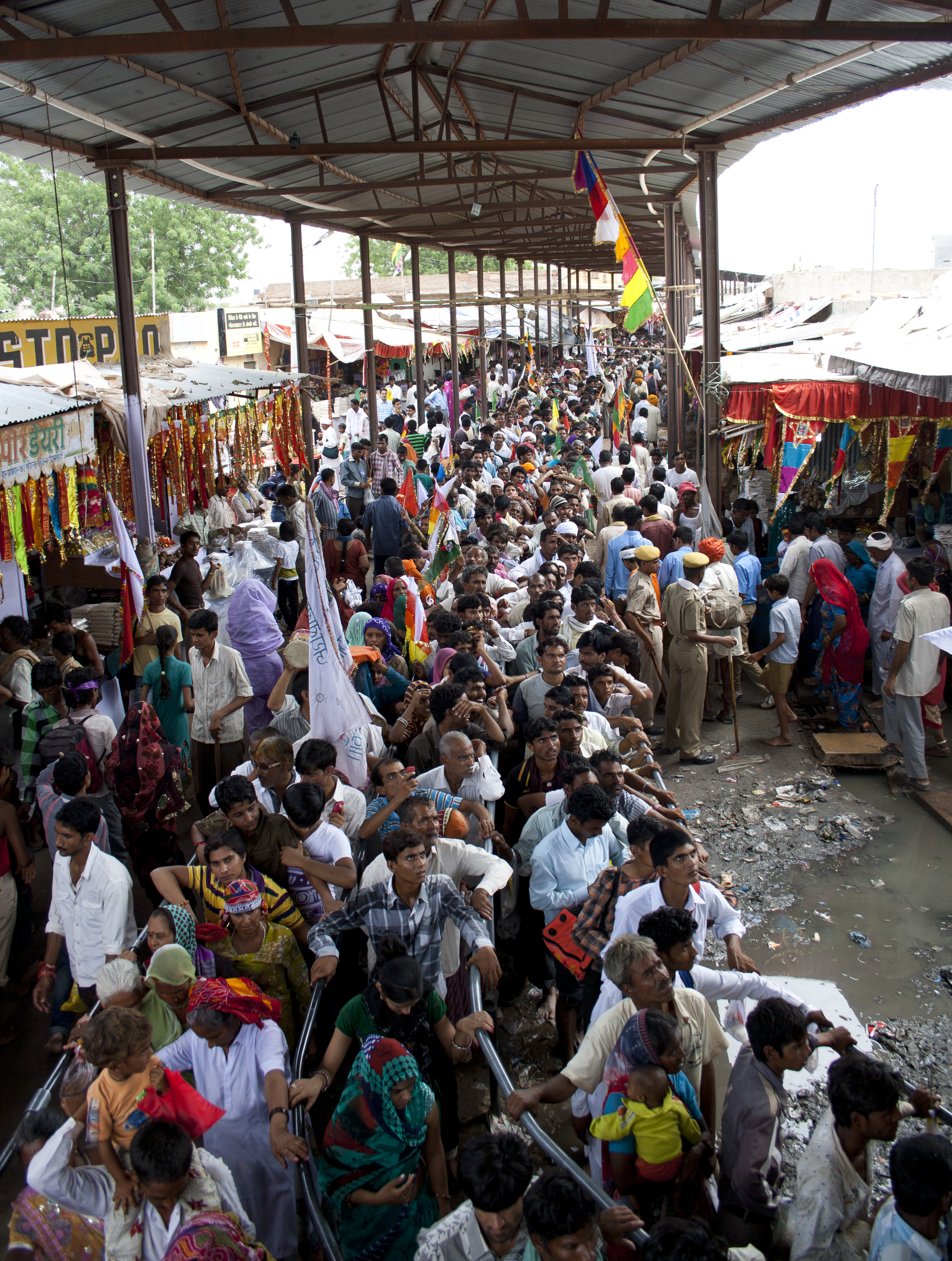
Devotees during the two-month carnival in 2012 at Ramdevra, Rajasthan

According to regional legend, the childless King Ajmal traveled to Dwarka to pray for an heir. Disappointed when the temple icon did not respond to his queries, the king threw a dried laddu at its head. The temple priest, considering the king mad, instructed him to seek the deity in the submerged city of Dvaraka beneath the Arabian Sea. Upon diving into the water, the king met Krishna. Pleased by his dedication, the deity granted his boon to be born as his son. Soon after, the royal couple had their first son, Viramdev, followed a few years later by Ramdev.

According to some accounts, five pirs (Sufi spiritual masters) from Mecca came to test Ramdev's powers. When they declined his invitation for lunch, stating they only ate from their personal utensils left in Mecca, Ramdev miraculously summoned the bowls through the air. Convinced of his powers, the pirs paid homage to him, named him Ramshah Pir, and chose to remain in the region.

Ramdev believed in the equality of all human beings, be they high or low, rich or poor. He helped the oppressed by granting them their wishes. He is believed to have performed a total of 24 miracles in his life.

Ramdev undertook samadhi at Ramdevra (10 km from Pokhran) in Rajasthan, on Bhadrapada Shukla Ekadashi in V.S. 1442 at the age of 33.

== Literary works ==
Ramdev wrote many verbally composed poems, also known as bāņīs (utterances), which later on were transcribed and translated by his followers. His best known literary work is a collection of his poems by one of his followers named Swami Gokuldas, the Baba Ramdev Chaubis Praman (24 pieces of evidence).

== Temples and veneration ==
The primary shrine housing the resting place of Ramdev is located at Ramdevra in Rajasthan. The temple complex was built around Ramdev's grave by Maharaja Ganga Singh of Bikaner in 1931.

The complex houses the samadhis of his disciples like Dalibai and some of his chief disciples. It also houses the tombs of five Muslim Pirs from Mecca. It also contains a step-well known as Parcha Bawdi, the water of which devotees believe has healing powers.

Ramdev is often depicted on horseback. His followers are spread across Rajasthan, Haryana, Punjab, Gujarat and Madhya Pradesh, Mumbai, Delhi and Sindh in Pakistan. Several fairs in Rajasthan are held to commemorate him. Temples in his name are found in many states of India.

In Rajasthan, he is revered as an ishta devata (tutelary deity) of the Meghwal community and many other social groups in the region.

Outside India, a Rama Pir Temple is located in Tando Allahyar, Sindh, Pakistan. Its annual three-day festival during the Hindu month of Bhadrapada, organised by the Ramapir Sheva Mandli, constitutes the second-largest Hindu pilgrimage in Pakistan.

=== Ramdev Jayanti ===
Ramdev Jayanti, the birth anniversary of Ramdev, is annually celebrated in India on Chaitra Sudi Panchami. Ramdev announced a seven-day fair, spanning from Bhadva Sudi Duj to Bhadva Sudi Ashtami, during which saints of diverse faiths were invited to convene in a spirit of unity. As the designated ashtami date approached, Ramdev expressed his intention for samadhi. Concurrently, his disciple, Dalibai, announced her intention to undertake samadhi first. Consequently, Ramdev decided to undergo samadhi three days later, on ekadashi. This decision led to a spontaneous increase in the program of affectionate gatherings and devotional bhajan satsangs, which persisted until ekadashi.

== See also ==
- Ramdevra
- Khatushyamji
- Kanki, Uttar Dinajpur
