= Ramderiya =

Ramderiya (रामदेरिया) Baba Ramdevji "Avtardham"
- village
- Location in Rajasthan Ramderiya (रामदेरिया) (India)
- Coordinates: 26°13′16″N 71°42′52″E
- Country: india
- State: Rajasthan
- District: Barmer

Area
  - Total: 1,299 ha (3,210 acres)
- Elevation: 102 m (335 ft)

Population (2011)
  - Total: 1,250
- Time zone: UTC+5:30 (IST)
- PIN: 344708
- ISO 3166 code: RJ-IN
- Vehicle registration: RJ-04

Ramderiya is a village of Barmer district in Sheo Tehsil from Rajasthan. Ramderiya has a total population of 1,250 peoples according to Census 2011.
