= Deh =

Deh or DEH may refer to:

== Geography and places ==
- Deh (Pakistan), a form of administrative unit
- Deh Akro-II Desert Wetland Complex, a wildlife sanctuary in Sindh, Pakistan
- Deh, India, a village in Nagaur, Rajasthan
- Decorah Municipal Airport, Iowa, United States
- Deh, a village in Bar Kham, Cambodia

== Other uses ==
- Dear Evan Hansen, a 2015/2016 Broadway musical by Pasek and Paul
  - Dear Evan Hansen (film), a 2021 film adaptation
- Dehwari language, spoken in Pakistan (by ISO 639-3 code)

== See also ==
- DIH (disambiguation)
