= Ramdevra =

Town in Rajasthan, India

Ramdevra Runicha
- Village
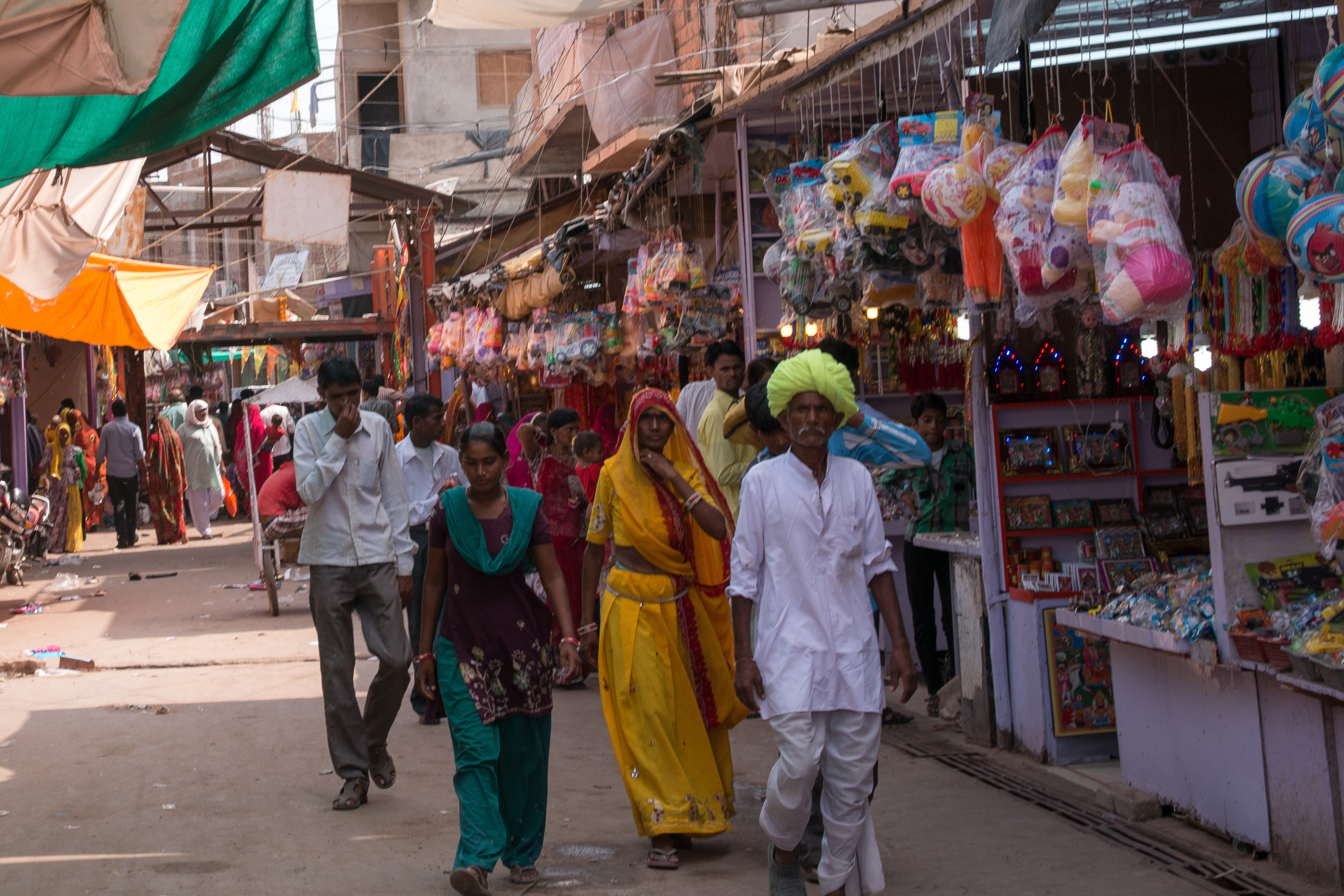
- Main street of Ramdevra

- Location in Rajasthan, India Ramdevra (India)
- Coordinates: 27.01°N 71.92°E
- Country: India
- State: Rajasthan
- District: Jaisalmer

Government
  - Body: Gram Panchayat
- Elevation: 230 m (750 ft)

Population (2011)
  - Total: 9,402

Languages
  - Official: Hindi
- Time zone: UTC+5:30 (IST)
- PIN: 345023
- Telephone code: 02996
- ISO 3166 code: RJ-IN
- Vehicle registration: RJ-15
- Nearest city: Jaisalmer
- Lok Sabha constituency: Barmer
- Vidhan Sabha constituency: Pokharan
- Civic agency: Gram Panchayat
- Avg. annual temperature: 30 °C (86 °F)
- Avg. summer temperature: 44 °C (111 °F)
- Avg. winter temperature: 05 °C (41 °F)

Ramdevra is a village situated about 12 km to the north of Pokhran in Jaisalmer district of Rajasthan in India. Gram Panchayat of Ramdevra is one of the most economically productive Gram panchayat in Rajasthan, as tourist and devotees inflow in village is huge. A fair is held in Ramdevra between August–September, which attracts devotees from other states like Punjab, Haryana, Gujarat, Madhya Pradesh and from all over India. Some of the famous tourist attractions of village are Ramdev Pir temple, Ramsarovar lake (a lake believed to be carved by Ramdev Pir Himself), Parcha Bawdi stepwell, Jhoola-Paalna etc.

== Etymology ==
The village is named after Baba Ramdevji, a Tanwar Rajput and a saint who took Samādhi in 1384 CE, at the age of 33 years. Ramdevji Maharaj took samadhi (conscious exit from the mortal body) in 1459 AD. Maharaja Ganga Singh of Bikaner constructed a temple around the samadhi in 1931 AD.

== History ==
Ramdevra settlement was established by Baba Ramdev Pir, who was son of Ajmal Singh Tanwar - a rajput ruler of Pokhran of Tomara dynasty.

=== Rulers ===
Rulers of Ramdevra ( Runija - Pokhran )

1. Anagpal Tomar II
  1. Amji (Pokran - Jaisalmer)
  2. Salivaahan (Torawati - Patan)
  3. Tejpal (Dilli)
2. Rana Amji
3. Rana Akheraj
4. Rana Bheevraj
5. Rana Jograj
6. Rana Ransi
7. Rana Ajmalji
  1. Rao Veeramdev (Veer devra)
  2. Rao Ramdev (Baba Ramdevji of Ramdevra)
  3. Rajsi
  4. Biko
  5. Lakha (Lakshmanji)
8. Rao Ramdevji
  1. Rao Devraj
  2. Sadoji
  3. Giriraj ji
  4. Mehraj ji
  5. Bheev ji
  6. Jaito ji
9. Rao Devraj
10. Rao Ratan
11. Rao Govind
12. Rao Devkarn
13. Rao Prithviraj
14. Rao Mal Singh
15. Rao Bhopal Singh
16. Rao Raghunathji
17. Rao Mal Singh
18. Rao Ajay Singh
19. Rao Kishore Singh
20. Rao Sawai Singh
21. Rao Chainn Singh
22. Rao Balidaan Singh
23. Rao Hemant Singh
24. Rao Gaj Singh
25. Rao Rinmal Singh
26. Rao Jaswant Singh
27. Rao Bhom Singhji

== Tourism ==
=== Sree Baba Ramdev Temple and Fair ===
Sree Baba Ramdev Temple, in the memory of founder of the village Baba Ramdevji who is revered as a saint, is in the southwest area of the Ramdevra village. This is a very popular temple. In 2024-26 budget the Rajasthan state government announced to developed this as a religious tourism circuit. The birthplace of Baba is situated 150 km from Ramdevra between Ramderiya Undu and Kashmir villages of Barmer district.

Ramdevera Fair, held here from Bhado Sudi 2 to Bhado Sudi 10 (Aug-Sept), is a fair attended by a large number of devotees who come in large groups from far and wide. Irrespective of their caste, creed or religious affiliations, these devotees throng the shrine dedicated to the saint. These groups organize night long singing of bhajans and kirtans to pay homage to Baba.

=== Ram Sarovar lake ===
Ram Sarovar" or "Ramsagar Talab, believed to have been constructed by Baba Ramdevji himself, is next to the Sree Baba Ramdev Temple.

=== Stepwell ===
Parcha Bavdi is a large stepwell situated 100 meter northeast of the Sree Baba Ramdev Temple.

== See also ==
- Ramapir Temple Tando Allahyar, British raj era temple of Baba Ramdev Pir in Pakistan
