= Tando Allahyar =

City in Sindh, Pakistan

Tando Allahyar: ٽنڊوالهيار; ٹنڈو الٰہ یار
- City
- Location within Sindh Location within Pakistan
- Coordinates: 25°27′42″N 68°43′00″E
- Country: Pakistan
- Province: Sindh
- Division: Hyderabad
- District: Tando Allahyar District
- Established: 1709; 317 years ago

Government
  - Type: Municipal Committee
  - Chairman: Samar Hassan Shah
  - Vice Chairman: Saleem Ahmed
- Elevation: 21 m (69 ft)

Population (2023)
  - City: 171,185
  - Rank: 62nd in Pakistan
- Time zone: UTC+05:00 (PKT)
  - Summer (DST): DST is not observed
- ZIP Code: 70010
- NWD (area) code: 02231
- ISO 3166 code: PK-SD

Tando Allahyar (Sindhi: ٽنڊوالهيار, Urdu: ٹنڈو الٰہ یار) is a city and capital of Tando Allahyar District of Hyderabad Division located in Sindh, Pakistan. As of 2023 Pakistani census, city had a population of 171,185.

== History ==
Tando Allahyar was founded during the rule of Talpur, of the Mir clan. When Bachal Yousfani was mayor, inns and guest houses were built as well as colonies for residents and jobs were created.

=== Watayo Faqir's shrine ===
The shrine of the sindhi oracle and that man was presented thinks his own wisdom Sufi poet Watayo Faqir lies at Kuba Shareef near Rashidabad.

=== 1709 fort construction ===
Tando Allahyar was founded in 1709 when Talpur constructed a mud and clay fort about 3 kilometres (1.9 miles) from the present day Tando Allahyar town center. The fort was built to provide security for the Mir and the people of the area. It also functioned as a trading post. As the township developed around the fort, it was known as "Allahyar Jo Tando" (Allahyar's Town). The fort is now called "Kacho Qilo". Some walls decorated at the time of the Mir remain.

=== British rule ===
In 1906, during the British Raj, a railway station was established. It reflected the town's growing importance as a centre of agriculture and trade. The name of the town changed from "Allahyar Jo Tando" to "Tando Allahyar". The British Raj took the fort for its official use.

=== Canal ===
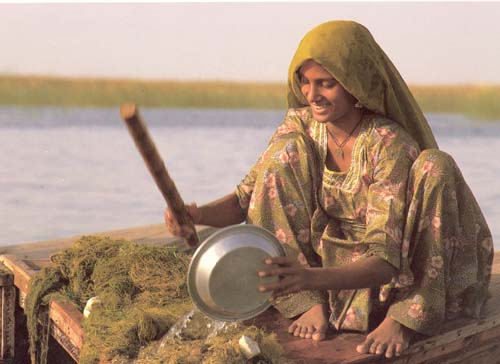
A Bhil Nomadic woman working

In 1933, a canal was constructed. It further increased Tando Allahyar's importance in agriculture and trade.

=== Independence ===
Prior to 1947, the majority of inhabitants of Tando Allahyar were Hindu. The temple of Baba Ramdevji Rama-Pir was a symbol of Hindu–Muslim unity and peaceful co-existence. After independence of Pakistan, many Hindu followers left. Nevertheless, the temple, located in the town centre, remains a popular destination for Hindu pilgrims.

The predominantly Muslim population supported Muslim League and Pakistan Movement. After the independence of Pakistan in 1947, the minority Hindus and Sikhs migrated to India while the Muslim refugees from India settled in the Tando Allahyar District.

== Demographics ==
Population

Historical population

Year	Pop.	±%
1951	11,873	—
1961	17,273	+45.5%
1972	26,314	+52.3%
1981	30,647	+16.5%

Year	Pop.	±%
1998	85,812	+180.0%
2017	156,562	+82.4%
2023	171,185	+9.3%

According to 2023 census, Tando Allahyar had a population of 171,185.

Languages

Languages of Tando Allahyar taluka (2023 Census)
1. Sindhi (74.1%)
2. Urdu (14.7%)
3. Punjabi (4.30%)
4. Others (6.90%)

According to 2023 Pakistani census of tando allahyar the majority of population in this city spoke Sindhi followed by Urdu and many others.

== Temple ==
=== Hindu temples ===
- Shri Ramapir
- Rama Pir

The Rama Pir Mandir is a temple of Ramdev Pir in Tando Allahyar. It is the second largest pilgrimage site for the Hindus in Pakistan. Every year in Bhadrapada month of Hindu calendar, here the three days Mela arranged by Ramapir Seva Mandali.

== Location ==
Tando Allahyar lies 25 miles (40 km) northeast of Hyderabad, on the road between Hyderabad and Mirpurkhas. Tando Allahyar is a railway hub for the Sindh region. Early in the nineteenth century, members of the Bozdar family, a community from the Suleiman Mountains, founded the settlements of Khan Muhammad Bozdar (a nearby village of 52 houses), Massu Bozdar, and Dhangano Bozdar.

Nearby large cities	Distance	
Nearby large cities	km	mi
Hyderabad	42	26
Mirpurkhas	35	22
Karachi	210	130
Larkana	330	210
Sukkur	360	220
Pano Aqil	400	250

== Climate ==
Tando Allahyar is hot throughout the year. Nights often have cool breezes throughout the year.

Climate data for Tando Allahyar
Month	Jan	Feb	Mar	Apr	May	Jun	Jul	Aug	Sep	Oct	Nov	Dec	Year
Mean daily maximum °F (°C)	77 (25)	79 (26)	84 (29)	90 (32)	111 (44)	111 (44)	91 (33)	88 (31)	88 (31)	91 (33)	88 (31)	81 (27)	90 (32)
Mean daily minimum °F (°C)	55 (13)	57 (14)	66 (19)	73 (23)	79 (26)	82 (28)	81 (27)	79 (26)	77 (25)	72 (22)	64 (18)	59 (15)	70 (21)

== Agriculture ==
Tando Allahyar is one of Pakistan's richest agricultural regions. Cash crops like sugarcane, wheat, onion and cotton are cultivated. Mangoes and bananas are also grown. There are sugar mills and some cotton ginning factories.

== Religion ==
Tando Allahyar's population is predominantly Shia and Sunni Islam. There is also a small Hindu community that exists in the city that mainly engages in business. In rural areas Hindu communities engage in agriculture. There are a few shrines in the city in different areas like Bukera Sharif. There is a very old madrasa in the city with the name of Darul Uloom once called "Saniye Darul Uloom".

== Culture ==
Tando Allahyar has a rich traditional Sindhi culture. Women may wear a Shalwar Kameez but often wear the traditional dress, the gharara or "parro". Traditionally, many bangles are worn on the arms. Men wear a Shalwar Kameez distinguished by broader bottoms and a traditional Sindhi-style cap. The youth may appear in western styles.

=== Languages ===
Sindhi, Siraiki and Urdu, are the main languages spoken. Other languages including Rajisthani Qaimkhani Khanzada, dhatki, Marwari, Balochi Punjabi and Brahui as well some Dravidian languages.

=== Architecture ===
Tando Allahyar is a bustling town with mango tree lined streets. Old buildings are topped by chimney-like air cooling devices that catch the breeze.

== Education ==
Rates of literacy are greater in the urban than the rural areas of Tando Allahyar.

Tando Allahyar is a lower-income area, with state involvement limited to constructing school buildings and providing teachers.Tando Allahyar has witnessed a major improvement in education following the recent large-scale appointment of skilled JEST and PST teachers in government schools. These teachers have received professional training from institutions and are now applying their knowledge to better the teaching and learning experience of students, the proof of this is the participation of Region Hyderabad in International UNESCO 2.0 competition in which Tando Allahyar have won different Awards and Appreciations.".
