= Ramapir Temple, Tando Allahyar =

Hindu temple in Sindh, Pakistan

Ramapir Temple Tando Allahyar
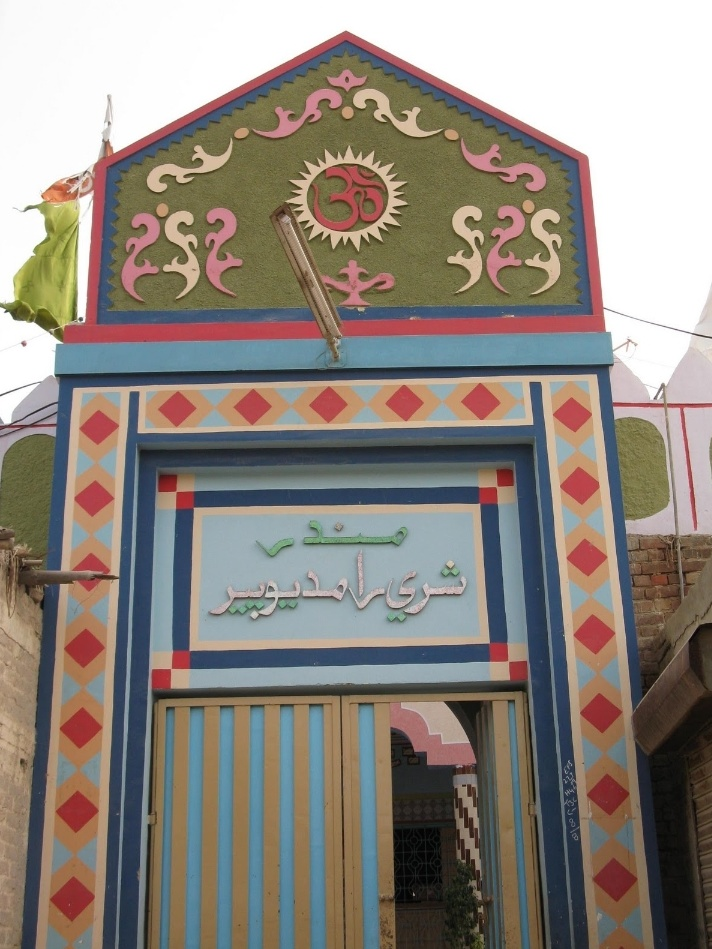
- Gate of Rama Pir Mandir

- Location within Sindh

Religion
- Affiliation: Hinduism
- District: Tando Allahyar District
- Deity: Ramdev Pir

Location
- Location: Tando Allahyar
- State: Sindh
- Country: Pakistan
- Coordinates: 25°27′27.8″N 68°43′18.4″E

Architecture
- Type: Hindu temple
- Creator: Kala Chand
- Established: 1861 (British Raj)

The Rama Pir Mandir is a Hindu temple dedicated to Ramdev Pir in Tando Allahyar in Sindh, Pakistan. The annual Ramapir Mela festival is the second largest Hindu pilgrimage in Pakistan, after the annual Hinglaj yatra, which is the largest Hindu pilgrimage in Pakistan.

== History ==
Ramdev Pir was a 15th century Hindu pir, whose main temple is located in the Ramdevra in Rajastan, India. According to the local tradition, a Hindu man called Kala Chand in Tando Allahyar took a vow that if he was blessed with a child, he will built a temple for him in Tando Allahyar. As his wish was fulfilled, he brought an earthen lamp from the original temple of Rama Pir 460 km northeast in Ramdevra in Rajasthan, India to Tando Allahyar and built a temple here.

The temple was built in the British Raj on 1859, three and a half centuries after the demise of Ramdev Pir in 1459 CE.

The 1907 Gazetteer mentions that Ramapir is also called Ramdev Pir, or Ramdeo Pir or Ramdevji. Hence the temple is also recorded as Ramdeo temple in some pre-Independence records. The Ramapir mela in 1958 was attended by 2 lakh pilgrims. In 1993, the temple was attacked by a mob of 300 people.

== Significance ==
The temple hosts the akhand jot (eternal lamp) which was taken from his main temple in India. Its considered the most sacred element. The dhaja, banner of Ramadev Pir is also considered sacred. It has a footprints depicted in red color in a white flag.

Ramapir has a significant following among the Meghwar community in Pakistan, along with Bhils and Kohlis. Ramdev pir is usually portrayed with Dali Bhai, a meghwar who is the adopted sister of Ramdev Pir.

== Rampir Mela ==
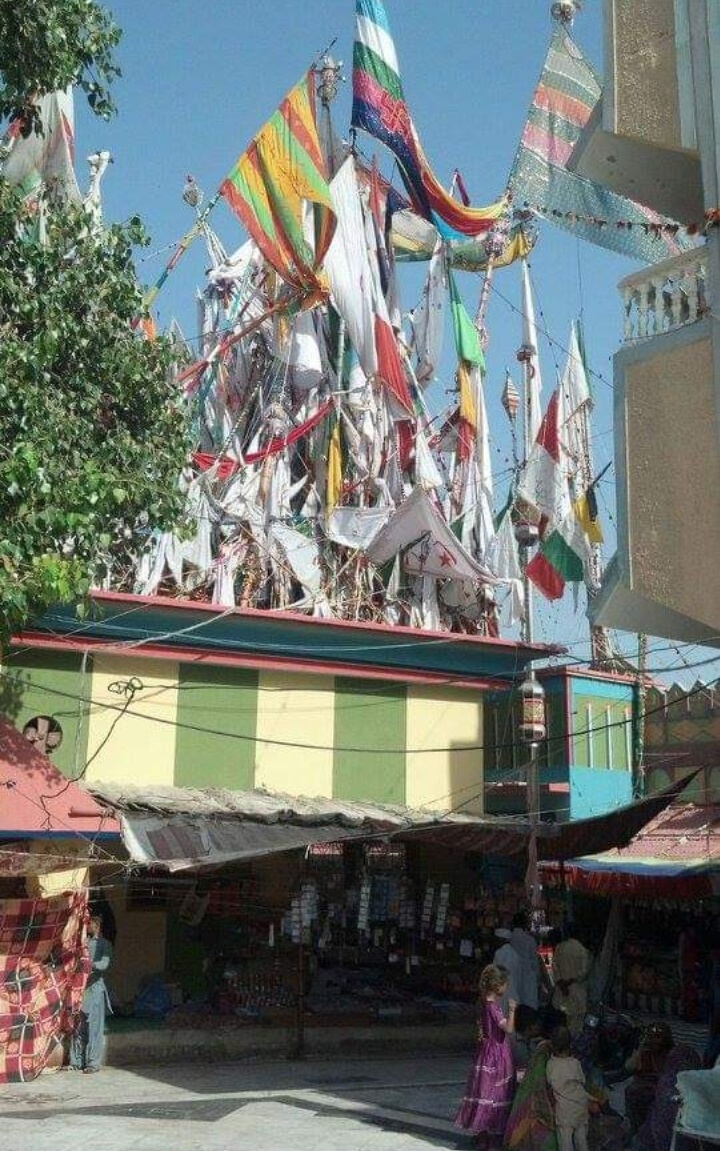
Dajjah (flag) in the temple

The three-day Ramapir Mela is held annually. Thousands of barefoot devotees make pilgrimage to the temple. It happens on the new moon day in the Hindu month of Buhro. In the Gregorian calendar it would be around 11th of September. Many pilgrims comes to the temple barefooted with dhaja. They pray and install the dhaja on the temple roof, followed by the reciting of the Ramdev Pir’s life story.

== Architecture ==
The temple complex is a 2 floor building consistes of the main temple at the ground floor, 7 halls for satsang (communal devotional prayer). Other than this, there is a kitchen, a room where food for devottes is served. There are also rooms for the accommodation of the pilgrims.

There are samadhis memorials of the former caretakers of the temple.

== See also ==
- Hinduism in Pakistan
- Hinglaj Mata mandir
- Prahladpuri Temple, Multan
- Sadh Belo
- Shiv Mandir, Umerkot
