= List of Pakistanis =

Pakistan is the fifth most populous nation in the world. Below is a list of some notable people who relate to the country. See Pakistani people for a list of pages about notable Pakistanis by category.

== Heads of state or government ==
=== Civil / democratically elected administrators ===
- Muhammad Ali Jinnah, "Quaid-e-Azam"; first Governor General of Pakistan, and the main founder of Pakistan.
- Liaquat Ali Khan
- Khawaja Nazimuddin
- Ghulam Muhammad
- Iskander Mirza
- Chaudhury Mohammad Ali
- Chaudhry Fazal Ellahi
- Muhammad Rafiq Tarar
- Hussein Shaheed Suhrawardy
- Muhammad Ali Bogra
- Ibrahim Ismail Chundrigar
- Feroz Khan Noon
- Zulfikar Ali Bhutto
- Muhammad Khan Junejo
- Ghulam Ishaq Khan
- Benazir Bhutto
- Farooq Leghari
- Ghulam Mustafa Jatoi
- Balakh Sher Mazari
- Moeen Qureshi
- Malik Meraj Khalid
- Zafarullah Khan Jamali
- Chaudhry Shujaat Hussain
- Shaukat Aziz
- Wasim Sajjad
- Mohammad Mian Soomro
- Yousaf Raza Gillani
- Raja Pervez Ashraf
- Nawaz Sharif
- Mamnoon Hussain
- Arif Alvi
- Shahid Khaqan Abbasi
- Asif Ali Zardari
- Imran Khan
- Shehbaz Sharif

=== Military / non-democratically elected administrators ===
- Field Marshal Ayub Khan
- General Agha Muhammed Yahya Khan
- General Muhammad Zia-ul-Haq
- General Pervez Musharraf

== Foreign ministers ==
- Sir Chaudhry Muhammad Zafarullah Khan (27 December 1947—24 October 1954)
- Aziz Ahmed (30 March 1977—5 July 1977)
- Agha Shahi (14 January 1978—9 March 1982)
- Sahabzada Yaqub Khan (21 March 1982—1 November 1987)
- Abdul Sattar (23 July 1993—19 October 1993)
- Sardar Asif Ahmad Ali (16 November 1993—4 November 1996)
- Sahabzada Yaqub Khan (Caretaker: 11 November 1996—24 February 1997)
- Gohar Ayub (25 February 1997—7 August 1998)
- Sartaj Aziz
- Abdul Sattar (23 July 1999—14 June 2002)
- Khurshid Mahmud Kasuri (23 November 2002—15 November 2007)
- Inam-ul-Haq (Caretaker: 15 November 2007—24 March 2008)
- Shah Mehmood Qureshi (31 March 2008—February 2011)
- Hina Rabbani Khar (18 July 2011—11 May 2013)
- Shah Mehmood Qureshi (20 August 2018)
- Khawaja Muhammad Asif
- Nawaz Sharif
- Bilawal Bhutto Zardari

== Bureaucrats ==
- Roedad Khan
- Sartaj Aziz
- Nargis Sethi
- Tariq Bajwa
- Fazalur Rehman
- Mohammed Ikramullah
- Rizwan Ahmed
- Tasneem Noorani
- Usman Ali Isani
- Qudrat Ullah Shahab
- Syed Abu Ahmad Akif
- Jawad Rafique Malik
- Sikandar Sultan Raja
- Nasir Mahmood Khosa
- Rabiya Javeri Agha
- Fawad Hassan Fawad
- Kamran Lashari

== Diplomats ==
- A. S. Bokhari
- Agha Shahi
- Jamsheed Marker
- Jauhar Saleem
- Javid Husain
- Maliha Lodhi
- Prince Ali Khan
- Khalid Amir Khan, Ambassador to Hungary, Uzbekistan and Tajikistan
- Riaz Khokhar
- Najmuddin Sheikh
- Tehmina Janjua
- Tariq Azim Khan, High Commissioner to Canada (from 2015 to 2018)
- Abdus Salim Khan
- Shahryar Khan

== United Nations officials ==
- A. S. Bokhari
- Nafis Sadik
- Iqbal Riza
- Patras Bokhari

== Attorney General of Pakistan ==
- Yahya Bakhtiar
- Aziz A Munshi
- Makhdoom Ali Khan
- Malik Mohammad Qayyum
- Latif Khosa
- Ashtar Ausaf Ali
- Salman Aslam Butt
- Khalid Jawed Khan
- Iqbal Haider
- Mansoor Usman Awan
- Shehzad Ata Elahi

== Law officers of Advocate General Punjab ==
- Ahmad Awais
- Shahid Karim
- Muhammad Amjad Pervaiz

== Other major political figures ==
=== A – F ===
- Abdul Ghani, provincial assembly member
- Abdul Majeed, provincial assembly member
- Abul A'la Maududi, writer of Tafhim-ul-Quran, founder of Jamaat-e-Islami Pakistan
- Abdul Rehman Rana, provincial assembly member
- Abdul Qadir Patel, Advisor to President of Pakistan and National Assembly Member
- Adnan Wazir, provincial assembly member
- Agha Shorish Kashmiri
- Akhtar Khan, provincial assembly member
- Ali Madad Jattak, provincial assembly member
- Ali Shah, provincial assembly member
- Allama Mashriqi
- Altaf Hussain, founding member of Muttahida Qaumi Movement – London
- Anwar Kamal Khan, senior leader of political party PMLN
- Asif Khan, provincial assembly member
- Aurangzeb Khan, provincial assembly member
- Bahadur Yar Jung
- Bakht Muhammad, provincial assembly member
- Chaudhry Afzal Haq
- Chaudhry Khaliquzzaman
- Chaudhry Rehmat Ali, coined the word "Pakistan"
- Chaudhry Zahoor Elahi
- Faisal Khan, provincial assembly member
- Faisal Khan Jamali, provincial assembly member
- Farhat Abbas, provincial senator
- Fatima Jinnah, sister of Quaid-e-Azam Muhammad Ali Jinnah
- Fazal Qadir Mandokhail, provincial assembly member

=== G – L ===
- Allama Ghulam Ahmed Pervez, Tahreek-e- Pakistan activist, associate of the Quaid-e-Azam and a scholar on the Quran
- Ghulam Faruque Khan
- Ghulam Muhammad Khan Bhurgri
- Iftikhar Ahmad Khan Jadoon, provincial assembly member
- Ihtisham Ali, provincial assembly member
- Imran Khan, ex-cricket player, former prime minister in Pakistan
- Ishfaq Ahmed, provincial assembly member
- Khan Abdul Ghaffar Khan
- Liaqat Ali, provincial assembly member

=== M – R ===
- Mahmud Ali, leader in the Pakistan Movement, statesman and journalist
- Makhdoom Zada Muhammad Aftab Haider, provincial assembly member
- Maulana Mohammad Ali
- Mian Muhammad Umar, provincial assembly member
- Mir Shoaib Nosherwani, provincial assembly member
- Mufti Mahmud, founding member of Jamiat Ulema-e-Islam and former Chief Minister of Khyber Pakhtunkhwa
- Muhammad Azam Khan, provincial assembly member
- Muhammad Iqbal Khan, provincial assembly member
- Muhammad Riaz, provincial assembly member
- Mohammad Usman, provincial assembly member
- Mohammad Usman, former National assembly member
- Muhammad Waqas Khan, Pakistani politician
- Muhammad Yamin, provincial assembly member
- Mukhtar Ahmed Malik, provincial assembly member-elect
- Munir Hussain, provincial assembly member
- Murtaza Khan, provincial assembly member
- Mushtaq Ahmad Gurmani
- Naseer Khan Khoso, provincial assembly member
- Nawabzada Nasrullah Khan, Ahrari leader
- Nek Muhammad Khan, provincial assembly member
- Qazi Hussain Ahmed, ex-Chairman of Jamaat-e-Islami Pakistan

=== S – Z ===
- Sahib of Manki Sharif
- Saleem Ullah Khan Niazi Paikhel, agriculturist and politician, former member of the Provincial Assembly of the Punjab
- Samad Khan, provincial assembly member
- Sardar Abdur Rab Nishtar
- Shabbir Ahmad Usmani, founder of Jamiat Ulama-e-Islam.
- Shafi Ullah Jan, provincial assembly member
- Shah Abu Tarab Khan Bangash, provincial assembly member
- Shahzada Mohiuddin
- Sanath Singh
- Sheikh Hissam-ud-Din
- Sikandar Hayat Khan, Premier of the Province of Punjab and senior statesman
- Syed Ata Ullah Shah Bukhari, leader of Majlis-e-Ahrar-e-Islam
- Syed Kazim Hussain Shah, Sindh parliament member
- Syed Zafar Ali Agha, provincial assembly member
- Tariq Mehmood Aryani, provincial assembly member
- Ubaid Ullah, provincial assembly member
- Wali Muhammad, provincial assembly member
- Zahir Khan, provincial assembly member
- Zar Alam Khan, provincial assembly member

== Judges ==
- Justice Shafi-ur-Rahman
- Justice A. R. Cornelius
- Justice Abdul Hameed Dogar
- Justice Sir Abdur Rashid
- Justice S. Anwarul Haq
- Justice Dorab Patel
- Justice Fakhruddin G. Ebrahim
- Justice Hamoodur Rahman
- Justice Ajmal Mian
- Justice Saeeduzzaman Siddiqui
- Justice Iftikhar Muhammad Chaudhry
- Justice Mohammad Haleem
- Justice Muhammad Afzal Zullah
- Justice Muhammad Munir
- Justice Muhammad Rustum Kiani
- Justice Muhammad Shahabuddin
- Justice Muhammad Yaqub Ali
- Justice Dr. Nasim Hasan Shah
- Justice Qadeeruddin Ahmed
- Justice Rana Bhagwandas
- Justice Sajjad Ali Shah
- Justice Mukhtiar Ahmad Junejo
- Justice Chaudhry Muhammad Sharif
- Justice Wajihuddin Ahmed
- Justice Haziqul Khairi
- Justice Zafar Hussain Mirza
- Justice Saqib Nisar
- Justice Asif Saeed Khosa
- Justice Allama Khalid Mahmood
- Justice Gulzar Ahmed
- Justice Athar Minallah
- Justice Ali Baqar Najafi
- Justice Zahid Hussain
- Justice Jawad Hassan

== Lawyers ==
- Imtiaz Rashid Qureshi, founder of Bhagat Singh Memorial Foundation of Pakistan
- S M Zafar
- Hamid Khan
- Asma Jahangir, Senior ASC
- Aitzaz Ahsan
- Ashtar Ausaf Ali
- Khalid Ranjha
- Abdul Hafeez Pirzada
- Mahmud Ali Kasuri
- Ahmad Awais
- Wasim Sajjad
- Ghulam Farooq Awan
- Syed Sharifuddin Pirzada
- Sahibzada Ahmed Raza Khan Kasuri
- Akram Sheikh
- Syed Ali Zafar
- Naseer Ahmed Bhutta
- Babar Awan
- Makhdoom Ali Khan
- Khalid Anwer
- Mohammed Jibran Nasir
- Abid Hassan Minto
- Shakeel ur Rahman
- Abdul Ghafoor Bhurgri
- Farooq Naek
- Salman Aslam Butt
- Suman Kumari, first Hindu woman judge in Pakistan
- Iqbal Haider
- Hina Jilani
- Azam Nazeer Tarar

== Human rights activists and philanthropists ==
- Abdul Sattar Edhi, founder of Edhi Foundation
- Ruth Pfau, founder of Marie Adelaide Leprosy Centre
- Ramzan Chhipa, founder of Chhipa Welfare Association
- Hakim Muhammad Saeed, founder of Hamdard Pakistan
- Ansar Burney, founder of Ansar Burney Trust International
- Dr. Amjad Saqib, founder of Akhuwat Foundation
- Naimatullah Khan, advocate, former chairman of Al-Khidmat Foundation
- Imtiaz Rashid Qureshi, founder of Bhagat Singh Memorial Foundation of Pakistan
- Mushtaq Chhapra, founder of The Citizens Foundation
- Sheema Kermani, founder of Tehrik-e-Niswan
- Asma Jahangir
- Hina Jilani
- Abid Qaiyum Suleri
- Shoaib Sultan Khan
- Masood Ul Mulk
- Fatima Lodhi
- Begum Mahmooda Salim Khan, first woman minister in Pakistan and prominent social worker
- Veeru Kohli
- Dadi Leela (1916–2017), educationist, music teacher, philanthropist
- Gulalai Ismail
- Syeda Ghulam Fatima
- Fouzia Saeed
- Tabassum Adnan

== Academia ==
=== Scientists, researchers and scholars ===
- Abdus Salam, Nobel laureate in physics 1979, science advisor to the Government of Pakistan (1960–1974), founding director of Space and Upper Atmosphere Research Commission (SUPARCO), received the Sitara-e-Pakistan for contribution to science in Pakistan (1959) and founded the International Center for Theoretical Physics in Trieste
- Akbar Sitara Brooj is a cancer researcher at NHS England & Oxford University, she made multiple world records & is a child prodigy & motivation speaker.
- Ahmad Hasan Dani, Distinguished National Professor and Professor Emeritus, Quaid-e-Azam University; historian and archaeologist
- Jamal Malik, Professor and Chair of Islamic studies at the University of Erfurt in Germany
- Tariq Rahman, linguistic historian, HEC Distinguished National Professor and Emeritus Professor, Quaid-e-Azam University, Islamabad, Pakistan
- Ishtiaq Hussain Qureshi, scholar, critic, Vice Chancellor, University of Karachi, Karachi, Pakistan
- Pirzada Qasim, scholar, Vice Chancellor, University of Karachi, Karachi
- Attash Durrani, scholar, linguist, Director, Center of Excellence for Urdu Informatics, Islamabad, Pakistan
- Atta ur Rahman
- Alamgir Hashmi, literary scholar, historian, critic, translator
- Chaudhry Faisal Mushtaq, chief executive officer (CEO) of Roots Millennium Schools, executive director of Roots School System, recipient of ‘Tamgha-e-Imtiaz’
- Abdul Qadeer Khan, metallurgical engineer, former chairman KRL, 1976-2001
- Khalid Saeed Khan, principal of College of Physiotherapy
- Munir Ahmad Khan, nuclear engineer, former chairman of the Pakistan Atomic Energy Commission (PAEC), 1972–1991, chairman, IAEA Board of Governors, 1986–87
- Ishfaq Ahmad, nuclear physicist and former chairman of the PAEC
- Abdullah Sadiq, nuclear physicist and AS-ICTP laureate
- Samar Mubarakmand, nuclear physicist, chairman of the National Engineering and Scientific Commission (NESCOM)
- Anwar Ali, former chairman of the PAEC
- Shahid Hussain Bokhari, computer and aerospace engineer
- Salimuzzaman Siddiqui, PhD in organic chemistry
- Pervez Hoodbhoy, nuclear physicist
- Javaid Laghari, aerospace engineer, former Chairman of Higher Education Commission (HEC) of Pakistan
- Datuk Rahman Anwar Syed, entomologist responsible for discovering the biological method of oil palm pollination
- Anwar Naseem, Advisor Science COMSTECH, Chairman National Commission on Biotechnology Pakistan, founding president of FABA
- Atta ur Rahman, PhD in organic chemistry, awarded a Doctorate of Science by the University of Cambridge in 1987
- Ikram Chughtai, researcher, translator, historian, and biographer.
- Ismat Beg, mathematician, PhD University of Bucharest, 1982
- Umar Saif, computer engineer, PhD University of Cambridge, 2001
- Syed Waqar Jaffry, Computer Scientist, Academician, PhD in Artificial Intelligence, Vrije Universitiet, Amsterdam.
- Ayub K. Ommaya, professor of neurosurgery at the Royal College of Surgeons of England; expert in traumatic brain injuries; inventor of the Ommaya reservoir, which is used to provide chemotherapy directly to brain tumors
- Abdul Jamil Khan, Principal of Ayub Medical College, Bolan Medical College, Frontier Medical College, Former Minister of Population
- Hasnat Khan, heart surgeon, head of Pakistan Institute of Medical Sciences; also worked in Chelsea, London
- Arif Alvi, Chairman of Pakistan Dental Federation
- Roger H. Armour, inventor of the hand-held ophthalmoscope
- Sania Nishtar, cardiologist, health policy expert and minister
- Muhammed Suhail Zubairy, professor in the Department of Physics and Astronomy at the Texas A&M University, USl;holder of Munnerlyn-Heep Chair in Quantum Optics
- A G N Kazi
- Mirza Muzaffar Ahmad (1913–2002), executive director of the World Bank for Pakistan and the Middle East
- Mohammad Zubair Khan
- Najeeba Arif, First woman chairperson of Pakistan Academy of Letters(PAL), academic, Urdu scholar, researcher, poet, author.
- Abdul-Majid Bhurgri, hero of Sindhi computing
- Ahmed Hussain A. Kazi, former Chairman of Pakistan Industrial Development Corporation
- Ghulam Faruque Khan
- Hafeez A. Pasha
- Mahbub ul Haq, economist and co-creator of the Human Development Index (HDI)
- Ishrat Hussain
- Salman Shah
- Syed Nawab Haider Naqvi
- Dr. Ziaul Haque
- Asad Umar
- Akhtar Hameed Khan
- Matin Ahmed Khan, marketing expert and management educator
- Bernadette Louise Dean, former Principal of Kinnaird College for Women
- Mary Emily Gonsalves, Sitara-e-Imtiaz
- Bhawani Shankar Chowdhry
- Jacqueline Maria Dias
- Rubina Gillani
- Dr. Nergis Mavalvala, Kathleen Marble Professor of Astrophysics at the Massachusetts Institute of Technology (MIT), and 2010 MacArthur Fellow; part of the team that made the first direct gravitational wave observation
- Adil Najam, founding Dean of the Frederick S. Pardee School of Global Studies at Boston University; former Vice Chancellor of the Lahore University of Management Sciences (LUMS)
- Prop. Dr. Ihsan Ali Sitara-i-Imtiaz Vice-Chancellor of Abdul Wali Khan University Mardan
- Sardar Mohammad Khan, scholar of linguistics
- Zulfiqar Bhutta
- Anita Zaidi
- Asghar Zaidi
- Eqbal Ahmed, political scientist, writer and academic known for his anti-war activism, his support for resistance movements globally and academic contributions to the study of Near East
- Dr.Khalid Manzoor Butt, educationist and scholar, Dean of Political Science Department GCU
- Hakim Syed Ali Ahmad Nayyar Wasty, scholar (history of medicine)
- Amer Iqbal, Pakistani American theoretical physicist. He is primarily known for his work in string theory and mathematical physics
- Syed Hamid Nawab, Professor of Electrical and Computer and Biomedical Engineering, Boston University; co-author of widely used textbook Signals and Systems (1997), published by Prentice Hall (Pearson); researcher in signal processing and machine perception with application to auditory, speech, and neuromuscular systems
- Khaleel Chishty, virologist

=== School teachers ===
- Oswald Bruno Nazareth
- Zinia Pinto
- Norma Fernandes, Tamgha-i-Imtiaz
- Yolande Henderson
- Salima Begum

== Religious scholars ==
- Muhammad Shafi, former grand mufti of Pakistan.
- Jawad Naqvi, Shia Islamic scholar
- Allama Khadim Hussain Rizvi, Islamic Scholar, Founder of TLP
- Molana Tariq Jamil, religious leader and member of Tablighi Jamaat
- Mufti Rafi Usmani, President of Darul Uloom Karachi
- Syed Adnan Kakakhail, Mufti, Muslim Scholar, Founder and CEO of Al-Burhan Institute
- Muhammad Muneeb-ur-Rehman, Mufti, Chairman of Ruet-e-Hilal Committee
- Saqib Raza Mustafai, founder of Idara-tul-Mustafa
- Muhammad Ilyas Qadri, Ameer e Dawat-e-Islami, co-founder of Dawat-e-Islami
- Muhammad Raza Saqib Mustafai, founder of Idara-tul-Mustafa
- Israr Ahmed, religious leader and the founder of Tanzeem-e-Islami
- Muhammad Hussain Najafi, religious leader
- Allama Hussain Bakhsh Jarra, religious leader
- Javed Ahmed Ghamidi, religious scholar, Al-Mawrid International, Pakistan
- Mufti Jafar Hussain, religious leader
- Talib Jauhari, Islamic scholar, religious leader, public speaker, Qur'anic interpreter, Urdu poet, historian and philosopher
- Syed Munawar Hasan, former chairman of the Jamaat-e-Islami Pakistan
- Muhammad Tahir-ul-Qadri, law professor, Sufi Islamic scholar and founder of Minhaj-ul-Quran
- Maulana Muhammad Shafee Okarvi, religious scholar, founder of Jamaa'at-e-Ahle Sunnat
- Ghulam Ahmed Pervez, religious Quranic scholar, founder of Talu-e-Islam
- Farhat Hashmi, founder of Al-Huda International
- Syed Ata Ullah Shah Bukhari, Ameer-e-Shariat
- Amin Ahsan Islahi
- Ayesha Jalal, historian, author and scholar
- Ishtiaq Hussain Qureshi, historian
- Khurshid Ahmad, scholar, Vice President of the Jamaat-e-Pakistan
- Muzaffar Iqbal
- Ehsan Elahi Zaheer Islamic scholar, author and founder of the Jamiat-E-Ahlihadees in Pakistan
- Taqi Usmani, Islamic scholar, mufti, and writer
- Tariq Masood, Islamic scholar, mufti, and preacher
- Khurram Zaki, scholar and journalist
- Zafar Ishaq Ansari, Director General, Islamic Research Institute, International Islamic University, Islamabad
- Zubair Ali Zai
- Moeen Nizami
- Muhammad Sherin
- Allama Muhammad Bashir

== Military personnel ==
- Major Tufail Muhammad Shaheed (1914 – August 7, 1958), Nishan-E-Haider
- Major Aziz Bhatti Shaheed, Nishan-E-Haider
- Major Muhammad Akram Shaheed (1938–1971), Nishan-E-Haider
- Pilot Officer Rashid Minhas Shaheed (1951 – August 20, 1971), Nishan-E-Haider
- Major Shabbir Sharif Shaheed (1943 – December 6, 1971), Nishan-E-Haider
- Sawar Muhammad Hussain Shaheed (1949 – December 10, 1971), Nishan-E-Haider
- Lance Naik Muhammad Mahfuz Shaheed (1944 – December 17, 1971), Nishan-E-Haider
- Captain Karnal Sher Khan Shaheed (1970 – July 5, 1999), Nishan-E-Haider
- Lalak Jan Shaheed (1967 – July 7, 1999), Nishan-E-Haider
- Major Malik Munawar Khan Awan (died May 1981), Sitara-e-Jurat, 1965 war hero who captured Area Rajouri, Budhil and Mehdar from India during Operation Gibraltar
- General Muhammad Musa Khan Hazara, 4th Army Commander-in-Chief, 4th Governor of West Pakistan and 10th Governor of Balochistan
- General Sawar Khan, former Vice Chief of Army Staff
- General Iftikhar Janjua, Hilal-e-Jurat, 1971 war hero of Rann of Kutch operations
- General Muhammad Shariff, former Chairman of the Joint Chiefs of Staff Committee (CJCSC) 1977
- General Iqbal Khan, former Chairman of the Joint Chiefs of Staff Committee (CJCSC) 1980–1984
- General Zafar H. Naqvi, Army Air Defence Commander
- General Mirza Aslam Beg, former Chief of Army Staff (COAS), think tank head
- General Asif Nawaz Janjua, former Chief of Army Staff (COAS)
- General Abdul Waheed Kakar, former Chief of Army Staff (COAS)
- General Jehangir Karamat former Chief of Army Staff (COAS), Ambassador to the United States
- General Rahimuddin Khan, 7 year Martial Law Governor of Balochistan and provincial hero
- General Ashfaq Parvez Kayani, former Chief of Army Staff (COAS) & Chairman Joint Chiefs of Staff Committee (CJCSC)
- General Raheel Sharif, former Chief of Army Staff (COAS), Commander-in-Chief of the Islamic Military Counter Terrorism Coalition
- General Qamar Javed Bajwa, Chief of Army Staff (COAS)
- General Nadeem Raza, Chairman Joint Chiefs of Staff Committee (CJCSC)
- Admiral Shahid Karimullah
- Admiral Tariq Kamal Khan
- Lieutenant General, Akhtar Hussain Malik (died August 22, 1969), Hilal-i-Jurat, 1965 war hero
- Lieutenant General, Abdul Ali Malik, 1965 war hero for his role in the Battle of Chawinda
- Lieutenant General Ahmad Shuja Pasha, former DG ISI
- Lieutenant General Zaheer-ul-Islam, former DG ISI
- Lieutenant General Rizwan Akhtar, former DG ISI
- Lieutenant General Naveed Mukhtar, former DG ISI
- Lieutenant General Asim Saleem Bajwa, former DG ISPR & Commander southern command, Chairman CPEC Authority
- Lieutenant General Syed Asim Munir Ahmed Shah, former DG ISI, Commander XXX Corps (Pakistan)
- Lieutenant General Faiz Hameed, DG ISI
- Vice Admiral S. M. Ahsan, former Governor of East Pakistan
- Air Vice Marshal Eric Gordon Hall
- Major General Athar Abbas former DG ISPR, Ambassador to Ukraine
- Major General Julian Peter
- Major General Noel Israel Khokhar
- Major General Asif Ghafoor, former DG ISPR, GOC Okara 40th Infantry Division
- Major General Babar Iftikhar, DG ISPR
- Rear Admiral Leslie Mungavin
- Brigadier Samson Simon Sharaf
- Brigadier Mervyn Cardoza
- Brigadier Daniel Austin
- Air Vice Marshal (R) Farooq Umar
- Air Commodore Nazir Latif
- Air Commodore (R) Muhammad Mehmood Alam (M M Alam)
- Group Captain Cecil Chaudhry
- Wing Commander Mervyn Middlecoat
- Squadron Leader Peter Christy
- Squadron Leader Sarfraz Rafiqui
- Captain Hercharn Singh
- Rahul Dev, first person from the Hindu community to recruited in the Pakistan Air Force
- Lieutenant general Bahadur Sher (1922–1983)

== Businesspeople and industrialists ==
- Abdul Razaq Dawood, founder of Descon
- Abdul Razzak Yaqoob, Chairman of the ARY Group
- Bashir Ali Mohammad, Gul Ahmed Group
- Byram Avari, Chairman of the Avari Group
- Chaudhry Ahmed Saeed, Chairman of the Servis Group, former managing director in and Chairman of the Pakistan International Airlines Corporation (PIAC)
- Fiza Farhan, co-founder of Buksh Foundation
- Hussain Dawood, investor, educationalist and philanthropist
- Iqbal Ali Lakhani, Lakson Group
- Jahangir Khan Tareen, owner of sugar mills
- Jahangir Siddiqui, owner of JS Group
- Malik Riaz, Pakistani business tycoon who is the founder of Bahria Town
- Mian Amir Mahmood, Pakistani politician and founder of the Punjab Group of Colleges
- Mian Muhammad Latif, Chenab Group, ChenOne
- Mian Muhammad Mansha, industrialist and businessman
- Mir Shakil ur Rehman, Jang Group
- Sadruddin Hashwani, founder and chairman of Hashoo Group
- Shiza Shahid, co-founder of Malala Fund
- Shahid Khan, owner of automobile parts manufacturer Flex-N-Gate Corp, in Urbana, Illinois; owner of the NFL team Jacksonville Jaguars
- Sikandar Sultan, managing director of Shan Food Industries
- Syed Babar Ali, former caretaker Finance Minister of Pakistan, founder of Packages Limited, Milkpak Limited–now Nestlé Pakistan and Lahore University of Management Sciences

== Bankers ==
- Agha Hasan Abedi
- Ishrat Husain
- Moeenuddin Ahmad Qureshi
- Muhammad Mian Soomro
- Shahid Javed Burki
- Shamshad Akhtar
- Zahid Hussain
- Shaukat Aziz, banker and former Prime Minister
- Mian Muhammad Mansha
- Mir Mohammad Ali Khan, Pakistani investment banker

== Arts, literature and other media personalities ==
=== Actors and actresses ===
For a categorical listing of actors in film, see Category:Pakistani film actors

- Adeeb, actor
- Adil Murad, actor
- Afzal Khan, actor
- Ajab Gul, actor
- Anjuman, actress
- Ayesha Sana, actress
- Aamina Sheikh, actress
- Babar Ali, actor
- Babra Sharif, actress
- Badar Munir, actor
- Darpan, actor
- Deeba, actor
- Faysal Qureshi, actor
- Fawad Khan, actor
- Hamza Ali Abbasi, actor
- Hareem Farooq, actress
- Humayun Saeed, actor
- Husna, actress
- Imran Abbas, actor
- Inayat Hussain Bhatti, actor
- Ismat Zaidi, actress
- Ismael Shah, actor
- Javed Sheikh, actor
- Kamal Irani, actor
- Mahira Khan, actress
- Marina Khan, actress
- Maya Ali
- Mohib Mirza, actor
- Meera, actress
- Mehmood Aslam, actor
- Mohammad Ali, actor
- Moin Akhter, actor
- Munawar Zarif, actor
- Mustafa Qureshi, actor
- Nadeem Baig, actor
- Nadia Khan, actress
- Naeem Hashmi, actor
- Kamal Irani, actor
- Nasira Zuberi, actress
- Neelo, actress
- Rahat Kazmi, actor
- Saba Qamar, actress
- Sabiha Khanum, actress
- Saeed Khan Rangeela, actor
- Saima, actress
- Sami Khan, actor
- Samina Pirzada, actress
- Sana Nawaz, actress
- Sangeeta, actor
- Shaan Shahid, actor
- Shafi Muhammad Shah, actor
- Shahid, actor
- Shamim Ara, actress
- Sohail Ahmad, actor
- Somy Ali, actress
- Sultan Rahi, actor
- Talat Husain, actor
- Talish, actor
- Tariq Aziz, actor
- Waheed Murad, actor
- Yousaf Khan, actor
- Zahid Ahmed (actor)
- Zeba, actress
- Amanullah Khan (actor)

=== Directors ===
- Mazhar Moin

=== YouTubers ===
- Amna Riaz
- Mooroo
- Muhammad Ali Mirza

=== Video jockeys ===
- Anoushey Ashraf
- Ayesha Omar
- Mahira Khan

== Architects ==
- Kausar Bashir Ahmed
- Nayyar Ali Dada
- Habib Fida Ali
- Abdur Rahman Hye
- Yasmeen Lari
- Umar Farooq
- Nasreddin Murat-Khan

== Artists and painters ==
- Abdur Rahman Chughtai
- Ahmed Saeed Nagi
- Ajaz Anwar
- Anna Molka Ahmed
- A. R. Nagori
- Asim Butt
- Allah Bakhsh (painter)
- Bashir Mirza
- Huma Mulji
- Ijaz ul Hassan
- Eqbal Mehdi
- Ismail Gulgee
- Jamil Naqsh
- Laraib Atta
- Lubna Agha
- Moeen Faruqi
- Rashid Rana
- Sadequain
- Saira Wasim
- Sara Shakeel
- Shahid Mahmood
- Shakir Ali
- Saeed Akhtar
- Hanif Ramay
- Shazia Sikander
- Suhail Ahmad
- Zahoor ul Akhlaq
- Zubeida Agha
- Khalid Iqbal

== Film and TV directors and documentary filmmakers ==
- Aehsun Talish
- Anwar Kamal Pasha
- Farooq Rind
- Kashif Nisar
- Khwaja Khurshid Anwar
- Nazar-ul-Islam
- Riaz Shahid
- Sharmeen Obaid-Chinoy
- Sabiha Sumar
- Sarmad Sultan Khoosat
- Shoaib Mansoor
- Usman Peerzada
- Yawar Hayat Khan
- Umair Haroon

== Fashion designers ==
- Amir Adnan
- Deepak Perwani
- Hassan Sheheryar Yasin
- Junaid Jamshed
- Kamiar Rokni
- Omar Mansoor

=== Models ===
- Aminah Haq
- Humaima Malick
- Iffat Rahim
- Iman Ali
- Imran Abbas
- Mehreen Raheel
- Reema Khan
- Tooba Siddiqui
- Vaneeza Ahmad
- Zara Sheikh
- Ayaan Ali

=== Visual effects ===
- Laraib Atta

== Journalists ==
- Abdullah Malik (1920–2003), journalist, writer
- Adil Raja, journalist and former Pakistan Army major
- Ahmad Faruqui
- Agha Shorish Kashmiri
- Ansar Abbasi
- Ahmed Rashid
- Ardeshir Cowasjee, columnist and businessman
- Asghar Ali Engineer
- Hassan Nisar
- Hameed Nizami
- Ian Fyfe, DAWN sports reporter
- Imran Aslam
- Imran Riaz Khan Pakistani journalist
- Irfan Husain, columnist
- Janbaz Mirza
- Javed Malik, journalist, working for ARY
- Kamal Siddiqi
- Kamran Khan, Geo TV
- Khalid Hasan
- Khurram Zaki, journalist and TV host
- Maliha Lodhi
- Mazhar Ali Khan, journalist, editor and publisher
- Mehmood Sham, columnist
- Mishal Husain
- Murtaza Razvi
- Nadeem Malik
- PJ Mir, journalist working for ARY
- Rauf Klasra
- Shahid Javed Burki
- Shahid Mahmood, journalist working for ARY
- Dr.Shahid Masood, journalist, ex-Chairman of Pakistan Television Corporation (PTV)
- Sohail Warraich, anchor on Geo TV
- Surendar Valasai
- Syed Saleem Shahzad
- Syed Sardar Ahmed Pirzada, journalist, radio anchor, and socio-political analyst
- Tahir Mirza
- Talat Hussain, journalist working for AAJ TV
- Wajahat Saeed Khan Pakistani journalist
- Zamir Niazi

== Musicians ==
- Abida Parveen
- Amjad Sabri, Qawwal and Naat Khawan
- Aaroh
- Abrar-ul-Haq
- Atif Aslam
- Ali Azmat
- Alam Lohar and Arif Lohar
- Ahmed Rushdi, film song singer
- Ali Zafar
- Amanat Ali Khan, ghazal singer
- Amjad Bobby, film music composer
- Atif Aslam
- Attaullah Khan Esakhelvi
- Bade Ghulam Ali Khan, ghazal singer
- Bohemia, rapper and music producer
- Hadiqa Kiyani
- Hamid Ali Khan, ghazal singer
- Imran Khan, Punjabi singer
- Khawaja Khurshid Anwar, film music composer
- Mehdi Hassan, film singer
- Masood Rana, film singer
- Mustafa Zahid
- Nadia Ali, singer
- Naser Mestarihi, hard rock musician
- Naseebo Lal, film singer
- Nashad, film music composer
- Nisar Bazmi, film music composer
- Noor Jehan
- Noori
- Nusrat Fateh Ali Khan
- Robin Ghosh, film music composer
- Rahat Fateh Ali Khan
- Rahim Shah
- Rohail Hyatt
- Sabri Brothers, qawwali musicians
- Sahir Ali Bagga
- Sajjad Ali
- Shamim Nazli
- Shehzad Roy
- Salman Ahmad
- Sohail Rana, film music composer
- Sheraz Uppal
- Waqar Ali
- Zeb and Haniya
- Alamgir, pop music singer
- Ali Haider (singer)
- Fakhir
- Farida Khanum
- Hadiqa Kiani
- Jawad Ahmed
- Junaid Jamshed
- Jassi Lailpuria
- Malika Pukhraj
- Najam Sheraz
- Nazia Hasan, pop singer
- Zohaib Hasan
- Tina Sani
- S. B. John
- Jassi Lailpuria
- Ahmad Raza Khan
- Siddiq Ismail
- Khursheed Ahmad

== Photographers ==
- Farah Mahbub
- Huma Mulji
- Zaigham Zaidi
- Tapu Javeri
- Sarfaraz K. Niazi

== Writers and poets ==
- Syed Imtiaz Ali Taj
- Faiz Ahmed Faiz
- Rasul Bux Palejo
- Syed Sibte Hassan
- Saadat Hassan Manto
- Khawar Rizvi
- Patras Bokhari
- Ibn-e-Insha
- Syed Irfan Ali Shah
- Chaudhry Afzal Haq
- Mohsin Naqvi
- Agha Shorish Kashmiri
- Janbaz Mirza
- Abdullah Hussain
- Ahmad Faraz
- Shaikh Ayaz
- Amar Jaleel
- Sohail Sangi
- Anwar Pirzada
- Ahmad Nadeem Qasmi
- Afrasiab Khattak
- Alamgir Hashmi
- Qalandar Momand
- Siddiq Ismail
- Anwer Maqsood
- Ashfaq Ahmad
- Bano Qudsia
- Daud Kamal
- Fatima Surayya Bajia
- Ghulam Abbas
- Habib Jalib
- Hakim Ahmad Shuja
- Hakim Said
- Ibn-e-Insha
- Ibn-e-Safi
- Idris Azad
- Ishtiaq Ahmad
- Iftikhar Arif
- Ihsan Danish
- Jon Elia
- Kazi Zainul Abedin
- Khurshid Rizvi
- Majeed Amjad
- Mazhar Kaleem
- Mohsin Hamid
- Mohammed Hanif
- Mustansar Hussain Tarar
- Najeeba Arif
- Noon Meem Danish
- Noon Meem Rashid
- Obaidullah Aleem
- Mirza Ather Baig
- Parveen Shakir
- Qateel Shafai
- Raees Warsi
- Saadat Hasan Manto
- Sufi Ghulam Mustafa Tabassum
- Vazir Agha
- Wasif Ali Wasif
- Zaib-un-Nissa Hamidullah
- Zamir Jafri
- Ahmad Nadeem Qasmi
- Amjad Islam Amjad
- Anwar Masood
- Moeen Nizami
- Fatima Bhutto
- Abdur Rauf Urooj (c. 1932–1990)
- Mohiuddin Nawab
- Fasih Bari Khan

== Sports ==
=== Athletics ===
- John Permal, sprinter
- Kamal Salman Masud, swimmer
- Lianna Swan, swimmer
- Kiran Khan, swimmer

=== Boxing ===
- Muhammad Waseem, WBC Silver Flyweight Champion
- Amir Khan, undisputed light-welterweight world champion
- Hussain Shah
- Jan Mohammad Baloch (1950-2012), Pakistani former olympian boxer, coach
- Sydney Phillip Greve, Olympic Boxer

=== Cricket ===
- Imran Khan
- Anil Dalpat
- Imam-ul-Haq
- Salman Butt
- Asif Ali (cricketer, born 1989)
- Asif Ali (cricketer, born 1991)
- Shaheen Afridi
- Nasir Jamshed
- Javed Miandad
- Abdul Hafeez Kardar
- Mohammad Hafeez
- Abdul Qadir
- Abdul Razzaq
- Aamer Sohail
- Danish Kaneria
- Fazal Mahmood
- Faisal Iqbal
- Fawad Alam
- Hanif Mohammad
- Imran Abbas
- Imran Nazir
- Inzamam-ul-Haq
- Javed Burki
- Junaid Khan
- Kamran Akmal
- Khan Mohammad
- Majid Khan
- Misbah-ul-Haq
- Mohammad Amir
- Mohammad Asif
- Mohammad Yousuf
- Moin Khan
- Mushtaq Ahmed
- Rashid Latif
- Saeed Ajmal
- Saeed Anwar
- Saqlain Mushtaq
- Sarfraz Ahmed
- Sarfraz Nawaz
- Sajjida Shah
- Shahid Afridi
- Sohail Tanvir
- Shahid Khan Afridi
- Shoaib Akhtar
- Shoaib Malik
- Umar Akmal
- Umar Gul
- Waqar Younis
- Wasim Akram
- Yasir Hameed
- Yasir Shah
- Younis Khan
- Zaheer Abbas
- Zahid Ahmed (cricketer)
- Zahid Fazal
- Babar Azam
- Fakhar Zaman

=== Cycling ===
- Sabia Abbat

=== E-sports ===
- Syed Sumail Hassan
- Arslan Ash

=== Field hockey ===
- Hassan Sardar
- Samiullah
- Shahbaz Ahmad
- Shahid Ali Khan
- Sohail Abbas
- Tahir Zaman
- Samiullah Khan
- Basit Ali
- Mohammad Zahid
- Shahnaz Sheikh
- Islahuddin
- Jack Britto
- Imran Mayo
- Mahmood-ul Hassan

=== Football ===
- Muhammad Umer
- Masood Fakhri
- Abdul Ghafoor
- Moosa Ghazi
- Qayyum Changezi
- Ali Nawaz Baloch
- Muhammad Essa
- Sharafat Ali
- Haroon Yousaf
- Qazi Ashfaq
- Zesh Rehman
- Moideen Kutty
- Etzaz Hussain
- Harun Hamid
- Kaleemullah Khan
- Jaffar Khan
- Easah Suliman
- Abdullah Iqbal
- Alamgir Ghazi
- Hassan Bashir

=== Golf ===
- Taimur Hussain

=== Mixed martial arts ===
- Bashir Ahmad

=== Mountaineers ===
- Ashraf Aman
- Nazir Sabir
- Hassan Sadpara
- Meherban Karim
- Samina Baig
- Amir Mehdi
- Abdul Jabbar Bhatti
- Ali Sadpara

=== Sailing ===
- Munir Sadiq

=== Skiing ===
- Amina Wali

=== Snooker ===
- Khurram Hussain Agha
- Mohammed Yousuf
- Saleh Mohammed
- Muhammad Asif

=== Squash ===
- Jansher Khan, 8 time world open champion, 4 time super series champion, 6 time British champion
- Aamir Atlas Khan
- Farhan Mehboob
- Hashim Khan, 8 time British champion
- Jahangir Khan, 6 time world champion, 10 time British champion
- Carla Khan
- Mansoor Zaman
- Qamar Zaman, British champion
- Zaheer Abbas, legendary cricketeer

=== Tennis ===
- Aisam-ul-Haq Qureshi
- Haroon Rahim

== Police officers ==
- Chaudhry Aslam Khan
- Safwat Ghayur
- Malik Saad
- Allah Dino Khawaja
- Nasir Durrani
- Moazzam Jah Ansari
- Pushpa Kumari Kohli, first Hindu woman police officer in Pakistan

== Militants ==
- Zar Ajam, took part in an attack on a New Kabul Bank building in Jalalabad, Afghanistan in 2011. He was subsequently sentenced to death and hanged
- Abdul Rauf Azhar
- Ajmal Kasab, 2008 Mumbai terrorist attack
- Fazlullah
- Ghazi Baba, mastermind of 2001 Delhi parliament attack
- Hafiz Saeed
- Hakimullah Mehsud
- Ilyas Kashmiri, Al Qaeda operative
- Khalid Sheikh Mohammed, architect of 9/11
- Malik Ishaq
- Masood Azhar
- Qari Hussain
- Ramzi Yousef, convict in world trade centre bombing
- Rashid Rauf
- Riaz Basra
- Sufi Muhammad
- Wali-ur-Rehman
- Zakiur Rehman Lakhvi

== Other dignitaries ==
- Abdul Sattar Edhi, social worker
- Abdus Salam, Nobel Laureate
- Aitzaz Hasan, schoolboy who died blocking a suicide bomber
- Akbar Sitara Brooj, child prodigy & cancer researcher at Oxford University
- Arfa Karim, computer prodigy
- Asif Bashir, Pakistani rescue worker
- Malala Yousafzai, education activist
- Tooba Syed, feminist, political worker
- Umar Farooq Zahoor, businessman and a fugitive sought for financial crimes
- Zahida Kazmi, Pakistan's first female taxi driver
- Zubeida Habib Rahimtoola, women's rights activist
- Abdul Rauf Seemab, Potter
- Laeeq Ahmed

== See also ==
- List of Kashmiris
- List of Muhajirs
- List of Pakistani qaris
- List of Pashtuns
- List of Punjabi Muslims
- List of Sindhis
- List of Saraikis
