= Iman Issa =

Egyptian multi-disciplinary artist (born 1979)

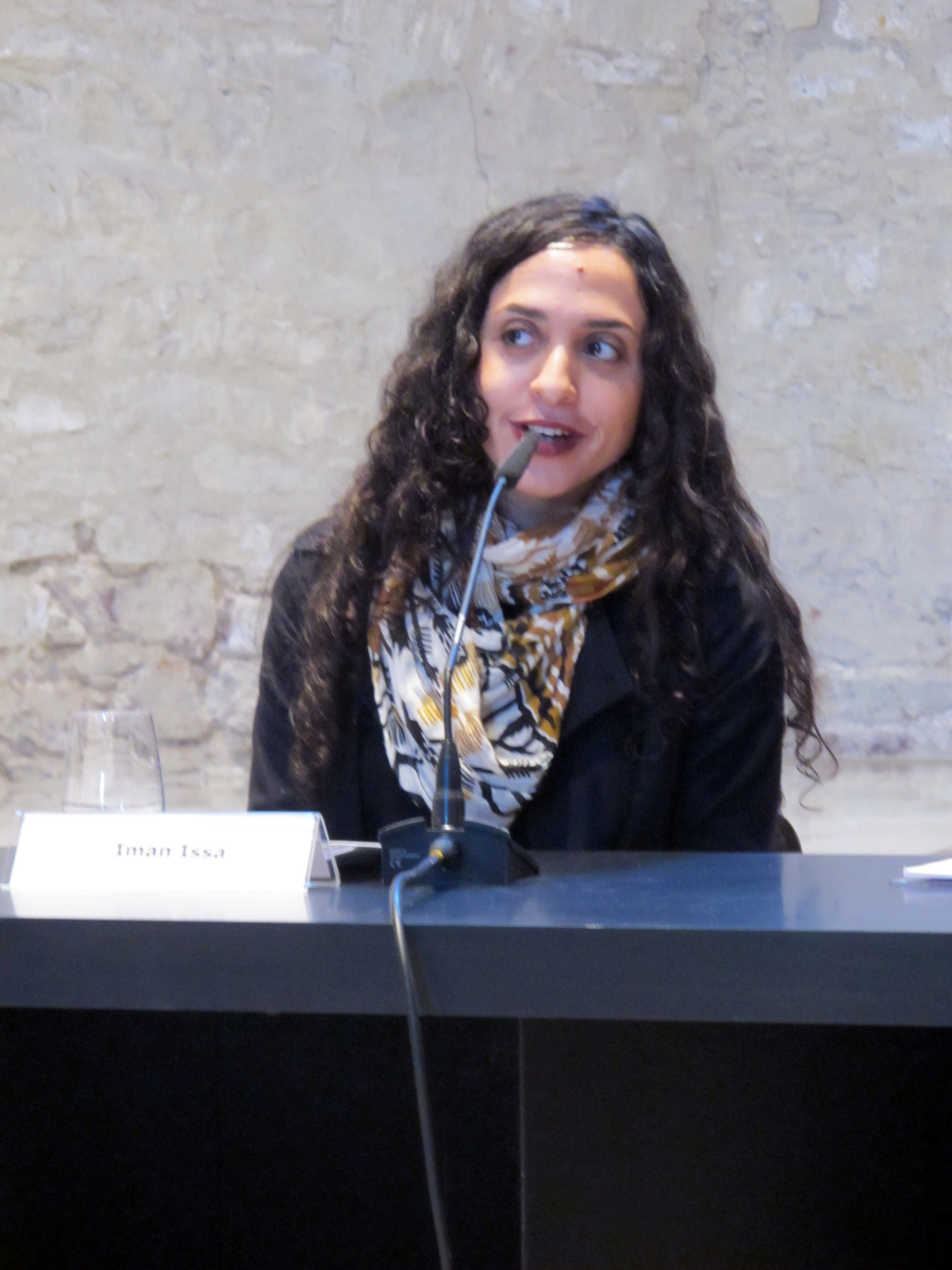
- Iman Issa receives HNB-MACBA Award
- Born: 1979 (age 46–47)
- Known for: Multidisciplinary art (installations, video, photography, sculpture)
- Website: imanissa.com

Iman Issa (born 1979) is an Egyptian multi-disciplinary artist whose work looks at the power of display in relation to academic and cultural institutions at large.

Issa has participated in numerous solo and group exhibitions. Her most notable shows include the solo exhibition, Iman Issa: Heritage Studies at MACBA, Barcelona, Iman Issa: Heritage Studiesat the Pérez Art Museum Miami (PAMM), and Material at Rodeo, Istanbul. Her videography has been featured at the Transmediale, Berlin, Institute of Contemporary Art, London, Tate Modern, London, Spacex, Exeter, Open Eye Gallery, Liverpool, and Bidoun Artists' Cinema.

She lectures at the New School and is currently a part-time professor at the Cooper Union's School of Arts. Issa lives and works between Cairo and New York City.

== Early life and education ==
Iman Issa was born in Cairo, Egypt in 1979. In 2001, she completed her bachelor's degree at the American University in Cairo. She initially studied philosophy and political science, and then continued to pursue photography when the university launched a visual arts program. Issa moved to New York in 2005, and completed her MFA at Columbia University two years later.

== Artistic practice ==
Iman Issa has been producing art since 2001 in various mediums including sculpture, text, video, and photography. Memory and familiarity permeate Issa's work as she navigates through history, language, and political and civic duty. She incorporates three major themes in her art: specificity, site, and movement. Curator Ryan Inoyue of Sharjah Biennial 12 writes that Issa has "developed an aesthetic that mines the latent meaning and transformational potential of objects, ideas, and figures that appear out of sync with our times." Many of her artworks have been inspired by existing monuments or objects but these initial sources of inspiration remain unknown. Hints are provided in subjective titles which describe something about the original work, but in subverting titular restrictions, Issa opens up her works for reinterpretation and communication. Her artwork is aesthetically minimalist and at times, incorporates various mediums to culminate in one artwork she calls a "display."

=== Notable artworks ===
==== Heritage Studies (2015—Ongoing) ====
Heritage Studies is an ongoing series of paired sculptures and texts that explores the void between object and history, unsettling the stability of form and meaning as cultural objects navigating through time and space. Unlike her previous series, Heritage Studies focuses on artifacts from ethnographic and anthropological museums whose meanings are constructed by their designations which she feels have a "particular resonance and communicative ability in the present." Issa engages these objects with history as an existent to designate relationships between sites and artifacts that are contemporarily relevant. Each artwork is presented as a museological display with predetermined didactic labels by the artist. These labels and texts are ambiguous; for example, Heritage Studies #10's copper cylindrical shape evokes an existing monument with only the suggestions of a plaque which reads "Column from the Great Colonnade of the Newly Founded Capital Samarra." This sculpture has been acquired by the Solomon R. Guggenheim Museum in New York and will be featured in the upcoming show, But a Storm is Blowing from Paradise: Contemporary Art of the Middle East and North Africa. This body of works has been displayed in solo exhibitions at MACBA and Pérez Art Museum Miami (PAMM).

==== Lexicon (2012—Ongoing) ====
This series pairs objects and texts to reevaluate and reinterpret visual art from the 20th century. Issa aims to unpack the possibilities of the original works' titles in order to offer new physical expression of their meanings. Issa remakes historical artworks— including drawings, oil paintings, and lithographs—by presenting framed texts that detail the original work with a new reinterpreted artwork, never disclosing the original art. The display's title is only a hint. The viewer's role is to then reconsider the relationship between object and language; he or she reads the accompanying text that describes the initial artwork and must reconcile Issa's new object. Lexicon was first shown in 2014 at the 8th Berlin Biennial and shown again in 2015 at Rodeo Gallery, London.

==== Common Elements (2013) ====
This installation was first revealed in the Abraaj Group Art Prize exhibition, "extra | ordinary" in 2013. It consists of 54 framed text panels, 14 framed chromogenic prints, five wooden sculptures, five painted white plinths, and a caption. The text panels feature quotes from the famous Arab writers: Edward Said, Mourid Barghouti, Taha Hussein, and Nawal Al-Saadawi. Issa picked five autobiographies from the aforementioned writers and lifted excerpts that communicated snippets of their lives tied to broader socio-political context. Functioning as one comprehensive installation, each component contributing to the overall narrative Issa wished to communicate.

==== Material (2010—2012) ====
In this body of work, Issa considers sculpture studies as proposals to replace existing monuments she has known since she was a child. Issa understands the language of monuments and memorials to be limiting and simplistic but used the constraints to probe for deeper context. Once again, the titles of displays are vaguely reminiscent of existing monuments, yet she named them subjectively. One example title is Material for a sculpture commemorating an economist whose name now marks the streets and squares he once frequented; these titles draw on memory and experience to engage populism and political expediency of the original statues.

==== The Revolutionary (2010) ====
This is an audio piece written by Issa and narrated by text-to-speech software which creates an image of a potentially revolutionary character.

==== Triptychs (2009) ====
Each display in Triptychs has three parts: on the left is a small shot of an urban space, a larger photograph with a neutral background displaying disparate subjects, and a three-dimensional element on a shelf or stand. Issa initiated her series by taking images of alluring spaces she frequented that triggered memories and associations for her.

== Awards ==
- Belvedere 21er Haus Artist in Residence (2015)
- Abraaj Group Art Prize (2013)
- Issa is one of five Middle Eastern artists to receive the Abraaj Group Art Prize at Art Dubai where the winning works were revealed in an exhibition titled 'extra | ordinary'. The show focused on projects which explored the boundaries of artistic medium and geographic borders. Issa featured an installation titled Common Elements, and is the third Egyptian artist to win the prize. Fellow awardees include Hrair Sarkissian, Vartan Avakian, Rayyane Tabet, and Huma Mulji.
- Han Nefkens Foundation-MACBA Contemporary Art Award (2012)
- Issa unanimously won the inaugural Han Nefkens Foundation- MACBA Contemporary Art Award and the jury cited the following reasons for this decision:
1. "Iman Issa has achieved a level of visual and critical maturity that is rare in artists of her generation.
2. She has a complex, prolific body of work and a highly developed formal sense expressed through the skilled use of various media.
3. Her artistic and intellectual trajectory testifies to a constantly developing artistic practice and critical vision, a fertile imagination, and a capacity to engage, question, and challenge the viewer."

Platform Garanti Contemporary Art Center, Accented Residency (2010)

Young Arab Theatre Fund Production Grant (2010)

The Arab Fund for Arts and Culture Grant (2009)

== Exhibitions ==
=== Solo exhibitions ===
- Lights, Gezira Arts Center, Cairo, 2002
- Proposal For A Crystal Building, Gezira Arts Center, Cairo, 2003
- Making Places, Townhouse Gallery of Contemporary Art, Cairo, 2008
- Subjective Projections , Bielefelder Kunstverein, Bielefeld, 2010
- Triptychs, Present Future, Artissima 17, Turin, 2010
- MaterialRodeo, Istanbul, 2011
- Material Mercer Union, Toronto, 2012
- Iman Issa , Tensta Konsthall, Stockholm, 2013
- Post: Iman Issa, Kunsthal Charlottenborg, Copenhagen, 2013
- Lexicon, Rodeo, London, 2015
- Iman Issa: Heritage Studies, Pérez Art Museum, Miami, Florida, 2015
- Iman Issa , Glasgow Sculpture Studios Glasgow, 2015
- Heritage Studies , MACBA, Barcelona, 2015
- Iman Issa,, 21er Haus Vienna, 2015
- Reasonable Characters in Familiar Place., Kunsthalle Lissabon, Lisbon, 2015

=== Group exhibitions ===
This is a selective list - a more comprehensive accounting of group exhibitions including Issa may be found on her artist's page at Rodeo Gallery:

- Memorial To The Iraq War, ICA, London, 2007
- “She Doesn’t Know It But She’s Dressed For The H-Bomb,” Tank.TV, London, 2008
- 7th Gwangju Biennale, Gwangju, 2008
- CAIROSCAPE, Cultural Center of the City of Athens, Athens, 2008
- Look Around, Galleria Artericambi, Verona, 2008
- Self Storage, The Hardware Store Gallery, San Francisco, 2008
- Totale Erinnerung, 3 Fotofestival Manneheim Ludwigshafen Heidelberg, Heidelberg, 2009
- Trapped In Amber, UKS, Oslo, 2009
- Dwelling In Travel, Center for Contemporary Art – The Ancient Bath, Plovdiv, 2010
- The Night Of Future Past, Scotiabank Nuit Blanche, Toronto, 2010
- Why Not, Palace of Arts, Cairo, 2010
- Propaganda By Monuments, CIC, Cairo, 2011
- Seeing Is Believing, KW Institute of Contemporary Art, Berlin, 2011
- Short Stories: Iman Issa and Ben Schumacher, SculptureCenter, New York, 2011
- 5th Bucharest Biennale, Alert Studio, Bucharest, 2012
- Abstract Possible: The Stockholm Synergies, Tensta Konsthall, Stockholm, 2012
- Material Information, Permanenten West Norway Museum of Decorative Art, Bergen, 2012
- PhotoCairo 5, CIC, Cairo, 2012
- Ruptures. Forms of Public Address, 41 Cooper Gallery, New York, 2012
- Tea With Nefertiti, Mathaf Arab Museum of Modern Art, Doha, 2012
- The Political Is Collective – Factions, Art Hall Passagen, Linkoping, 2012
- The Ungovernables, Second New Museum Triennal, New Museum, New York, 2012
- Unrest. Revolt Against Reason, Apexart, New York, 2012
- When It Stops Dripping From The Ceiling, Kadist Art Foundation, Paris, 2012
- Homeworks 6, Ashkal Alwan, Beirut, 2013
- Monuments, Lismore Castle Arts, Lismore, 2013
- Speak Memory, Wallach Art Gallery, Columbia University, New York, 2013
- The Fifth Dimension, Logan Center for the Arts, Chicago, 2013
- Utopia Starts Small, Fellbach Triennial of Small Sculpture, Fellbach, 2013
- 8th Berlin Biennial, Berlin, 2014
- A Glass Darkly, Stroom Den Haag, The Netherlands, 2014
- Buildering: Misbehaving the City, Contemporary Arts Center, Cincinnati, 2014
- Conceptual and Applied III, Daimler Contemporary, Berlin, 2014
- Don’t You Know Who I Am? – Art After Identity Politics, M HKA, Antwerp, 2014
- Marrakesh Biennale, Marrakech, 2014
- Pier 54, The High Line, New York, 2014
- 3rd Mardin Biennial: Mythologies, 2015
- Desires and Necessities, MACBA, Barcelona, 2015
- Open Systems, WUK, Vienna, 2015
- Sharjah Biennial 12, Sharjah, UAE, 2015
- Unfinished Conversations, The Museum of Modern Art, New York, 2017

== Bibliography ==
=== Books by the Artist and Collaborators ===
- Issa, Iman. Common Elements, 2015. Print. OCLC 921520091
- Issa, Iman. Thirty-three Stories About Reasonable Characters in Familiar Places. New York: I. Issa, 2010. Print. OCLC 769782150
- Issa, Iman. Artist File: Miscellaneous Uncataloged Material, 1900. Archival material. OCLC 761870976
- Iman Issa: Heritage Studies. Miami: Pérez Art Museum Miami, 2015. Print.
