= Khursheed Ahmad =

Pakistani singer and reciter (1956–2007)

Khurshid Ahmad الحاج خورشید احمد
- Born: Khursheed Ahmad; 1 January 1956; Rahim Yar Khan, Punjab, Pakistan
- Died: 30 August 2007 at age 51; Karachi, Pakistan
- Other name: Alhaj Khursheed Ahmad
- Occupation: Naat Khawan
- Years active: 1968 – 2007
- Known for: Na`ats and Hamds reciting on Pakistani television
- Awards: Pride of Performance Award by the President of Pakistan in 1996

Alhaj Khursheed Ahmad or Khurshid Ahmad (Urdu: الحاج خورشید احمد) (1 January 1956 – 30 August 2007) was a reciter of Naat from Pakistan.

He started to recite Naats when he was only a few years old, and by the time of his death, he had recited thousands of Naats. He used to proficiently recite Naats not only in Urdu, but also in other languages such as Punjabi, Saraiki, Pashto and Sindhi. The melody of his voice and the unique way of reciting attracted numerous people towards him and soon he had become a famous Naat reciter.

== Early life ==
Khursheed Ahmad was born on 1 January 1956, in Rahim Yar Khan. His parents had migrated from Mandrella near Jaipur, Rajasthan, India. He acquired his basic schooling from Abbasi Primary School and passed Matriculation examination from the Colony High School. Then he did Diploma in Commerce from Government Commercial Institute.

In 1973, he shifted to Karachi and joined Radio Pakistan as a typist. The same year he participated in a Naat competition in Dow Medical College, Karachi and won 'First Position' in that contest.

== Career in Naat Khawani ==
Alhaj khursheed Ahmed learned intricacies of vocal training and Naat Khawani from Ustad Ishaq Nizami (Sitarplayer of seniya gharana). Mr. Mehdi Zaheer introduced him to Radio as a Naat Khawan and he started reciting Naats in 1968. In 1978, Pakistan Television held a Naat competition for the first time and he secured First Position there, too. At first, the competition was held at Sindh province level and then at Pakistan level. He took first positions in both the competitions simultaneously. His most famous naat among the people and the one which accelerated his fame was "Zameen-o-Zaman Tumhare Liye". The Naat "Yeh Sab Tumhara Karam Hai Aaqa" was liked very much not only in Pakistan but also all over the world. After reciting this Naat, he became even more popular among the people of Pakistan. Then he went on to reciting Naats not only in Pakistan but also almost in every country wherever Muslims lived.

=== Most popular Naats ===
- "Koi Saleeqa Hai Arzoo Ka, Na Bandagi Meri Bandagi Hai"
- "Zameen-o-Zaman Tumhare Liye"
- "Mehboob Ki Mehfil Ko Mehboob Sajatey Hain"
- "Meray Dil Mein Hai Yaad-e-Muhammad"
- "Jashn-i-Aamad-i-Rasool Allah hee Allah"
- "Yeh Sab Tumhara Karam Hai Aaqa, Ke Baat Ab Tak Bani Hui Hai"
- Mein Sau Jauun Ya Mustafa Kehte Kehte

== Awards and recognition ==
- "Khursheed Ahmad had been reciting naats since 1968 and had won first prize in an All Pakistan competition organized by PTV in 1978."
- He was the first Pakistani Naat Khawan to recite Naats throughout the world – United States, Japan, Switzerland, Yemen and France, Bangladesh, Kuwait, Canada and other countries.
- He was honored with the Nigar Award, a prominent Film Award of Pakistan, for his outstanding Naat reciting skills.
- Pride of Performance Award from the Government of Pakistan in 1996.

== Death and legacy ==
One major Pakistani English-language newspaper comments about his death, "Khursheed Ahmad had recently returned to the city after attending a mehfil-i-milad in Faisalabad. He started having blood pressure problems and was shifted to a hospital. After remaining under treatment for a week, during which time he was operated upon, he succumbed to a brain hemorrhage." His funeral prayer offered at the 'Rahmania Mosque' on Tariq Road after Friday prayer and he was laid to rest next to Hazrat Abdullah Shah Ghazi's shrine. His funeral was attended by many renowned Naat Khawans of Pakistan and media personalities. Qari Waheed Zafar Qasmi, Siddiq Ismail and Rashid Azam are a few to be named. He left behind a widow, two sons and two daughters. Khursheed Ahmad's son Hasan Khursheed and brother Shafiq Ahmad are also naat khawans.

Besides giving performances worldwide, Khursheed Ahmad had also recited naats in the National Assembly of Pakistan before the start of the assembly session.

== See also ==
- Hamd
- Na`at
