= Jamal Malik =

Pakistani-German professor (born 1956)

Jamal Malik (born 1956) is a Pakistani-born German former professor of Islamic Studies at the University of Erfurt, Germany. He retired from the faculty in 2022.

Malik was born in 1956 in Peshawar, Pakistan. After finishing his MA in Islamic Studies at the University of Bonn (1982), Jamal Malik received his doctoral degree from the University of Heidelberg (1989), and completed his post-doctoral work at the University of Bamberg (1994). In 1998, he was appointed head of Religious Studies at the University of Derby. Since 1999 he has been the Chair of Religious Studies — Islamic Studies at the University of Erfurt, Germany. He is also a fellow of the Royal Asiatic Society, a member of the European Academy of Sciences and Arts, and has served as Directeur d'Etudes at EHESS (1994), in addition to having been a visiting professor at Oberlin College (1997), Jamia Millia Islamia (2004-5) and Government College Lahore (2006-7). His areas of interest include the social history of Muslim South Asia, the sociology of knowledge and Muslims in the West.

== Bibliography (select) ==
- Islam in South Asia – A Short History, Leiden: Brill, 2008 (Indian Edition: Hyderabad: Orient Blackswan Ltd., 2012)
- Madrasas in South Asia. Teaching Terror?, London and New York: Routledge, 2008 (editor & co-author)
- Sufism in the West, London and New York: Routledge, 2006 (co-author & co-editor with John Hinnells)
- Religious Pluralism in South Asia and Europe, New Delhi: Oxford University Press, 2004 (co-editor & co-author with Helmut Reifeld)
- Islamische Gelehrtenkultur in Nordindien. Entwicklungsgeschichte und Tendenzen am Beispiel von Lucknow, Leiden: Brill, 1997
- Colonialization of Islam: Dissolution of Traditional Institutions in Pakistan, New Delhi: Manohar Publications, and Lahore: Vanguard Ltd., 1996
- Islamisierung in Pakistan, 1977-1984. Untersuchungen zur Auflösung autochthoner Strukturen, Wiesbaden: Franz Steiner, 1989
