= Murid Kazim =

Pakistani politician

Makhdoom Syed Murid Kazim Shah
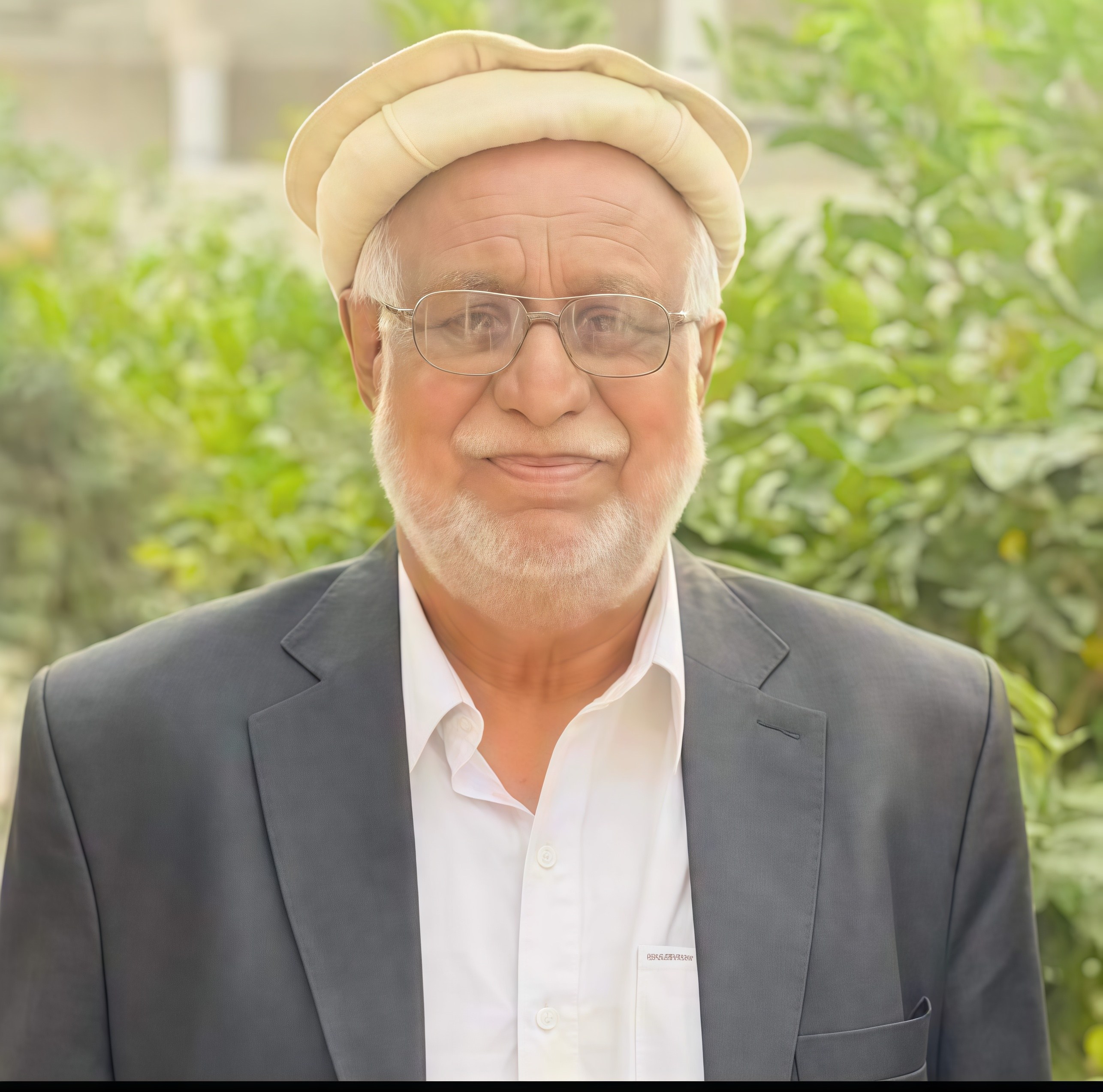
- Born: 25 May 1949; Bilot Sharif
- Died: 3 February 2021 (aged 71); Military Hospital Rawalpindi
- Burial place: Dargah Hazrat Peer Shah Essa, Uch Bilot Sharif
- Spouse: Dina Bibi (m. 1977)
- Children: Makhdoom Zada Muhammad Aftab Haider

Syed Murid Kazim Shah (25 May 1949 – 3 February 2021) was a Pakistani politician who held key ministerial and parliamentary positions in Khyber Pakhtunkhwa (formerly NWFP). He served as Minister for Revenue and Excise from 1993 to 1997 in the government of Aftab Ahmad Khan Sherpao and later as Parliamentary Leader from 2002 to 2008 under the Muttahida Majlis-e-Amal (MMA) administration. From 2008 to 2010, he was Minister for Revenue in the Awami National Party (ANP) government.

== Early life and family ==
Syed Murid Kazim Shah was born as Makhdumzada Syed Murid Kazim Shah on 25 May 1949 to Makhdumzada Murid Taqi into a Shia Muslim family. He belonged from a Sufi family from Bilot Sharif, Uch. He was a claimed descendant of Hazrat Peer Shah Essa, a sufi scholar and historian.

His uncle Makhdoom Atta Ur Rehman Shah was also Member of Provincial Assembly from 1970 to 1977, and he also served as Provincial Caretaker Minister in 1997.

== Career ==
Kazim Shah served for three times in Provincial Assembly of Khyber Pakhtunkhwa, He debuted into the Politics in 1972 in Local Bodies Elections and became a district member in 1985. He contested seat of Provincial Assembly In 1985 but was unsuccessful. In 1993 to 1997 he was first time elected as Member of Provincial Assembly of North-West Frontier Province as an Independent Candidate and joined Pakistan People's Party. He was inducted in Chief Minister Aftab Ahmad Khan Sherpao's Cabinet as the Minister for Revenue and Excise.

Again in 2002 to 2008 he was elected as Member of Provincial Assembly from the ticket of PPP (S) and was Parliamentary Leader in MMA Government in North-West Frontier Province. Again 2008 to 2013 he was reelected as Member of Provincial Assembly of Khyber Pakhtunkhwa as Independent Candidate and joined Awami National Party. He was Inducted In Chief Minister Ameer Haider Khan Hoti's Cabinet as Minister for Revenue.

== Personal life ==
He is the father of Makhdoom Zada Muhammad Aftab Haider.

== Death ==
Kazim Shah died on 3 February 2021 in Military Hospital Rawalpindi due to brief illness. He was buried in his ancestral graveyard of Hazrat Peer Shah Essa in Uch.
