= Siddiq Ismail =

Pakistani reciter (born 1954)

Siddiq Ismail SI PP
- Born: February 10, 1954 (age 72); Karachi, Pakistan
- Occupation: Naat Khawan
- Known for: Hamd and Na`at reciter
- Awards: Pride of Performance Award by the President of Pakistan (1985) Sitara-i-Imtiaz (Star of Excellence) Award by the Government of Pakistan (2013)

Siddiq Ismail (born 10 February 1954 in Karachi, Pakistan) is a Hamd and Na`at reciter and has made appearances for over 50 years on Pakistan Television and Radio Pakistan.

== Career ==
Siddiq Ismail belongs to the Memon community. His parents migrated from India to Pakistan in 1947 after the Partition of India. He started his career at the age of 6 at a local mosque in Old Town, Karachi. He suffered from poliomyelitis at an early age and became physically handicapped. In 1965, he joined the Radio Pakistan program Bachon ki Dunya. Since then, he has been selected regularly for Hamd and Naat recitation on various radio and TV shows in Pakistan.

He has received various awards internationally and nationally and was placed on the list of '500 Influential Muslims'.

"Siddiq Ismail has performed in the presence of presidents, prime ministers, governors, chief ministers and foreign dignitaries."

== Some popular naats ==
- Noori Mehfil Pay Chadar Tani Noor Ki
- Chamak Tujhse Paatay Hain Sab Paanay Wale
- Rendition of "Lamyati Nazeeero" written by Ahmed Raza Khan Barelvi

== Awards and recognition ==
- Sitara-i-Imtiaz in 2013
- Pride of Performance in 1985
