= Sanath Singh =

Sanath Singh is a Pakistani politician who served as a member of the Provincial Assembly of Balochistan from 1993 to 1996. He is the first and only Sikh politician to serve in the Balochistan's legislative assembly.
