= Sitara Brooj Akbar =

Pakistani financial officer (born 2000)

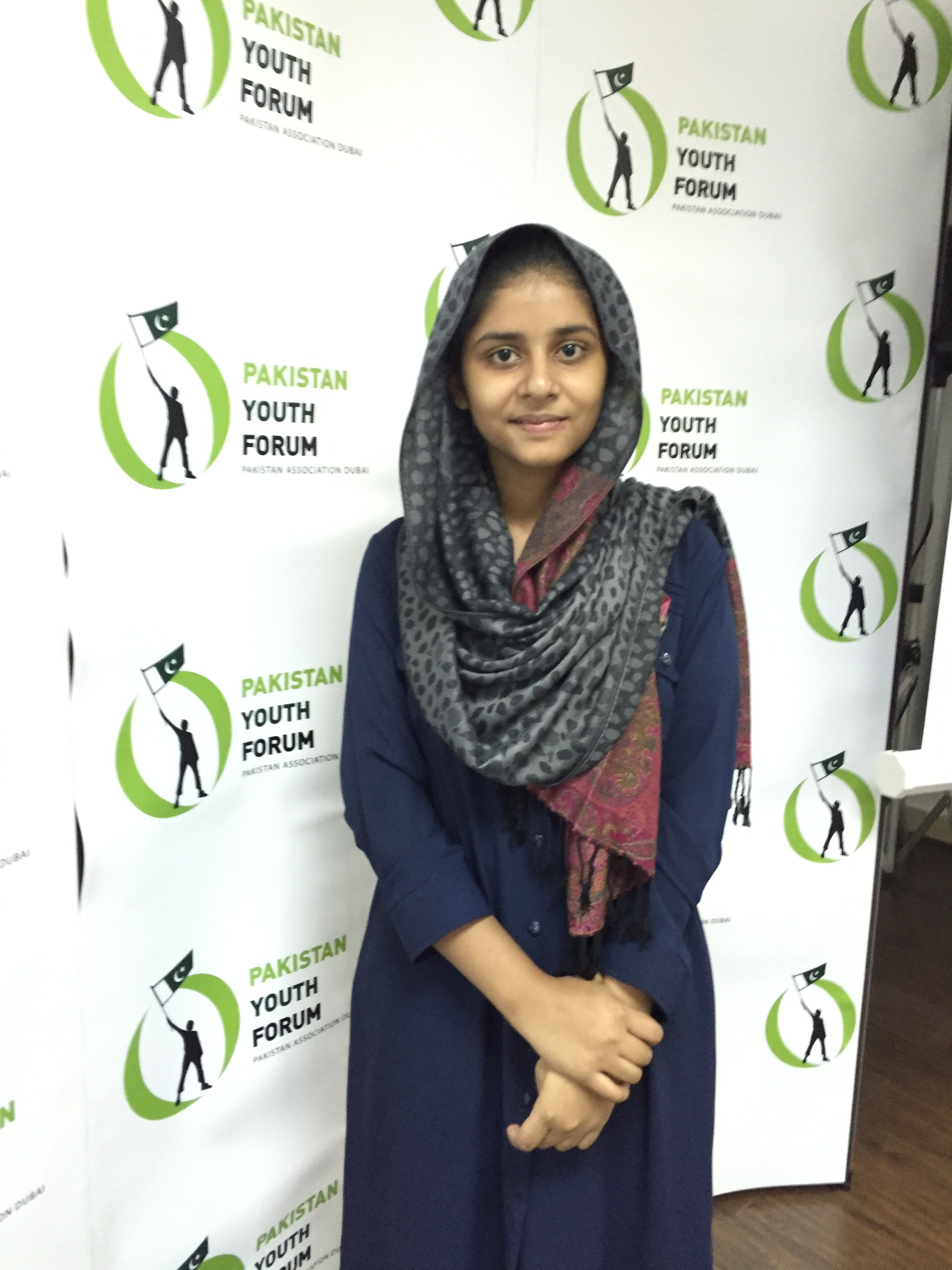
- Akbar at her first press conference as PYF's youth ambassador
- Born: 10 February 2000 (age 26); Rabwah, Pakistan
- Education: Reuben College, Oxford
- Occupations: Chief financial officer Youth ambassador
- Years active: 2005–present
- Known for: Youngest Certified Anti-Money Laundering Specialist

Sitara Brooj Akbar (born 10 February 2000) is the Pakistani chief financial officer of Dubai-based investment company Al Ahad Group. She first received attention for speaking to crowds and appearing on national television at the age of 5. In 2023 Sitara was a graduate student at the University of Oxford and NHS England, Genomics England. She is the world's youngest Certified Anti Money Laundering Specialist (CAMS). She is also the youngest person to earn a band 9/9 in IELTS overall, at the age of 15. Sitara is a motivational speaker and women's rights activist.

In 2015, Sitara became the youngest Pakistan youth forum ambassador in UAE, at age 15.

In 2021, Sitara requested the prime minister of Pakistan to remove the age limit of the civil services exam; her request was denied.

== Recognition ==
Some of her achievements are as below:

- Gold Medal Awarded by the President of Pakistan
- Talented Children's Award awarded by the Prime Minister of Pakistan
- Country of Kalamar, Sweden Award
- Outstanding Pakistani Award from the Nazaria Pakistan Council
- Honorary Shield of Appreciation from Pakistan's Ambassador to UAE
- Certificates of appreciation by British Council
- Active Citizens Award by British Council
- Meri Pehchan Pakistan Award by Pakistan Association, Dubai
- Certificate from Parliamentary Forum on Child Rights

== Early life and education ==
Sitara Brooj Akbar was born on 10 February 2000, in Rabwah in Punjab, Pakistan. She is the eldest of 5 siblings, and belongs to the Ahmadiyya Muslim Community.

She is passionate about public speaking and began addressing gatherings at the age of five. She is serving as the youth ambassador for Pakistan Association Dubai. She is interested in research, community work and international relations.

She went on to set several Pakistani and world records based on her passing of O Level in 5 subjects by the age of 11. She completed her A Levels at age 13. Akbar was also permitted by the British Council to undertake the International English Language Testing System (IELTS) test in 2011, and achieved a score of 7 bands at age 11. She went on to become the youngest non-native English speaker to score 9 out of 9 bands in IELTS at age 15.

Akbar did her postgraduate studies from the University of Oxford.

=== Germany ===
In February 2024, Sitara received an invitation to Heidelberg from city council member Waseem Butt. She was greeted by Mayor Stefanie Jansen and MNA Alexander Föhr. Sitara was invited to work and study at Germany's largest cancer hospital located in Heidelberg. Additionally, Member of the Bundestag Alexander Fohr extended an invitation for her to visit the German parliament and meet with parliamentarians.

== Career ==
As of November 2026 Akbar is the chief financial officer of the Dubai-based investment company the Al Ahad Group.
