= Syed Kazim Hussain Shah =

Pakistani politician

- سید کاظم حسین شاہ

Advisor to the Chief Minister of Sindh

Member of the Provincial Assembly of Sindh

Personal details
- Born: Syed Kazim Hussain Shah
- Died: 6 May 2007
- Party: Pakistan Muslim League (N)

Syed Kazim Hussain Shah (Urdu: سید کاظم حسین شاہ) was a Pakistani politician who served as a Member of the Provincial Assembly of Sindh, through his political party Pakistan Muslim League (N) from the Shaheed Benazirabad District. He was also appointed as the advisor to the Chief Minister of Sindh Abdullah Ali Shah in 1994. Shah used to be the former chairman of Pakistan Khidmat Khalf. Shah received numerous awards for his actions.

== Career ==
Shah was elected as a Member to the Provincial Assembly of Sindh in 1987. In 1994, he was appointed as advisor to the Chief Minister of Sindh, Abdullah Ali Shah.
