= Moeen Nizami =

Pakistani poet (born 1965)

- معین نظامی
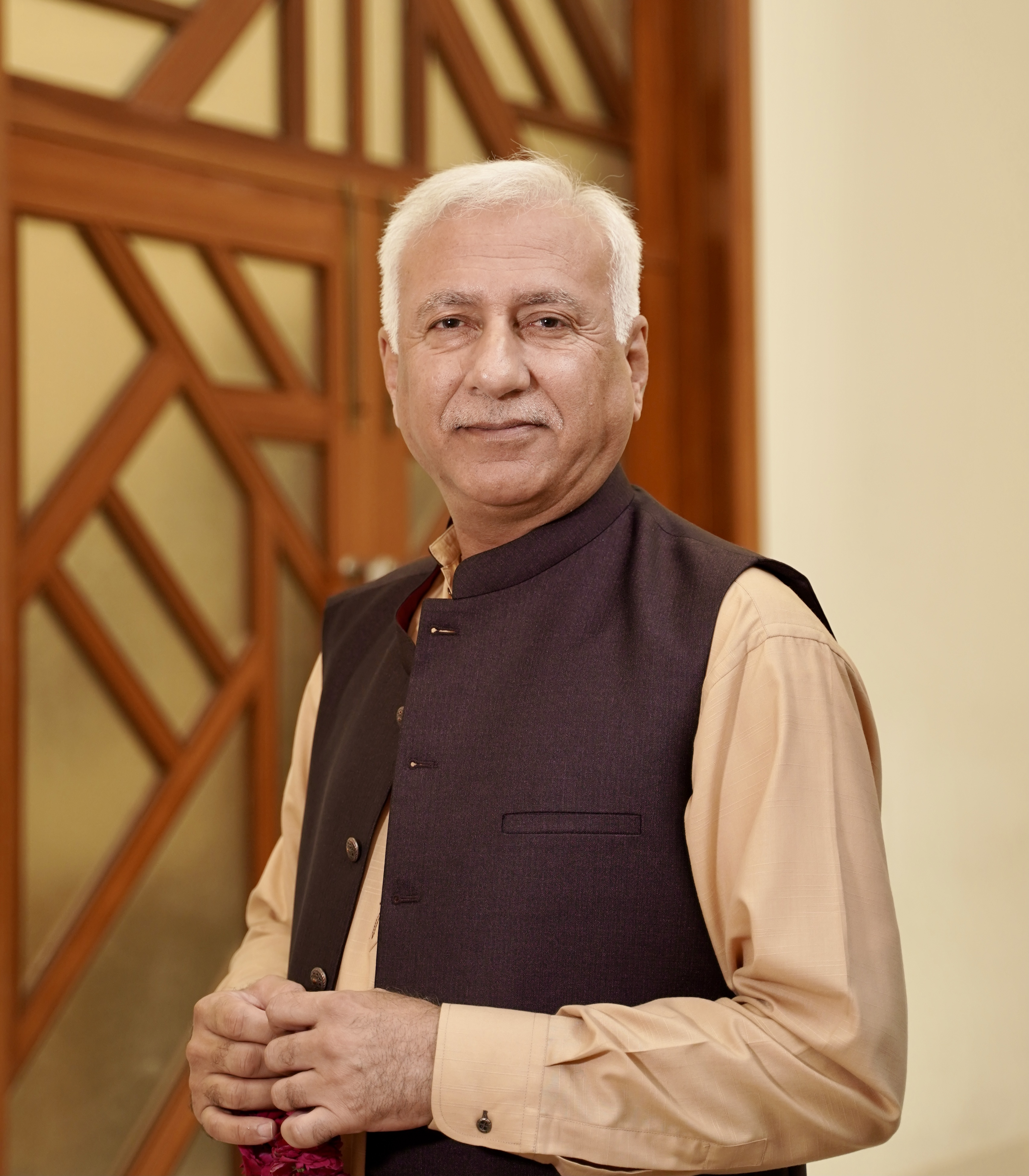
- Dr. Moeen Nizami
- Born: Ghulam Moeen Ud Din; 1 February 1965 (age 61); Sargodha, Pakistan
- Occupations: Writer, Urdu poet, scholar, professor
- Parent: Ghulam Nizam Ud Din (Father)
- Website: moeennizami.com

Moeen Nizami (Urdu: معین نظامی, born Ghulam Moeen Ud Din on 1 February 1965) is a Pakistani Urdu poet, literary and religious scholar specialized in Persian language and tasawwuf, and Allama Muhammad Iqbal studies. 'Moeen' is his pen name, (in Urdu takhalus). He is a professor of Persian language and literature, Chairman Department of Persian, Head Hujveri Tasawwuf chair, University of the Punjab, Lahore, Pakistan. Nizami has authored over 50 Persian and Urdu (literary and research) books and more than 60 papers published in local and foreign journals. Two of his books were published in Tehran, Iran. He achieved two awards of best manuscript research by the Iran Ministry of Culture and Islamic Guidance in 2006 and 2007. He received Iqbal Award from The Governor of Punjab, Pakistan, in 2021 and The Tamgha e Imtiaz from the Government of Pakistan in 2025.

. Tasawwuf Classical and modern Persian, Urdu and Punjabi literature, Islamic Arts and literary translations are his special fields of interest.

== Early life ==
Nizami was born in Sargodha, Pakistan to a Sufi family of Chishti Order. He learned basic Arabic and Persian language from his grandfather Ghulam Sadeed Ud Din. He matriculated in 1981 and received Intermediate with the Faculty of Arts diploma from BISE Sargodha in 1983. The same year he enrolled at the University of the Punjab Lahore where he obtained his Bachelor of Arts in Persian, Islamic Studies and Arabic in 1985. In 1986–87, he received his Masters of Arts degree from the same institute and had the first place in Punjab University, Lahore. During his studies, he began to write poetry in Urdu and Persian.

== Academic career ==
Moeen Nizami, after completing his Master of Arts degree in 1986–87, began his career as a reader of Persian and Urdu at Cultural Conciliate, Iran Embassy, Islamabad and shortly afterwards was selected as a lecturer of Persian language and Literature at University of the Punjab Lahore, where he had also been a student in the past. He started working as a professor of Persian and Urdu and as Director Gurmani Centre For Languages and Literature at Lahore University of Management Sciences. He has participated in more than 35 national and international conferences. Nizami is also a member of the advisory board of Bunyad, a journal of Urdu Studies, Lahore University of Management Sciences, Lahore. Nizami was appointed principal of Oriental College, University of the Punjab on 5 April 2021.and performed his duties in the same capacity till 31st january 2024.

== Selected publications ==
He has authored more than 50 books based on literature and poetry (Ghazal, Nazm). His poetry books include Neend Se Bojhal Aankhen, Istekhara, Talismaat, Tajseem ,Matrook,Mutarad,Naan o Namak. A book written by him named Moeen e Farsi, is taught as an allied subject at Bachelor level in Pakistan.

Poetry books in Urdu and Persian include:

- Matrook
- Naan o Namak
- Mustarad
- Istekhara
- Talismaat
- Iqbaal Shanasi Vol. 1,2,3
- Moeen al Tareeqat
- Tajseem
- Neend Se Bojhal Aankhen
- Jhalak
- Dewan-e-Saeed Khan Multani Qasaid, Ghazalyat-o-Maqattat
- Saraye Maula, translation of sayings of Shaykh Abu Al Hasan Kharkani
