= Raza Saqib Mustafai =

Pakistani Islamic preacher and scholar (born 1972)

Pirzada Muhammad Raza Saqib Mustafai محمد رضا ثاقب مصطفائی

Personal life
- Born: Muhammad Raza; 16 March 1972 (age 54) Gujranwala, Punjab, Pakistan
- Spouse: Umm-e-Hamza
- Era: Modern era
- Region: Pakistan
- Occupation: Religious scholar
- Website: idaratulmustafa.com

Religious life
- Religion: Islam
- Denomination: Sunni
- Jurisprudence: Hanafi
- Tariqa: Naqshbandi
- Creed: Maturidi
- Movement: Barelvi

Muslim leader
- Awards: Sitara-e-Imtiaz (Star of Excellence) Award by the President of Pakistan (2023)

YouTube information
- Channel: Muhammad Raza Saqib Mustafai
- Years active: 2016–present
- Subscribers: 1.43 million
- Views: 85.8 million
- Last updated: 4 August 2026

Muhammad Raza Saqib Mustafai (Urdu: محمد رضا ثاقب مصطفائی; born 16 March 1972) is a Pakistani Islamic preacher and scholar.

He is the founding chairman of Idara-tul-Mustafa International.

He is the custodian of shrine Peer Khawaja Deen Muhammad Mustafai and has following in Pakistan, India, Bangladesh, Sri Lanka, United Kingdom, United Arab Emirates, United States, etc.

== Early and personal life ==
Muhammad Raza Saqib Mustafai was born to Peer Khwaja Deen Muhammad Mustafai on 16 March 1972 AD same as 30 Muharram 1392 AH in Gujranwala, Punjab.

Mustafai is married to Umm-e-Hamza and they have a son.

== Career ==
=== Religious views ===
He is a follower of the Naqshbandi Sufi order and supports the Sufi practices of Mawlid (prophet's birthday), Urs (commemoration of a saint) and Bay'ah (an oath of loyalty to a sheikh).

=== Religious organizations ===
He's the founding chairman of Idara-tul-Mustafa International, a religious organization that promotes the Barelvi approach to Sunni Islam and which has branches in many cities of the country, running educational institutes, social services, etc.

=== Wedding of the former Pakistan Army chief's son ===
In November 2018, he performed the marriage ceremony of the Pakistan Army chief Qamar Javed Bajwa's son, Saad Bajwa, in Lahore.

== Controversies ==
=== Alleged antisemitism ===
In 2016, when Mustafai was on a tour of Australia, he was asked to leave the country because of his antisemitic views. The Australian Broadcasting Corporation described him as "a Pakistani Sunni cleric, Muhammad Raza Saqib Mustafai, who has called for the extermination of all Jews from the earth". The Australian said that the person who had asked him to leave was "the imam who organised the tour ... from Blacktown Mosque". The MP Mehreen Faruqi was quoted as saying "I am appalled and absolutely shocked to see someone who is supposed to be a Muslim scholar spouting such hate-filled speech".

== Books ==
- Khutbat-e-Seerat-un-Nabi ("Speeches on the Life of the Prophet"/خطباتِ سیرت النبی), 400 pp.

== Awards and recognitions ==
- Sitara-e-Imtiaz (Star of Excellence) Award by the President of Pakistan in 2023
