= Syed Sardar Ahmed Pirzada =

Pakistani journalist

Syed Sardar Ahmed Pirzada سید سردار احمد پیرزادہ
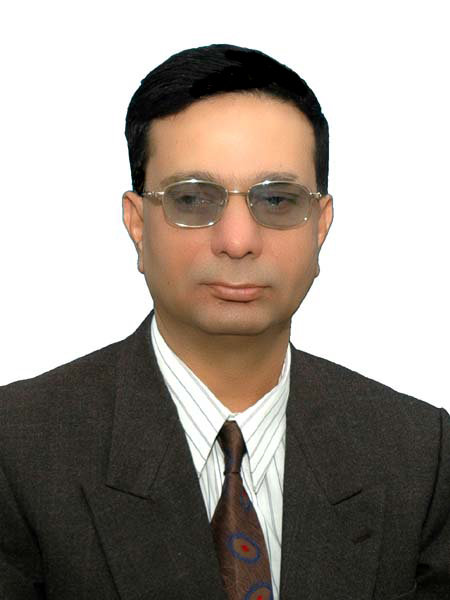
- Born: 27 March 1961 (age 65); Jauharabad, Punjab, Pakistan
- Education: Masters in Journalism from University of Punjab, Lahore, Pakistan
- Occupation: Journalist
- Notable credit: APNS Best Urdu Column Award Holder. Volunteer Work on PWDs
- Title: The First Blind Journalist of Pakistan, Columnist Nawaiwaqt, Chief Editor Akhbare Urdu
- Children: 2 Sons

Syed Sardar Ahmed Pirzada (Urdu: سید سردار احمد پیرزادہ; born 27 March 1961) is a Pakistani journalist, radio anchor, and socio-political analyst most prominently known as the First Blind Journalist of Pakistan. He is currently Chief Editor of Monthly Akhbar-e-Urdu and also writes columns for Urdu newspapers including Daily Nawaiwaqt. He has been recognized and awarded by many NGOs and prominent personalities of Pakistan including but not limited to the Former President of Pakistan, Mr. Asif Ali Zardari.

He was one of the key advocates of "The ICT Rights of Persons with Disability Act 2020" passed in the National Assembly of Pakistan and is still campaigning for equal opportunities and proper legislation for Persons with Disabilities in Pakistan.

== Personal life and early career ==
Syed Sardar Ahmed Pirzada was born in the city of Jauharabad, District Khushab, Pakistan in March 1961. He was partially sighted at birth but due to the progression of Glaucoma became visually impaired soon after. His education consisted of inclusive institutions that did not have any special facilities to accommodate Visually Impaired students. He earned his master's degree in journalism from the University of the Punjab, Lahore in 1985. Sardar Pirzada faced a lot of oppression and bias due to his impairment and people in his field of work refused to judge him on merit alone (by his own accounts).

Following his post graduation in journalism, Pirzada entered mainstream media and started working as reporter and sub editor for national dailies and weeklies including Daily Jang, Daily Jasarat, Daily Mashriq and Weekly Istaqlal. He has also worked as the editor of the English monthly entitled The Diplomat, a publication designed for the diplomatic community of Pakistan. Sometime in 1988 Sardar Ahmed Pirzada joined the government organization National Language Authority Of Pakistan (now NLPD, Ministry of Information, Broadcasting and National Heritage of Govt of Pakistan) as the Public Relations Officer. He became the editor of Monthly Akhbar-e-Urdu in 2003 and became Editor-in-Chief of the same in 2011. During this time has published a five-volume book series entitled Pakistan Mein Urdu (Urdu in Pakistan).

== Adopting the mantle of the First Blind Journalist of Pakistan ==
Pirzada has been active in mainstream Journalism before he graduated, his earliest works date back to 1985. Early in his career he faced oppression and lack of acceptance in mainstream journalism due to the fact that he was visually impaired. He adopted the mantle of the First Blind Journalist of Pakistan (TFBJP) sometime in 2007. According to his own accounts, the reason he adopted the title of "the First Blind Journalist of Pakistan" was to turn his only weakness (the stigma of being blind) into his strength. He joined the national Urdu daily of Pakistan, Nawaiwaqt in May 2007 and currently still writes as a columnist. Many other young visually impaired journalists have followed his role model into mainstream journalism. Following his role He started working as a Radio anchor in a socio-political talk show, "Sunrise key Mehman" on Sunrise FM 97 in August 2010. He left the Radio Station sometime in July 2013.

Pirzada has appeared on various political talk shows on television, including Capital Talk. His articles have gained recognition and prominence in the past few years and have been the cause of Suo Motto Notices by the Courts of Pakistan on social issues. His published analysis on the political scenarios of Pakistan were being monitored, translated and included in the surveillance revealed by the emails leaked by WikiLeaks on Stratfor.

=== Controversy and ban ===
In July 2010, a ban was placed on Sardar Pirzada by National Language Authority of Pakistan to not partake in any journalistic activities. This ban was met with widespread criticism by media community of Pakistan, with very prominent lobbies rallying to his side. This included the Pakistan Federal Union of Journalists (PFUJ) who strongly condemned the action in a Press Release to the Media, quoting the blatant violation of Pirzada's rights as under Article 19 of the Constitution of Pakistan. The ban was ultimately reversed under pressure from the Media.

== Notable achievements and work ==
Pirzada has received numerous awards and accolades for his writings, analysis and work in journalism.

=== APNS Best Column Award (Urdu) 2012 ===
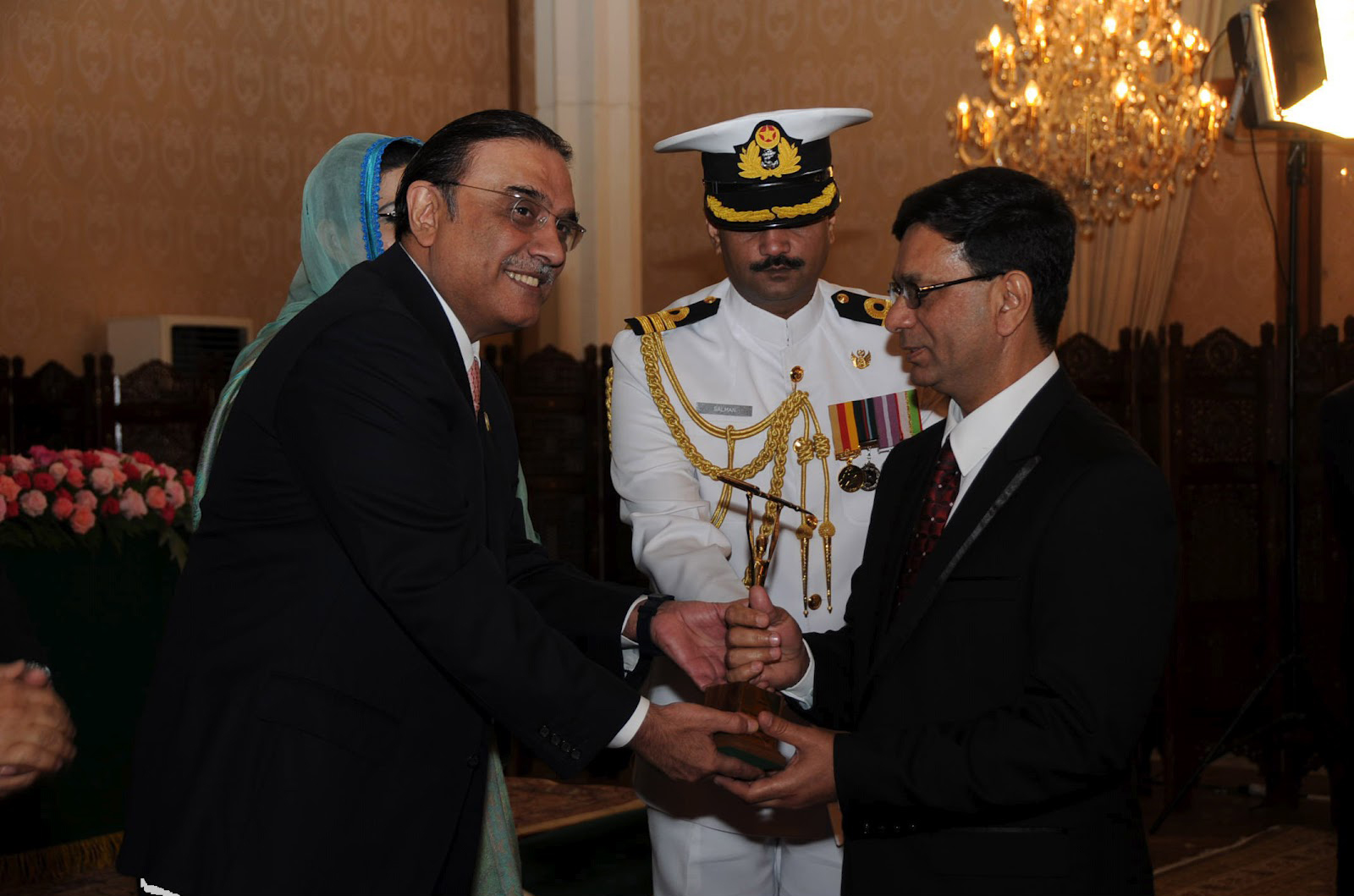
Syed Sardar Ahmed Pirzada receives the APNS 2012 award from (former) President of Pakistan, Asif Ali Zardari.

Pirzada was awarded the prestigious All Pakistan Newspaper Society Best Urdu Column Award for the year 2012. This award was conferred upon him by the now former President of Pakistan, Asif Ali Zardari at the 22nd Journalistic Awards Ceremony, Presidency of Pakistan.

=== Other awards ===
- NPC Gold Medal Award for Services in Journalism. Conferred by Dr. A. Q. Khan on behalf of Nazria Pakistan Council on 27 March 2013 .
- Cholistan Award 2012 for Services in Media. Conferred by Cholistan Development Council on 14 April 2012.
- Press Club Pakistan Lifetime Achievement Award and Honorary Lifetime Membership. Conferred by NPC President Farooq Faisal in Annual General Body meeting on 12 December 2013.

=== Work on PWDs and disability movement ===
Sardar has been working for the welfare of PWDs for several years on a completely voluntary basis. He has been striving for the representation of Persons With Disabilities in the Parliament and has made significant progress towards the same. He has been present in the assembly when resolutions based on his work were brought on the floor

In recognition of his services, Sardar was selected as the first recipient and gifted the first visual aid device brought to Pakistan by the Al-shifa Foundation of North America.

He has also helped in motivational programs in Pakistan (for disabled people) and has worked alongside many NGOs to rehabilitate PWDs and to spread awareness on the same. He has also drafted theories about PWDs and has presented them on more than one occasion. The more notable of these is the Disabled by Association theory.

He helped push for, and was the inaugurating speaker at, the first-ever Braille book corner in the National Library of Pakistan.

He was a key advocate for 'The ICT Rights of Persons with Disability Act 2020'. The Act, which was the first of its kind and designed to replace the Disabled Protection and Welfare Act of 1981 while contributing to the United Nations Convention on Rights of Persons with Disabilities (UNCRPD), was passed by the Ministry of Human Rights of Pakistan in February 2020.
