= Zaigham Zaidi =

Syed Zaigham Hussain Zaidi was a Pakistani photographer. He made his mark working with the Daily Jang in Rawalpindi and later with the Pakistan Times and daily Musawat. He was also the personal photographer of the late Zulfikar Ali Bhutto and Benazir Bhutto when they held the office of prime minister.

He migrated to Pakistan in 1947 from his home town of Muzaffarnagar in India's Uttar Pradesh state.

Zaidi was given the President's Pride of Performance award in 1991 for his contribution to photojournalism. Some of his best pictures related to the period of President Ayub Khan, Pakistan's 1965 war with India, the 1970 elections, Mr Bhutto's tenure as prime minister, the 1972 Shimla peace accord between Pakistan and India and the 1974 Islamic summit conference held in Lahore.

An exhibition of his photographs was organised in 2003 by the Pakistan National Council of the Arts.
