= Gul Ahmed =

Pakistani textile company

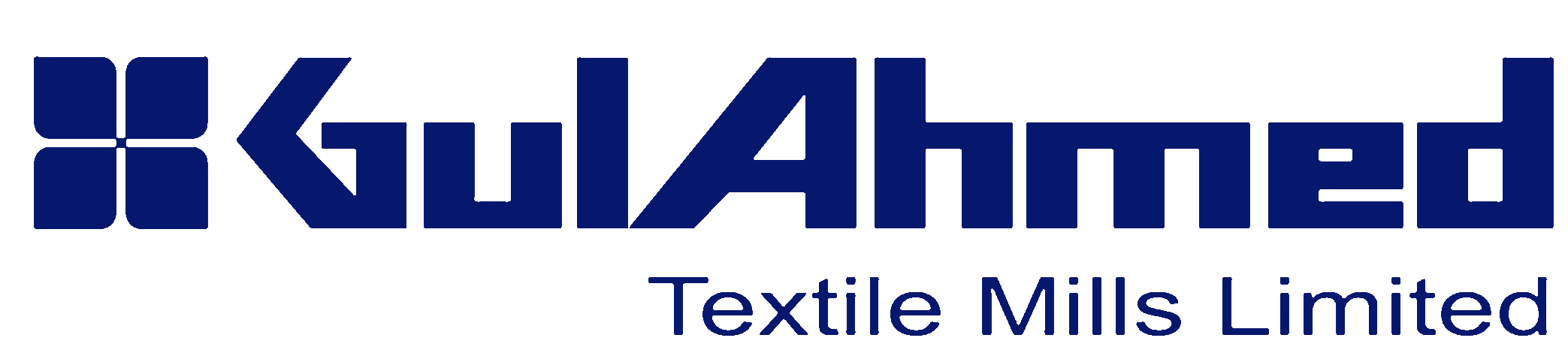

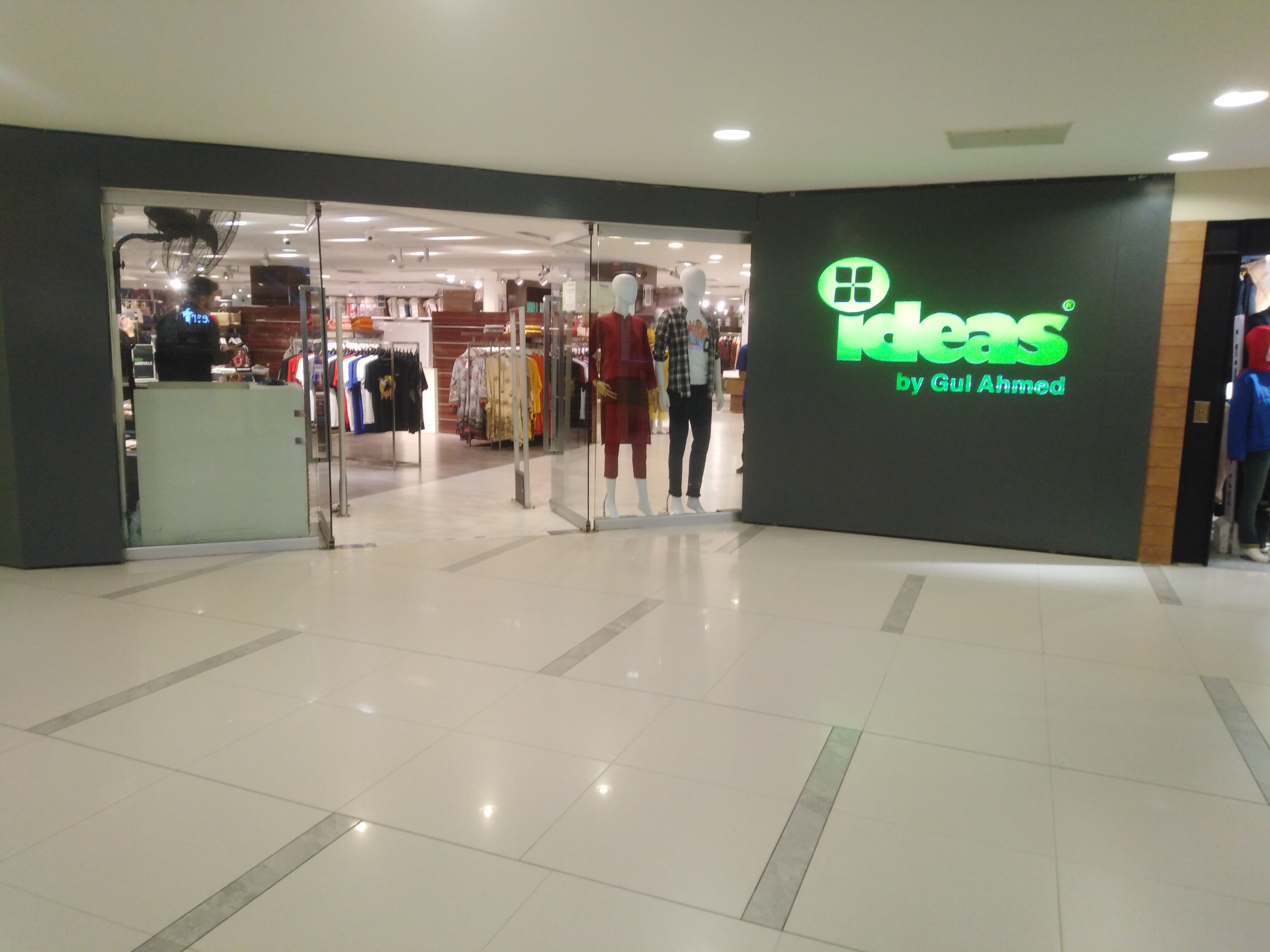
- A Gul Ahmed store in Dolmen Mall, Karachi
- Native name: گل احمد
- Type: Public
- Traded as: PSX: GATM
- Industry: Textile, Retail
- Founded: 1 April 1953
- Founder: Haji Bashir Ali Mohammad
- Headquarters: Landhi, Karachi-75160, Karachi, Pakistan
- Area served: Worldwide
- Products: Fabrics, bedding, yarn, apparel, accessories
- Revenue: ▲ Rs. 185.54 billion (US$660 million) - 2025
- Operating income: ▲ Rs. 11.75 billion (US$42 million) - 2025
- Net income: ▼ Rs. 4.45 billion (US$16 million) - 2025
- Total assets: ▲ Rs. 170.97 billion (US$610 million) - 2025
- Total equity: ▲ Rs. 52.09 billion (US$190 million) - 2025
- Number of employees: 15000
- Parent: Gul Ahmed Group
- Website: gulahmed.com

Gul Ahmed Textile Mills Limited (Urdu pronunciation: [ɡʊl ɑːˈɦ.məd] gull ah-MED) is a Pakistani textile company which manufactures and sells clothing through a chain of retail outlets under the name Ideas by Gul Ahmed.

== History ==
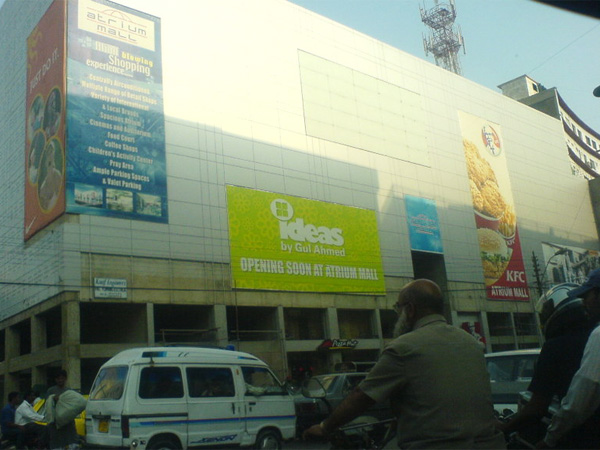
The Ideas retail outlet at the Atrium Mall on Zaibunnisa Street in Saddar, Karachi

Gul Ahmed began trading in textiles in the early 1900s.

In 1953, Gul Ahmed Textile Mills Limited was incorporated as a privately limited company, subsequently converted into public limited company on 7 January 1955. In 1970, it was listed on the Karachi Stock Exchange.

In 2003, Gul Ahmed expanded to the retail sector and founded Ideas by Gul Ahmed retail chain. It offers a range of home textiles and furnishings for the bedroom, kitchen and bathroom, as well as men's and women's apparel. It also provides in-house monogramming, embroidery and tailor-made services.

In 2025, Gul Ahmed Ideas launched largest flagship store and Ideas Cafe inside Dolmen Mall Clifton.
