= Mukhtar Ahmed Malik =

Pakistani politician

- مختار احمد ملک

Member-elect of the National Assembly of Pakistan
- Constituency: NA-82 Sargodha-I

Personal details
- Party: Pakistan Muslim League (N)

Mukhtar Ahmed Malik (Urdu: مختار احمد ملک) is a Pakistani politician who is currently a member of the National Assembly of Pakistan. He represents the constituency NA-82 Sargodha-I under the Pakistan Muslim League (N).

== Political career ==
Mukhtar won the NA-82 Sargodha-I constituency election under the Pakistan Muslim League (N) party. He defeated Nadeem Afzal Gondal of the Pakistan People's Party by a margin of more than 20,000 votes, and won 37.06% of the vote.
