= Khurram Zaki =

Pakistani journalist and activist (1976–2016)

Syed Khurram Zaki سید خرم ذکی
- Born: 26 March 1976
- Died: 7 May 2016 (aged 40); Karachi, Pakistan
- Cause of death: Shot by armed terrorist
- Occupations: Activist, journalist, blogger

Syed Khurram Zaki (26 March 1976 – 7 May 2016) was a Pakistani journalist and human rights activist. He was educated in Karachi, where he attended the National University of Computer and Emerging Sciences from 1998 to 2001.

Zaki, a Shia, was known for his opposition to religious extremism and banned terrorist organisations such as TTP, ASWJ, and LeJ.

== Professional career ==
=== Contact Plus ===
Zaki's professional career began in 2002 at Contact Plus, a BTL division of Interflow Communications. He worked in the Strategy Department as Activation Manager under the leadership of Syed Abdul Karim Tanveer.

=== TV One/News ONE ===
Zaki joined TV One in 2005 as Director/Producer in Current Affairs department working under Sajjad Mir, the former editor of Nawaiwaqt. He directed and produced "Sajjad Mir kay Sath", "Taboo", "Front Page" and many other current affairs and infotainment programs including hosting a number of religious shows himself like "Sirat e Mustaqeem" and "Deen Dialogue". Within two years of joining TV One/News ONE, Taher A. Khan asked him to head and lead the current affairs and infotainment department as Sajjad Mir left News One for Waqt News, Lahore. He also conducted a number of current affairs and political talk shows like "Front Page" and "Election Beat" focusing on Terrorism, Talibanization, Sectarianism and Security issues.

=== LUBPAK ===
Zaki was an editor for Let Us Build Pakistan, a blog aimed at supporting "a progressive, inclusive and democratic Pakistan." This blog was censored and blocked by PTA for viewers within Pakistan.

== Civil society activism ==
=== Sit-in outside CM house Karachi ===
Pakistani civil society which was mainly dormant after their last vocal and meaningful protest campaign during the lawyers movement, against Gen Musharraf, became revitalised and functional again in the aftermath of the APS attack, Peshawar. The Government of Pakistan announced a crackdown on all banned terrorist outfits and a "National Action Plan" was announced to counter and control the menace of growing religious extremism and terrorism in Pakistan. The Constitution of Pakistan was also amended with 21st amendment which specifically calls for military trial of terrorist groups, terrorists and organisations using the name of religion or a sect for carrying out their terrorist activities. A long-held moratorium on the death penalty was also lifted for quick execution of terrorists. But despite the fact that there was general consensus amongst Pakistanis from all walks of life for strict action against these banned terrorist groups, the government rather faltered and ditched the hopes by not taking any action whatsoever against terrorist outfits and even execution of terrorists from these banned outfits (ASWJ, LeJ, TTP) was subsequently and mysteriously stopped without giving any reason. Taking advantage of this situation the militant wing of banned terrorist outfit ASWJ struck once again in Shikarpur by attacking a Shia mosque during Friday prayers and congregation on 30 January 2015. Khurram Zaki announced a sit-in outside CM house Karachi and requested other civil society activists to join the same on 2 February 2015. Khurram Zaki had a brief scuffle and verbal exchange with police officials when, while leading the protest, he tried to enter the red-zone. Eventually after more than 30 hours of sit-in and continuous negotiations with government officials including Sharmila Farooqui, Rashid Rabbani and Waqar Mehdi, the government accepted the demands of the protestors and Sharmila Farooqui announced on Electronic media during a press conference that ASWJ is a terrorist outfit and the Sindh government would soon conduct a crack down on them according to the national action plan. This promise was never followed through on, though.

=== Arrest from outside CM house Karachi ===
Only a day after the government promise on media that they would rein in the activities of ASWJ, the banned outfit announced rallies on 5 February 2015 to support the Kashmir cause. Such rallies were not only against government promises but all the statutory laws of the land including Anti Terrorism Act, Protection of Pakistan Act and National Action Plan drafted and approved after APS attack. Getting news of the planned rallies by ASWJ, the civil society responded swiftly by announcing another sit-in outside CM house if the banned outfit was allowed to hold rallies. ASWJ not only took out rallies on the same day but also managed to enter the red-zone and hold their own sit-in there with police, rangers and other law enforcement agencies kept watching this blatant violation of the law under their own nose. As announced in press club, Khurram Zaki, Jibran Nasir, Noor e Maryam and other civil society activists reached CM from the other side (Karachi Club side) and started their protest against banned outfit and Sindh administration for not keeping up their promises. On the other side of CM House ASWJ was doing their own protest against Civil Society and Khurram Zaki. Police officials and district administration preferred to crack down on Civil Society activists instead of ASWJ and around 25 were arrested immediately for entering red zone including Khurram Zaki. These 25 were only released after huge masses and protestors started converging on police station demanding their immediate release. The episode of the arrest of civil society peaceful activists again showed and exposed the vulnerability and weakness of civil government and infrastructure in front of these banned "jihadi" outfits. Police couldn't arrest even one of the ASWJ terrorists from other side of the CM house.

=== Protest outside Lal Masjid Islamabad and arrest ===
On 16 December 2015, the first anniversary of Army Public School Peshawar massacre, Khuuram Zaki announced a Civil Society protest outside Lal Masjid Islamabad. District administration and security and intelligence apparatus tried to persuade him to change the location of protest citing intelligence reports and apprehensions that the protest may be targeted by terrorist outfits. A meeting with the district administration on the invitation of the DC Islamabad held same day. He reiterated that peaceful protests are constitutional right of every citizen and thus he and other civil society activists would continue with their planned protest. When he along with his wife, kids and other activists reached the Lal Masjid at the given time (2 pm) a heavy contingent of police was already deployed there to disperse the protesters. As soon as they started chanting slogans against Molvi Abdul Aziz, Taliban and Extremism, Deputy Superintendent of Police, supported by number of police constables, intervened and ordered the arrest of all the protesters. The protesters were holding Pakistani national flag at that time, chanting slogans against Molvi Abdul Aziz and banned outfits including Taliban. They were not disrupting any traffic or public order as such. Police constables grabbed Khurram Zaki and dragged him towards the police van. He continued to ask them for the reasons of arrest as they had not broken any law of the land. The news of the protest and arrest was telecasted on major news channels as "breaking news". Not only Khurram Zaki but his wife, 16-year-old daughter Mariam Fatima and many other women activists were also arrested from the scene and were taken to Abpara Police Station, Islamabad. They were only released after interior minister Ch. Nisar Ali Khan intervened and ordered to release them. Interior minister said that there was no reason to arrest the peaceful protesters. He also ordered the suspension of SHO and Show Cause notice was served to Superintendent of the Police, Islamabad. The arrests caused an uproar on social media and the issue of Lal Masjid and Molvi Abdul Aziz once again came in limelight with parliamentarians raising the issue in National Assembly. Renowned Civil Society activists and academicians Farzana Bari and Pervez Hoodbhoy were also part of this protest. Dr. Ayesha Siddiqa, former visiting scholar at the Johns Hopkins University has also written an article which provides theme of protests.

== Death ==
During the late hours of 7 May 2016, Zaki, while eating dinner at a restaurant in Sector-11B of North Karachi, was fatally shot by unknown assailants riding on two motorcycles. Zaki was killed, while a journalist, Khalid Rao, and a pedestrian, Aslam, were injured. Different organizations, including rights activists, staged protests and rallies against his murder. His funeral prayer was organized outside CM House and he was laid to rest in Wadi Hussain (A.S) graveyard Karachi.

=== Legacy ===
His son Ali Hyder Zaki, a teenager, following the agitation mode of his father has alone registered the protest lifting in his hands placard, against government inaction in front of Chief Minister House, Karachi. He demanded the Sindh chief minister to admonish the relevant police officers to reopen the murder case and bring the ASWJ terrorists to book.

== See also ==
- Human rights in Pakistan
- Targeted killings in Pakistan
