= Saleem Ullah Khan Niazi Paikhel =

Pakistani politician

Muhammad Saleem Ullah Khan Paikhel (born 25 May 1970 at Mianwali) is a Pakistani agriculturist and politician. He is a former member of the Provincial Assembly of the Punjab, elected on 17 March 1999.
