= Jassi Lailpuria =

Jassi Singh Lailpuria
- Birth name: Jasbir Singh
- Born: Faisalabad, Pakistan
- Genres: Pop, bhangra, rap
- Occupation(s): Singer, musician, writer
- Years active: 2009–present
- Website: Jassi Lailpuuria Official

Jassi Singh Lailpuria is a Pakistani singer-songwriter from Faisalabad. A Punjabi singer of pop and bhangra music, he is best known for his song Sohna Pakistan.

== Personal life and career ==
Jassi is from Faisalabad, Pakistan. He is married and is father of 3 kids. In 2009, Jassi Lailpuria, launched his first song on independence day entitled, Sohna Pakistan. Jassi also wrote an Urdu book on Shaheed Bhagat Singh. He performs in many shows and events all over Pakistan.

== Discography ==
Year	Title
2009	Sohna Pakistan
2012	Jatt da Truck
