= Salima Begum =

Pakistani teacher

- سلیمہ بیگم
- Born: Oshikhandass, Gilgit-Baltistan, Pakistan
- Education: Institute of Education, London (graduation); University of Punjab (B.S.Ed); Agha Khan University (M.Ed)
- Occupations: Teacher; trainer; educationist
- Years active: 1992–present
- Awards: Global Teacher Prize (finalist); World of Difference Award; The UK Alumni Award

Salima Begum is a Pakistani teacher and educationist from Gilgit-Baltistan, is the headteacher at the Government Elementary College for Women, Gilgit. She was a top 10 finalist for the Global Teacher Prize in 2017 and received the World of Difference Award in 2019.

== Early life and education ==
Salima was born in Oshikhandass, Gilgit-Baltistan, northern Pakistan. She received her early school education in her hometown. She obtained a degree for bachelor of science education (B.S.Ed) at the University of Punjab. She earned a master’s degree in education at the Institutes for Educational Development (IED), Agha Khan University, in 2002. Later, she did graduation from the Institute of Education, University of London.

== Career ==
Salima started her teaching career in 1992 as a primary teacher at a government elementary school for girls in Gilgit-Baltistan. Later in 1997, she initiated secondary science classes in the school.

She worked at the IED's Professional Development Centre, Northern Pakistan, where she supervised the implementation of a Whole School Improvement Program, a European Union (EU)-funded project aiming at improving school infrastructure, leadership, and management practices in five districts of Pakistan. In 2010, she also participated in implementing the Educational Development and Improvement Programme in Gilgit, which was sponsored by the AusAid. She has also contributed to the Teacher Education project launched by the USAID.

Salima has trained around 7,000 teachers in Gilgit-Baltistan and 8,000 more across Pakistan during the course of her career.

== Awards and honours ==
Year	Title	Result	Presented by	Ref.
2017	Global Teacher Prize	Nominated	Varkey Foundation	
2019	World of Difference Award (Education)	Won	International Alliance of Women	
2019	The UK Alumni Award	Won	British Council	
