= Allama Muhammad Bashir =

20th and 21st-century Islamic scholar

Muhammad Bashir
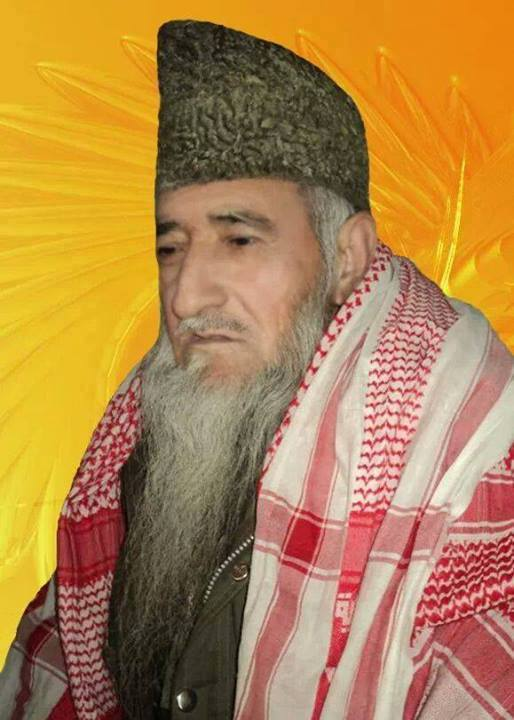
- Abu'l Irfan Allama Muhammad Bashir

Personal life
- Born: 24 September 1940
- Died: 17 March 2015.
- Era: Modern era
- Region: Asia
- Main interest(s): Aqeedah, Fiqh, Tasawwuf

Religious life
- Religion: Islam
- Jurisprudence: Sufism

Abu'l Irfan Allama Muhammad Bashir (Urdu: ابوالعرفان علامہ محمد بشیر; 24 September 1940 – 17 March 2015) was a religious scholar of Sofia Noorbakhsia (sect of Islam). He translated several Islamic books to Urdu. Dawat-e-Sofia and Alfiqa-tul-Ahwat are two main Noorbakhshi Books. He was born in Barrah a village in Ghanche District Gilgit-Baltistan Pakistan. He did basic schooling from his own village. Passed Matriculation from Khaplu Bala. He did his ARABI FAZIL from Wafaq ul Madaris Al-Arabia, Pakistan.
