= Sabia Abbat =

Pakistani professional cyclist

- Born: Haripur, Khyber Pakhtunkhwa.
- Education: Bachelor's in Physical Education
- Occupation: Professional cyclist

Sabia Abbat is a Pakistani professional cyclist.

== Background ==
Abbat was born in Haripur, Khyber Pakhtunkhwa and holds a bachelor's degree in physical education.

== Career ==
It was unusual in her hometown for women to participate in sports. However, Sabia was passionate about sports from an early age. In 2011, Sadia witnessed a women's cycling competition in Pania where the women were unable to ride a bike properly. This inspired Sabia to learn to ride a bicycle. Sadia took her uncle's bicycle to practice on. She was unable to ride it in the start and fell many times before she could finally ride it. Sabia travelled to Lahore for training because of lack of facilities in her native area. Sabia became the first woman from Hazara division to win the National Cycling Championship in 2013. She has also represented Pakistan at the Asian Games.
