= Naseer Khan Khosa =

Pakistani politician

Mir Naseer Khan Khosa was a Chhutani Khosa from Madadpur village in the Thul Sub Division of Jacobabad District. He was a well known politician and became a Member of Provincial Assembly (MPA) in 1997 for the first time and became Minister of Sindh. In 2002 he was elected as MPA for the second time. He had also been the advisor to chief minister and minister for food.

Mir Naseer Khan Khosa was born into the Chhutani Khosa family of Madadpur village in the Thul subdivision of Jacobabad District, Sindh. He belonged to a prominent tribal and political family that played an active role in the social and political affairs of upper Sindh. Throughout his life, he remained closely associated with the people of Jacobabad and surrounding rural areas.

Khosa entered mainstream politics in Sindh and emerged as a significant political figure in Jacobabad District. In the 1997 general elections, he was elected as a Member of the Provincial Assembly of Sindh from Jacobabad. Following his election, he served as a provincial minister in the Government of Sindh. He won the election as an independent candidate, defeating candidates from major political parties. In the 2002 general elections, Khosa was again elected as a Member of the Provincial Assembly from Jacobabad, representing the Pakistan Peoples Party (PPP). His second term further strengthened his position in regional politics and public affairs. During his years in politics, he was known for his influence in local governance, tribal affairs, and development issues concerning Jacobabad District and surrounding areas. He remained active in provincial politics for many years and maintained strong ties with his constituency.

He has four sons, Abdul Hafeez, Mahfuz-ur-Rehman, Anees-ur-Rehman and Muhammad Sadiq

Mir Naseer Khan Khosa is remembered as a prominent political leader of Jacobabad who represented the district in the Provincial Assembly of Sindh on multiple occasions. His political career spanned several decades, during which he contributed to provincial politics and local governance in upper Sindh.

He died on 24 December 2020, and is buried in his native village Mir Nawab Khan Khosa located in Jacobabad.
