= Muhammad Waqas Khan =

Pakistani politician

Muhammad Waqas

Member of the Provincial Assembly of Punjab
- In office 25 November 2002 – 2007
- Constituency: PP-8 Wah Cantt

Personal details
- Born: 6 May 1969 (age 56) Rawalpindi, Pakistan
- Party: Jamaat-e-Islami Pakistan
- Education: Masters in Political Science
- Alma mater: University of Punjab, University of Peshawar (1994)
- Occupation: Politician
- Known for: Author of two books and several booklets

Muhammad Waqas (born 6 May 1969) is a Pakistani politician who is a member of the Jamaat e Islami party.

== Education and early life ==
Waqas was born on 6 May 1969 at Rawalpindi. His forefathers belong to Khyber Pakhtunkhwa's district Swabi. His father Dr. Muhammad Kamal (Vice Ameer JI) was the Central President of Islami Jamiat Talaba. His grandfather Khan Jan Muhammad was a close companion of Maulana Syed Abul Ala Maudoodi. During his teenage Khan shifted to Wah Cantt with his family. He passed his Matric From FG Model High school Wah Cantt and intermediate (FSc) from Govt College St Town Rawalpindi. He is a graduate of Punjab University. He earned his master's degree in political science from University of Peshawar in 1994.

== Political career ==
He won during the by-election of Punjab Assembly, and was an elected member of the Provincial Assembly of Punjab, PP-8 (Rawalpindi-VIII) Wah Cantt. He is also Ameer Jamaat-e-Islami Taxila and president of the JI political committee Punjab North.

== Literature ==
Waqas has written wrote two books and several booklets, including Ar Rooh War reihan (Seerat un Nabi) and Islami Falahi Riyasat (Islamic Welfare State).
