= Fiza Farhan =

Pakistani social entrepreneur

- Born: 18-October-1986; Lahore
- Education: Warwick Business School; Lahore University of Management Sciences; Harvard Business School
- Occupations: Global Strategic Development Advisor, Member UN Secretary High Level Panel on Women Empowerment, Member Chief Minister's Task-force on International Donor Relations
- Organization: ORA Global Advisors
- Known for: Advocacy, influence
- Website: https://ora-gda.com/

Fiza Farhan is a Pakistani social entrepreneur and activist.

She is the co-founder of the Buksh Foundation and founder of ORA Global Advisors. She is a member of the UN Secretary-General's panel on Women's Economic Empowerment. She is also known for microfinance and energy project schemes.

== Career ==
Fiza Farhan started her career in 2008. She led the social enterprise Buksh Foundation as one of the youngest CEOs in the sector.

She has also served as a director of Buksh Energy Limited, where she launched Pakistan’s first ESCO (energy service company) and worked on developing green financing consortiums for the private and public sectors. She has worked with the Government of Pakistan to develop policies on renewable energy.

She was the fourth Pakistani to appear on the Forbes 30 Under 30 List of Social Entrepreneurs and the first Pakistani to become a future energy leader at the World Energy Council.

In 2016, the UN Secretary-General appointed Fiza Farhan as a member of his first-ever high-level panel on women's economic empowerment amidst global leadership. In the same year she was appointed as the chairperson to Chief Minister Punjab’s task force on women empowerment in Punjab. She then left Buksh to work as an independent global strategic development advisor. Her work includes women's empowerment, climate change, energy access, sustainable growth, youth & education, and multi-sectorial partnerships.

In 2018 she launched Champions of Change Coalition, Pakistan Group as Convenor. Champions of Change Coalition is a globally recognized Australian best practice model for advancing gender equality.

In April, 2025 she won Global 40 under 40 award

Farhan wrote a memoir, 52 Pearls of Life, which was published in 2016. The book details her thoughts and her success as an activist.

== Accolades ==
• Winner of “TIAW World of Difference Awards” at Royal Automobile Club of Australia on October 18, 2019

• Selected in the Forbes Asia, “30 Under 30 List of Social Entrepreneurs” for 2016

• Winner of the Education UK Alumni Awards, 2016 in the “Social Impact” Category

• Received a complimentary membership for the Clinton Global Initiative 2015

• Received “Poverty Alleviation Award” at the Asian Corporate Social Responsibility Forum, 2015 - Bangkok, Thailand

• Featured as “Chand Sitara: Heroes of Pakistan” in the national song made by PEPSI Pakistan with the title “Chamke Hum se Pakistan” on August 14, 2015

• Selected in US Magazine “FORBES 30 Under 30 Social Entrepreneurs 2015 List”

== Personal life ==
Farhan is married with one child.
