= Zahida Kazmi =

- زاہدہ کاظمی
- Born: 1959 (age 66–67); Peshawar, Khyber Pakhtunkhwa, Pakistan
- Years active: 1992–present
- Organization: All Pakistan Yellow Cab Federation
- Known for: Being Pakistan's first female taxi driver
- Children: 7

Zahida Kazmi (Urdu: زاہدہ کاظمی) is a Pakistani woman known for being the country's first female taxi driver. Primarily operating in the Islamabad–Rawalpindi metropolitan area, she has also driven customers to rocky, remote areas in the northern part of the country, such as Balakot, Chitral, Dir, Abbottabad, and Swat District. She has gained recognition for breaking gender stereotypes in the country.

== Early life ==
Kazmi was born in Peshawar to a Pashtun family. She married at the age of 13, after which she moved from Abbottabad to Karachi in 1972 owing to her husband's job with the Pakistan Navy. Her husband was a taxi driver himself, and had taught her how to drive. He became a prisoner of war during the Indo-Pakistani war of 1971, and was released some time later.

Following the death of her husband in 1981, Kazmi first worked as a domestic helper, before taking up a job at a cloth factory, to support her six children (four daughters and two sons) as a single mother. However, the deteriorating law and order condition in the city forced her to relocate to Rawalpindi.

== Career ==
Kazmi started her career in 1992 by renting a taxi and searching for customers at the Benazir Bhutto International Airport, keeping a gun in her car for safety reasons. She then used to earn around Rs. 200 to 300 per day, driving within the limits of the city.

In 1992, at the age of 33, she capitalized on the government's Yellow Cab Scheme, that allowed her to buy her own taxi at affordable instalments. She also served as chairperson of the All Pakistan Yellow Cab Federation for 12 years. Her fluency in Pashto enabled her to take her customers to rural areas in the northern areas of the country such as the North and South Waziristan Districts. She continued her career after remarrying in 1995 when her children had completed their education. She had one daughter from her second marriage.

In 2015, she suffered from a brain hemorrhage which, compounded with her high blood pressure and diabetes, affected her physical ability to travel long distances regularly. She did not own the taxi she used to drive then, and sold her car to cover her medical expenses. She then decided to transport schoolchildren. A Facebook page was created in September 2015 to collect donations to buy her a van. The donation target was reached after a few months, after which she received her van in May 2016. She limited herself to driving schoolchildren.

== Recognition ==
In 2011, BBC News covered her life story in an article, that led to greater coverage in both national and international media.

In 2014, she was the subject of the documentary Madam Kazmi and the drivers by Romanian documentary filmmaker Anca Dimofte. It was showcased at the SOAS University of London.

In 2015, Kazmi was honored by Coca-Cola Beverages Pakistan Limited (CCBPL) and UN Women at their annual Savvy and Successful ceremony for breaking stereotypes in the country.
