= Chaudhry Muhammad Sharif =

- چوہدری محمد شریف
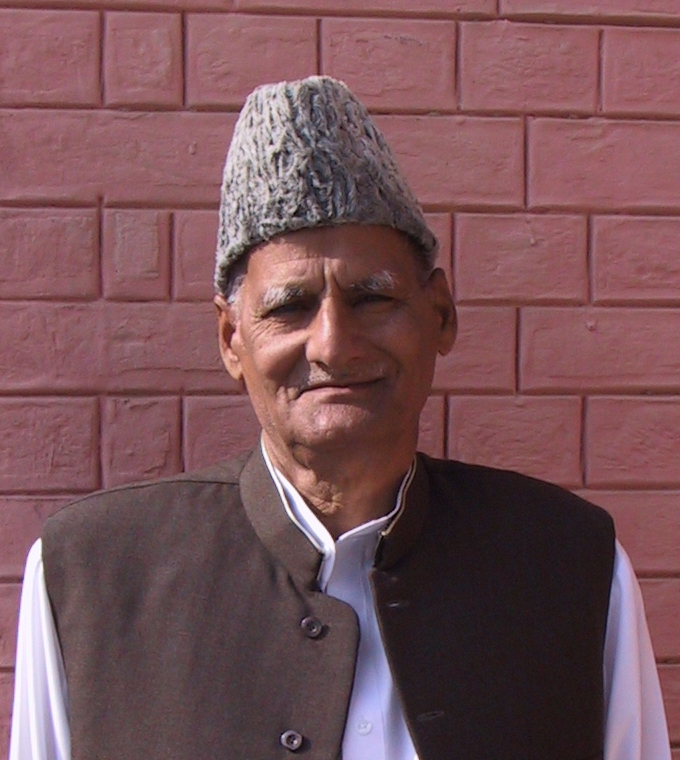
- Sharif at his residence in Bahawalpur, Pakistan

Justice of the Lahore High Court of Pakistan
- In office 2 November 1981 – 10 March 1990

Personal details
- Born: March 10, 1928 Hoshiarpur
- Died: June 29, 2009 (aged 81) Bahawalpur
- Education: University of Punjab Law College, Lahore

Justice Chaudhry Muhammad Sharif (جسٹس چوہدری محمد شریف) (March 10, 1928 – June 29, 2009) was a prominent judge of the Lahore High Court in Pakistan.

== Early life ==
Justice Sharif was born in a village near Hoshiarpur district (East Punjab) on March 10, 1928. At the time of partition of India, he was a student in the Government College Hoshiarpur. After migrating to Pakistan, he completed his education from SE College in Bahawalpur and the University of Punjab's Law College in Lahore.

== Judicial career ==
After a short phase as a practicing lawyer, he started his career in judiciary as Civil Judge on March 23, 1953, by taking charge in Chakwal. Having served as the District and Session's Judge in Punjab from 1970 to 1980, he took oath as judge of the Lahore High Court on the November 2, 1981, and retired from the High Court on March 10, 1990. Due to his spotless record of dauntless honesty, he was requested by the government to rejoin as a judge of the Special Court for Speedy Trials in Multan where he served till 1994.

During his career as a judge, Justice Sharif dealt with the murder case of the former Chief Minister Ghulam Haider Wayne.

He was five times awarded the All Punjab Certificate for giving judgment on maximum number of court cases.

== Later years ==
Justice Sharif lived a simple and disciplined life as a devoted Muslim. He was very fond of Iqbal's philosophy of self-esteem and faith. He remained an ardent swimmer, athlete and won several local tennis championships as a keen tennis player. He died on June 29, 2009, and is buried in Bahawalpur where he lived most of his later years in life. Justice Sharif was survived by his widow, two sons and two daughters. His autobiography is in final phases of being edited for publication.
