= Makhdoom Zada Muhammad Aftab Haider =

Pakistani politician

Member of the Provincial Assembly of Khyber Pakhtunkhwa
- Incumbent
- Assumed office 29 February 2024
- Constituency: PK-111 Dera Ismail Khan-I

Personal details
- Born: Dera Ismail Khan District, Khyber Pakhtunkhwa, Pakistan
- Party: Jamiat Ulema-e-Islam (F)
- Spouse: Syeda Faryal Ambreen Naqvi Al Bukhari
- Children: 2

Makhdoom Zada Muhammad Aftab Haider is a Pakistani politician representing PK-111, Paharpur Tehsil, in the Dera Ismail Khan District. He has been a member of the Provincial Assembly of Khyber Pakhtunkhwa since February 2024. As a provincial parliamentarian, he serves as a member of the Standing Committee on Home and Tribal Affairs, the Standing Committee on Higher Education, Archives, and Libraries, the Standing Committee on Agriculture, and the Public Accounts Committee.

Haider hails from a Sufi lineage in Uch Bilot Sharif and is a descendant of Hazrat Peer Shah Essa, a renowned Sufi scholar and historian. His ancestral lineage also traces back to Hazrat Jalal Ud Din Surkh Posh Naqvi Al-Bukhari of Uch Sharif, Bahawalpur.

Haider's father, Makhdoom Syed Murid Kazim Shah, held the assembly seat multiple times and served as Minister for Revenue and Excise and was the Parliamentary leader in Khyber Pakhtunkhwa.

== Career ==
Haider contested the 2024 general elections as a candidate of Jamiat Ulema-e-Islam (F) from PK-111 Dera Ismail Khan-I, securing victory over his closest competitor, Ehtesham Javed Akber Khan of Pakistan Tehreek-e-Insaf Parliamentarians (PTI-P).
