= Amjad Pervaiz =

Pakistani lawyer

Muhammad Amjad Pervaiz

Advocate General Punjab
- In office March 2025 – Permanent
- Appointed by: Governor of the Punjab
- Preceded by: Khalid Ishaq

Personal details
- Education: University of the Punjab Lahore

Muhammad Amjad Pervaiz (in Urdu محمد امجد پرویز) is a Pakistani lawyer serving as the Advocate General Punjab. He is also chairman of the Punjab Bar Council and life member of the Supreme Court Bar Association of Pakistan. Earlier he was a busy lawyer of NAB National Accountability Bureau where he was conducting the trials of Shahbaz Sharif, present Prime Minister of Pakistan, Maryam Nawaz Sharif, present Chief Minister of Punjab and Moonis Elahi opposition leader.

== Biography ==
Pervaiz born and grew up in Pakistan, after early education he graduated from University of the Punjab, and then Punjab University Law College, earning an LL.B. He joined the legal profession in 2000 as an associate of Dr. Basit law firm. He became a criminal trial lawyer and conducted a large number of trials including of many prominent political leaders of Pakistan. He declined to become a Judge of the Lahore High Court.

== Advocate General of Punjab ==
The governor of Punjab appointed him Advocate General of Punjab, representing the government of Punjab in Lahore High Court and the Supreme Court of Pakistan. He is the principal law officer and chief prosecutor of the Punjab Government and ex-officio chairman of Punjab Bar Council.
