= Shiza Shahid =

Pakistani entrepreneur

- Born: Islamabad, Pakistan
- Education: Stanford University
- Occupations: Entrepreneur, Investor, Educator
- Employer: Our Place
- Organization: Malala Fund
- Known for: Co-founder, Former CEO, Malala Fund; Co-founder, Co-CEO, Our Place
- Spouse: Amir Tehrani

Shiza Shahid is a Pakistani entrepreneur, social activist, investor, and educator. She is the co-founder and former CEO of the non-profit Malala Fund, which promotes education for every girl, as well as the co-founder and co-CEO of Our Place, a direct-to-consumer brand of cookware. In 2013, she was included in Time's "30 Under 30" list of world change-makers, and in 2014, she was listed in Forbes's "30 Under 30" list of global social entrepreneurs. She is also well-known as mentor of Nobel Peace Prize laureate Malala Yousafzai.

== Early life ==
Shiza Shahid was born and raised in Islamabad, the capital of Pakistan. She spent her early teen years as a volunteer worker and as an activist. At the age of 14 she started working in prisons occupied by women who were convicted of various crimes. She worked as a volunteer at a relief camp following a deadly earthquake which struck Kashmir in 2005, killing nearly 85,000 people.

== Career ==
At the age of 18, Shahid received a scholarship to pursue higher studies at Stanford University and graduated in 2011. She returned to Pakistan in 2009 after hearing about the Taliban's ban against women's education. After completing her higher studies in 2011, she pursued a career as a business analyst at McKinsey & Company's office in Dubai. In 2017, she co-founded NOW Ventures, which focuses on funding startups.

Shahid has also given lectures and speeches in universities in different countries on the subjects of women's empowerment and the importance of child education.

=== Collaboration with Malala ===
While pursuing her higher studies at Stanford University, Shahid reportedly watched a YouTube video of young Malala Yousafzai, who was ambitious and keen on empowering women and child education in Pakistan. She reached out to Malala's father Ziauddin and offered to assist Malala to achieve her dreams.

Shahid flew to Birmingham, where Yousafzai was hospitalized after being shot by Taliban members, to offer assistance to Yousafzai and her family to help them recover. Shahid and Malala co-founded the Malala Fund in 2013 with the aim of creating access to safe and high-quality education among girls in Pakistan and the African countries of Nigeria, Kenya, and Sierra Leone.

=== Our Place ===
Along with her husband, Amir Tehrani, and friend Zach Rosner, Shahid launched Our Place, a direct-to-consumer brand of cookware, in 2019. Our Place is known for the Always Pan, a piece of cookware sold in various pastel colors and primarily marketed via social media.
