= Huma Mulji =

Pakistani contemporary artist

- Born: 1970 (age 55–56); Karachi, Pakistan
- Occupation: Visual artist
- Website: humamulji.com

Huma Mulji (born 1970) is a Pakistani contemporary artist. Her works are in the collections of the Saatchi Gallery, London and the Asia Society Museum.

== Early life and education ==
Huma Mulji was born in 1970 in Karachi, Pakistan. In 1995, she completed a BFA at the Indus Valley School of Art and Architecture in Karachi, and in 2010, received an MFA from Transart Institute in Berlin, Germany.

== Career ==
From 2003 to 2015, she was an associate professor at the School of Visual Arts, Beaconhouse National University in Lahore, Pakistan. In 2016, she was a fellow at the Terra Foundation for American Art. She was Visiting Artist at the Goldsmiths' College, London, UK in 2015 to 2017. In 2017, Mulji received the Nigaah Art Award.

She is currently Lecturer at the University of West of England, Bristol, UK, and Lecturer, BA (Hons) Fine Art, at the Plymouth College of Art, UK.

== Works ==
Mulji's artworks were exhibited at Art Dubai in UAE, 10th Gwangju Biennale in Gwangju, South Korea, 56th Venice Biennale in Italy, Karachi Biennale 2017, in Barcelona Museum of Contemporary Art in Spain, Asia Society Museum in New York, Saatchi Gallery in UK and Project 88 in Mumbai, India. Her solo exhibitions include High Rise, in Elementa Gallery, Dubai, UAE in 2009, Crystal Pallace and Other Follies in Rothas Gallery, Lahore, Pakistan in 2010, Twilight in Project 88, Mumbai, India in 2011, and A Country of Last Things in Koel Gallery, Karachi, Pakistan in 2016.

Mulji's work examines the relationship between culture, context, and cognition. Drawing on the visual culture of her South Asian heritage, she explores the politics of place, addressing themes of existence and the habitual perception of one's surroundings. This intermediary state is continuously played out in Mulji's work, which incorporates sculpture, painting, photography, and installation. The city, the everyday, and the overlooked serve as primary subjects in these artworks, which are often described as deliberately awkward.

Her sculptural installation Arabian Delight (2008) refers to the aspects of economic migration, to the anticipations of the migrants and corresponding reality. The piece consists of a taxidermy camel stuffed into a suitcase and addresses also the Arabization of Pakistan. It was presented at Art Dubai in 2008, but was removed after a few days to avoid a controversial topic. The removal, however, brought even more publicity to the artwork. The piece was bought by Charles Saatchi and became part of the collection of the Saatchi Gallery.

The title of her installation Ode to a Lamppost That Got Accidentally Destroyed in the Enthusiastic Widening of Canal Bank Road (2011–2017), exhibited at the Karachi Biennale 2017 (at Pioneer Book Store), refers to a central road in Lahore where Mulji lived. Its widening caused protests. This artwork comments heavy development that becomes obsolete when the priorities shift. During the Biennale, this work raised controversy. Mulji placed the pole so that it was difficult to navigate in the space. Aziz Sohail noted that it was Mulji's point to make a parallel to social inequality and to how the life of people is affected during the developmental projects. Hamna Zubair wrote:

In this way, the lamppost at Pioneer Book Store may just turn out to be the most authentic work at KB17, in that it organically sparked a much-need conversation about the privilege and social stratification the art world must navigate.

== Bibliography ==
- Chiu, Melissa; Genoschio, Benjamin (2010). Contemporary Asian Art. London: Thames & Hudson. ISBN 978-0-500-23874-5. OCLC 901248255.
- Baler, Pablo (2013). The next thing : art in the twenty-first century. Madison: Fairleigh Dickinson University Press. ISBN 978-1-61147-451-0. OCLC 828884554.
