= Hamd =

Arabic word praising God

- Arabic: حمد
- Romanization: ḥamd
- Literal meaning: "praise"

Hamd (Arabic: حمد, romanized: ḥamd, lit. 'praise') is a word that exclusively praises God - whether written or spoken. Thus, The word "Hamd" is always followed by the name of God (Allah) - a phrase known as the Tahmid - "al-ḥamdu li-llāh" (Arabic: الحَمْد لله) (English: "praise be to God"). The word "Hamd" comes from the Qur'an, and الحَمْد لله is the epithet or locution which, after the Bismillah, establishes the first verse of the first chapter of the Qur'an - al Fatiha Mubarak (the opening).

A Hamd is usually written in Arabic, Persian, Turkish, Bengali, Punjabi, or Urdu and recited all over the Muslim world, from Indonesia to Morocco. A Qawwali performance usually includes at least one Hamd, which is traditionally at the beginning of the performance.

== In the five pillars of Islam ==
In the five pillars of Islam, the concept of Hamd is in each pillar to emphasize the importance of this word. In the first pillar Shahada, Muslims praise Allah for the blessings of being born Muslim and the belief in one god and his prophet. They also praise Him for giving them better health and wealth than those who suffer. The second pillar is Salat which is performing prayer, Muslims pray five times a day in order to keep remembering Allah and this allows a direct link between the worshipper and God. In each prayer Muslims recite Surah (passage), Al-Fatiha and choose the next surah they would like to recite, but Al-Fatiha must always be recited in order for prayers to be accepted. The third pillar is giving Zakat which is the act of giving a percentage of a Muslim's income to certain classes of needy people; this allows Muslims to remember the poor and to never forget that everything belongs to Allah. Therefore they should be thankful for what they have at all times. Fasting is the fourth pillar, and this emphasizes the depth meaning of Hamd in the holy month of Ramadan. Muslims fast every year for a month from dawn to sunset. This helps purify the worshiper's soul and helps them gain true sympathy with the hungry in addition to remind them of their blessings and amounts of food they have. The fifth pillar is Hajj, the pilgrimage to Mecca, the concept of Hamd is implemented in the action of Muslims visiting the Kaabah or House of God. In all five pillars in Islam, Hamd is used either by action or words. In all aspects of Islam, Hamd is used and can only be used for Allah alone. Hamd is the root word for AlHamdulillah which means praise to Allah. When a Muslim thanks or praises Allah for His favours and bounties it can be done by reciting the word or by act of prayer.

== Remembrance of God ==
Hamd is a word to be recited by every Muslim in order for him/her to keep Allah in mind. For example, when a Muslim sneezes, first thing they should say is HamdAllah praising God in every small or large situation. It is believed when a person sneezes, his or her soul is taken out for milliseconds and returned, therefore thanking Allah for returning the soul is a blessing. Muslims should always praise God no matter what state they are in. Hamd is always true and implies admiration, love and magnifying the creator. Hamd is sincere and true praise therefore when praising Allah most deserving; called Mahmood which comes from the word Hamd. When Muslims say AlHamdAllah, it is out of love, humility and complete submission to the oneness and perfection of Allah.

== Hamd singers ==
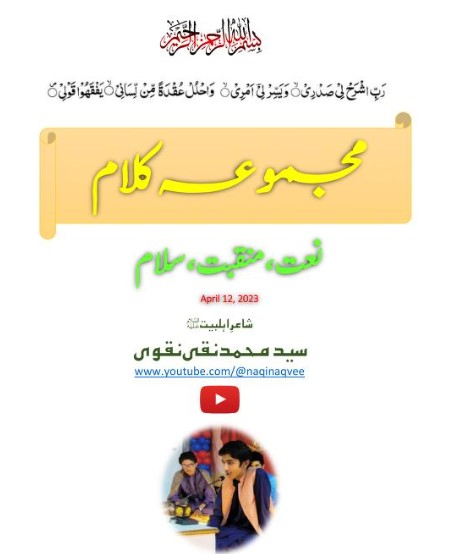
Hamd written by Muhammad Naqi Naqvi

Some well-known Hamd singers are Mishary Rashid Alafasy, Nusrat Fateh Ali Khan, the Sabri Brothers, Najam Sheraz, Qari Waheed Zafar Qasmi and Muhammad al-Muqit. Some modern English language singers of Hamd are Yusuf Islam (formerly known as Cat Stevens), Sami Yusuf, Ahmed Mac and Nusrullah Khan Noori. Hamd is a word that is used in the Islamic religion. Muslims use the word Hamd in many aspects in their lives. The Quran starts with a Hamd opening chapter or Surah which is Al-Fatiha starts with praising God ("Allah"). It is found to be in the first Ayah, the first Surah in the Quran; Al-Fatiha. It is significant because it allows Muslims to remember ("Allah") throughout the day and to keep praising Him for his blessings.

== See also ==
- Durood
- Haḍra
- Madih nabawi
- Mawlid
- Mehfil
- Na'at
- Qawwali
- Yaqazeh

=== Five Pillars of Islam ===
- Tawheed
- Salat
- Fasting
- Hajj
- Zakat
- Arabic music
- Arabic poetry
- Islamic music
- Islamic poetry
- Sufi music
- Sufi poetry
- Ya Muhammad
