= Thar Desert =

Arid region in India and Pakistan

Thar Desert Great Indian Desert
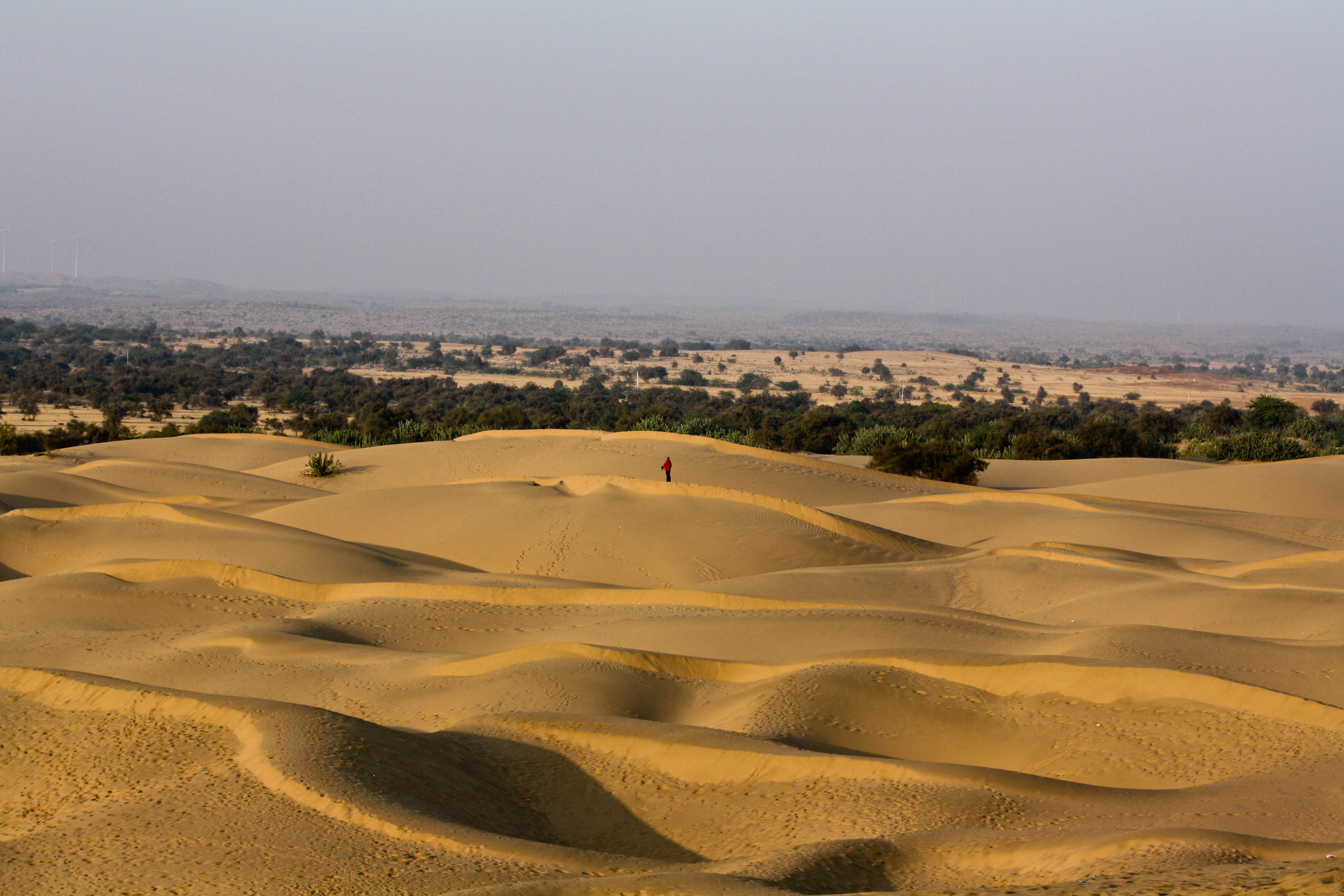
- The Thar Desert in Rajasthan, India

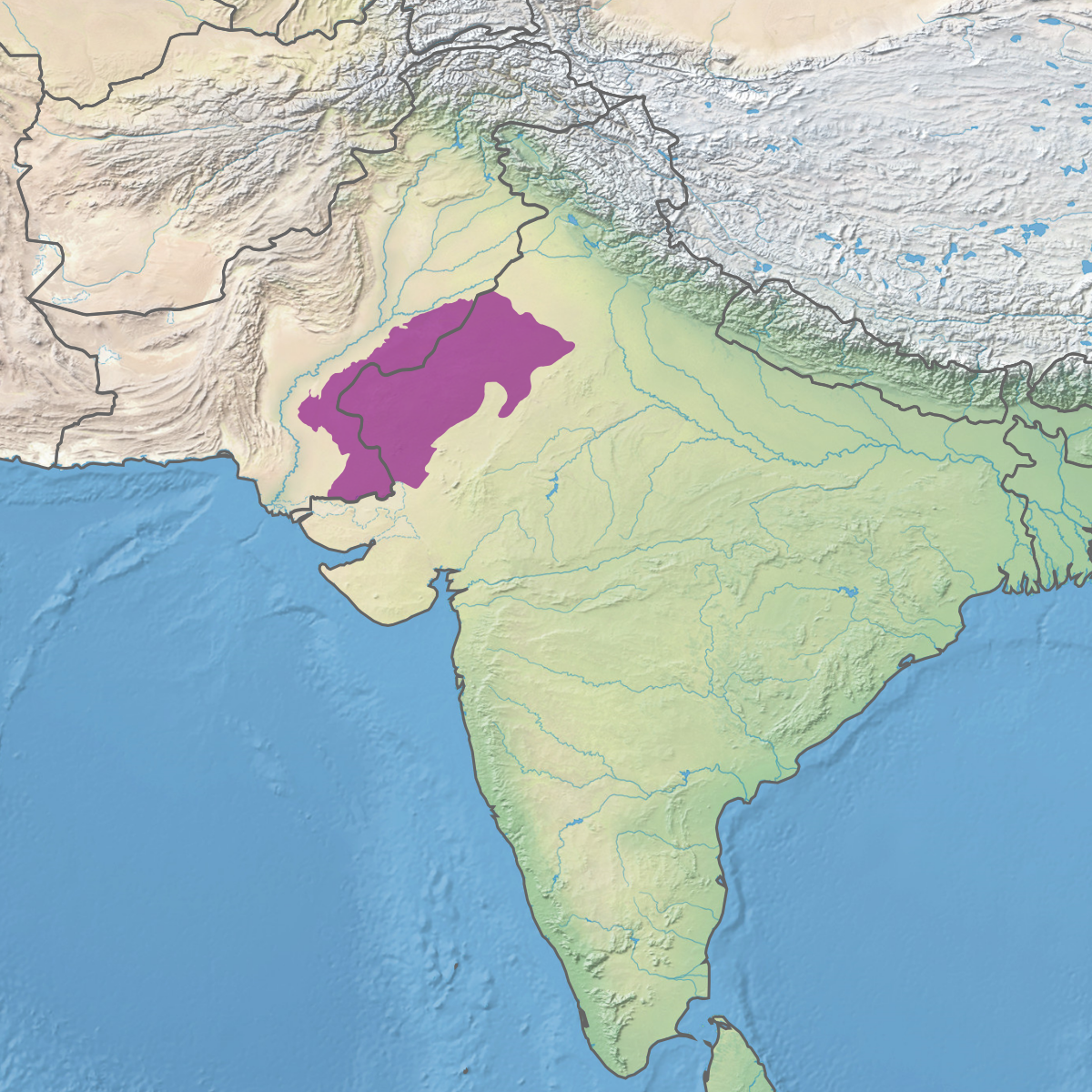
- A map of the Thar Desert ecoregion

Ecology
- Realm: Indomalayan
- Biome: Deserts and xeric shrublands
- Borders: Northwestern thorn scrub forests; Rann of Kutch salt marsh

Geography
- Area: 264,091 km^{2} (101,966 mi^{2})
- Countries: India; Pakistan
- States of India and provinces of Pakistan: India: Rajasthan; Gujarat; Haryana; Punjab; Pakistan: Punjab; Sindh
- Coordinates: 27°N 71°E
- Climate type: Desert

Conservation
- Conservation status: Vulnerable
- Protected: 41,833 km^{2} (15.8%)

The Thar Desert (Rajasthani pronunciation: [t̪ʰaːɾ]), also known as the Great Indian Desert, is an arid region in the north-western part of the Indian subcontinent stretching across India and Pakistan. Covering an area of 264,091 km^{2} (101,966 sq mi), it is one of the largest subtropical deserts in Asia by area. About two-thirds of the desert area lies in India, with the remainder in Pakistan. It forms about six percent of the geographical area of India, with the majority of the desert lying in the state of Rajasthan, with portions extending into Gujarat, Haryana, and Punjab. Towards the west, it extends into the provinces of Sindh and Punjab in Pakistan. It is bordered by the Indo-Gangetic Plain to the north, west and northeast, Rann of Kutch to the south, and the Aravalli Range to the east.

During the Last Glacial Maximum, an ice sheet covered the Tibetan Plateau, which reflected more solar radiation into space, resulting in cooling the overlying atmosphere during that period. Without the thermal low pressure caused by the heating, there was no monsoon over the Indian subcontinent, which led to the deposition of dust and the desertification of the region. The upliftment of the Aravallis brought about changes in the hydrography of the region, and the Ghaggar-Hakra River system that fed the region dried up, and the region became increasingly arid. Over the years, wind blown sediments and sand from the alluvial plains and the coast accumulated in the region.

The topography consists of sandy plains intercepted by eroded hills of low elevation. The region has a tropical desert climate with extremely hot summers and cooler winters. Majority of the rainfall is received from the southwest monsoon, which on average is less than 500 mm (20 in) annually. The rainfall varies over the years, often with large spells of drought. There are very few sources of water, with the inland Luni River system being the only major river system in the region. Rain water is often stored in natural and man-made reservoirs for use in the dry season.

The natural vegetation of the region is composed of trees, thorny scrubs and scattered grasslands. The desert is home to several animal and bird species. The Thar Desert is one of the most widely populated deserts in the world, with the Thar people inhabiting the area. The population is clustered into small villages, with majority of them nomadic in nature. Limited agriculture, herding of animals, and ecotourism drive the economy of the region.

== Geography ==
The Thar Desert is located in the north-western part of the Indian subcontinent stretching across the border between India and Pakistan, and is the eastern most extension of the Sahara–Arabian desert formation. It is spread across an area of 264,091 km^{2} (101,966 sq mi), with 195,091 km^{2} (75,325 sq mi) of the desert area lying in India, with the remaining in Pakistan. The desert forms about six percent of the geographical area of India, with the majority of the desert lying in the state of Rajasthan, with portions extending into Gujarat, Haryana, and Punjab.

Towards the west, it extends into the provinces of Sindh and Punjab in Pakistan. The northeastern part of the Thar Desert lies between the Aravalli Hills, which separates the same from the Central highlands and the Indo-Gangetic Plain to the east. The desert stretches from the alluvial plains of the Indus River in the west and northwest, to the Great Rann of Kutch in the south.

== Origin and formation ==
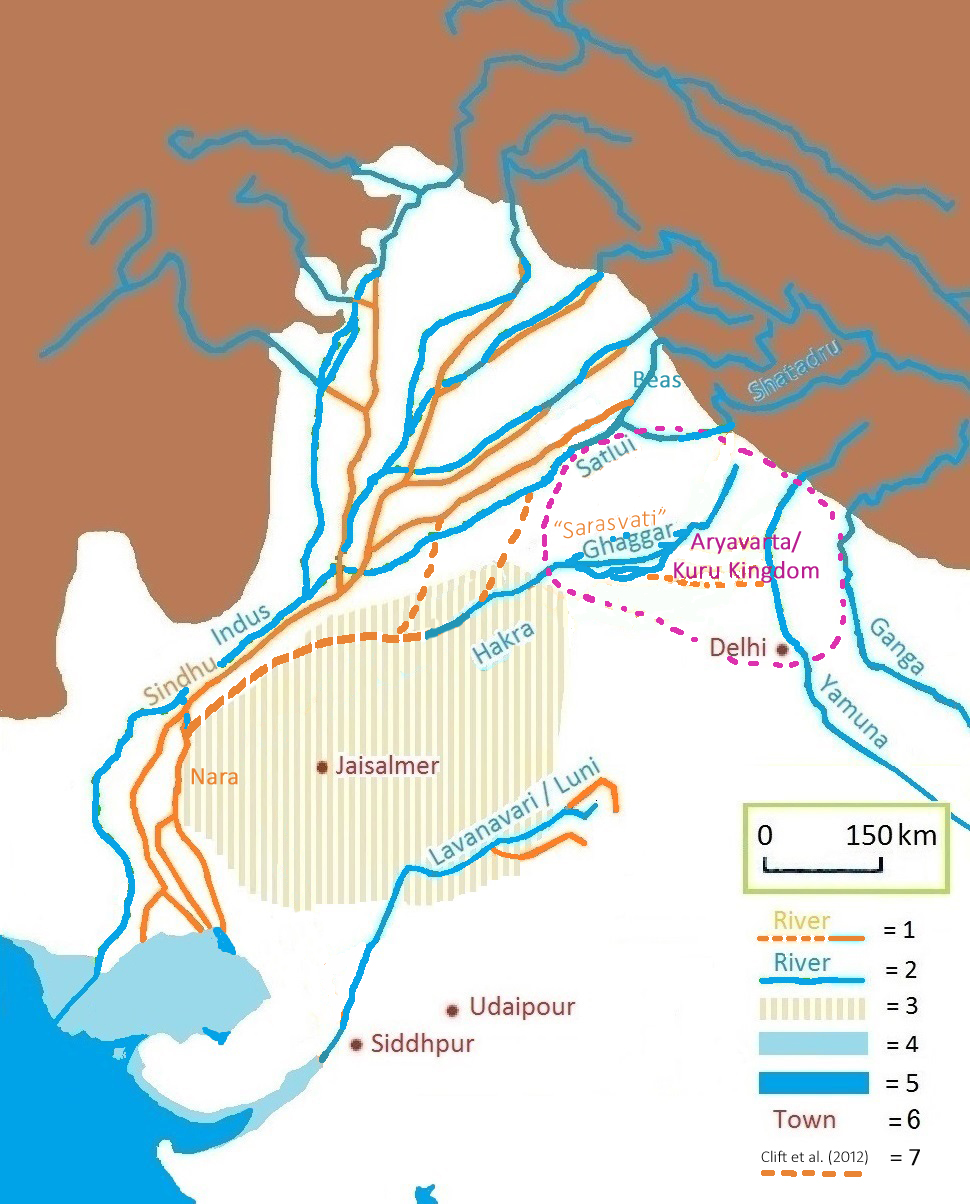
The vedic and present-day course of Ghaggar-Hakra River as proposed by Clift et al. (2012) and Khonde et al. (2017). 1 = ancient river; 2 = today's river; 3 = Thar desert; 4 = ancient shore; 5 = today's shore; 6 = today's settlements; 7 = dried-up Harappan Hakkra course, and pre-Harappan Sutlej paleochannels

In the Mesozoic era (252 to 66 mya), the area was a low lying peneplain, covered by shallow waters. Erosion resulted in the formation of three layers of planation surfaces during the post-Mesozoic (66 to 2.6 mya), and early Pleistocene (2.6 mya to 11,000 years ago) periods. As the Himalayas arose during the mid-Miocene period (23.4 to 5.3 mya), it gave rise to the monsoon.

During the Last Glacial Maximum (26,000–20,000 years ago), an estimated 2,400,000 km^{2} (930,000 sq mi) ice sheet covered the Tibetan Plateau. The low latitude ice sheet significantly affected radiative forcing, and reflected at least four times more solar radiation per unit area into space than ice at higher latitudes, resulting in further cooling of the overlying atmosphere during that period. Without the thermal low pressure caused by the heating, there was no monsoon over the Indian subcontinent. This lack of monsoon caused extensive rainfall over the Sahara region, while resulted in more dust deposited towards the Arabian Sea in the east. It also resulted in changes to the biotic life zones on the Indian subcontinent, as fauna responded to this shift in climate with species like Javan rusa deer migrating into India.

The Aravalli Range formed rapidly, and reached significant altitude during the early Holocene period (11,700 years ago). Between 10,000 and 8,000 years ago, a channel of the Ghaggar-Hakra River, identified with the paleo Sarasvati River, after its confluence with the Sutlej River flowed into the Nara River, a delta channel of the Indus River, but then changed its course. The upliftment of the Aravallis brought about changes in the hydrography of the region, with an increase in waters flowing through the Yamuna River, while depriving the headwaters of the Ghaggar-Hakra system. This left the Ghaggar-Hakra as a system of monsoon-fed rivers that no longer reached the sea, which ended up in the Thar desert.

Starting from around 4,500 to 5,000 years ago, when the monsoons that fed the river system diminished further, as the Aravallis blocked the monsoon winds from the east, the region became increasingly arid. The Indus Valley Civilisation had prospered in the area, (Note: In contrast to the mainstream view, Chatterjee et al. (2019) suggest that the river remained perennial till 4,500 years ago.) with several settlements along the course of the river system. When monsoons diminished even further, the dried-up Hakra became an intermittent river, and the urban Harappan civilisation declined, becoming localized in smaller agricultural communities. (Note: Giosan et al. (2012): "Contrary to earlier assumptions that a large glacier-fed Himalayan river, identified by some with the mythical Sarasvati, watered the Harappan heartland on the interfluve between the Indus and Ganges basins, we show that only monsoonal-fed rivers were active there during the Holocene."; "Numerous speculations have advanced the idea that the Ghaggar-Hakra fluvial system, at times identified with the lost mythical river of Sarasvati (e.g., 4, 5, 7, 19), was a large glacier fed Himalayan river. Potential sources for this river include the Yamuna River, the Sutlej River, or both rivers. However, the lack of large-scale incision on the interfluve demonstrates that large, glacier-fed rivers did not flow across the Ghaggar-Hakra region during the Holocene; "The present Ghaggar-Hakra valley and its tributary rivers are currently dry or have seasonal flows. Yet rivers were undoubtedly active in this region during the Urban Harappan Phase. We recovered sandy fluvial deposits approximately 5;400 y old at Fort Abbas in Pakistan (SI Text), and recent work (33) on the upper Ghaggar-Hakra interfluve in India also documented Holocene channel sands that are approximately 4;300 y old. On the upper interfluve, fine-grained floodplain deposition continued until the end of the Late Harappan Phase, as recent as 2,900 y ago (33) (Fig. 2B). This widespread fluvial redistribution of sediment suggests that reliable monsoon rains were able to sustain perennial rivers earlier during the Holocene and explains why Harappan settlements flourished along the entire Ghaggar-Hakra system without access to a glacier-fed river."; Valdiya (2013) dispute this, arguing that it was a large perennial river draining the high mountains as late as 3700–2500 years ago. Giosan et al. (2013) have responded to, and rejected, Valdiya's arguments.) Over the years, sand accumulated due to wind-blown sediments from the alluvial plains and the coast.

== Topography and geology ==
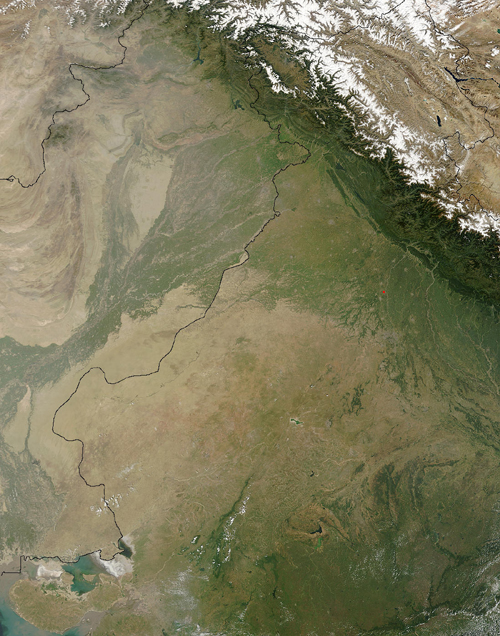
A satellite image of the Thar Desert

The eastern part of the Thar Desert, that lies in the western foothills of the Aravallis, consists of sandy plains intercepted by eroded hills of low elevation. It rises to about 325 m (1,066 ft) in elevations as it reaches the Aravallis, which continue as the plateau of the central India beyond the range. The sandy plains extend across to the west, with the altitude dropping to 150 m (490 ft) at the India-Pakistan border. Much of the desert area is covered by sand dunes that are formed due to accumulation of wind blown sand deposited over the sediments from the alluvial plains. The sand is highly mobile due to the strong winds that rise each year before the onset of the monsoon. Much of the bedrock is composed of igneous and metamorphic rocks.

The geology of the region varies across its area. The oldest rocks are found in the Barmer region in the south, which are volcanic rocks composed of felsite. In the Pokhran area, there are various colored shales, with varying hardness. Pale colored sandstones composed primarily of quartz are found south of Jodhpur. Sandstones with fossils belonging to the Jurassic period (201.4 to 143.1 mya) are found to the east of Balmer, and to the east and north of Jaisalmer. In the Jaisalmer region, the underlying sandstone beds are covered with layers of sandstone and limestone, which also consist of numerous fossils, and are used extensively as building materials. Towards the west and north west of Jaisalmer, a tract of dark coloured sandstone rocks with calcium, capped by red coloured red sandstone layer, and interspersed with yellow ammonite rocks.

== Climate and hydrography ==
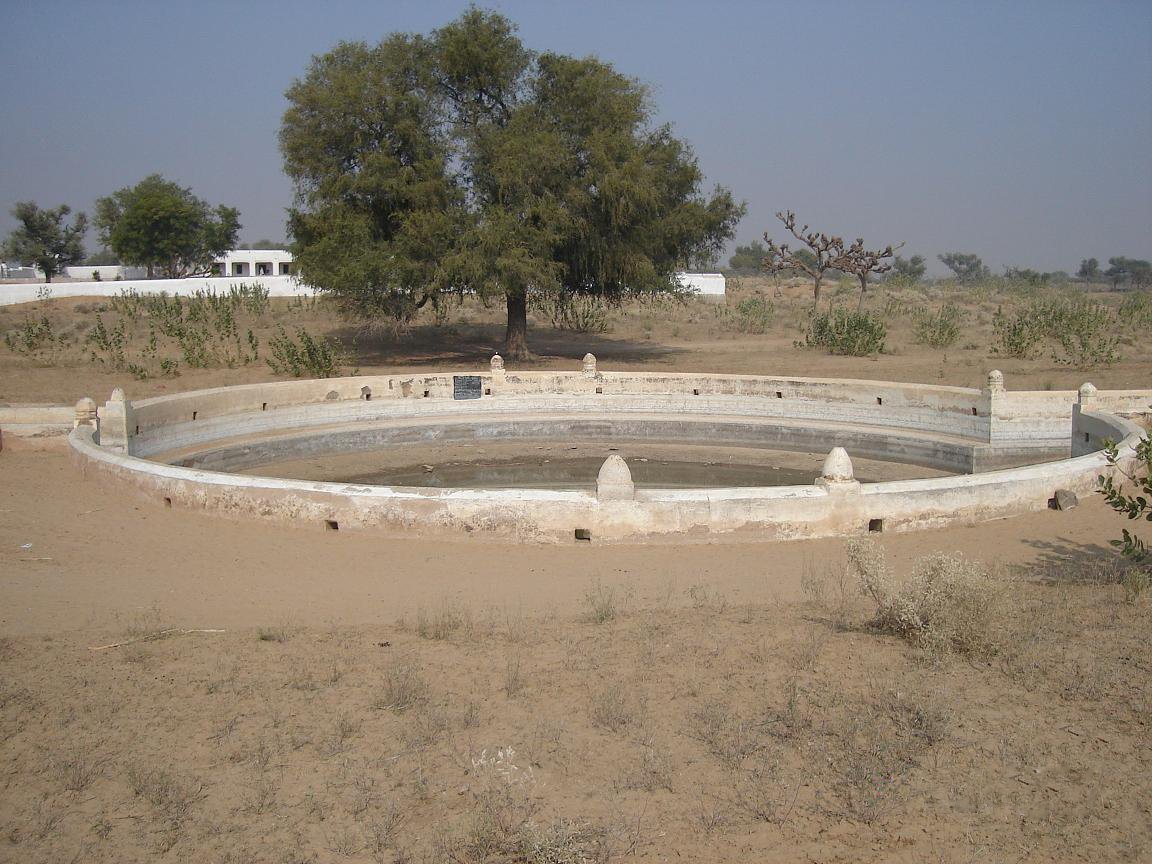
A taanka used to store rainwater

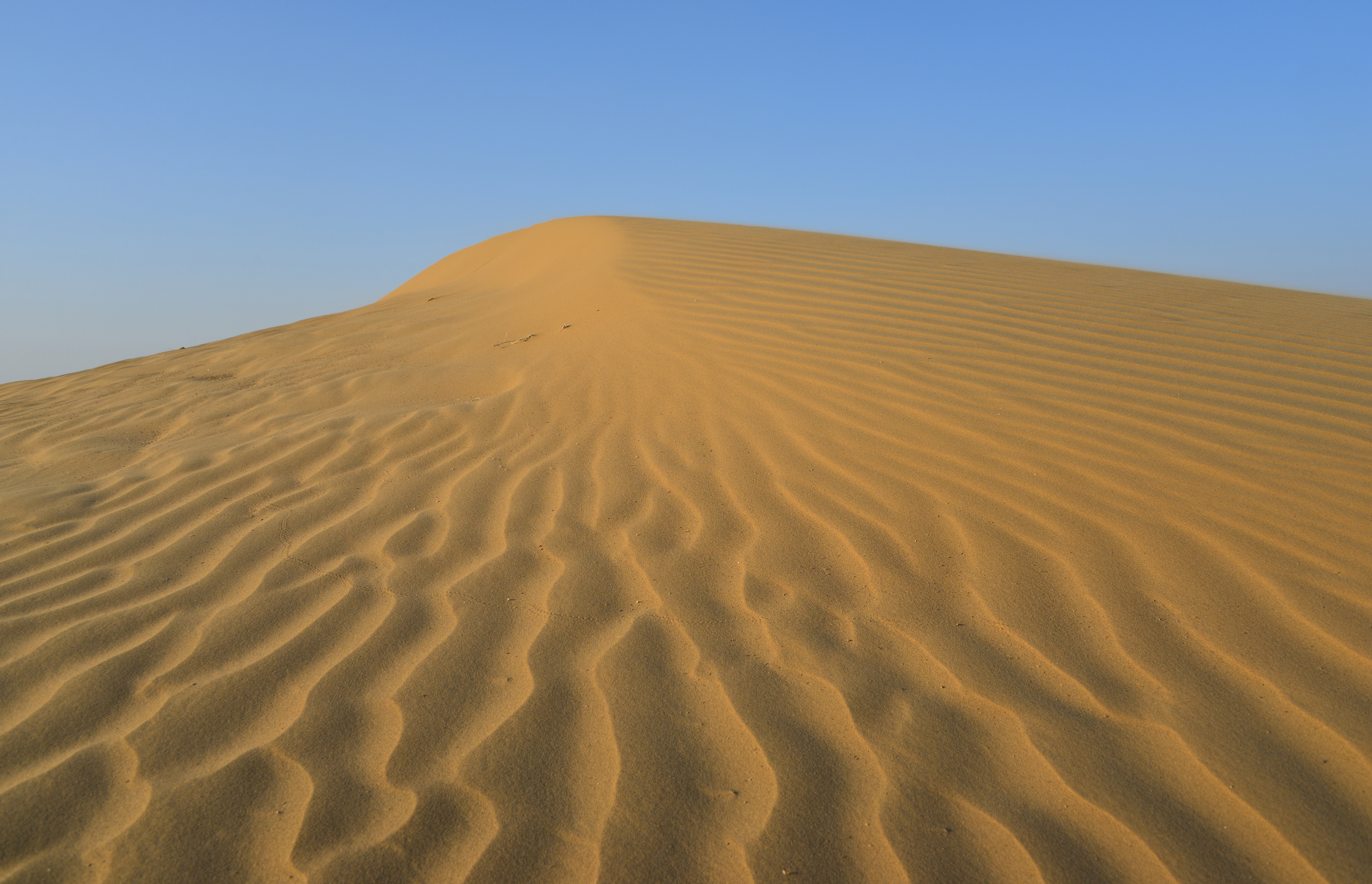
Sand dunes in the Thar Desert

The region has a desert climate. In the summer months of April to June, average maximum temperature ranges 40–42 °C (104–108 °F) with average minimum of 23–27 °C (73–81 °F). The maximum temperature often reaches above 50 °C (122 °F) during the peak summer. In the winter months of December to February, the minimum temperature reaches −2 °C (28 °F), with average maximum of 18–24 °C (64–75 °F) with average minimum of 3.5–10 °C (38.3–50.0 °F).

The region receives most of the rainfall during the southwest monsoon from June to September. Average annual rainfall ranges from 100–300 mm (3.9–11.8 in), and occurs during the short July-to-September southwest monsoon. The distribution of rainfall also varies significantly across years. The semi arid parts in the east have fewer sand dunes and receive slightly more precipitation.

The depth of the water table in the region varies between 10–40 m (33–131 ft), and the water is mostly brackish. The region is drained by a minor inland river system. Luni River is the longest and major river in the desert. Other minor rivers that form part of the Luni river system include Bandi, Ghaggar, Guhiya, Jawai, Jojari, Liladi, and Sukri rivers. There are numerous endorheic salt water lakes–Sambhar, Kharaghoda, Didwana, Pachpadra, and Phalodi. These lakes accumulate water during the monsoon rains and often evaporate slowly during the dry season. The salt content of these lakes comes from the weathering of the surrounding rocks in the region. The 649 km (403 mi)-long Indira Gandhi Canal, which channels water from the Indus River system, is a major source for irrigation and drinking water. Water reservoirs known as tobas, johads and taankas are used to store rain water.

== History ==
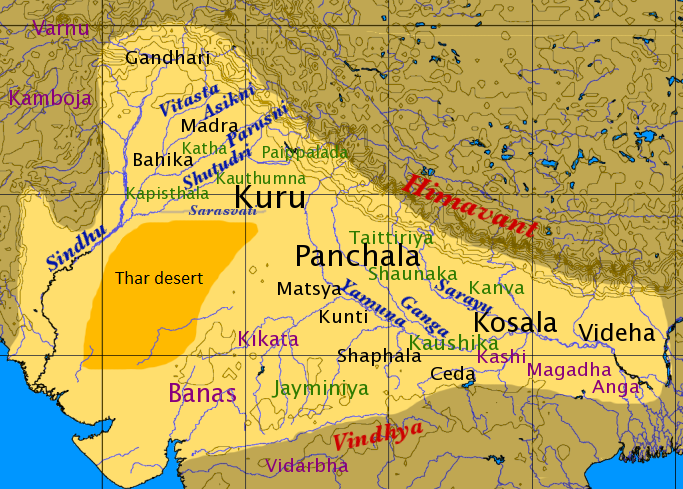
The Thar Desert (orange) during the Vedic Period

Lithic tools belonging to the prehistoric Aterian culture of the Maghreb from the Middle Paleolithic era have been found in the Thar Desert. The Indus Valley Civilization flourished along the vicinity of the Ghaggar-Hakra River between 3300 BCE to 1300 BCE. After the collapse of the Indus Valley Civilisation, which occurred around 1900 BCE, groups of Indo-Aryan peoples migrated into north-western India and started to inhabit the region.

During the Vedic period (1500 BCE to 500 BCE), various tribes inhabited the region, and the Kuru kingdom, the earliest Vedic state was formed by a super-tribe which joined several tribes in a new unit. Prior to the "second urbanisation" that occurred in the Indo-Gangetic Plains, small settlements of the Painted Grey Ware culture arose in the Ghaggar-Hakra valley.

By the third century BCE, a large part of the Indian subcontinent was under the control of the Mauryan Empire, including portions of the desert. The Kushan Empire expanded out of what is now Afghanistan into the northwest of the Indian subcontinent in the middle of the 1st century CE. The Gupta Empire flourished between the 2nd and 6th centuries CE, reaching its peak in the 5th century CE, when its territory incorporated the present Thar Desert region.

In the eastern part of the region, the Brahmin dynasty ruled in the 7th to 8th centuries CE, which was later annexed to the Umayyad Caliphate in early 8th century CE, and the Abbasid Caliphate later. The Pratihara dynasty ruled the eastern part of the region between the 8th and 11th centuries CE. Mahmud of Ghazni annexed the region to the Ghaznavid Empire in the 11th century CE.

In the later Middle Ages, the western part of the region was ruled by several Rajput states. These states started forming in the late 7th century CE, and rose to political prominence later. The eastern part of the region was ruled by the Soomras, and the Sammas from later 11th to early 16th century CE. The period was marked by the conflict between the Mughal Empire and the other dynasties that ruled the region. The conflict originated with the invasion by Timurid king Babur, which was resisted by the Rajput states under Rana Sanga.

The conflicts continued for over 200 years, with the initial phase remaining indecisive. The Mughals gained an upper hand between the mid 15th and late 16th centuries, while the Rajputs retook control later after the Mughal empire began to collapse in the late 16th century. The Marathas took control over most of the region in the 18th century CE. In 19th century CE, the region came under the suzerainty of the British Raj, wherein it was composed of a large number of princely states, with powers divided amongst the local rulers and the British.

The partition of India resulted in the formation of the independent states of India and Pakistan, and the Thar Desert region was split between the two countries. It resulted in large scale conflicts, and mass migration of people across the borders. After the Political integration of India, and reorganisation of Indian states, majority of the eastern part of the desert became part of the Rajasthan state, with minor portions in Haryana, Punjab, and Gujarat. The western third became part of the Sindh and Punjab provinces in Pakistan. In 1965 and 1971, further population exchanges took place in the Thar region between India and Pakistan; 3,500 people, mostly Muslims, moved from India to Pakistan, while thousands of Hindu families migrated from Pakistani to the Indian section.

== Demographics and economy ==
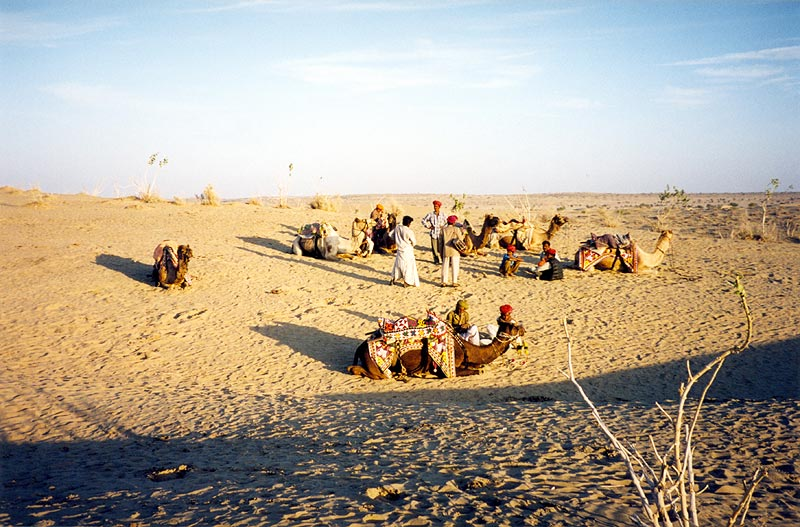
Desert tribes near Jaisalmer

The Tharis are the natives of the region. The Thar Desert is the most widely populated desert in the world, with a population density of 83 people per km^{2}. The inhabitants are composed of various religions including Hindus, and Muslims, and belong to different ethnicities. The most spoken languages are Rajasthani languages such as Marwari in central and eastern regions, Sindhi in the southwest, and Lahnda in the northwest region of the Thar. Thari language, spoken by the Tharis, which forms part of the Rajasthani language family, is considered related to Marwari and Sindhi. Thareli is a dialect of the Sindhi spoken in the region.

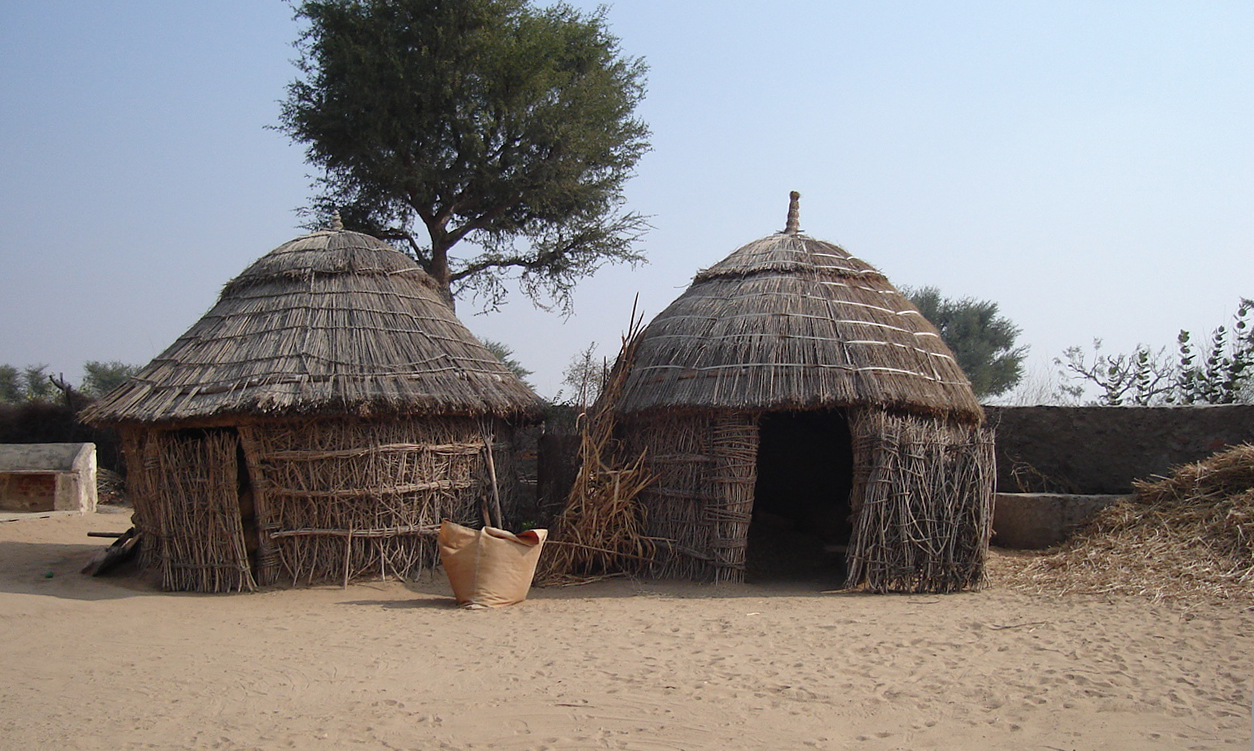
Huts in the Thar Desert

Majority of the people live in rural nomadic communities in the harsh environment of the Thar Desert. People live in small huts which are shaped like a cylindrical bee hive topped by a conical thatched roof. The huts are distributed in small randomly formed clusters, while carefully planned for privacy so that the entrances of adjacent huts never face each other. Middle class people in permanent settlements live in single-storeyed dwellings with large rectangular courtyards, and wide verandahs. It is supported by timber made from local wood and plastered on the upper side with a type of clay. The wood of Prosopis cineraria (khejri) provides high-quality fuel wood, and building material. Its roots also encourage nitrogen fixation, which produces higher crop yields.

Water scarcity remains the major problem in the desert with dependence on temporary storage of rain water, and prolonged periods of drought. Villages often consists of a few water sources such as temporary wells, and storage ponds. The people spend a considerable amount of time fetching water for themselves or their animals. The Thar desert region has often suffered from poor development due to the harsh environment and access to outside world.

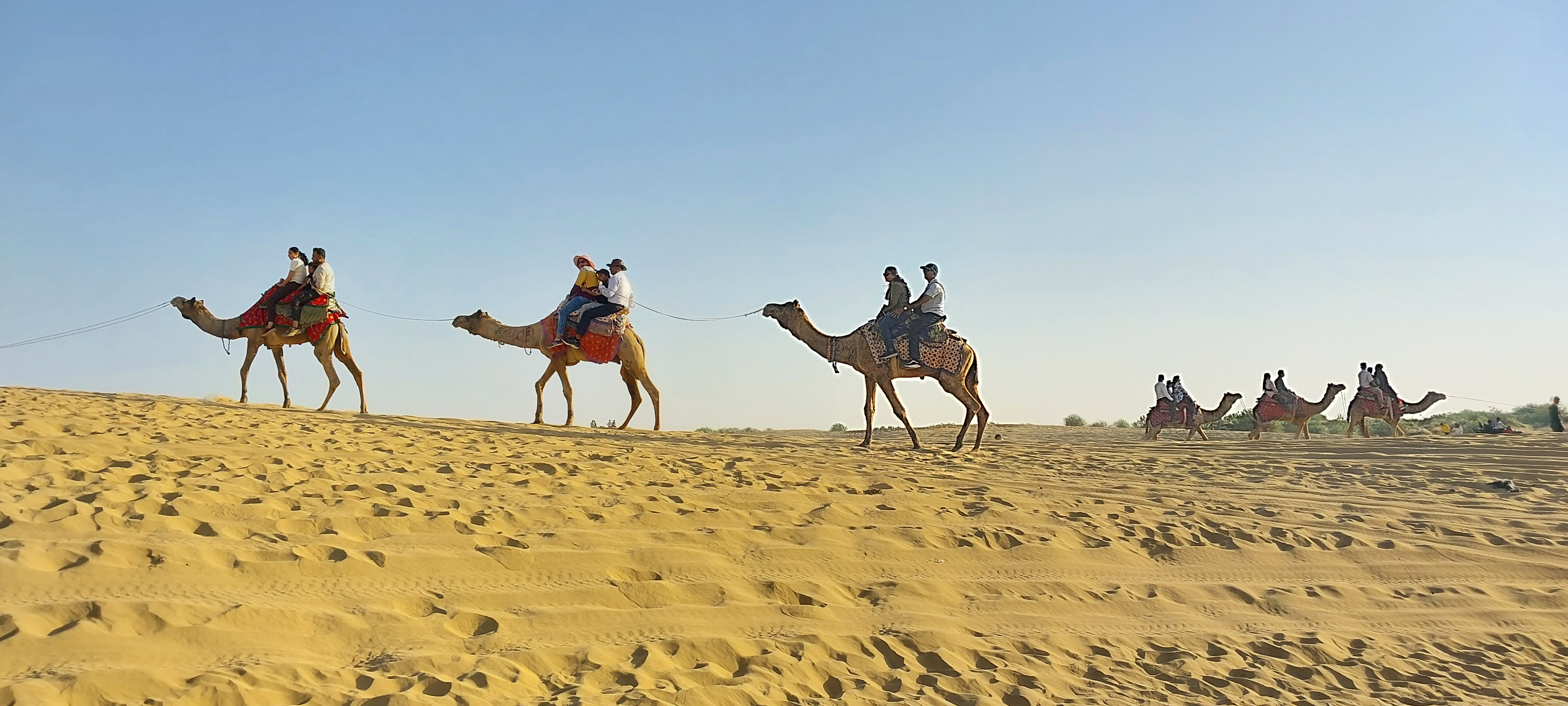
Camel rides in the desert

Most of the people are involved in herding animals, limited agriculture, and in handicrafts. Agriculture happens in specific areas supplanted by stored water, or irrigation from canals. Khadins are special crop enbankments which prevent water run off and used for agriculture. Drought resistant varieties of green gram, sesame, millets, cluster beans, chickpea, and jowar are grown in the region. Shrubs like melon, cucumber, citrus fruits, and date palms, are grown near water bodies. The Thar region is a major opium production and consumption area. The Thari cow breed originated from Tharparkar.

The Government of India initiated departmental exploration for oil in 1955 and 1956 in the area, and natural gas was discovered in 1988 in the Jaisalmer basin. The region is also home to several solar energy generation units, such as the Bhadla Solar Park, with a generation capacity of over 2 gigawatts. Desert safari on camels have become increasingly popular with tourists frequenting the desert seeking adventure on camels, resulting in the development of the ecotourism industry.

== Biodiversity ==
=== Vegetation ===
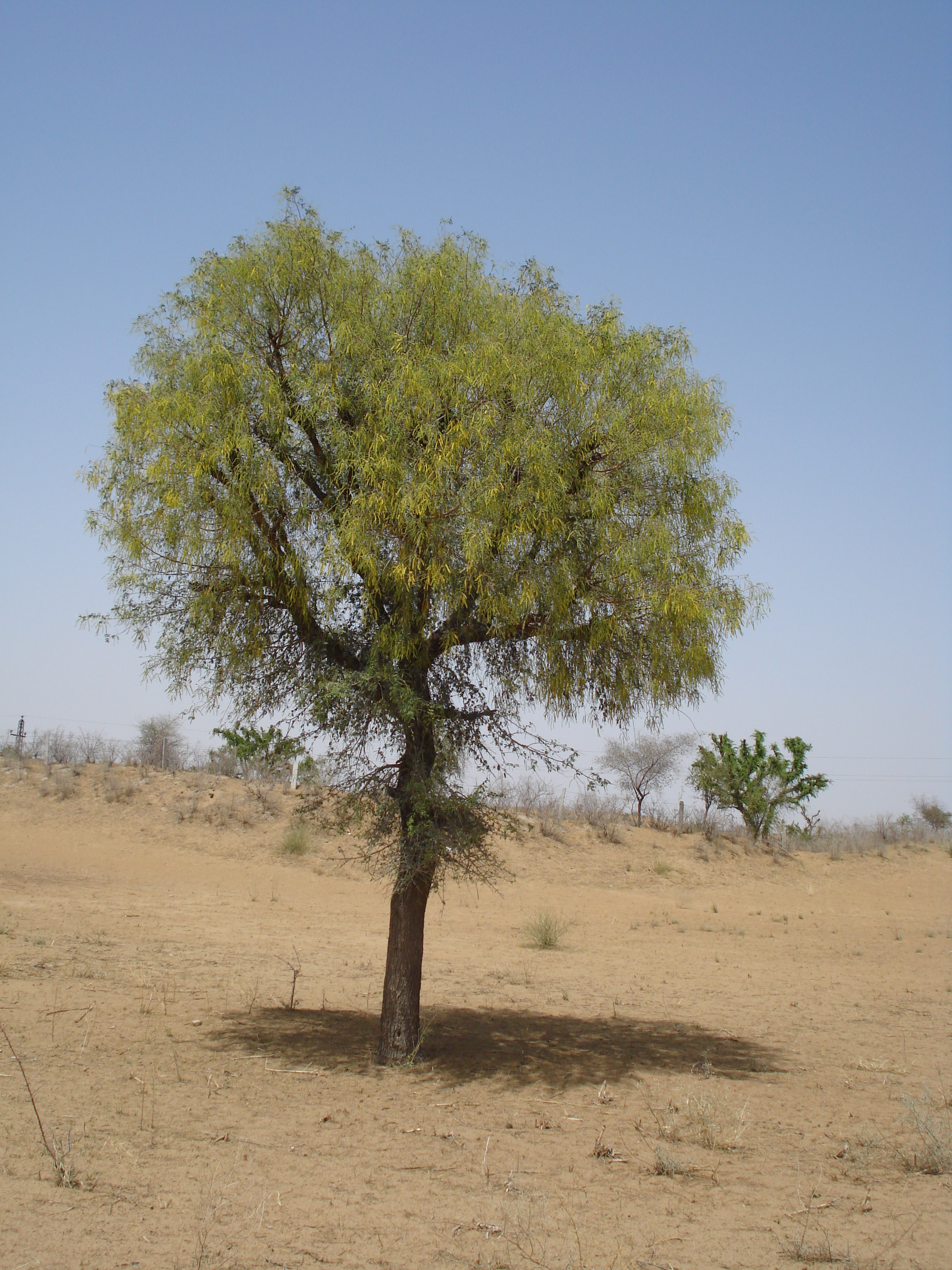
Prosopis cineraria tree

The natural vegetation of the dry area is classified as northwestern thorn scrub forest, which consist of small, loosely-scattered patches of greenery. The densities and sizes of these green patches increase from west to east, aligning with the pattern of increase in rainfall. There are 168 plant species belonging to 48 families reported from the area. Some species of trees grow in low-lying areas of the desert. Other vegetation consists of shrubs, and perennial herbs. The endemic floral species include Calligonum polygonoides, Prosopis cineraria, Acacia nilotica, Tamarix aphylla, and Cenchrus biflorus.

Plant species include Aerva javanica, Balanites roxburghii, Calotropis procera, Capparis decidua, Clerodendrum multiflorum, Commiphora mukul, Commiphora wightii, Cordia sinensis, Crotalaria burhia, Ephedra foliata, Euphorbia caducifolia, Euphorbia neriifolia, Grewia tenax, Leptadenia pyrotechnica, Lycium barbarum, Maytenus emarginata, Mimosa hamata, Suaeda fruticosa, Vachellia jacquemontii, Ziziphus nummularia and Ziziphus zizyphus.

Herbs and grasses include Cenchrus biflorus, Cenchrus ciliaris, Citrullus colocynthis Cenchrus setiger, Cynodon dactylon, Dactyloctenium scindicum, Desmostachya bipinnata, Lasiurus scindicus, Ochthochloa compressa, Panicum turgidum, Panicum antidotale, Dichanthium annulatum, Sorghum halepense, Sporobolus marginatus, Saccharum spontaneum, Tribulus terrestris, and species of Eragrostis, Phragmites, and Typha.

The soil of the Thar Desert remains dry for much of the year, so it is prone to wind erosion. High-velocity winds blow soil from the desert, depositing some of it on neighboring fertile lands, and causing sand dunes within the desert to shift. To counteract this problem, sand dunes are stabilised by erecting micro windbreak barriers with scrub material and then by afforestation of the treated dunes by planting the seedlings of shrubs such as Calligonum polygonoides, Cassia auriculata, and Ricinus communis, and trees such as Acacia senegal, Prosopis juliflora, and Albizzia lebbeck.

=== Fauna ===
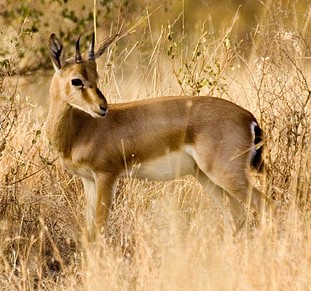
Chinkara found in the Thar Desert

The fauna of Thar has characteristics of both mesic and desert habitats. About 60 species of mammals, 51 species of reptiles, and eight amphibian species have been reported from the desert. About 69% of the herpetofauna and 54% of mammalian fauna are affiliated with the Sahara region. Important mammal species include Chinkara, Desert fox, Indian fox, Desert Cat, Hairy-footed Gerbil, Desert hare, and Long-eared hedgehog (Hemeichinus auritus).

Reptilian species include 14 species of lizards and seven species of snakes. Endemic reptile species of the Thar Desert include Rajasthan toad-headed lizard, and Sindh awl-headed snake. Other species of reptiles include Indian spiny-tailed lizard, Dwarf gecko, Persian gecko, Desert monitor, and Saw-scaled viper. In 2023, fossil remains of Tharosaurus indicus, a new species of sauropod dinosaur was found in the Thar Desert. It was discovered in the outcrops belonging to the Jaisalmer Formation, dating to the Bathonian age of the Middle Jurassic epoch.

More than 100 bird species of migratory and resident desert birds, are found in the desert. Significant bird species include the endangered Oriental white-backed vulture, and Indian vulture, White-browed bushchat, Green munia, and the visiting Houbara bustard. The Great Indian Bustard, classified as critically endangered, and one of the world’s heaviest flying birds, inhabits the open shrub lands of the desert. The Indian peafowl is a resident breeder in the Thar region, and has adapted to the desert ecosystem.

=== Protected areas ===
There are several protected areas in the Thar Desert:

- In India:
  - Desert National Park in Rajasthan covers 3,162 km^{2} (1,221 sq mi), The Akal Wood Fossil Park forms part of the protected area.
  - Tal Chhapar Sanctuary covers 7 km^{2} (2.7 sq mi) and is an Important Bird Area located in the Churu district, in Rajasthan.
  - Sundha Mata conservation reserve covers 117.49 km^{2} (45.36 sq mi) and is located in the Jalore District of Rajasthan.
- In Pakistan:
  - Lal Suhanra Biosphere Reserve and National Park is a UNESCO declared biosphere reserve, which covers 65,791 ha (162,570 acres) the Cholistan region of the Thar Desert.
  - Nara Desert Wildlife Sanctuary covers 6,300 km^{2} (2,400 sq mi), and is located in Mirpurkhas District.

== See also ==
- Arid Forest Research Institute – Indian forest research institute
- Nara Desert – Desert in Sindh, Pakistan
- Teri (geology) – Coastal dune complex in southeastern India
- Thar (Sindh) – Linguistic and Cultural Region of Sindh

== Sources ==
- Chatterjee, Anirban; Ray, Jyotiranjan S.; Shukla, Anil D.; Pande, Kanchan (20 November 2019). "On the existence of a perennial river in the Harappan heartland". Scientific Reports. 9 (1): 17221. Bibcode:2019NatSR...917221C. doi:10.1038/s41598-019-53489-4. ISSN 2045-2322. PMC 6868222. PMID 31748611.
- Clift, Peter D.; Carter, Andrew; Giosan, Liviu; Durcan, Julie; et al. (2012), "U-Pb zircon dating evidence for a Pleistocene Sarasvati River and capture of the Yamuna River", Geology, 40 (3): 211–214, Bibcode:2012Geo....40..211C, doi:10.1130/g32840.1, S2CID 130765891
- Giosan; et al. (2012). "Fluvial landscapes of the Harappan civilization". PNAS. 109 (26): E1688–E1694. Bibcode:2012PNAS..109E1688G. doi:10.1073/pnas.1112743109. PMC 3387054. PMID 22645375.
- Giosan, Liviu; Clift, Peter D.; Macklin, Mark G.; Fuller, Dorian Q. (10 October 2013). "Sarasvati II". Current Science. 105 (7): 888–890. JSTOR 24098502.
- Khonde, Nitesh; Kumar Singh, Sunil; Maur, D. M.; Rai, Vinai K.; Chamyal, L. S.; Giosan, Liviu (2017), "Tracing the Vedic Saraswati River in the Great Rann of Kachchh", Scientific Reports, 7 (1): 5476, Bibcode:2017NatSR...7.5476K, doi:10.1038/s41598-017-05745-8, PMC 5511136, PMID 28710495
- Maemoku, Hideaki; Shitaoka, Yorinao; Nagatomo, Tsuneto; Yagi, Hiroshi (2013). "Geomorphological Constraints on the Ghaggar River Regime During the Mature Harappan Period". In Giosan, Liviu; Fuller, Dorian Q.; Nicoll, Kathleen; Flad, Rowan K.; Clift, Peter D. (eds.). Climates, Landscapes, and Civilizations. American Geophysical Union Monograph Series 198. John Wiley & Sons. ISBN 978-1-118-70443-1.
- Sankaran, A. V. (25 October 1999). "Saraswati – The ancient river lost in the desert". Current Science. 77 (8): 1054–1060. JSTOR 24103577. Archived from the original on 19 September 2004.
- Singh, Ajit; et al. (2017). "Counter-intuitive influence of Himalayan river morphodynamics on Indus Civilisation urban settlements". Nature Communications. 8 (1) 1617. Bibcode:2017NatCo...8.1617S. doi:10.1038/s41467-017-01643-9. PMC 5705636. PMID 29184098.
- Valdiya, K.S. (2013). "The River Saraswati was a Himalayan-born river" (PDF). Current Science. 104 (1): 42.
