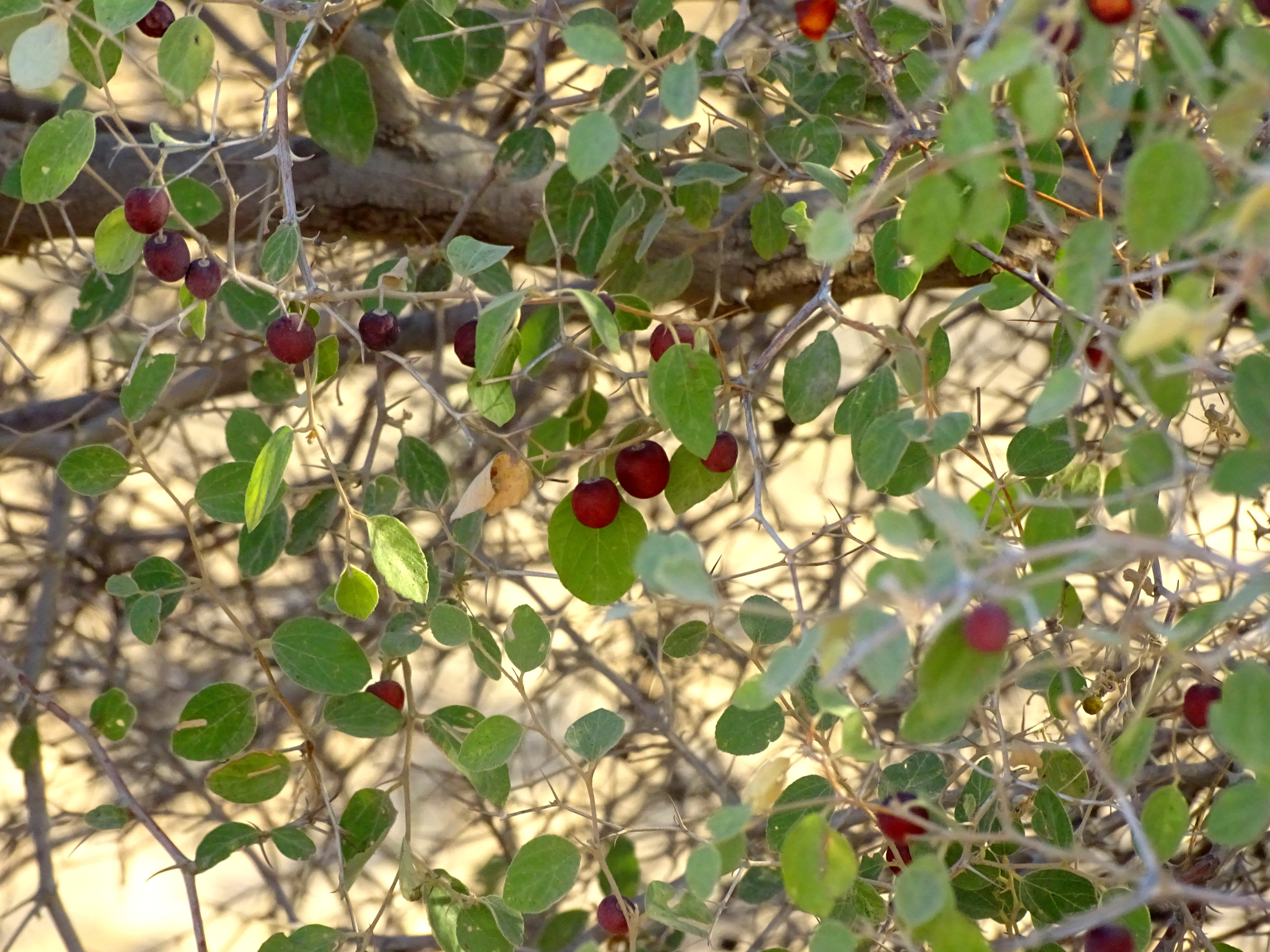

Conservation status
- Least Concern (IUCN 3.1)

Scientific classification
- Kingdom: Plantae
- Clade: Tracheophytes
- Clade: Angiosperms
- Clade: Eudicots
- Clade: Rosids
- Order: Rosales
- Family: Rhamnaceae
- Genus: Ziziphus
- Species: Z. nummularia

Binomial name
- Ziziphus nummularia (Burm.f.) Wight & Arn.

Synonyms
- Rhamnus nummularia Burm.f.; Rhamnus microphylla Roxb., nom. illeg. homonym. post.; Ziziphus microphylla Roxb.; Ziziphus nummularia var. glabrescens Bhandari & Bhansali; Ziziphus rotundifolia Lam.

= Ziziphus nummularia =

Species of plant

Ziziphus nummularia, commonly known as wild jujube or jharberi in Hindi, is a species of Ziziphus native to the Thar Desert of western India and southeastern Pakistan, Afghanistan, south Iran, Iraq, the northern Arabian Peninsula, the southern Levant, and the Sinai Peninsula. Ziziphus nummularia is a shrub up to 6 metres (20 ft) or higher, branching to form a thicket. The leaves are rounded like those of Ziziphus jujuba but differ from those in having a pubescence on the adaxial surface. The plant is commonly found in arid areas, hills, plains, and agricultural fields.

== Description ==
Ziziphus nummularia is a much-branched, widely-spreading, thorny bush or shrub up to 6 or 8 m (20 or 26 ft) tall. The branches and twigs have a velvety texture and a pale purplish colour. The lateral roots are long and spread deeply into the substrate. The alternately arranged leaves are simple and ovate, 2.5 cm (1 in) long, with serrate margins; the upper surface of the blade is dark green and glossy, and the under surface is white and downy. The stipules are often replaced by a pair of brown spines, one short, down-curving hook, the other 1 cm (0.4 in) long, robust, and straight. The inflorescence is a cyme, the individual pale yellow flowers being bisexual with parts in fives, and often having no petals. They are followed by small red or blackish drupes not exceeding 1 cm (0.4 in) in diameter, containing a hard stone, inside which there are usually two seeds.

== Distribution and habitat ==
Ziziphus nummularia is native to India, Nepal, Pakistan, Afghanistan, Iran, Iraq, Saudi Arabia, the UAE, Jordan, Israel, Palestine, and the Sinai Peninsula. It is tolerant of a range of habitats including hillsides, plains, ravines, cultivated areas and sand dunes. On the sandy hills of southern Rajasthan, it is associated with Euphorbia caducifolia, Butea monosperma, Millettia pinnata, Syzygium hyrianium and Wrightia tinctoria.

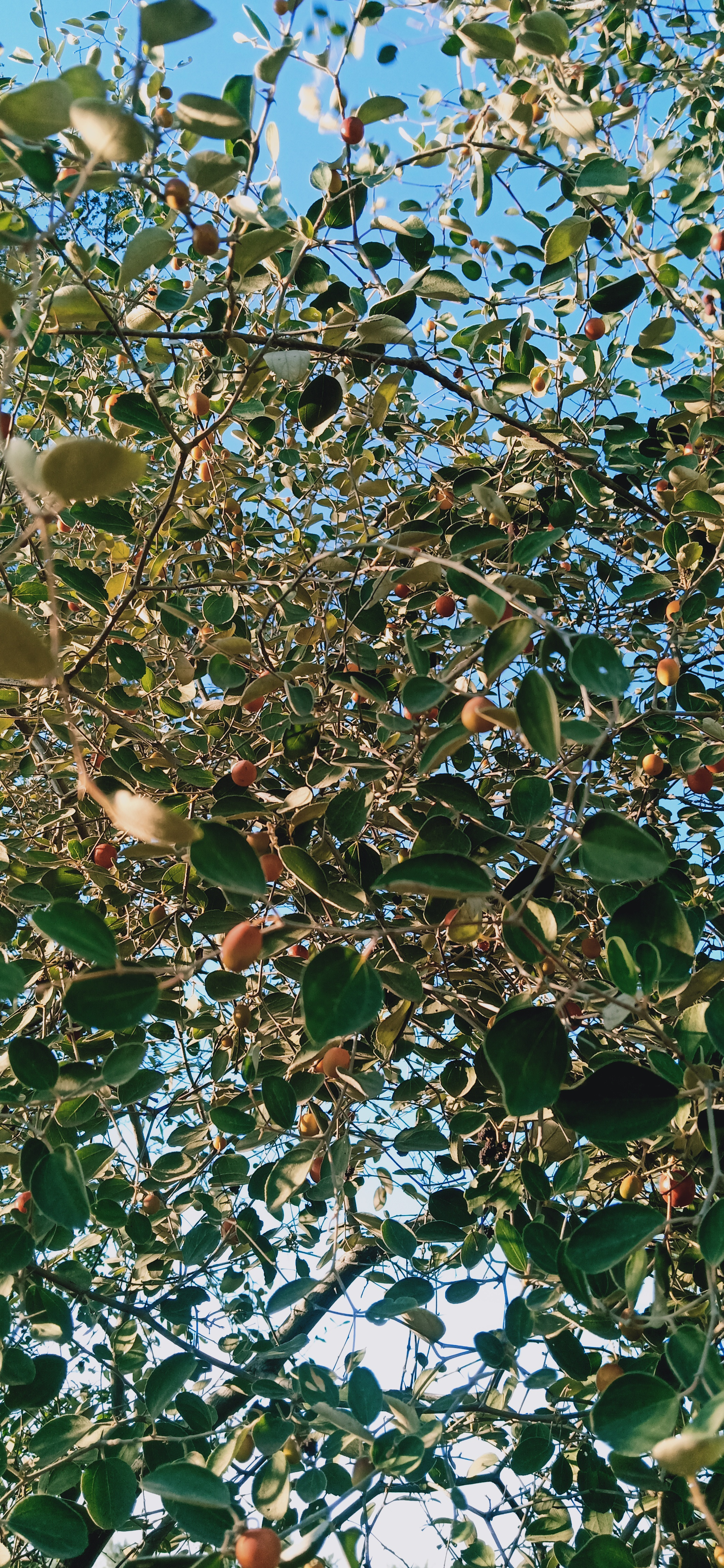
Rajasthani Ber, Sujangarh (churu)

== Uses ==
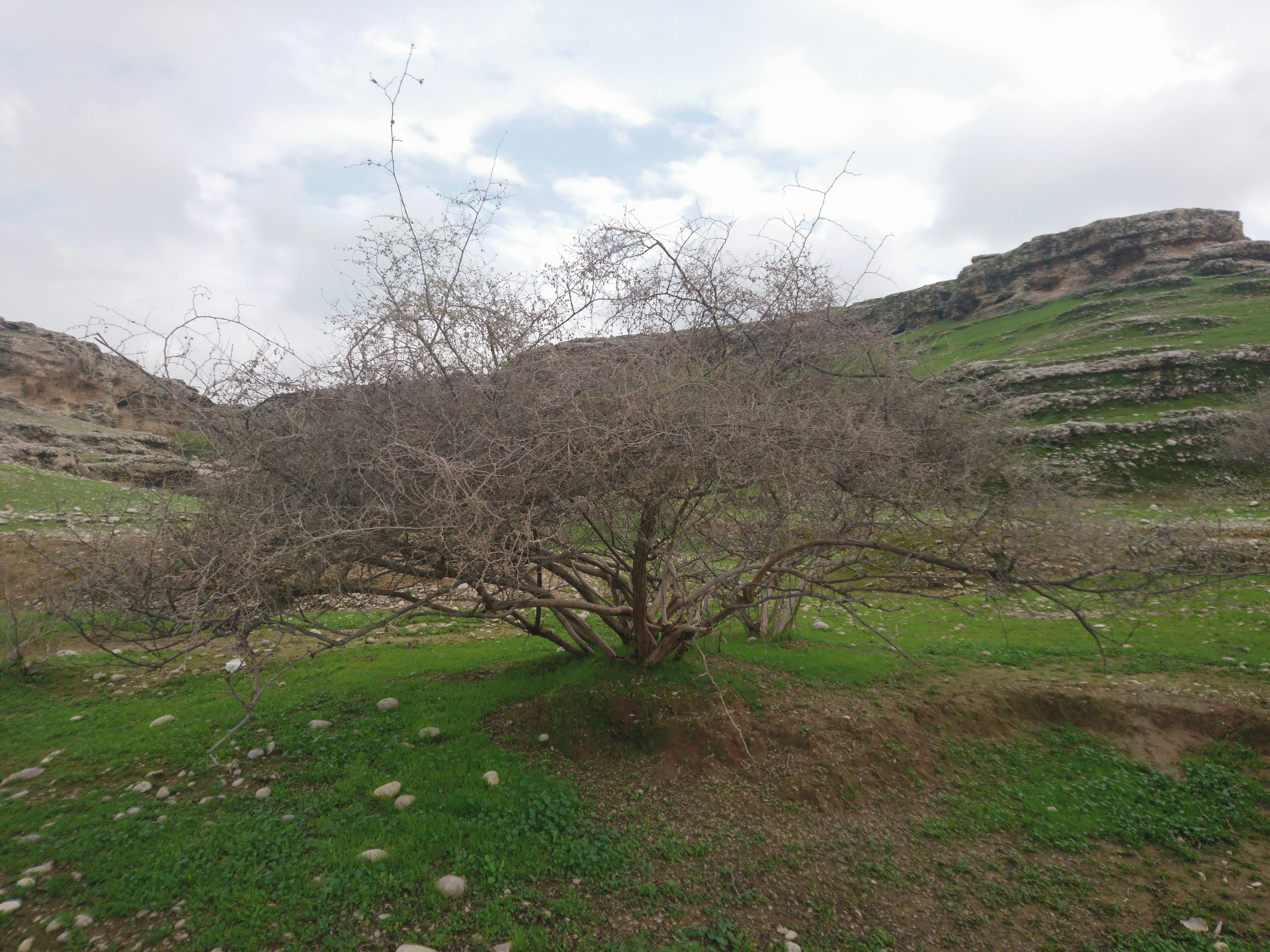
Ziziphus Nummularia in Behbahan, Iran

Ziziphus nummularia has been used for erosion control, reducing wind damage, and allowing deposited material to stabilise, forming a microhabitat that enables other plants such as grasses to grow. The shrub sends up many suckers from the root system and can be planted to form a windbreak, sometimes in association with Crotalaria burhia. The timber is used in building construction and to make farm implements, and it also makes good fuel and charcoal. The leaves can provide forage for livestock; in India they are picked, dried, and stored, producing about 1,000 kg (2,200 lb) dried foliage per hectare. The fruits are edible, sweet, and acidic. They can be eaten raw, pickled, dried, or used to make confectionery. Rats and gerbils are also attracted to the fruit, which can therefore be used in poison baits to attract the rodents.

== Medias ==
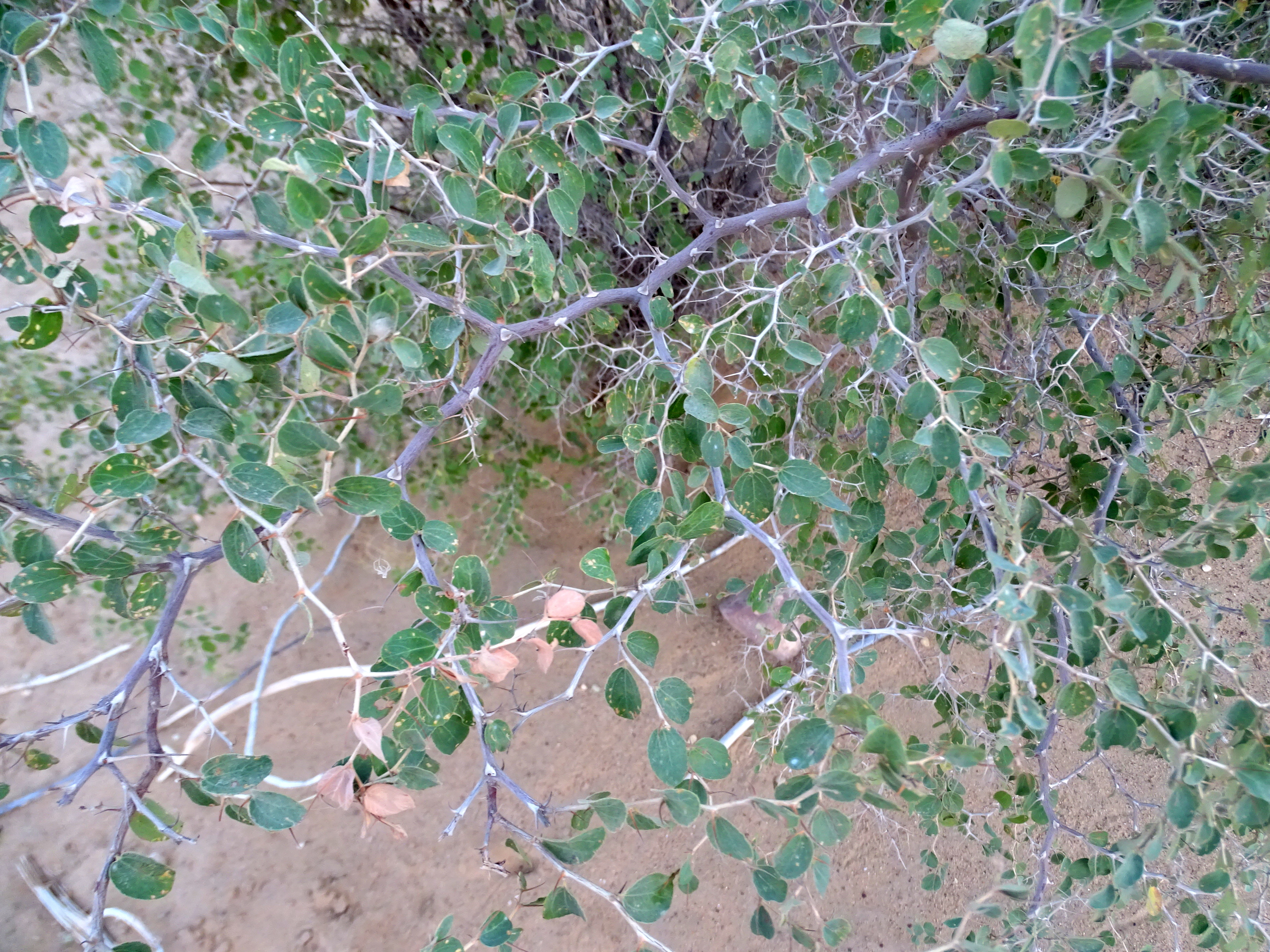

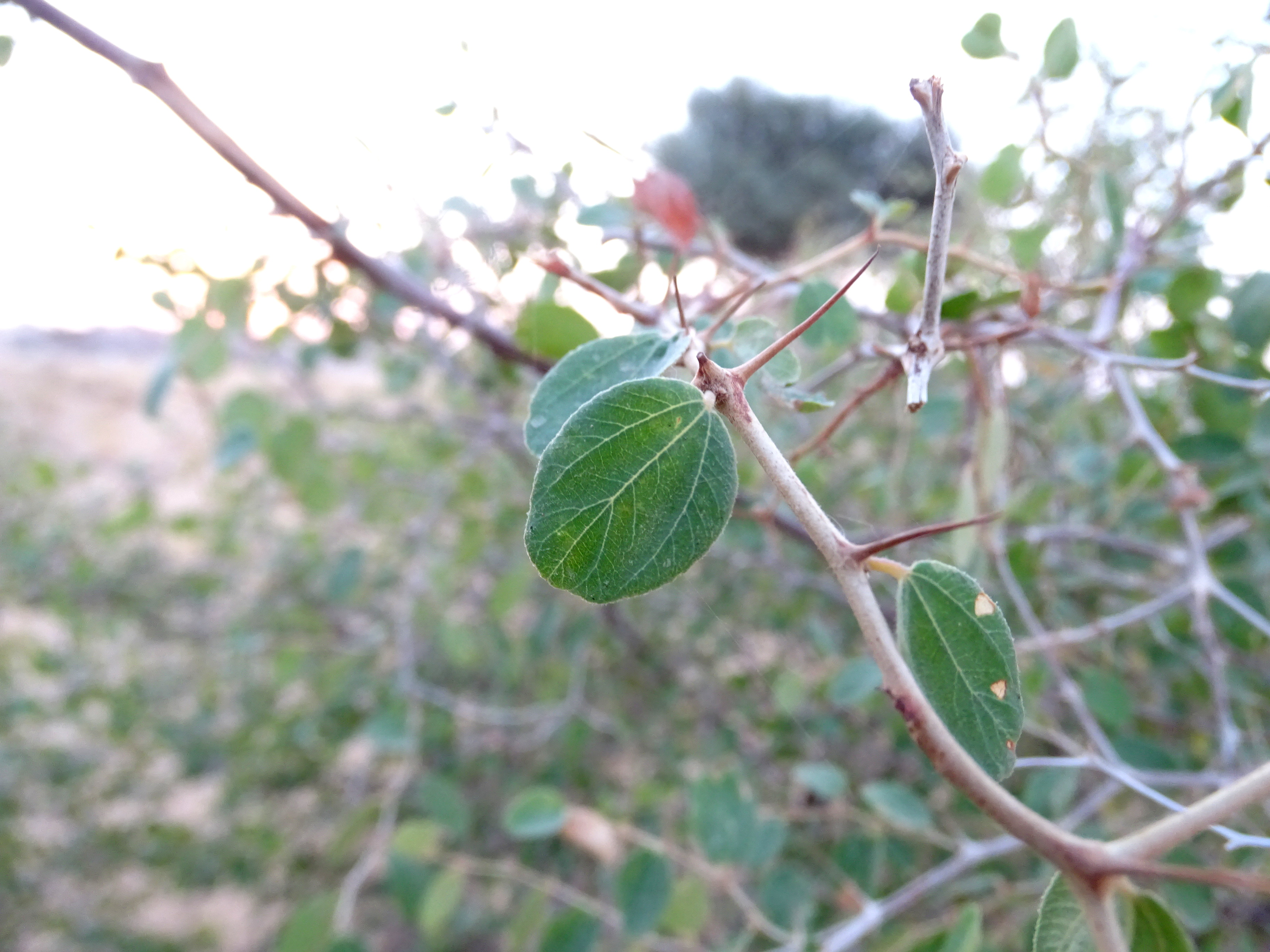

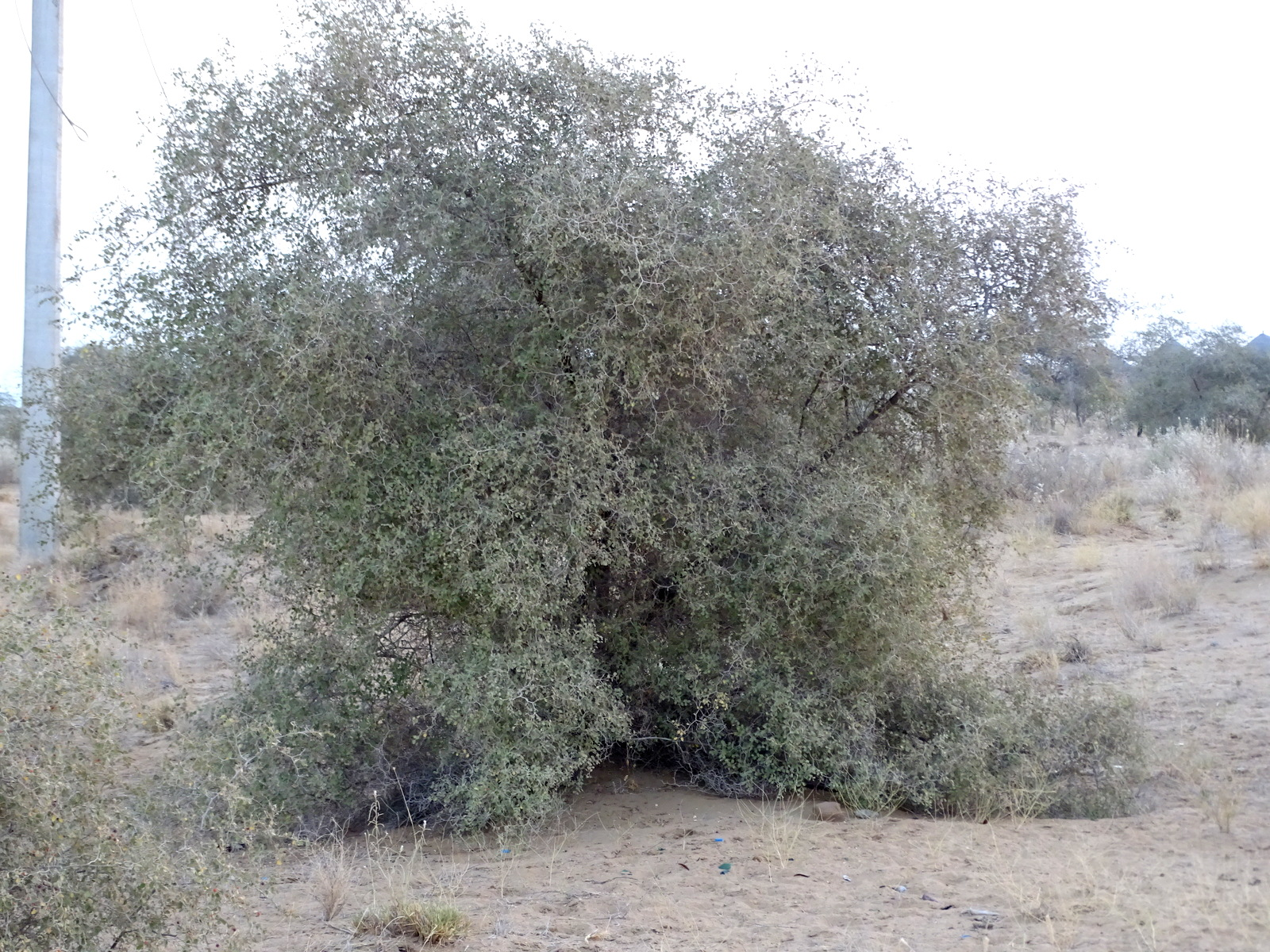

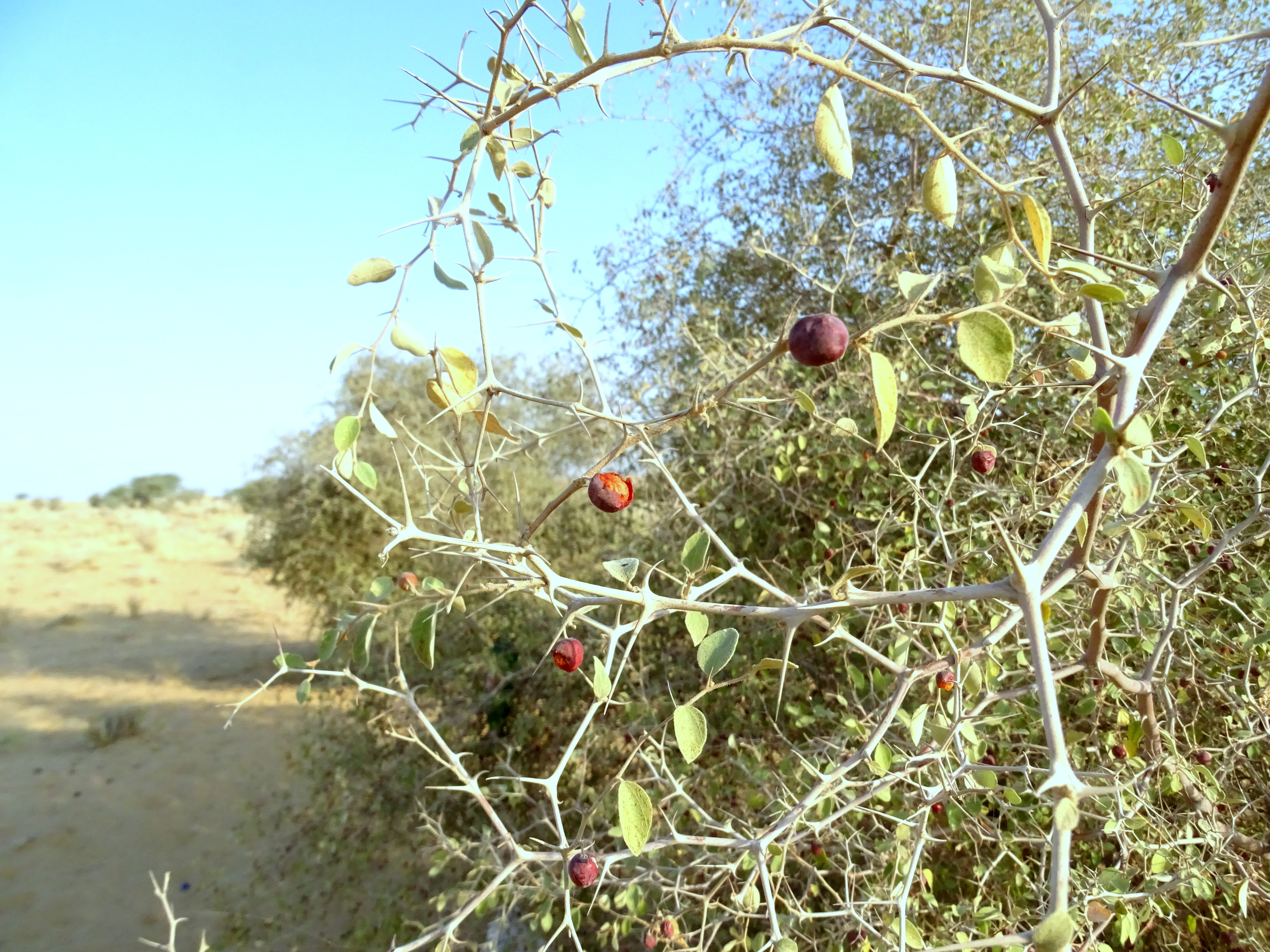

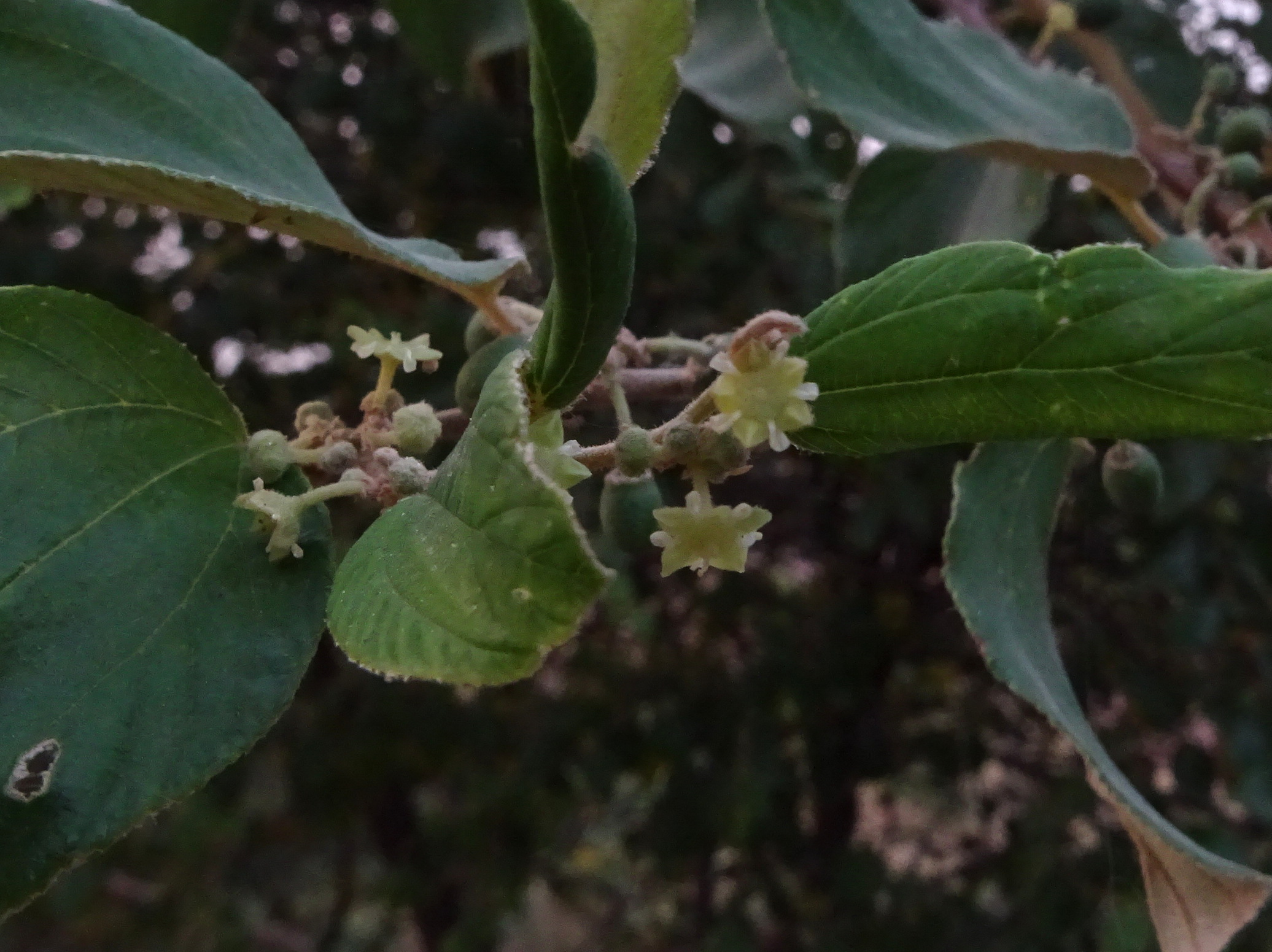

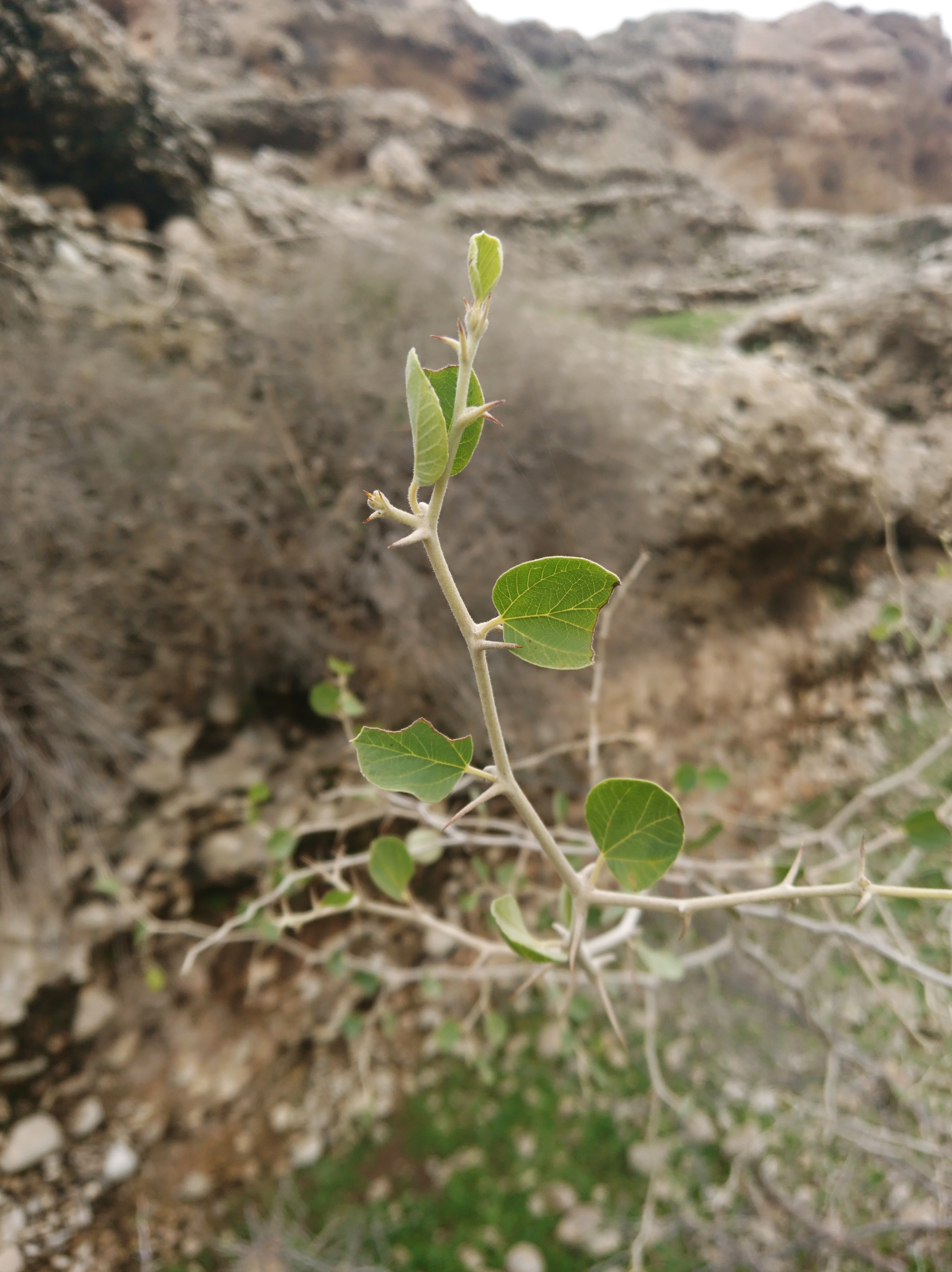
Ziziphus nummularia leaf in Behbahan, Iran

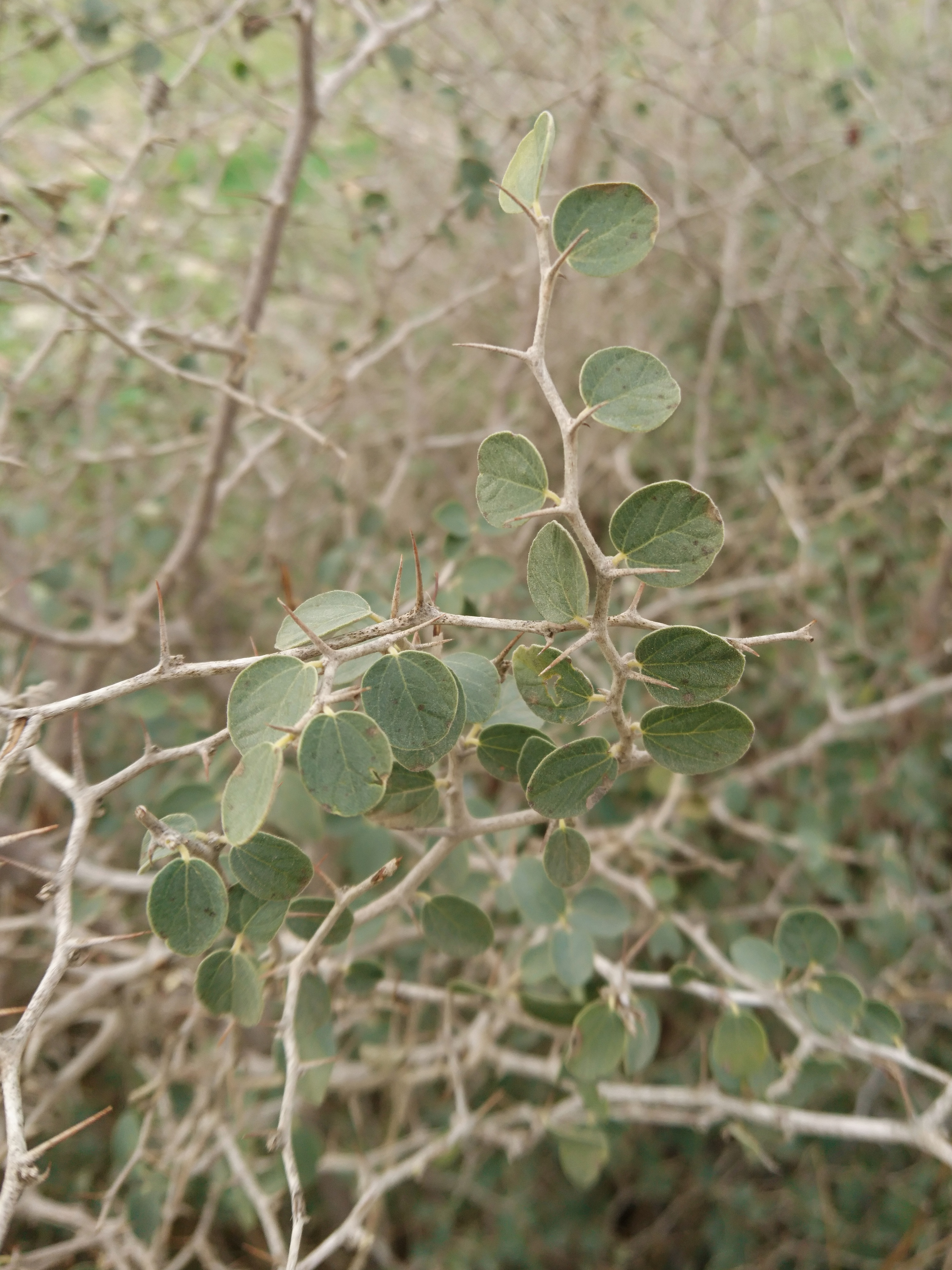
Ziziphus nummularia leaf, Iran

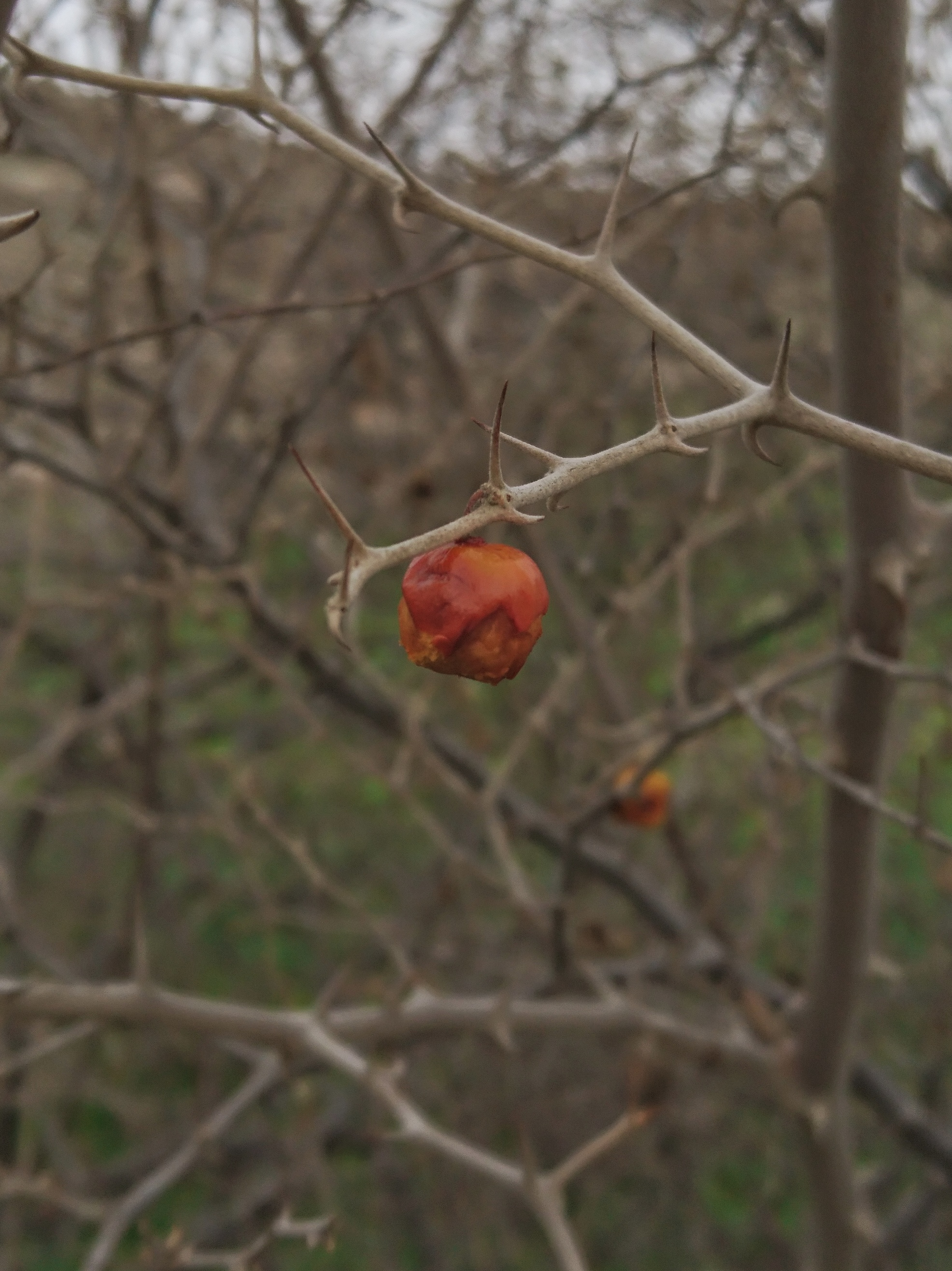
Half-eaten dried Ziziphus nummularia fruit, Behbahan
