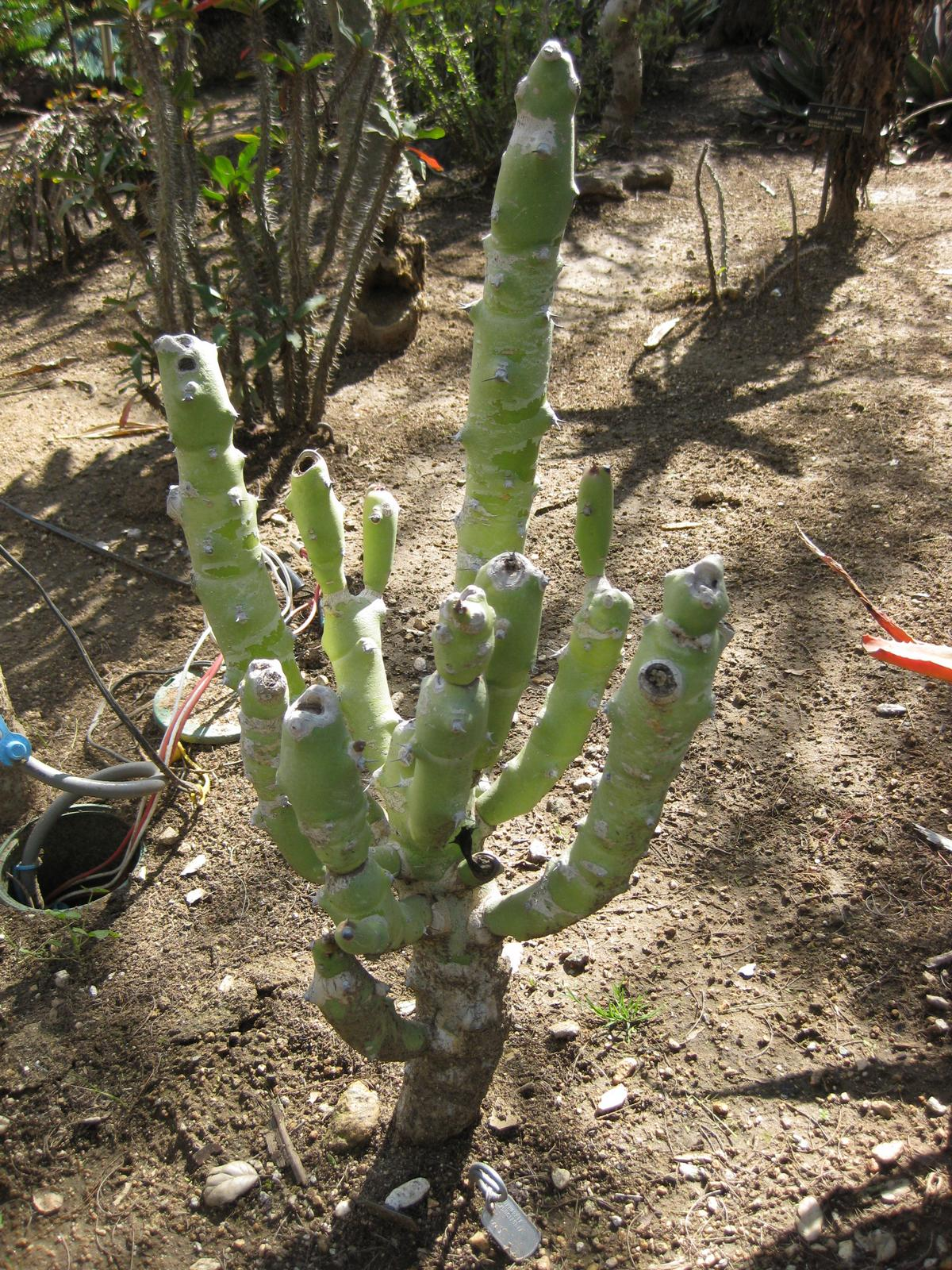

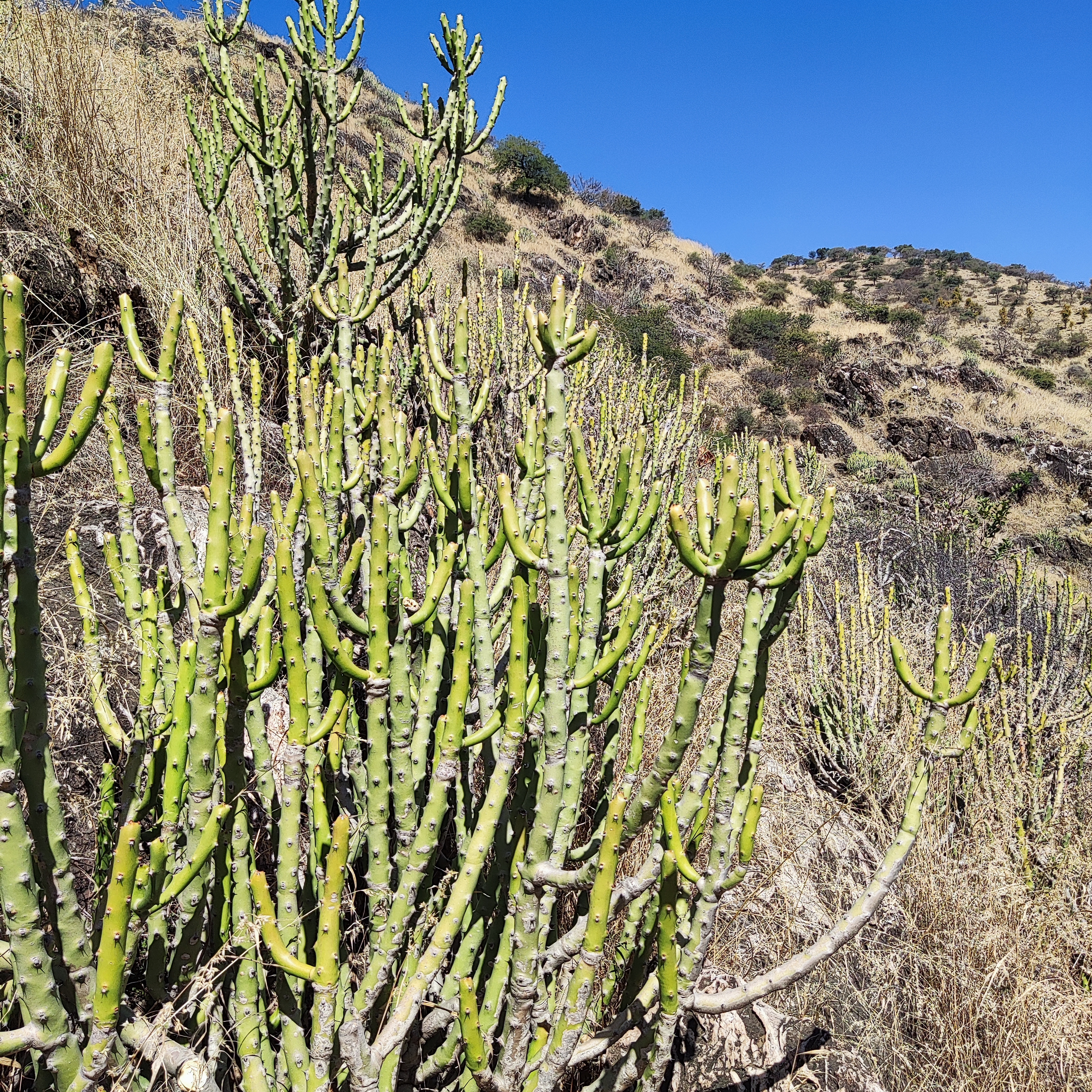
- Taken in Udaipur, Rajasthan.

Scientific classification
- Kingdom: Plantae
- Clade: Embryophytes
- Clade: Tracheophytes
- Clade: Spermatophytes
- Clade: Angiosperms
- Clade: Eudicots
- Clade: Rosids
- Order: Malpighiales
- Family: Euphorbiaceae
- Genus: Euphorbia
- Species: E. caducifolia

Binomial name
- Euphorbia caducifolia Haines

= Euphorbia caducifolia =

Species of succulent flowering plant

Euphorbia caducifolia is a subtropical succulent species of flowering plant in the spurge family Euphorbiaceae. It is found in the arid regions of northwestern Indian subcontinent. In India it is known as the leafless milk hedge.

== Description ==
Euphorbia caducifolia forms a dense, branching bush up to 3 m (10 ft) high and 10 m (33 ft) in diameter. The succulent stems branch frequently and tend to grow vertically. It has small oval leaves some 2.5 to 8 cm (1 to 3 in) long and 2.5 cm (1 in) wide, but these soon fall. Spines on the stipules are up to 1 cm (0.4 in) long. E. caducifolia resembles the leafy milk hedge (Euphorbia nivulia) but differs in having multiple stems, and smaller, more transitory leaves. The flowers are orange-red and appear in February and March.

== Distribution and habitat ==
Euphorbia caducifolia has a rather limited distribution in the Thar Desert in the northwestern part of the Indian subcontinent, on the boundary between India and Pakistan. This is an area of sandy hills and shifting sand dunes, with clumps of thorny vegetation, low trees, grasses and scrub.

== Ecology ==
In southern Rajasthan, many of the hills are well-clad with vegetation, and there, Euphorbia caducifolia is associated with Butea monosperma, Millettia pinnata, Syzygium hyrianium, Wrightia tinctoria and Ziziphus nummularia. In the arid region near Sambhar Salt Lake, it is associated with thorny scrub such as Anogeissus pendula and Boswellia.

== Uses and toxicity ==
As with all Euphorbiaceae species, when broken or cut, the tissue of Euphorbia caducifolia bleeds a profuse white, latex-like, phorbol-containing sap (among other alkaloids) which may be particularly painful if contact is made with mucous membranes—such as in the eyes, mouth or nose, or if it drips into a fresh cut. If sap dries on one's bare hands and it is not promptly washed off, care must be taken not to touch the eyes or mouth. Accidental ingestion of the plant can produce untold gastrointestinal effects.

However, despite its irritating and potentially poisonous qualities, it has long been used in Pakistan as an anti-tumour agent, and the roots are also said to have similar anti-tumour properties. Interestingly, the plant's latex has also been used to promote the healing of wounds, and research has shown that it does indeed exhibit significant wound healing activity, likely due to the hardening of the latex sap as it dries when exposed to air. The plant is also a rich source of hydrocarbons (C-15 compounds) that can be processed to produce a biodiesel fuel.
