= Nara Desert =

Desert in Sindh, Pakistan

The Nara Desert is an extension of the Thar Desert situated in the Sindh province of Pakistan. Nara is the northeastern part of the Thar Desert of Sindh. It primarily occupies the Khairpur district and a few parts of Sanghar District. It covers an area of approximately 23,000 km^{2} and is composed of sandy hills, steep slopes, and extensive low-lying regions, referred to locally as "Patt (پَٽ)".

== Climate ==
Nara is a sandy desert characterized by hot arid to semiarid conditions having average minimum and maximum temperatures of 20°C and 45°C, respectively. The hottest months occur between May and July, with temperatures ranging from 47° to 51°C. The lowest temperature, recorded at 20°–28°C, is typically observed in January. The Nara Desert is characterized by aridity, and wet and dry years tend to occur in clusters. The mean annual rainfall varies from 88 to 135 mm, with the majority received during the monsoon period (mid-July to the end of August). Winter showers, of low intensity, take place from December through March. Water scarcity is a prominent feature of the Nara Desert, with limited water supplies constraining agricultural activities. Groundwater resources are also restricted, typically found at depths of 50–300 feet from the surface. The primary source of water for both humans and livestock is derived from dugout/natural ponds that store rainwater during the monsoon season.

== Bibliography ==
- Bhatti, G. Raza; Qureshi, Rahmatullah (1 January 2005). "Nara Desert, Pakistan. Part I: Soils, Climate, and Vegetation". Rangelands. 27 (5): 27–31. ISSN 0190-0528.
- Ozturk, Munir; Hakeem, Khalid Rehman (2018). "Ethnobotany of Medicinal Plants for Livelihood and Community Health in Deserts of Sindh-Pakistan". Plant and Human Health, Volume 1: Ethnobotany and Physiology. Springer International Publishing. pp. 767–791. ISBN 978-3-319-93996-4.
