= Thar Desert of Sindh =

Desert in Sindh, Pakistan

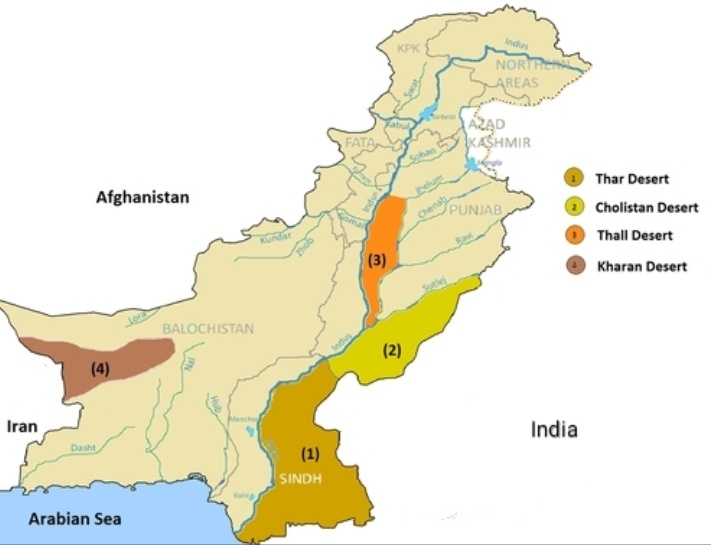
Thar Desert of Sindh (1), Cholistan Desert (2), Thall Desert(3), Kharan Desert(4)

The Thar Desert of Sindh is a desert situated in Sindh, the southeastern region of Pakistan.

This desert, forming a part of the expansive Thar Desert, spans across the province of Sindh, contributing to the aridity prevalent in this southeastern expanse. It is a notable geographic feature characterized by its arid landscape and challenging environmental conditions.

The Thar Desert of Sindh is divided into Nara, Achro, and Thar, all situated in the southern part of Sindh.

Historical records indicate that the normal monsoon is around 127.5 mm, but it reached a maximum of 443.9 mm in 2011 due to sudden climatic changes. Water scarcity is prevalent in many areas, leading to limitations in agriculture. Groundwater can be found at depths ranging from 50 to 300 feet, with variations in salt concentration. Ponds, dugouts, and tanks filled during monsoon rainfall serve as the most favorable and accessible sources of water.

Hindus and Muslims collectively form the two main ethnic groups across the Sindh deserts, with Hindus constituting 62% of the population and Muslims representing 38%. Major events including Holi, Diwali or Deepawali, Krishna Janmashtami, and Maha Shivaratri. Thari music is widely celebrated for its popularity, impressiveness, and uniqueness.

== Bibliography ==
- Ozturk, Munir; Hakeem, Khalid Rehman (2018). "Ethnobotany of Medicinal Plants for Livelihood and Community Health in Deserts of Sindh-Pakistan". Plant and Human Health, Volume 1: Ethnobotany and Physiology. Springer International Publishing. pp. 767–791. ISBN 978-3-319-93996-4.
