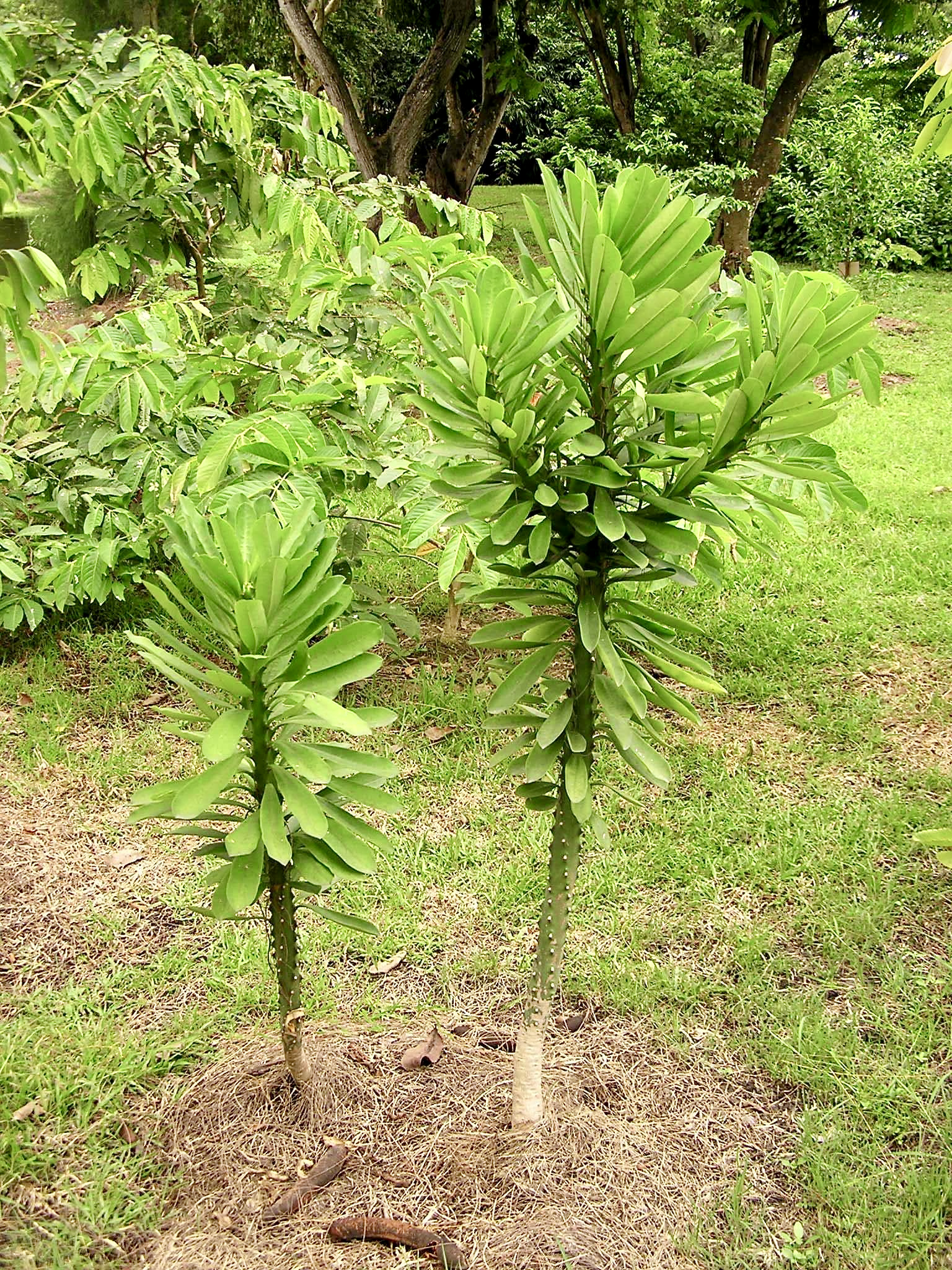

Scientific classification
- Kingdom: Plantae
- Clade: Embryophytes
- Clade: Tracheophytes
- Clade: Spermatophytes
- Clade: Angiosperms
- Clade: Eudicots
- Clade: Rosids
- Order: Malpighiales
- Family: Euphorbiaceae
- Genus: Euphorbia
- Species: E. nivulia

Binomial name
- Euphorbia nivulia Buch.-Ham.

Synonyms
- Euphorbia neriifolia Roxb.; Euphorbia helicothele

= Euphorbia nivulia =

Species of succulent flowering plant

Euphorbia nivulia is a subtropical succulent species of flowering plant in the family Euphorbiaceae. It is found in the Indian subcontinent and is commonly known as the leafy milk hedge, holy milk hedge or dog's tongue.

== Description ==
Euphorbia nivulia forms a small tree up to 9 m (30 ft) high and 1 m (3 ft) in girth. The bark is rough and thick. The branches are succulent, and grow out from the trunk at an obtuse angle. Spirally arranged tubercles on the branches bear clusters of sharp spines. The leaves are simple and arranged alternately, and have a very short or no stalk. The leaf blade is obovate and spoon-shaped to inverted-lance-shaped, up to 25 cm (10 in) long and 8 cm (3 in) wide. They are thick and fleshy, the tip is rounded, the base is tapered, and the margin is entire. The midrib is prominent on the underside of the leaf. The reddish cyathia (false flowers found in the genus Euphorbia) develop in groups of three in the axils of the leaves towards the ends of the branches. The fruits are divided into three parts, the lobes being compressed laterally. The seeds are four-angled and ovoid, smooth and about 4 mm (0.16 in) long. This plant is similar to Euphorbia caducifolia, leafless milk hedge, but it retains its leaves for longer than does E. caducifolia, and does not form bushy thickets.

== Distribution and habitat ==
Euphorbia nivulia is native to Pakistan, India, Sri Lanka, Bangladesh and Myanmar. It grows in both wet and dry deciduous forests on rocky hillsides, and also in dry, barren areas; it is planted as a hedge plant in agricultural areas.

== Uses ==
Juice squeezed from the leaves, bark from the root, the stems and the latex have been used in traditional medicine. Research has shown that the plant possesses antimicrobial, wound healing, haemostatic and cytotoxic activity. Additionally, it possesses larvicidal, insecticidal and nematicidal activities, and may prove useful in controlling the mosquitoes, Aedes aegypti and Culex quinquefasciatus, and suppressing the root-knot nematode, (Meloidogyne incognita).
