= Thar (Sindh) =

Linguistic and Cultural Region of Sindh

Thar or Tharu ٿَرُ (Sindhi)
- Region
- Country: Pakistan
- Province: Sindh

Languages
  - Main language: Sindhi
- Time zone: UTC+5 (PST)

Map of Mirpur Khas Division in Sindh, locally called the Thar region.

Thar (Sindhi: ٿَرُ) also known as the Tharu is a geographical, cultural and linguistic region in eastern Sindh. It comprises the eastern plains of Sindh bordering India and includes the districts of Tharparkar, Mirpurkhas and Umerkot, along with the eastern parts of Sanghar District. The region is distinct from the Thar Desert, as it refers to the broader historical and cultural region rather than the desert itself. The dialect of Sindhi spoken in Thar is commonly known as Thari.

== History ==
Thar has been under Soomras, Samma Mughals and Talpurs. The Soomra dynasty had their important town of Umarkot at Thar from where they used to govern over the rest of Thar. There was a small power of Makwanas or Jhalas in Thar whose king Keesar had bad relations with Soomras, his son started a rebellion against Soomras but lost and fled into Gujarat. After Soomra power weakened the Sodhas got control over Thar but the Soomras defeated them again and in the end Soomras got Southern Thar while northern Thar was under Sodhas. Later, the Sodhas were displaced, and the Mughals took over the administration. Ultimately, the Talpurs took control and brought the region under their firm rule for 40 years. To strengthen their governance and secure tax collection, they constructed several forts across Thar. They rebuilt old forts and established a network of defensive outposts, dividing Thar into two halves for strategic defense and administrative management.

== Lifestyle ==
The people of Thar live in the harsh environment of the Thar Desert, therefore they spend a considerable amount of time fetching water for themselves or their animals. They marry early, often during teenage years. They wake up early and herd the animals with the females waking up earlier than the men. The people of Thar are known for their carpet industry, and earlier in history they used to make shawls. The Thari also celebrate Lok Mela.

== Religious Harmony ==
Thar of Sindh is widely noted for its tradition of religious coexistence between its Muslim and Hindu communities. The region contains numerous religious and historical sites of both faiths, including the Bhodesar Mosque, the Jain temples at Nagarparkar, and the Kali Mata Temple near the Karoonjhar Mountains. Thar has been always regarded as a region of Sindh which is a centre of interfaith harmony, where members of different religious communities have traditionally lived together and participated in each other's cultural and religious celebrations.

Tharis greet each other with 'saein kera haal ha", which translates to ‘brother how are you’, rather than using standard religious greetings such as ‘Namaste’ or ‘Assalam-o-Alaikum’.

== Language ==
The language spoken in thar is the Thari dialect of Sindhi while many people speak Dhatki and Kutchi Dialects.

== See Also ==
- Thar Desert of Sindh
- Thari people
- Mirpur Khas District
- Tharparkar
- Umerkot
- Dhatki language
- Larr (Region)
