= Tharis =

Ethnolinguistic group in Sindh, Pakistan and Rajasthan, India

Tharis Dhati
ٿري ڍاٽي
- Map of Mirpur Khas Division (locally known as Thar Region) where Thari people live

Regions with significant populations

Languages
- Dhatki, Sindhi, Marwari

Religion
- Islam and Hinduism

Related ethnic groups
- Kutchi, Rajasthani, Jadgal, Sindhi

Dhat region of Sindh and Rajasthan where Dhati people live
- Cultural region of Sindh and Rajasthan
- Map

The Thari people, also known as Tharis, are the regional inhabitants of the Thar region primarily concentrated in the Tharparkar and Umerkot districts of Sindh.

== Lifestyle and culture ==
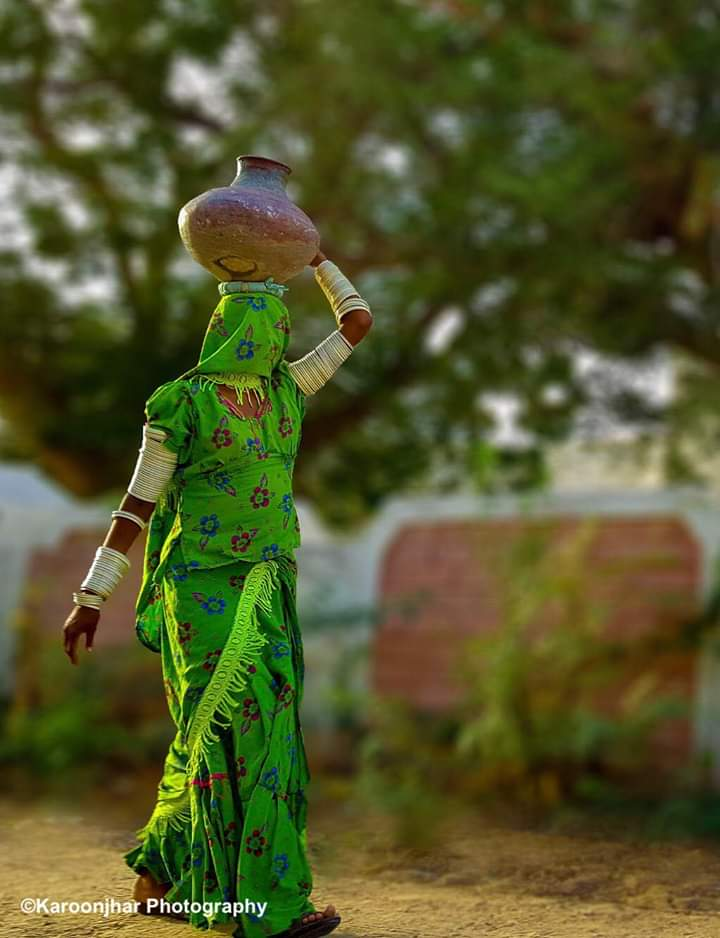
Thari woman

The Thar live in the harsh environment of the Thar Desert, therefore they spend a considerable amount of time fetching water for themselves or their animals. The Thari marry early, often during teenage years. They wake up early and herd the animals with the women waking up earlier than the men. The Thari are known for their carpet industry, and earlier in history they used to make shawls. The Thari also celebrate Lok Mela.

The Thari have suffered throughout history due to the environment they live in, but as the world progresses into a new era, the Tharis have been suffering even more with no cars or phones. The music of the Thari is regarded as Rajsthani music with a "little spice" to it.The ethnobotany of plants used by the Thari people has been considered effective by scientists.

The Thari, whether Muslim or Hindu, have always been peaceful to each other.

== Clothing ==
The clothing of the Thar is a mix of Rajasthani and Sindhi clothing, as well as a small influence of Gujarati. The Thari women wear Ghagra choli, with the Thari men wearing a turban and sometimes wearing a Shalwar Qameez. During funerals, Thari women wear bangles and Thari men wear black dresses.

== Language ==
The Tharis people speak Dhatki, Sindhi, Marwari and various other languages.

== Notable people ==
Notable Thari people include:

1. Mai Bhaghi, A Thari woman who sang in Sindhi and Urdu
2. Fozia Soomro, A Thari Singer
3. Vasand Thari, A Thari singer, poet, and journalist
4. Mai Dhai, A Thari singer
5. Rana Ratan Singh, Thari activist during British rule

== See also ==
- Dhatki or Thari language
