= Thari language =

Indo-Aryan language of India

Thari
- ٿَري ٽڪي
- The word Thari (top) and Dhatki (bottom) written in the Naskh script
- Native to: Pakistan (Tharparkar and Umerkot districts of Sindh); India (Jaisalmer and Barmer districts of Rajasthan)
- Ethnicity: Tharis
- Native speakers: 1,800,000 (2024)
- Language family: Indo-European: Indo-Iranian; Indo-Aryan; Western; Rajasthani; Thari
- Writing system: Arabic script, Devanagari, Mahajani

Language codes
- ISO 639-3: mki
- Glottolog: dhat1238

Dhat region of Sindh and Rajasthan where Dhatki is spoken
- Cultural region of Sindh and Rajasthan
- Map

Thari (ٿَري), also known as Dhatki (ڍاٽڪي), is an Indo-Aryan language that is a part of the Rajasthanic family. It is predominantly spoken by the Thari people in the Thar region, specifically the Tharparkar and Umerkot districts of Sindh, where it is the majority language. Thari is also spoken to a lesser extent in the Barmer and Jaisalmer districts of Rajasthan. The Thari language is spoken by around 1.8 million in the region.

== Speakers ==
Thari is considered either related to Sindhi, or Rajasthani (Marwari). Omniglot classifies Dhatki as a Western Rajasthani dialect. Dhatki dialects are divided into two groups Western Dhatki and Eastern Dhatki. Western Dhatki is spoken in Tharparkar, Pakistan while Eastern Dhatki is spoken along Indo-Pakistan border in Jaisalmer and Barmer districts of India. Dhatki dialects and their names are based on the regions in Tharpakar which Include: Muhrano and Samroti etc.

Speakers of the Thari/Dhatki language can be ethnically Rajasthani, Thari, Sindhi and Gujarati, the Thari language unites these ethnically diverse groups under one mother tongue and under one umbrella. Some Thari-speaking communities migrated to India in 1947 after the independence and continued to do so in small numbers after that date, but the great majority of Thari speakers still reside in Pakistan.

The majority speakers of Thari language live in Umerkot District and Tharparkar District in Sindh, Pakistan. 60% of the language's speakers are Muslims, 35% are Hindu and the remaining 5% practice traditional folk religions.

Prominent communities that speak the Dhatki language:

- Kumhar
- Maheshwari
- Rajput
- Rajpurohit
- Charan
- Sodha
- Rahimoon
- Sameja
- Samma
- Ramdiya
- Abda
- Aarisar
- Junejo
- Maniyar (Mangneyar)
- Khatri
- Malhi
- Suthar
- Bajir
- Sonar
- Meghwal
- Bheel
- Harijan
- Garasia

== Phonology ==
Thari has implosive consonants, unlike other closely related Rajasthani languages but like the neighbouring (but more distantly related) Sindhi language. It is likely that these consonants developed in the language from contact with more culturally dominant Sindhi speakers. Aside from this, its phonology is much like other Indo-Aryan languages:

Dhakti consonants
		Labial	Dental/ Alveolar	Retroflex	Palatal	Velar	Uvular	Glottal
Nasal		m	n	ɳ^{1}	(ɲ)^{1}	(ŋ)^{1}		
Plosive/ Affricate	voiceless	p	t̪	ʈ	tʃ	k	(q)^{1}	
Plosive/ Affricate	voiceless aspirated	pʰ	t̪ʰ	ʈʰ	tʃʰ	kʰ		
Plosive/ Affricate	voiced	b	d̪	ɖ	dʒ	ɡ		
Plosive/ Affricate	voiced aspirated	bʱ	d̪ʱ	ɖʱ	dʒʱ	ɡʱ		
Implosive	voiced	ɓ	ɗ		ʄ	ɠ		
Fricative	voiceless	f	s	ʂ^{1}	ʃ	x^{1}		
Fricative	voiced		z			(ɣ)^{1,2}		ɦ
Flap	plain		ɾ	ɽ^{1}				
Flap	voiced aspirated			(ɽʱ)^{1}				
Approximant		ʋ	l	ɭ	j			

Notes

1. Marginal and non-universal phonemes are in parentheses. /ɽ/ is lateral [ɺ̢] for some speakers (Masica 1991:98).
2. /ɣ/ is post-velar.

Thari has a fairly standard set of vowels for an Indo-Aryan language: [ə aː ɪ iː ʊ (sometimes: u) uː eː oː ɛː ɔː]. The vowel ʊ may be realized as a short u and the vowel ɪ may be realized as a short i. The vowel ɛː is often realized as the diphthong əiː based and context or as an æː based on the speaker's accent. The vowel ɔː is often realized as the diphthong əuː based and context. Nazalized vowels occur word finally in Thari, they are: [ĩː ẽː ɛ̃ː ɑ̃ː ɔ̃ː õː ũː].

== Samples ==
A few of the typical sentences in Thari are:

- [tu ki karen to?] "What are you doing?", [Hoon Ayye page parhan pio] "I am reading this Page.",
- [tayo naam ki aheyy?] "What is your name?",
- [mina roti khani aheyy] "I have to eat" (Literally translates to "I have to eat roti).
- [tu kith jaeen to?] "where are you going? [Kithe Konhi] "Nowhere.",
- [tu kein aheen?] "How are you?". [Hoon Theek Ahan] "I am Fine",

{Tu Kun aheen?}-"who are you?"

English	Dhatki	Sindhi	Marwari
I	Hu(n)	Ma(n)/Aao(n)	Mai(n)
You (informal)	Tu(n)	Tu(n)	Tu
My	Mahyo/Mahajo	Munjo	Mahro
Your	Tahyo/Tahajo	Tunjo	Tharo
What	Ki	Chha	Kaain
Name	Naam	Nav/Nalo	Naam
To look	Jovan/Disan	Disan	Jovan
Go	Ja	Wanj	Jawo
