= Mirpur Khas Division =

Administrative division of Sindh

Coordinates: 25.4556°N 69.4088°E

Mirpur Khas Division (Thar Division)
- Division
- Map of Mirpur Khas Division
- Country: Pakistan
- Province: Sindh
- Capital: Mirpur Khas
- Established: 1990

Government
  - Type: Divisional Administration
  - Commissioner: Subhash Chander
  - Regional Police Officer: N/A

Area
  - Division: 28,171 km^{2} (10,877 sq mi)

Population (2023)
  - Division: 4,619,624
  - Density: 163.99/km^{2} (424.72/sq mi)
  - Urban: 895,439 (19.38%)
  - Rural: 3,724,185

Literacy (2023)
  - Literacy rate: Total: (40.41%); Male: (51.70%); Female: (28.18%)
- Postal code: 69000

Mirpur Khas Division (Sindhi: ميرپورخاص ڊويزن) is an administrative division in the Thar Region of the Sindh Province of Pakistan. It was abolished in 2000 but restored again on 11 July 2011. formerly a part of Hyderabad Division. CNIC code of Mirpur Khas Division is 44.

Mirpur Khas is the divisional headquarter of Mirpur Khas Division. It comprises the following three districts;

== Demographics ==
=== Population ===
Historical population
Year	Pop.	±% p.a.
1951	...	—
1961	...	—
1972	...	—
1981	1,501,882	—
1998	2,585,417	+3.25%
2017	4,228,683	+2.62%
2023	4,619,624	+1.48%

According to 2023 census, Sukkur division had a population of 4,619,624, roughly equal to the population of Oman or the US state of Oregon.

=== Religion ===
Religions in Mirpur Khas Division (2023)
Religion	Percent
Islam	53.14%
Hinduism	46.37%
Other or not stated	0.49%

The Mir Khas Pur division had a population of 4,228,683 as per 2017 Census of Pakistan. The Muslim population is 2,324,929 (54.98%), and the Hindu population is 1,892,758 (44.76%).

== List of the Districts ==
#	District	Headquarter	Area (km^{2})	Pop. (2023)	Density (ppl/km^{2}) (2023)	Lit. rate (2023)
1	Mirpur Khas	Mirpur Khas	2,925	1,681,386	574.7	45.37%
2	Umerkot	Umerkot	5,608	1,159,831	207.2	38.69%
3	Tharparkar	Mithi	19,637	1,778,407	90.6	36.39%

== List of the Tehsils ==
Tehsil	Area (km^{2})	Population (2023)	Density (ppl/km^{2}) (2023)	Literacy rate (2023)	Districts
Digri Tehsil	572	234,578	410.10	46.10%	Mirpur Khas District
Hussain Bux Mari Tehsil	209	172,143	823.70	33.26%	Mirpur Khas District
Jhuddo Tehsil	363	230,285	634.39	38.59%	Mirpur Khas District
Kot Ghulam Muhammad Tehsil	762	310,142	407.01	41.19%	Mirpur Khas District
Mirpur Khas Tehsil	24	287,802	11,991.75	74.63%	Mirpur Khas District
Shujabad Tehsil	396	185,654	468.82	39.46%	Mirpur Khas District
Sindhri Tehsil	599	260,782	435.36	31.99%	Mirpur Khas District
Chachro Tehsil	3,386	371,769	109.80	31.07%	Tharparkar District
Dahli Tehsil	2,126	326,034	153.36	31.47%	Tharparkar District
Diplo Tehsil	2,872	163,119	56.80	46.10%	Tharparkar District
Kaloi Tehsil	922	129,677	140.65	37.91%	Tharparkar District
Islamkot Tehsil	3,515	265,643	75.57	36.01%	Tharparkar District
Mithi Tehsil	2,954	239,091	80.94	49.84%	Tharparkar District
Nagarparkar Tehsil	3,862	283,074	73.30	29.49%	Tharparkar District
Kunri Tehsil	585	237,063	405.24	38.72%	Umerkot District
Pithoro Tehsil	855	130,383	152.49	39.90%	Umerkot District
Samaro Tehsil	959	184,051	191.92	29.72%	Umerkot District
Umerkot Tehsil	3,209	608,334	189.57	41.00%	Umerkot District

== Constituencies ==
Provincial Assembly Constituency	National Assembly Constituency	District
PS-45 Mirpur Khas-I	NA-211 Mirpur Khas-I	Mirpur Khas
PS-46 Mirpur Khas-II	NA-211 Mirpur Khas-I	Mirpur Khas
PS-47 Mirpur Khas-III	NA-212 Mirpur Khas-II	Mirpur Khas
PS-48 Mirpur Khas-IV	NA-212 Mirpur Khas-II	Mirpur Khas
PS-49 Umerkot-I	NA-213 Umerkot	Umerkot
PS-50 Umerkot-II	NA-213 Umerkot	Umerkot
PS-51 Umerkot-III	NA-213 Umerkot	Umerkot
PS-52 Tharparkar-I	NA-214 Tharparkar-I	Tharparkar
PS-53 Tharparkar-II	NA-214 Tharparkar-I	Tharparkar
PS-54 Tharparkar-III	NA-215 Tharparkar-II	Tharparkar
PS-55 Tharparkar-IV	NA-215 Tharparkar-II	Tharparkar
