= NA-212 Mirpur Khas-II =

Constituency of the National Assembly of Pakistan

- Constituency for the National Assembly of Pakistan
- Region: Kot Ghulam Muhammad, Digri and Jhuddo Tehsils and Shujaabad Tehsil (partly) of Mirpur Khas District
- Electorate: 432,341

Current constituency
- Party: Pakistan People's Party
- Member(s): Mir Munawar Ali Talpur
- Created from: NA-227 Mirpur Khas-II

NA-212 Mirpur Khas-II (این اے-212، میرپور خاص-2) is a constituency for the National Assembly of Pakistan.

== Assembly Segments ==
Constituency number	Constituency	District	Current MPA	Party
47	PS-47 Mirpur Khas-III	Mirpur Khas District	Noor Ahmed Bhurgri	PPP
48	PS-48 Mirpur Khas-IV	Mirpur Khas District	Mir Tariq Ali Khan Talpur	PPP

== Members of Parliament ==
=== 2018–2023: NA-219 Mirpur Khas-II ===
Election	Member	Party
2018	Mir Munawar Ali	PPPP

=== 2024–present: NA-212 Mirpur Khas-II ===
Election	Member	Party
2024	Mir Munawar Ali	PPPP

== Election 2002 ==
General elections were held on 10 October 2002. Syed Qurban Ali Shah of PPP won by 56,627 votes.

General election 2002: NA-227 Mirpur Khas-II
Party	Candidate	Votes	%	±%
PPP	Syed Qurban Ali Shah	56,627	52.97	
MQM	Shabbir Qaimkhani	21,117	19.75	
NA	Shah Nawaz	11,526	10.78	
PML(N)	Mukhdoom Shah Nawaz	10,850	10.15	
MMA	Mohammed Umer Khan Qaim Khani	3,149	2.95	
PML(F)	Dr. Naeem Ahmed Khan	2,736	2.56	
Others	Others (eight candidates)	902	0.84	
Turnout		110,238	42.41	
Total valid votes		106,907	96.98	
Rejected ballots		3,331	3.02	
Majority		35,510	33.22	
Registered electors		259,929		

== Election 2008 ==
General elections were held on 18 February 2008. Mir Munawar Ali Talpur of PPP won by 82,697 votes.

General election 2008: NA-227 Mirpur Khas-II
Party	Candidate	Votes	%	±%
PPP	Mir Munawar Ali Talpur	82,697	66.19	
PML(Q)	Syed Qurban Ali Shah	31,159	24.94	
PML(N)	Sardar Ghulam Mustafa Khaskheli	10,359	8.29	
Others	Others (fourteen candidates)	718	0.58	
Turnout		129,987	39.17	
Total valid votes		124,933	96.11	
Rejected ballots		5,054	3.89	
Majority		51,538	41.25	
Registered electors		331,844		
PPP hold				

== Election 2013 ==
General elections were held on 11 May 2013. Mir Munawar Ali Talpur of PPP won by 113,218 votes and became the member of National Assembly.

General election 2013: NA-227 Mirpur Khas-II
Party	Candidate	Votes	%	±%
PPP	Mir Munawar Ali Talpur	113,218	66.63	
PML(F)	Syed Inayat Ali Shah	33,723	19.85	
Independent	Arbab Inayatullah Ghulam Rahim	7,198	4.24	
Others	Others (twenty one candidates)	15,776	9.28	
Turnout		180,464	60.21	
Total valid votes		169,915	94.16	
Rejected ballots		10,549	5.84	
Majority		79,495	46.78	
Registered electors		299,736		
PPP hold				

== Election 2018 ==
General elections were held on 25 July 2018.

General election 2018: NA-219 Mirpurkhas-II
Party	Candidate	Votes	%	±%
PPP	Mir Munawar Ali Talpur	105,823	60.26	
GDA	Arbab Ghulam Rahim	51,145	29.13	
Others	Others (seven candidates)	18,637	10.61	
Turnout		184,603	53.39	
Total valid votes		175,605	95.13	
Rejected ballots		8,998	4.87	
Majority		54,678	31.13	
Registered electors		345,734		
PPP hold		Swing	N/A	

== Election 2024 ==
Elections were held on 8 February 2024. Mir Munawar Ali Talpur won the election with 122,291 votes.

General election 2024: NA-212 Mirpur Khas-II
Party	Candidate	Votes	%	±%
PPP	Mir Munawar Ali Talpur	122,291	62.11	▲1.85
Independent	Syed Ali Nawaz Shah Rizvi	45,359	23.04	▲17.49
PTI	Faisal Kachelo	20,979	10.66	
Others	Others (seven candidates)	8,252	4.19	
Turnout		204,815	47.37	▼6.02
Total valid votes		196,881	96.13	
Rejected ballots		7,934	3.87	
Majority		76,932	39.08	▲7.95
Registered electors		432,341		
PPP hold				

== See also ==
- NA-211 Mirpur Khas-I
- NA-213 Umerkot
