= NA-211 Mirpur Khas-I =

Constituency of the National Assembly of Pakistan

- Constituency for the National Assembly of Pakistan
- Region: Hussain Bux Marri, Sindhri and Mirpur Khas Tehsils and Shujaabad Tehsil (partly) of Mirpur Khas District
- Electorate: 433,059

Current constituency
- Party: Pakistan People's Party
- Member: Aftab Hussain Shah Jillani
- Created from: NA-226 Mirpur Khas-I

NA-211 Mirpur Khas-I (این اے-211، میرپور خاص-۱) is a constituency for the National Assembly of Pakistan.

== Assembly Segments ==
| Constituency number | Constituency | District | Current MPA | Party |
|---|---|---|---|---|
| 45 | PS-45 Mirpur Khas-I | Mirpur Khas District | Hari Ram | PPP |
| 46 | PS-46 Mirpur Khas-II | Mirpur Khas District | Syed Zulfiqar Ali Shah | PPP |

== Members of Parliament ==
=== 2018–2023: NA-218 Mirpur Khas-I ===
| Election | Member | Party |
|---|---|---|
| 2018 | Syed Ali Nawaz Shah Rizvi | IND |

=== 2024–present: NA-211 Mirpur Khas-I ===
| Election | Member | Party |
|---|---|---|
| 2024 | Aftab Hussain Shah Jillani | PPP |

== Election 2002 ==
General elections were held on 10 October 2002. Pir Aftab Hussain Shah Jilani of PPP won by 63,638 votes.

General election 2002: NA-226 Mirpur Khas-I
| Party | Candidate | Votes | % | ±% |
|---|---|---|---|---|
| PPP | Pir Aftab Hussain Shah Jilani | 63,638 | 55.19 | |
| MQM | Rais Ahmed Khan | 35,221 | 30.54 | |
| MMA | Mushtaque Ahmed Naqshbandi | 5,610 | 4.87 | |
| PML(F) | Muzzaffar Ali Leghari | 4,127 | 3.58 | |
| PML(Q) | Abdul Ghaffar Qureshi | 4,077 | 3.54 | |
| Others | Others (six candidates) | 2,638 | 2.28 | |
| Turnout | | 117,830 | 45.12 | |
| Total valid votes | | 115,311 | 97.86 | |
| Rejected ballots | | 2,519 | 2.14 | |
| Majority | | 28,417 | 24.65 | |
| Registered electors | | 261,129 | | |

== Election 2008 ==
General elections were held on 18 February 2008. Pir Aftab Hussain Shah Jilani of PPP won by 78,543 votes.

General election 2008: NA-226 Mirpur Khas-I
| Party | Candidate | Votes | % | ±% |
|---|---|---|---|---|
| PPP | Pir Aftab Hussain Shah Jilani | 78,543 | 54.57 | |
| MQM | Khursheed Ahmed Siddiqui | 38,309 | 26.62 | |
| PML(F) | Fakir Ghulam Nabi Mangrio | 26,385 | 18.33 | |
| Others | Others (eleven candidates) | 697 | 0.48 | |
| Turnout | | 148,118 | 41.74 | |
| Total valid votes | | 143,934 | 97.18 | |
| Rejected ballots | | 4,184 | 2.82 | |
| Majority | | 40,234 | 27.95 | |
| Registered electors | | 354,831 | | |
| PPP hold | | | | |

== Election 2013 ==
General elections were held on 11 May 2013. Pir Shafqat Hussain Shah Jilani of PPP won by 82,017 votes and became the member of National Assembly.

General election 2013: NA-226 Mirpur Khas-I
| Party | Candidate | Votes | % | ±% |
|---|---|---|---|---|
| PPP | Pir Shafqat Hussain Shah Jilani | 82,017 | 44.14 | |
| PML(F) | Syed Qurban Ali Shah | 47,450 | 25.53 | |
| MQM | Shabbir Qaimkhani | 34,687 | 18.67 | |
| Independent | Zahid Hussain Mari | 9,022 | 4.86 | |
| MDM | Mohammad Akber | 7,842 | 4.22 | |
| Others | Others (eighteen candidates) | 4,810 | 2.88 | |
| Turnout | | 193,084 | 58.57 | |
| Total valid votes | | 185,828 | 96.24 | |
| Rejected ballots | | 7,256 | 3.76 | |
| Majority | | 34,567 | 18.61 | |
| Registered electors | | 329,640 | | |
| PPP hold | | | | |

== Election 2018 ==
General elections were held on 25 July 2018.

General election 2018: NA-218 Mirpurkhas-I
| Party | Candidate | Votes | % | ±% |
|---|---|---|---|---|
| Independent | Syed Ali Nawaz Shah Rizvi | 75,795 | 44.39 | |
| PPP | Pir Hassan Ali Shah | 67,552 | 39.56 | |
| Others | Others (thirteen candidates) | 27,392 | 16.05 | |
| Turnout | | 177,521 | 50.63 | |
| Total valid votes | | 170,739 | 96.18 | |
| Rejected ballots | | 6,782 | 3.82 | |
| Majority | | 8,243 | 4.83 | |
| Registered electors | | 350,604 | | |
| Independent gain from PPP | | | | |

== Election 2024 ==
Elections were held on 8 February 2024. Aftab Hussain Shah Jillani won the election with 84,512 votes.

General election 2024: NA-211 Mirpur Khas-I
| Party | Candidate | Votes | % | ±% |
|---|---|---|---|---|
| PPP | Aftab Hussain Shah Jillani | 84,512 | 46.48 | ▲6.92 |
| Independent | Syed Ali Nawaz Shah Rizvi | 53,881 | 29.64 | ▼14.75 |
| PTI | Abdul Haque (Note: Filed nomination papers as PTI candidate but ECP allowed him to run as an Independent) | 22,524 | 12.39 | ▲7.20 |
| Others | Others (fifteen candidates) | 20,894 | 11.49 | |
| Turnout | | 189,945 | 43.86 | ▼6.77 |
| Total valid votes | | 181,812 | 95.72 | |
| Rejected ballots | | 8,133 | 4.28 | |
| Majority | | 30,631 | 16.85 | |
| Registered electors | | 433,059 | | |
| PPP gain from PTI | | | | |

== See also ==
- NA-210 Sanghar-II
- NA-212 Mirpur Khas-II
