= Kot Ghulam Muhammad Tehsil =

Kot Ghulam Muhammad Bhurgri ڪوٽ غلام محمد ڀرڳڙئ
- Etymology: Jamesabad
- Location in Sindh Kot Ghulam Muhammad Bhurgri (Pakistan)
- Coordinates: 25°17′14″N 69°15′7″E
- Country: Pakistan
- Province: Sindh
- District: Mirpur Khas District
- Established: 1901; 125 years ago
- Founder: H. E. M. James

Area
  - City: 192,296 km^{2} (74,246 sq mi)
  - Urban: 3 km^{2} (1.2 sq mi)
- Elevation: 12 m (39 ft)

Population (2023)
  - City: 30,088
- Time zone: GMT + 5:00 PST
- Postal code: 69340
- Area code: 92(0233)

Kot Ghulam Muhammad (Sindhi: ڪوٽ غلام محمد) (formerly known as Jemesabad) is named after Ghulam Muhammad Khan Bhurgri, the Tehsil situated in south-east Mirpur Khas District of the Southern Province Sindh in Pakistan. Kot Ghlam Muhammad Bhurgri is situated west of Samaro and north of Digri. It is about 45 kilometres (28 mi) south of Mirpur Khas.

== History ==
Kot Ghulam Muhammad Bhurgri was formerly known as Jamesabad, it was named after Captain H. E. M. James for his services in the Battle of Miani in Hyderabad. During British rule the town was renamed as Jamesabad earlier called Samaro

The taluka of Jamesabad was part of the Bombay Presidency, lying between 24°50' and 25°28' N. and 69°14' and 69°35′E and had an area of 505 square miles (1,310 km^{2}). According to the 1901 census the population was 24,038 - an increase almost 5,000 since the 1891 (19,208). The density of 48 persons per square mile was considerably above the District average. The Taluka contained 184 villages, of which Jamesabad was headquarters. The land revenue and cesses 1903-4 amounted to 370,000.

The taluka has been renamed as Kot Ghulam Muhammad Bhurgri officially by Government of Sindh after Ghulam Muhammad Khan Bhurgari.

Ghulam Muhammad Khan Bhurgri is enlisted in Pioneers of Freedom for Pakistan. and was close friend to Mohammad Ali Jinnah the founder of Pakistan.

== Profile ==
Town is situated on Mirpurkhas loop and it is also connected by road with Mirpurkhas, being at 30 miles from Mirpurkhas.

Education

Kot Ghulam Muhammad city has got one Government Boys Higher Secondary School, Government Girls Higher Secondary School, Primary Boys /Girls Schools

In the Private sector, there are The Founders Institute, Ghazali Vision Higher Secondary School, Fauji Foundation Model School Kot Ghulam Muhammad, Akber Academy High School

Town has one High School managed by Sindh Education foundation (SEF)

Health

A Taluka headquarter hospital and many dispensaries and Basic Health Units are covering the health needs of the entire town area.

Though town is old one but it is well planned, almost all-street crosses are right angled, buildings are of pucca brick, and main roads are mettle and street bricks paved and C.C Roads.

Majority population of the Taluka lives in the rural areas, which are having the dearth of the ample sources of job avenues.

== Geography ==
The city of Kot Ghulam Muhammad Bhurgari is situated on right bank of Jamrao canal branch of Nara Canal coming from Indus River. The town situated on coordinates: 25°17′14"N 69°15′7"E.

Total area of Taluka is 192296 Sq:km.

Kot Ghlam Muhammad Bhurgari is situated in west of Taluka Samaro and north of Taluka Digri. It is about 45 kilometres (28 mi) south of Mirpur Khas.

== Demographics ==
Population

According to 2023 Pakistani census Kot Ghulam Muhammad Taluka had population of 309,901 up from 273,193 in 2017.

=== Language ===
Kot Ghulam Muhammad Taluka (2023)
1. Sindhi (81.3%)
2. Punjabi (5.62%)
3. Urdu (4.21%)
4. Balochi (0.78%)
5. Hindko (1.86%)
6. Saraiki (0.32%)
7. Mewati (1.44%)
8. Others (4.40%)

There were 252,043 Sindhi, 17,438 Punjabi, 13,068 Urdu, 5,791 Hindko, 4,478 Mewati, 2,420 Balochi, 1,003 Saraiki, 627 Pashto, 4 Brahui, & 13,027 other speakers in the taluka.

=== Religion ===
Religions in Kot Ghulam Muhammad Taluka (2023)
Religion	Percent
Hinduism	59.32%
Islam	40.53%
Other or not stated	0.15%

Hinduism is followed by majority of the tehsil's population. Muslims forms a significant minority.

== Administration ==
Union Councils/Wards Area and Estimated Population of Taluka/Town per Union Council

Now administratively Kot Ghulam Muhammad Bhurgari is subdivided into 14 Union Councils, after new delimitation by Election Commission of Pakistan.

Provisional census results for 2017 census

Sr.	STC	Headquarters	Provisional census results 2017
1	Kot Ghulam Muhammad STC	Kot Ghulam Muhammad	73244
2	Kot Ghulam Muhammad City	Kot Ghulam Muhammad	27833
3	Jawarisar STC	Jawarisar	56895
4	Khuddad STC	Khuddad	47287
5	Dengain Bhurgari STC	Dengain Bhurgari	67934

Provisional total Population of Kot Ghulam Muhammad Bhurgri is about having population 273,193.

== Economy ==
Majority population of Taluka lives in the rural areas, which are having the dearth of the ample sources of job avenues. Therefore are attached with agriculture and other seasonal crops.

Economically the status of common people comes under the poor class.

Kot Ghulam Muhammad Bhurgri economy is primarily based on agricultural, livestock and agribusiness or Agro Industries.

Crops like cotton, wheat, sugarcane, mango, banana, sapodilla or chikoo, Dundicut chillies and tomato are major agriculture products.

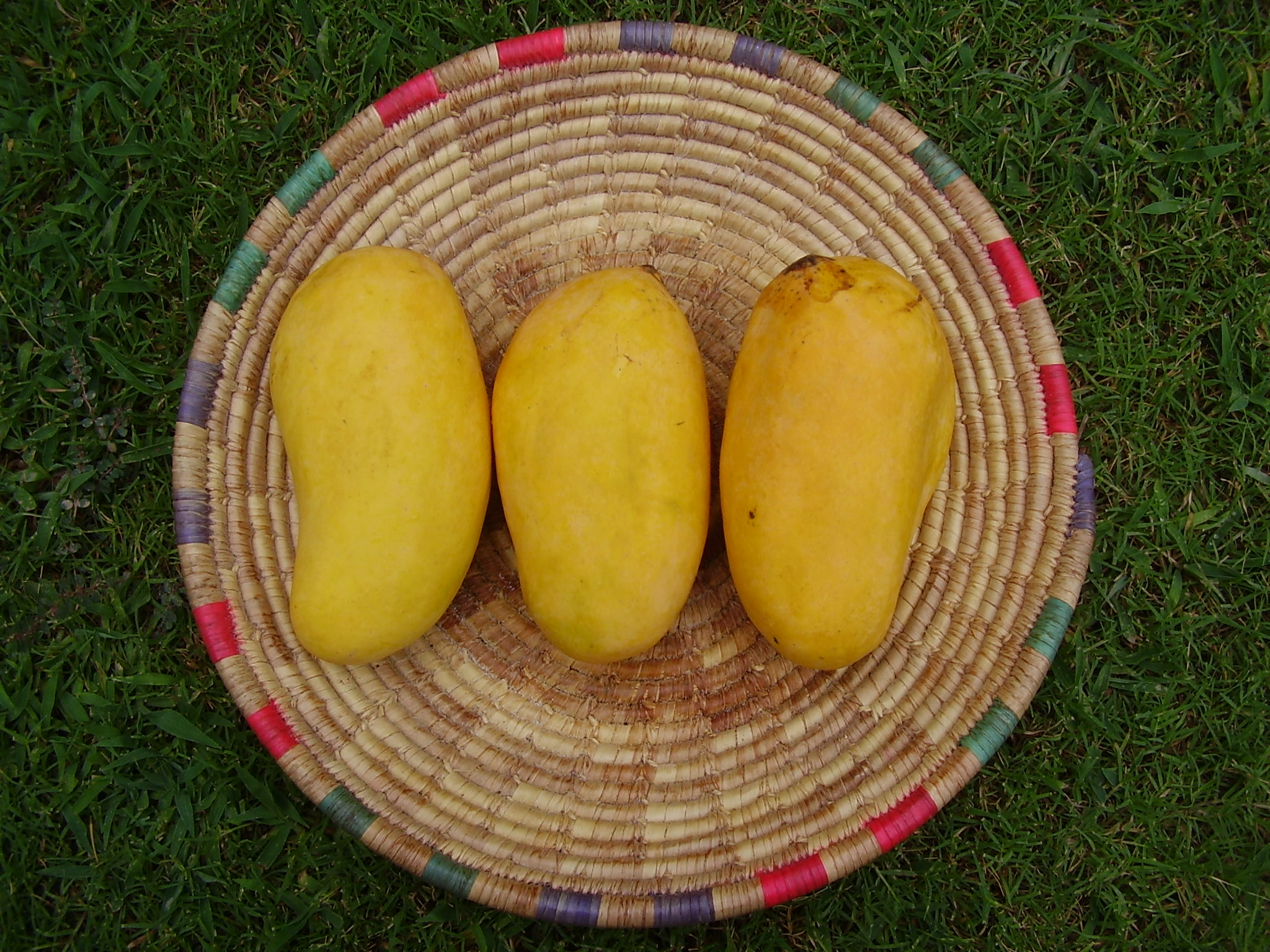
Sindhri origination in Mirpur Khas District is among top 10 mango varieties in the world

The main industries are agriculture based. The town has sugar mill, cotton factories. Tharparkar Sugar Mill Ltd is situated in the Kot Ghulam Muhammad Bhurgri town.

Like other talukas the Taluka of Kot Ghulam Muhammad Bhurgri is also agro based cum industrial area. It is having good network of cotton factories, floor mills, sugar Mil and ice factories. The majorities of population are engaged in agriculture and live stock fields. Where as some portion of population has access to transport, construction, wholesale and retail.

Renowned Agriculture farms in the town are Kachelo farms known as King of Mangoes.

Khair Mohammad Khan Bhurgri Mango farms, another grower from Mirpurkhas, after Kachhelos, who has developed a variety, which will produce fruit that extends the fruiting and harvesting season.

== Basic Services ==
The town has recently been installed with residential natural gas by Sui Southern Gas Company.

Electrical power is provided by HESCO Hyderabad Electric Supply Company a distribution company of Water and Power Development Authority.

Khair Muhammad Bhurgri 132-KV Grid Station has been installed at Kot Ghulam Muhammad.

1. Mobilink
2. Telenor
3. Ufone
4. Zong
5. Warid Pakistan

List of Government Medical faculties

TALUKA HOSPITAL, KOT GHULAM MUHAMMAD HOSPITAL

BHU KACHELO, DISPENSARY DISPENSARY

BHU KOT MIRS LANDHI BASIC HEALTH UNIT

BHU NAWAB COLONY BASIC HEALTH UNIT

BHU JHILURI BASIC HEALTH UNIT

BHU KACHELLO BASIC HEALTH UNIT

BHU MUHAMMAD HASHIM BHURGARI BASIC HEALTH UNIT

BHU BHUDIAL GARH BASIC HEALTH UNIT

BHU SIKRIYARI BASIC HEALTH UNIT

BHU UBEDULLAH BHURGARI BASIC HEALTH UNIT

BHU DENGAN BHURGARI BASIC HEALTH UNIT

== Government ==
Town Chairman Ali Hassan KaimKhani

Member Provincial Assembly of Sindh Raees Noor Ahmed Bhurgri

Member National Assembly (Pakistan) Mir Munawar Ali Talpur

== Gallery ==
Entrance Kot Ghulam Muhammad Bhurgri

Mango Orchard Village Ghous Bux Bhurgri, Kot Ghulam Muhammad Bhurgri

== See also ==
- Bhurgri
- Talpur
- Sant Nenuram Ashram
- Parbrahm Ashram
