= Hussain Bux Mari =

Tehsil in Mirpurkhas District, Sindh, Pakistan

Hussain Bux Mari Tehsil Sindhi: تعلقو حسين بخش ماري Hussain Bux Mari Taluka
- Tehsil of Mirpurkhas District
- Country: Pakistan
- Province: Sindh
- District: Mirpurkhas District
- Tehsil: Tehsil

Population (2023)
  - Total: 172,143
- Time zone: UTC+5 (PST)

Hussain Bux Mari Tehsil (also known as Hussain Bux Mari Taluka) is an administrative subdivision (tehsil) of Mirpurkhas District in the province of Sindh, Pakistan. It was established in December 2012. The tehsil falls within the PS-47 provincial assembly constituency.

According to the 2023 national census, Hussain Bux Mari Tehsil had a population of 172,143. The majority of residents speak Sindhi.

== Demographics ==
The 2023 census recorded a population of 172,143 in Hussain Bux Mari Tehsil. The literacy rate stands at 33.3%.

=== Religion ===
Religions in Hussain Bux Mari Tehsil (2023)
Religion	Percent
Islam	55.17%
Hinduism	44.26%
Other or not stated	0.57%

Islam is the religion of the majority of the tehsil's population. Hinduism is practised by a substantial minority, reflecting the broader religious diversity characteristic of Tharparkar and eastern Sindh.

=== Language ===
Sindhi is the mother tongue of the large majority of residents, spoken by approximately 87.5% of the population. Other languages represented include Balochi and Punjabi.

== See also ==
- Mirpurkhas District
- Shujabad Tehsil, Sindh
