= Bhurgari =

Baloch tribe of Pakistan

Regions with significant populations
- Major: Sindh, Punjab and Balochistan

Languages
- Lassi, Sindhi, Siraiki, Balochi

Religion
- Muslim

Related ethnic groups
- Baloch

Bhurgari (Balochi: ڀرڳڙي) is a Baloch tribe which lives in various provinces of Pakistan.

== Background ==
The tribe is ethnically Baloch, having come into Sindh in the 18th century from the Sulaiman Range. From the time of the Talpur dynasty, members of the tribe have held significant roles in governance, and later fought against the British at the 1843 Battles of Miana and Dubbo.

=== Important settlements ===
- Ghulam Nabi Bhurgri, Shadadkot, Sindh. A historic settlement of the tribe. The settlement is on the common border of Balochistan and Sindh provinces.

== People ==
- Ghulam Muhammad Khan Bhurgri
- Abdul Ghafoor Bhurgri
- Abdul-Majid Bhurgri

== See also ==
- Bhurgari railway station
- Abdul Majid Bhurgri Institute of Language Engineering
- Kot Ghulam Muhammad
