= Sindhri (town) =

Coordinates: 25°43′N 69°08′E

Urdu: سِندھڑى Sindhi: سنڌڙي
- Town
- Sindhri
- Interactive map of Urdu: سِندھڑى
- Country: Pakistan
- Province: Sindh

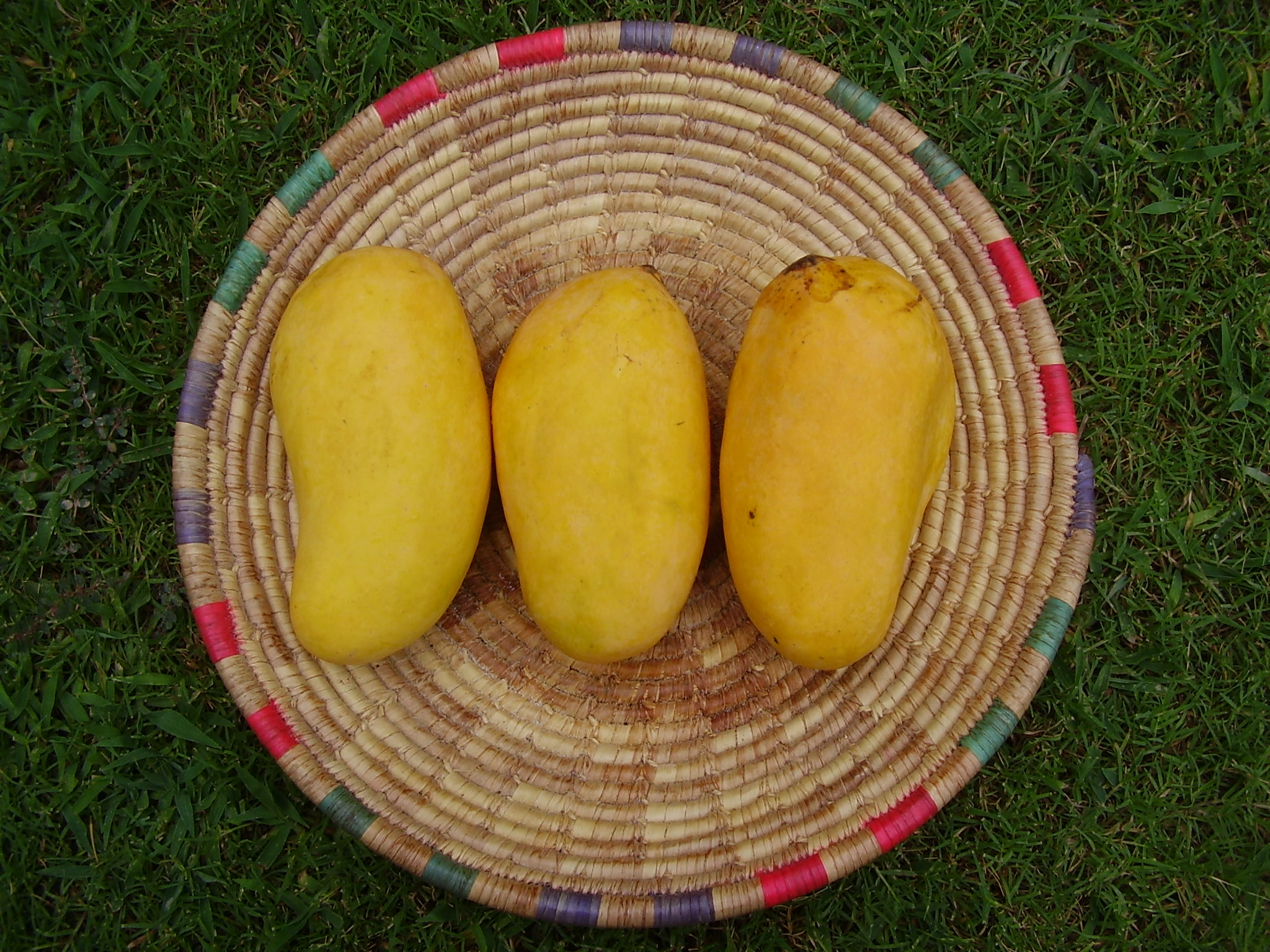
Sindhri Mangoes

Sindhri (Sindhi: سِنڌِڙي, Urdu: سِندھڑى) is the biggest area and a town located in the Mirpur Khas District of the Sindh province of Pakistan. Previously, it was part of Tharparkar District in Sindh. Muhammad Khan Junejo, former prime minister of Pakistan, was born in this town.

Sindhri is also a type of mango grown in Sindh.

== See also ==
- Chaunsa
- Sindhri Airport
- Sant Nenuram Ashram
- Hingorno
