= Hingorno =

- Town
- Interactive map of Hingorno
- Coordinates: 25°44′04″N 69°10′34″E
- Country: Pakistan
- Province: Sindh
- District: Mirpur Khas

Population (2023)
  - Total: 20,569

Hingorno is a small town and Town Committee, situated in Sindhri Tehsil, Mirpur Khas District in Sindh, Pakistan. The Chairperson of Town Community Hingorno Rukhsan Shar and Vice Chairmen Mohammad Ismail Shekh.

4 B School facilities in Hingorno are:

- (1) Govt Higher Secondary School Hingorno for Boys (Under the guidance and supervision of Head Master Farooq Brohi)
- (2) Govt Primary School Noor Mohammad Shar (Under the guidance and supervision of Head Master Abdul Razzaque Soomro)
- (3) Govt Primary School Hingorno (Under the guidance and supervision of Head Master Raza Muhammad Halepoto)
- (4) Government Campus Middle School Hingorno (Under the guidance and supervision of Head Master Madam Riffat Halepoto)
- (5) In addition to that there is a Private school under the name of The Hawks Public School Hingorno Under the guidance and supervision of Ayaz Ali Kumbhar

1) In addition to that there is a Private Academy under the name of Self Excellence Academy Hingorno Under the guidance and supervision of Ayaz Ali Kumbhar (Academic Time 02:00 pm to 06:30 pm)

2) In addition to that there is a Private Academy under the name of Sun-Shine Academy Hingorno Under the guidance and supervision of Raj Kumar Dhandev (Academic Time 02:00 pm to 06:30 pm)

2 Nadra e Sahult

2 Bigest Nadra in Hingorno 1.Nadra E Sahulat Registration Sindhri, 2.Al.Rizwan Computers and Nadra e Sahulat Hingorno(pvt) PROP:+ Ab Qadir, Salman Qadir, Munsif Ali

In the Hospital facility at Hingorno there is a Government Civil Hospital(in collaboration with PPHI).

Both Muslim and Hindu communities have been living in the town for centuries.

== Occupations ==
A large portion of the population depends on agriculture. The main crops are cotton, wheat, mustard, onions, sugarcane, vegetables and fruit. Ten percent of the population holds other occupations, including private and government jobs.

== Facilities ==
A government hospital is available for first aid services. Several mosques, including the historical Motia Masjid, are available for the Muslim communities.

== See also ==
- List of tehsils of Sindh
