= PS-47 Mirpur Khas-III =

Constituency of the Provincial Assembly of Sindh, Pakistan

- Constituency for the Provincial Assembly of Sindh
- Region: Kot Ghulam Muhammad Tehsil, Shujabad Tehsil (partly) and Digri Tehsil (partly) of Mirpur Khas District
- Electorate: 224,473

Current constituency
- Member: Vacant
- Created from: PS-67 Mirpurkhas-IV (2002-2018); PS-49 Mirpur Khas-III (2018-2023)

PS-47 Mirpur Khas-III (پی ایس-47، مِيرپورخاص-3) is a constituency of the Provincial Assembly of Sindh.

== General elections 2024 ==
Provincial election 2024: PS-47 Mirpur Khas-III
Party	Candidate	Votes	%	±%
PPP	Noor Ahmed Bhurgri	56,812	58.13	
Independent	Faisal Kachelo	17,441	17.84	
GDA	Mir Janullah Khan Talpur	12,747	13.04	
Independent	Ali Nawaz Shah	5,026	5.14	
PTI	Ali Raza (Note: Filed nomination papers as PTI candidate but ECP allowed him to run as an independent)	2,436	2.49	
Others	Others (fourteen candidates)	3,278	3.36	
Turnout		103,389	46.06	
Total valid votes		97,740	94.54	
Rejected ballots		5,649	5.46	
Majority		39,371	40.29	
Registered electors		224,473		
PPP hold				

== General elections 2018 ==
Provincial election 2018: PS-49 Mirpurkhas-III
Party	Candidate	Votes	%	±%
PPP	Noor Ahmed Bhurgri	53,006	57.99	
Independent	Shuja Muhammad Shah	32,095	35.12	
Independent	Nemoon	2,053	2.25	
Independent	Mumtaz Ali	1,401	1.53	
Independent	Bhoori Lal	1,211	1.33	
Independent	Sadat Ahmed Bhurgri	405	0.44	
Independent	Irfan Ahmed Bhurgri	361	0.40	
PSP	Mir Zaman	287	0.31	
MQM-P	Muhammad Tarique	193	0.21	
Independent	Ameer Hyder	167	0.18	
Independent	Chaman Das	96	0.11	
Independent	Musaddique Bhurgri	83	0.09	
Independent	Sardar Ghulam Mustafa Khaskheli	41	0.04	
Majority		20,911	22.87	
Valid ballots		91,399		
Rejected ballots		4,218		
Turnout		95,617		
Registered electors		178,048		
hold				

== General elections 2013 ==
Contesting candidates	Party affiliation	Votes polled

== General elections 2008 ==
Contesting candidates	Party affiliation	Votes polled

== See also ==
- PS-46 Mirpur Khas-II
- PS-48 Mirpur Khas-IV
