= Aftab Hussain Shah Jillani =

Pakistani politician

Member of the National Assembly of Pakistan
- Incumbent
- Assumed office 29 February 2024
- Constituency: NA-211 Mirpur Khas-I
- In office 2002–2013
- Constituency: NA-226 (Mirpurkhas-cum-Umerkot-I)

Personal details
- Party: PPP (2002-present)
- Relations: Pir Shafqat Hussain Shah Jilani (brother)

Pir Aftab Hussain Shah Jilani is a Pakistani politician who has been a member of the National Assembly of Pakistan since February 2024 and previously served in this position from 2002 to 2013.

== Political career ==
He was elected to the National Assembly of Pakistan from Constituency NA-226 (Mirpurkhas-I) as a candidate of Pakistan Peoples Party (PPP) in the 2002 Pakistani general election. He received 63,638 votes and defeated Rais Ahmed Khan, a candidate of Muttahida Qaumi Movement (MQM).

He was re-elected to the National Assembly from Constituency NA-226 (Mirpurkhas-cum-Umerkot-I) as a candidate of PPP in the 2008 Pakistani general election. He received 78,543 votes and defeated Khursheed Ahmed Siddiqui, a candidate of MQM.

He was re-elected to the National Assembly as a candidate of PPP from NA-211 Mirpur Khas-I in the 2024 Pakistani general election. He received 84,512 votes and defeated Syed Ali Nawaz Shah Rizvi, an independent candidate.
