= Ghulam Muhammad Khan Bhurgri =

Pakistani politician

- غلام محمد خان ڀرڳڙي
- Born: Ghulam Muhammad; 15 July 1878; Dengan Bhurgri, Taluka Kot Ghulam Muhammad Bhurgri, District Mirpurkhas, Sindh, British Raj
- Died: 12 March 1924 (aged 45)
- Other names: Sardar Bhurgri, Raees, GM Bhurgri
- Education: Sindh Madressatul Islam; Muslim High School Aligarh Lincoln's Inn
- Occupations: Politician, freedom fighter

Ghulam Muhammad Khan Bhurgri (Sindhi: غلام محمد خان ڀرڳڙي) (Barrister, 1878-1924) was a Sindhi statesman.

Raees Ghulam Mohammad Bhurgri was one of the earliest leaders of Sindh during the colonial period. He was contemporary and one of the closest aide of Quaid-e-Azam Mohammad Ali Jinnah.

Alike Jinnah, Bhurgri was also associated with both the Indian National Congress and All India Muslim League. The role of both these leaders was to bridge the differences between two major political parties of India as well as the religious communities.

== Early life ==
Raees Ghulam Muhammad Bhurgri was born on 15 July 1878 in the village of Dengan Bhurgri, Kot Ghulam Muhammad, District Tharparkar (now Mirpurkhas) in Sindh. He was the second son of Wali Muhammad Khan Bhurgri, a well-known, prosperous landlord (zamindar) of Sindh. Bhurgris family had migrated from "Bhurgarh" place in Dera Ghazi Khan to present MirpurKhas district of Sindh.

== Education ==
According to family traditions the services of a religious teacher were hired for teaching Persian and reading of Quran to Ghulam Mohammad during his early age. However, education in those days at the hands of religious teachers always used to be associated with severe beatings. Ghulam Mohammad went through such ordeal when he was tied with trunk of a tree by his teacher and flogged mercilessly, which resulted in a life-long scar on his forehead.

He received his elementary education at home. Later, he joined Mission School, Hyderabad (Sindh) N.H. Academy, Hyderabad, and Sindh Madrassah-tul-Is!am, Karachi.

In 1890 he went to Aligarh and passed his matriculation examination from Muslim High School Aligarh.

Initially started looking after his agricultural property when another incident forced him to go to England to study law, for three years from 1905 to 1908 and was called the bar from Lincoln's Inn.

== Family ==
His son Raees Ghulam Mustafa Khan Bhurgri, who was a member of the Sindh Assembly, was the greatest opponent of One Unit and voted against the bill during the Sindh assembly session in 1957 at Hyderabad, on 17 September 1957, a resolution was moved against unification of West Pakistan was by Ghulam Mustafa Bhurgri.

== Professional career ==
After his return, he started a practice in Hyderabad (Sindh).

== Political career ==
He was the first Sindhi Muslim barrister, who rose to the highest status of politician in the subcontinent as a Sindhi.

Ghulam Mohammad Bhurgri was among the foremost Muslim leaders of Sindh whose activities had a significant impact on mainstream Indian politics. He was active at one time or another in several major political organisations.

He was the first to clamor for compulsory free education and in this connection moved the 'Muslim Education Cess Bill' (to recover just one 'pie' per rupee for this purpose) in the then Bombay Legislative Assembly. This move was strenuously opposed and defeated by the Zamindars and other vested interests who feared the possible dangers of spreading education, especially amongst the Haris and landless -labourers.

His relentless efforts brought in more grants to the local boards, besides more facilities to the cultivators and drastic improvements in the conditions of irrigation canals and roads. He also clamored for many other welfare causes and liberally helped the needy, especially poor litigants and students.

He was elected as a member of the Bombay Legislative Council in 1909; he was re-elected in 1913 and again in 1916. He was a member of the Indian National Congress in 1917.

In February 1920 he became President of the All India Khilafat Conference (1919–29).

On 10 July 1919, G M Bhurgri accompanied the Jinnah leader of deputation for Khilafat to London.

In an interview eminent politician and Jurist Rasul Bux Palejo Said: "If Bhurgri had been alive at the time of independence, Quaid-E- Azam Would have made him the first Prime Minister instead of Liaquat Ali Khan". He was among the most trusted and close political allies of Mr. Jinnah he further said. Raees Ghulam Mohammad was among those very few leaders who openly opposed the British rule right from the word go, He was progressive Landlord;

=== Muslim League ===
He remained a dedicated member of the All India Muslim League all through his life and attended all its annual sessions. He was a member of the Reforms Committee (8th session, Bombay, December 1915-January 1916), a member of the Committee to Discuss Congress-League Scheme (10th session - Calcutta, December 1917- January 1918) and a member of the Committee of Moplah Trouble (14th session, Ahmedabad, December 1921).

He was elected President of the All India Muslim League (15th session) at Lucknow 31 March - 1 April 1923. In his presidential address, Bhurgri touched upon, among other things, the Turkish and Khilafat question and the possibility of a league of Oriental Nations. Bhurgri was a Muslim League delegate, under the leadership of Quaid-e-Azam, to give evidence before the Selbourne Committee of British Parliament on India Bill.

== Role for Sindh ==
He championed the cause of separation of Sindh from Bombay Presidency with a view to safeguarding the interests of Sindhi Muslims. He with his friends came to the conclusion that the issue must be brought to all India political forums. All India National Congress had been made aware of the issue since 1913, and now All India Muslim League must also be asked to play its part. In December 1925, in its seventeenth session, the Muslim League passed the resolution that Sindh should be separated from Bombay and constituted into a separate province.

Bhurgri continuously lobbied for a separate province, proposing resolutions at all-India moots, from 1925 onwards. He repeatedly urged the Aga Khan who led the Muslim delegation to the Round Table Conferences (1930–32) and Jinnah to get the Sindh separation issue settled favourably during the London confabulations.

Sindh Provincial Political Conference (1920-30s)

In the Reforms of 1909, Sindh had been given four seats in Bombay Legislative Council. Ghulam Mohammad was one of the four elected members from Sindh. He attended the first session of the Council on 4 January 1910 at Bombay and continued representing his province for ten years till 1920. His utmost concern was the state of education, health, infrastructure, roads, irrigation and most importantly the highhandedness of colonial masters and bureaucracy.

He also presented Muslim Education Cess Bill in the assembly. According to this Bill, landlords were to contribute one percent of their income for education. But the Bill was rejected.

Azad Sindh Conference (1930)

He started the Sindhi weekly Al-Amin from Hyderabad which was edited by Shaikh Abdul Majeed Sindhi.

Bhurgri was an accomplished lawyer and defended Sheikh Abdul Majeed Sindhi against Government prosecution under press laws.

As President of Muhammedan Educational Conference, Poona, he tried to expand educational facilities in rural areas.

Our Perspective Changes about Feudal lords, when We talk of Raees Bhurgri, His Contributions for Sindh were exceptional, wrote by G. M. Syed in his book.

== Death ==
He died on 10 March 1924 and was buried in his ancestral graveyard.

In recognition of his services, the Sindh Government changed the name of the town and Taluka of Jamesabad to Kot Ghulam Muhammad Bhurgri.

His photo was featured on commemorative postage stamps of Pakistan on 14 August 1993.

== Books on Bhurgri ==
- Barrister Raees Ghulam Muhammad Khan Bhurgri Life and Works by former bureaucrat Mohammad Hashim Leghari

== See also ==
- Bhurgri
- List of Sindhi people
