= Jhuddo Tehsil =

Jhuddo Tehsil تحصیل جھڈو
- Tehsil
- Jhudo Tehsil
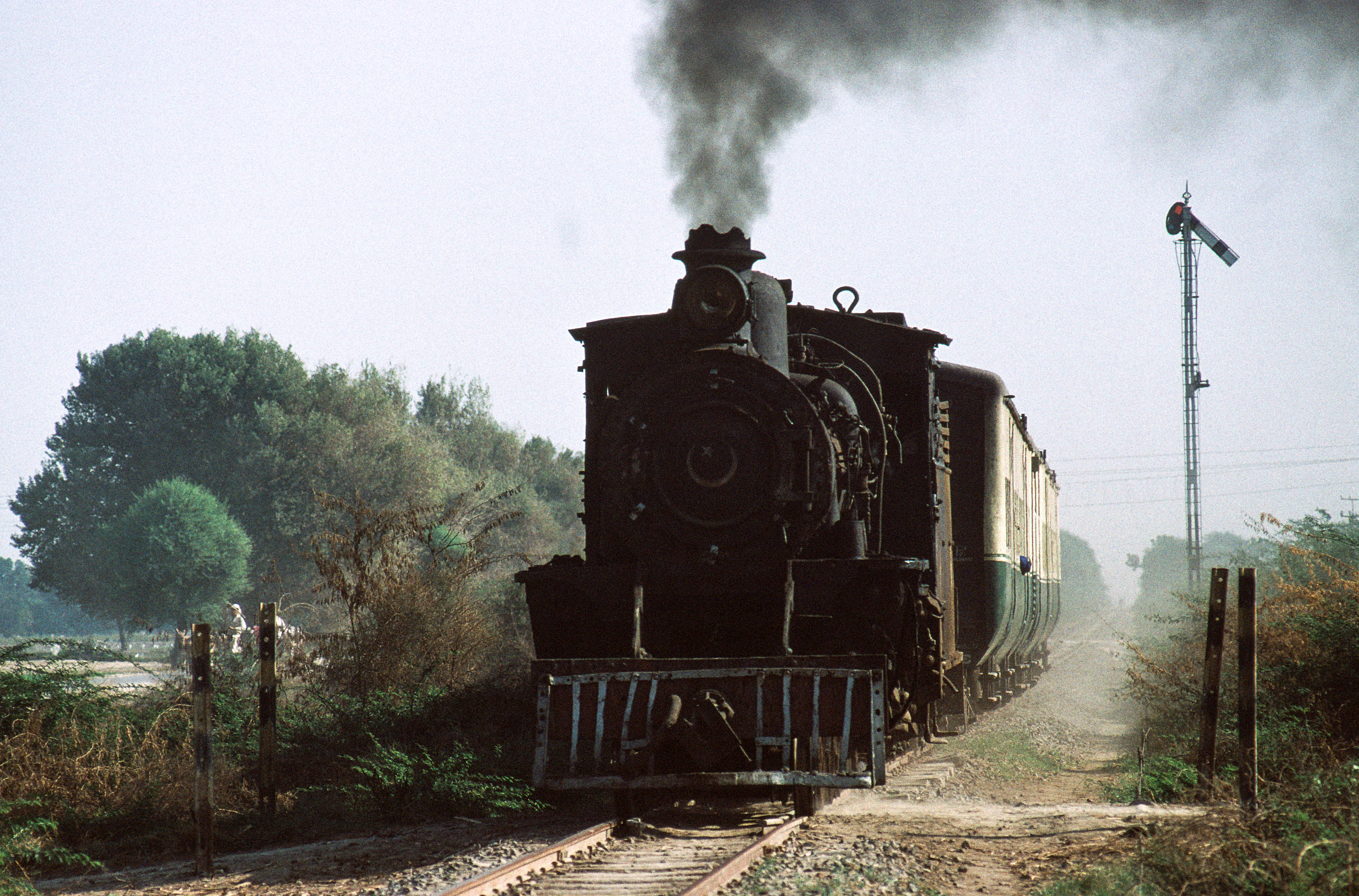
- Train built by Kerr Stuart in 1921, near Jhudo city
- Country: Pakistan
- Region: Sindh
- District: Mirpurkhas
- Capital: Jhuddo

Population (2023)
  - Tehsil: 230,285
  - Urban: 67,675
  - Rural: 162,610
- Time zone: UTC+5 (PKT)

Jhuddo, also called Jhudo, is a tehsil located in Mirpurkhas District, Sindh, Pakistan. The population is 230,285 according to the 2023 census.

== Demographics ==
=== Population ===
According to 2023 Pakistani census Jhudo taluka had population of 230,285 up from 201,850 in 2017.

=== Language ===
Kot Ghulam Muhammad Taluka (2023)
1. Sindhi (81.3%)
2. Punjabi (5.62%)
3. Urdu (4.21%)
4. Balochi (0.78%)
5. Hindko (1.86%)
6. Saraiki (0.32%)
7. Mewati (1.44%)
8. Others (4.40%)

Sindhi (83.8%) is spoken by the majority of the population followed by Urdu (7.9%) and Punjabi (5.1%).

=== Religion ===
Religions in Jhudo Taluka (2023)
Religion	Percent
Islam	55.02%
Hinduism	44.58%
Other or not stated	0.40%

Islam is followed by the majority of the tehsil's population. Hindus forms a significant minority.

== See also ==
- Kot Ghulam Muhammad Tehsil
