= Bhurgari railway station =

Village in Sindh, Pakistan

Bhurgri Station ڀرڳڙي ريلوي اسٽيشن

General information
- Coordinates: 27.9558°N 67.9496°E
- Owner: Ministry of Railways
- Line: Larkana–Jacobabad Light Railway

Other information
- Station code: BHGR
Location

Bhurgari Railway Station (Urdu: بھرگڑی, Sindhi: ڀرڳڙي ريلوي اسٽيشن) is located in Village Ghulam Nabi Bhurgri, Taluka Shahdadkot, District Qamber Shahdadkot District, Sind, Pakistan.

== History ==
The North-Western Railway ran through the district from north to south. Alight railway was constructed from Larkana to Kamber and thence to Shahdadkot and Jacobabad in Upper Sindh in 1918 during First World War. The names of the Railway Stations are as follows; 1) Larkana 2)Biro Chandio3) Pir Muhammad Metlo 4)Kamber 5)Bahram (Hethyon) 6)Ghulam Muhammad Kariro near Golo Wah 7)Silra Shahdadkot 8)Bhurgri Station 9)Umed Ali Junejo. After this came the Railway Station of Garhi Khero in District Jacobabad.

== See also ==
- List of railway stations in Pakistan
- Pakistan Railways
