= Bhittaipedia =

- Screenshot
- Website type: Online encyclopedia
- Country of origin: Pakistan
- Owner: Abdul Majid Bhurgri Institute of Language Engineering
- Website: bhittaipedia.org
- Commercial: No
- Current status: Active

Bhittaipedia (Sindhi: ڀٽائيپيڊيا) is a project on Shah Jo Risalo, where all compilations, translations, books, research articles on the works of Shah Abdul Latif Bhittai are published. The project is developed by Abdul Majid Bhurgri Institute of Language Engineering, Hyderabad, Sindh Pakistan.

== Development ==
Idea development was by computational linguist Amar Fayaz Buriro, who presented the concept of Bhittaipedia, where all translations of Shah Jo Risalo made by different authors and research papers including books may be publish on one Website as like Encyclopedia. Scientific data of animals, birds, places and human characters which were sung by Shah Abdul Latif Bhittai in his poetry will be provided in the research portal. Then Abdul Majid Bhurgri Institute of Language Engineering started work on this project.

== Languages ==
Sindhi is a primary language of Bhittaipedia, while English, Arabic, Persian, Urdu and Punjabi translations are available on the web application. The transliteration in Devanagari and Latin typography of each verse has been also published. Using Artificial Intelligence (AI) technology, Bhittaipedia provides web portal users with machine translations in 130 different languages.

== Risalo's Translations ==
Some of the translations of the Risalo available via Bhittaipedia are listed below with links.

Translator	Language	Link
Amar Fayaz Buriro	English	https://bhittaipedia.org/english-risalo/amar-fayaz-buriro
Elsa Kazi	English	https://bhittaipedia.org/translated-by/elsa-kazi/en
Muhammad Yakoob Agha	English	https://bhittaipedia.org/translated-by/muhammad-yakoob-agha/en
Amena Khamisani	English	https://bhittaipedia.org/translated-by/amena-khamisani/en
Faiz Muhammad Khoso	English	https://bhittaipedia.org/translated-by/faiz-muhammad-khoso/en
Agha Saleem	English	https://bhittaipedia.org/translated-by/agha-saleem/en
Fazal Rahim Soomro	Arabic	https://bhittaipedia.org/translated-by/soomro-fazal/ar
Faiz Muhammad Khoso	Arabic	https://bhittaipedia.org/translated-by/faiz-muhammad-khoso/ar
Niaz Hamayuni	Farsi	https://bhittaipedia.org/translated-by/hamayuni-niaz/pr
Kartar Singh Arsh	Punjabi	https://bhittaipedia.org/translated-by/kartar-singh-arsh/pa
Shakeel Ahmed Tahiri	Punjabi	https://bhittaipedia.org/translated-by/shakeel-ahmed-tahiri/pa
Sheikh Ayaz	Urdu	https://bhittaipedia.org/translated-by/sheikh-ayaz/ur
Agha Saleem	Urdu	https://bhittaipedia.org/translated-by/agha-saleem/ur

== Sindhi Editions of Risalo ==
A list of Sindhi editions of the Risalo, available via Bhittaipedia, their editors and links are listed in the following table.

Editor's Name (Sindhi)	Editor's Name (English)	Link
ڊاڪٽر ارنيسٽ ٽرمپ	Dr. Ernest Trumpp	https://bhittaipedia.org/risalo-by/dr.-ernest-trumpp
تاراچند شوقيرام آڏواڻي	Tara Chand Shokeeram Aadwani	https://bhittaipedia.org/risalo-by/tara-chand-shokeeram
مرزا قليچ بيگ	Mirza Qaleech Baig	https://bhittaipedia.org/risalo-by/mirza-qaleech-baig
ھوتچند مولچند گربخشاڻي	Hotchand Molchand Gurbakhshani	https://bhittaipedia.org/risalo-by/gurbakhshani
غلام محمد شاھواڻي	Ghulam Muhammad Shahwani	https://bhittaipedia.org/risalo-by/gm-shahwani
محمد عثمان ڏيپلائي	Usman Diplai	https://bhittaipedia.org/risalo-by/usman-diplai
ڪلياڻ بولچند آڏواڻي	Kaliyan Bolchand Aadwani	https://bhittaipedia.org/risalo-by/adwani-kaliyan
علامہ آءِ. آءِ. قاضي	Allama I. I. Qazi	https://bhittaipedia.org/risalo-by/allama-i.-i.-qazi
ڊاڪٽر بلوچ (برٽش ميوزيم)	Dr. Baloch (British Museum)	https://bhittaipedia.org/risalo-by/dr-baloch-(british-museum)
ڊاڪٽر بلوچ (1269-1270 ھ)	Dr. Baloch (1269-1270 Hijri)	https://bhittaipedia.org/risalo-by/dr-baloch-(1269-hijri-and-1270-hijri)
ڊاڪٽر بلوچ (1165-1207 ھ)	Dr. Baloch (1165-1207 Hijri)	https://bhittaipedia.org/risalo-by/dr-baloch-(1165_1207-hijri)
عثمان علي انصاري	Usman Ali Ansari	https://bhittaipedia.org/risalo-by/usman-ali-ansari
ٻانهون خان شيخ	Banhoo Khan Shaikh	https://bhittaipedia.org/risalo-by/banhoo-khan-shaikh
ڊاڪٽر نبي بخش بلوچ	Dr. Nabi Bakhsh Baloch	https://bhittaipedia.org/risalo-by/dr.-nabi-bakhsh-baloch

== Bhittaipedia Edition of Risalo ==
The Bhittaipedia team have consolidated all the poems and vaayis of Shah Abdul Latif Bhittai into a single electronic edition. This comprehensive resource is accessible through the following links.

- In Arabic script: https://bhittaipedia.org/risalo/arabic-perso
- In Devnagri script: https://bhittaipedia.org/risalo/devnagri
- In Roman Sindhi script: https://bhittaipedia.org/risalo/roman

Here are the Surs and their poem (bayt and vaayi) count in the Bhittaipedia edition of Risalo:

Sur Count	Sur Name in Sindhi	Total Poems (Bayts) in a Sur	Total Vayyis in a Sur
1	ڪلياڻ	84	7
2	يمن ڪلياڻ	254	12
3	کنڀات	110	8
4	سريراڳ	137	10
5	سامونڊي	116	11
6	سھڻي	283	21
7	سارنگ	85	6
8	ڪيڏارو	89	7
9	آبڙي	173	21
10	معذوري	192	13
11	ديسي	299	20
12	ڪوھياري	95	8
13	حسيني	349	30
14	سورٺ	97	6
15	بروو سنڌي	84	4
16	راڻو	224	10
17	کاھوڙي	65	5
18	رامڪلي	348	21
19	پورب	75	12
20	بلاول	87	5
21	ليلا	119	4
22	ڏھر	160	5
23	جاجڪاڻي	52	4
24	ڪاپائتي	43	1
25	رِپ	45	3
26	آسا	181	10
27	گهاتو	27	2
28	ڪيڏارو	25	1
29	مارئي	443	26
30	ڪاموڏ	43	3
31	ڪارايل	86	3
TOTAL		4470	299

In summary, the whole Risalo has 299 Vayyis and 4,470 Bayts. That is: 4,769 poems in total.

== See also ==
- Shah Jo Risalo
- Shah Abdul Latif Bhittai
- Abdul Majid Bhurgri Institute of Language Engineering
