= Abdul Ghafoor Bhurgri =

Pakistani lawyer, writer and politician

Abdul Ghafoor Bhurgri عبدا لغفورڀرڳڙي عبدل غفور بھرگڑی
- Born: Abdul Ghafoor Bhurgri; 1 January 1921; Village Ghulam Nabi Bhurgri, Taluka Shahdadkot, District Qamber Shahdadkot, Sindh, British India
- Died: 10 February 2015 (aged 94)
- Other name: Bhurgri
- Education: Aligarh Muslim University, Bombay University
- Occupations: Lawyer, Writer.
- Years active: 1941-2015
- Website: www.bhurgri.com

Abdul Ghafoor Bhurgri (Sindhi: عبدا لغفورڀرڳڙي) (1 January 1921 – 10 February 2015) was a lawyer, writer and politician from Larkana, Pakistan.

== Early life ==
Abdul Ghafoor Bhurgri was born on 1 January 1921, in the village of Ghulam Nabi Bhurgri, Shahdadkot. His father, Abdul Jalil Bhurgri, was a government employee and also practiced agriculture.

== Education ==
Bhurgri received primary education in Shahdadkot and matriculated from Madrassah High School, Larkana. After graduating from C & S College, Shikarpur, affiliated with Bombay University, he attended the Aligarh Muslim University. He gained his LLB and Masters in the Persian language between 1942 and 1946.

== Professional life ==
His students included former Chief Justice of Pakistan Rana Bhagwandas. "Had I not followed the advice of my senior Mr Bhurgri, I would not have reached the top in the judiciary,” said Rana Bhagwandas. Other students included former Law Secretary Parkash Lal, Abdul Ghafoor's own son Justice Abdul Hamid Bhurgri (a judge at High Court of Sindh), and Muhammad Bachal Tunio (Additional Advocate General High Court Larkano)

== Journalism ==
He sometimes wrote for the newspaper Insaf.

== Political career ==
In his student life, he joined the Muslim League, as a true soldier of Quaid-e-Azam Mohammad Ali Jinnah. He started his political career at C & S College Shikarpur then Bombay University, by forming of Muslim Student Federation and then became its president. He was amongst the freedom fighters from his early life.

He started his political career from Muslim League and had political affiliation with Muslim League leader and former Chief Minister Sindh Qazi Fazlullah Ubaidullah. Bhurgri also developed association with former Chief Minister Muhammad Ayub Khuhro in Khuhro's last days.

He not only took part in politics from the platform of the Muslim League, but also devoted his time to literary activities under the banner of Jamaat Shoara-i-Sindh and played a key role in organizing literary conferences in Larkana.

In 1953, at the age of 32, he became the first elected president of the Larkana Municipal Committee.The foundation of Pakistan National Centre, Town Hall Larkana was laid by H.E. Ghulam Muhammad then Governor General Pakistan, Mr. Abdul Ghafoor Bhurgri, the president of Larkana Municipal Committee on 9th day of January 1954.

[1][14]

In 1976 he joined the Pakistan Peoples Party, soon after joining the party he was appointed as Deputy General Secretary Sindh. In 1977 he was elected unopposed from PS-31 (Shahdadkot Taluka).

Bhurgri was imprisoned five times during 1978 and 1987.

He represented Pakistan in the United Nations in 1983 and 1995.

In 1984 he became minister for revenue and culture for Sindh.

== Literary contribution ==
- Zindagi Jo Safar ( زندگئ جو سفر) is a Sindhi language book on Sufism through poetry of Shah Abdul Latif Bhitai, Rumi and Muhammad Iqbal.

Published by Shah Abdul Latif Bhitai Chair, University of Karachi,

- Saath Dhanri Sarwaarn (ساٿ ڌ ڻئ سرواڻ) is a Sindhi language book on the life of Quaid-e-Azam Muhammad Ali Jinnah.
- Zulfikar Ali Bhutto: The Falcon of Pakistan, book published by SZABIST, fore-worded by Former Prime Minister Mohtarma Benazir Bhutto, the book describes the life of Zulfiqar Ali Bhutto
- Guzri Jay Waya, Say Zamana Yaad Paya, (گزئ جئ وئا، سئ زمانا ياد پيا) is the Sindhi language autobiography of Abdul Ghafoor Bhurgri.

== Death ==
He died on 10 February 2015 at his home in Larkana, aged 94. The funeral prayers were led by Sayyid Ghulam Hussain Shah Bukhari of Dargah Hussainabad (Kamber). In tribute, work at the high court and lower courts of Larkana temporarily ceased.

== See also ==
- Bhurgri
- Larkana
- List of Sindhi people
- Abdul-Majid Bhurgri
