= Abdul-Majid Bhurgri =

Pakistani computer Software Professional (born 1948)

Abdul Majid Bhurgri عبدالماجد ڀرڳڙي
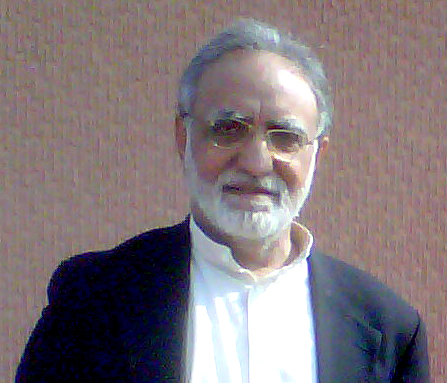
- Born: Abdul-Majid Bhurgri; February 8, 1948 (age 78); Ghulam Nabi Bhurgri, Qamber Shahdadkot, Sindh, Pakistan
- Other name: M.B Sindhi
- Education: University of Arizona; University of Sindh
- Occupation: Computer software professional
- Years active: 1972–present
- Website: www.bhurgri.com

Abdul-Majid Bhurgri (Sindhi: عبدالماجد ڀرڳڙي; born February 8, 1948) is a Pakistani-American technology entrepreneur. He is the founder of computing in the Sindhi language. Bhurgri is from Larkana, Sindh, Pakistan, and now lives in Seattle, USA. His work from 1987 to 1988 enabled the use of Sindhi on personal computers and revolutionized the Sindhi printing and publishing industry and largely with his work the later upcoming Sindhi generation helped further digitize it.

From 2000 to 2001, Bhurgri developed the first Sindhi Unicode font, obtained support for Sindhi on the Microsoft Windows platform, developed resources to make the use of standard Sindhi possible on the Windows operating system, and made these resources freely available on the Internet.

In 2002, Bhurgri wrote a paper for Microsoft titled “Enabling Pakistani Languages Through Unicode”. Referring to Bhurgri's paper, Microsoft's Michael S. Kaplan wrote on his blog: “This is pretty exciting, since at one point Sindhi was being considered for Vista (but was ultimately not done). I suspect that Abdul-Majid Bhurgri (who I was in contact with back in 2007 talking about Urdu and Sindhi) will be pleased to see Sindhi finally being added to Windows 8.”

== Early life ==
Bhurgri was born in the village of Ghulam Nabi Bhurgri, part of the Taluka Shahdadkot (now Qamber Shahdadkot) district of Larkana, in Pakistan's Sindh Province. His father, Abdul Ghafoor Bhurgri, was a lawyer, politician, and writer. His mother, Khursheed Bano, was a housewife.

== Education ==
Bhurgri completed his primary education in Larkana, first at PV School and later at Shah Muhammad School. He began his secondary education at Municipal High School and completed it at Government High School in Larkana.

He went on to the University of Sindh, where he received a B.A., with honors, in general history. He then decided to prepare for the Central Superior Services of Pakistan examinations and sought admission to the Bachelor of Laws (LL.B.) programme at Law College in Larkana.

In 1983, he enrolled in the MBA programme at the University of Arizona in Tucson. He graduated in 1985 with an emphasis in finance. It was during his studies at the University of Arizona that he was introduced to computer technology.

== Professional life ==
In October 1971, Bhurgri took the Central Superior Services of Pakistan exam. He passed and was selected to work for the Pakistan Taxation Service, which he joined on 13 November 1972. He received a year of professional training at the Financial Services Academy in Walton, near Lahore. After that, he received further departmental training for six months.

In July 1974, he was posted to Larkana as an income tax officer. He stayed there for three years. In 1977, he was transferred to Hyderabad, and then to Karachi in 1980.

He went on leave from 1980 to 1983, and while on leave, he was promoted to additional commissioner of income tax. On his return, he was posted to Karachi. In 1990, he became general manager for commercial purchases at Pakistan International Airlines. After about six months, he went on leave without pay and went to America. There, he was offered a job as a consultant and adviser to a Silicon Valley firm, Advanced Micro Research, which he accepted.

== Sindhi computing ==
In 1987, Bhurgri decided to set up a desktop publishing business in collaboration with a friend. For this purpose, he bought a Macintosh personal computer and a laser printer. While he was waiting for the equipment to be delivered, his collaborator, who was supposed to set up the facility, said he could not do so because of personal exigencies. When the equipment was finally delivered around October 1987, Bhurgri was stuck with it. It was then that he decided to work on a solution for the use of Sindhi on personal computers, specifically for the purposes of word processing and desktop publishing.

In November 1987, after experimenting for a few weeks, Bhurgri successfully printed a page in Sindhi on the laser printer. The Sindhi daily Hilal-e-Pakistan reported the news. Soon, the newspaper published a column written by Inam Shaikh and typeset on Bhurgri's Macintosh computer. Bhurgri also typeset the Sindhi section of Nuqoosh, a college magazine in Karachi. This was the beginning of Sindhi computing, which revolutionized the Sindhi printing and publishing industry over the next few years, allowing it to move from outdated manual typesetting into the new era of computer-based typesetting.

By March 1988, Bhurgri had come up with a more stable version of Sindhi desktop computing. In July 1988, Pakistani distributors for Apple officially announced Sindhi desktop computing at a ceremony in Karachi, and acknowledged Bhurgri's contribution.

The daily Hilal Pakistan was the first Sindhi newspaper to use this system. The daily Awami Awaz began publishing with four computers and a laser printer. Ibrat, Kawish, Aftab, and other newspapers and magazines followed suit.

In 2000–01, Bhurgri coordinated with Microsoft and came up with a Unicode solution for the Sindhi language. The Unicode standard enabled the use of Sindhi on the Internet and thereby ushered in an era of communication among Sindhi speakers worldwide. Bhurgri also uploaded his famous Sindhi installer to his website for free distribution.

== Personal life ==
In 1969, while his family was spending a summer vacation in Quetta, Bhurgri met a Kashmiri girl named Nargis. In 1970, they got married. Nargis died on 25 April 2008.

Bhurgri has three sons—Abdul Musavir, Abdul Basit, and Abdul Bari—and a daughter, Ayesha.

== Awards ==
Bhurgri received the Latif Award from the government of Sindh on 26 November 2015, and the Dr. Feroze Ahmed Memorial Award from the Sindh Association of North America.

== Eponymous entities ==
Abdul Majid Bhurgri Institute of Language Engineering was named in his honor and was inaugurated in 2019.

== See also ==
- Bhurgri
- Larkana
- List of Sindhi people
