= Mir Munawar Ali Talpur =

Pakistani politician

Member of the National Assembly of Pakistan
- Incumbent
- Assumed office 29 February 2024
- Constituency: NA-212 Mirpur Khas-II
- In office 13 August 2018 – 10 August 2023
- Constituency: NA-219 (Mirpur Khas-II)
- In office 2008 – 31 May 2018
- Constituency: NA-227 (Mirpurkhas-cum-Umerkot-II)

Personal details
- Born: 21 March 1956 (age 70)
- Party: PPP (2008-present)
- Spouse: Faryal Talpur (wife)

Mir Munawar Ali Talpur (Urdu: میر منور علی تالپور; born 21 March 1956) is a veteran Pakistani politician hailing from Mirpurkhas, Sindh, who had been a member of the National Assembly of Pakistan since February 2024 and previously serve in this position from August 2018 till August 2023 and from 2008 to May 2018. He was a member of the Provincial Assembly of Sindh from February 1985 to October 1999. From 1988 to 1990, he served as the Provincial Minister for Irrigation in Sindh.

== Political career ==
Talpur was elected to the National Assembly of Pakistan as a candidate of Pakistan Peoples Party (PPP) since 2008, from Constituency NA-227 (Mirpurkhas-cum-Umerkot-II) in the 2008 Pakistani general election.

He was re-elected to the National Assembly as a candidate of PPP from Constituency NA-227 (Mirpurkhas-cum-Umerkot-II) in the 2013 Pakistani general election.

He was re-elected to the National Assembly as a candidate of PPP from NA-219 (Mirpur Khas-II) in the 2018 Pakistani general election.

He was re-elected to the National Assembly as a candidate of PPP from NA-212 Mirpur Khas-II in the 2024 Pakistani general election. He received 122,291 votes and defeated Syed Ali Nawaz Shah Rizvi, an independent candidate.

He was elected to the Sindh Assembly several times from 1985 onward, from PS-59 in 1985; from PS-52 in 1988; PS-52 in 1990; PS-52 from 1993; and PS-52 from 1997.
