= Noor Ahmed Bhurgri =

Pakistani politician

Member of the Provincial Assembly of Sindh
- In office 13 August 2018 – 11 August 2023
- Constituency: PS-49 Mirpur Khas-III
- In office November 2015 – 28 May 2018

Personal details
- Born: 1 January 1945 (age 81) Mirpur Khas District, Sindh, Pakistan
- Party: PPP (2015-present)

Noor Ahmed Bhurgri is a Pakistani politician who had been a Member of the Provincial Assembly of Sindh, from August 2018 to August 2023 and from November 2015 to May 2018.

== Early life ==
He was born on 1 January 1945 in Mirpur Khas District.

== Political career ==
He was elected to the Provincial Assembly of Sindh as a candidate of Pakistan Peoples Party (PPP) from Constituency PS-67 MIRPUR KHAS-CUM-UMERKOT in by-polls held in November 2015.

He was re-elected to Provincial Assembly of Sindh as a candidate of PPP from Constituency PS-49 (Mirpur Khas-III) in the 2018 Pakistani general election.
