= Rahu Abad =

Rahu Abad Rahoo Abad
- Town
- راھو آباد
- Interactive map of Rahu Abad
- Coordinates: 25.349825°N 69.3893214°E
- Country: Pakistan
- District: Umerkot
- Taluka: Samaro
- Union Council: Saleh Bhambhro Station
- Highest elevation: 13 m (43 ft)
- Time zone: UTC+5 (PST)

Rahu Abad (Sindhi: راھو آباد) (Urdu: راہو آباد) is a small town in Umerkot District of the Sindh Province in Pakistan. It is located about 7.5 kilometers away from Samaro, and its main industry is agriculture.

== History ==
This town was founded by Haji Ali Muhammad Rahu in 1976 . In 1979, Haji Ali Muhammad Rahu allotted his private land to the poor for their settlement. Over time, the population of Rahu Abad increased, and several shops and cabins were built in 1982. It is a center for agricultural trade.
