= PS-49 Umerkot-I =

Constituency of the Provincial Assembly of Sindh, Pakistan

- Constituency for the Provincial Assembly of Sindh
- Region: Pithoro Tehsil, Samaro Tehsil and Umerkot Tehsil (partly) of Umerkot District
- Electorate: 209,677

Current constituency
- Member: Vacant
- Created from: PS-69 Mirpurkhas-VI (2002-2018); PS-51 Umerkot-I (2018-2023)

PS-49 Umerkot-I (پی ایس-49، عمرکوٹ-1) is a constituency of the Provincial Assembly of Sindh.

== General elections 2024 ==
Provincial election 2024: PS-49 Umerkot-I
Party	Candidate	Votes	%	±%
PPP	Syed Sardar Ali Shah	52,286	56.24	
GDA	Khizar Hayat	24,563	26.42	
Independent	Ali Murad	5,042	5.42	
Independent	Akbar Ali (Note: Filed nomination papers as PTI candidate but ECP allowed him to run as an Independent)	4,126	4.44	
Independent	Bhooro	2,055	2.21	
Others	Others (eighteen candidates)	4,898	5.27	
Turnout		98,743	47.09	
Total valid votes		92,970	94.15	
Rejected ballots		5,773	5.85	
Majority		27,723	29.82	
Registered electors		209,677		
PPP hold				

== General elections 2018 ==
Provincial election 2018: PS-51 Umerkot-I
Party	Candidate	Votes	%	±%
PPP	Syed Sardar Ali Shah	58,680	61.86	
GDA	Faqir Muhammad Jadam Mangrio	29,842	31.46	
Independent	Sardar Ghulam Mustafa Khaskheli	3,768	3.97	
Independent	Khizar Hayat	583	0.61	
Independent	Kanji	516	0.54	
Independent	Khamiso	450	0.47	
PML(N)	Mariam Bai	383	0.40	
Independent	Syed Sarfraz Ali Shah	307	0.32	
Independent	Sartaj Ali Shah	101	0.11	
Independent	Muhammad Aslam	95	0.10	
MMA	Ishrat Naz	51	0.05	
SUP	Khadam Ali	29	0.03	
Independent	Abdul Raheem	23	0.02	
Independent	Ali Murad	18	0.02	
Independent	Ali Hyder Shah	13	0.01	
Majority		28,838	30.40	
Valid ballots		94,859		
Rejected ballots		5,098		
Turnout		99,957		
Registered electors		170,319		
hold				

== General elections 2013 ==
Contesting candidates	Party affiliation	Votes polled

== General elections 2008 ==
Contesting candidates	Party affiliation	Votes polled

== See also ==
- PS-48 Mirpur Khas-IV
- PS-50 Umerkot-II
