= PS-48 Mirpur Khas-IV =

Constituency of the Provincial Assembly of Sindh, Pakistan

- Constituency for the Provincial Assembly of Sindh
- Region: Jhuddo Tehsil and Digri Tehsil (partly) of Mirpur Khas District
- Electorate: 207,868

Current constituency
- Member: Mir Tariq Ali Khan Talpur
- Created from: PS-66 Mirpurkhas-III (2002-2018); PS-50 Mirpur Khas-IV (2018-2023)

PS-48 Mirpur Khas-IV (پی ایس-48، مِيرپورخاص-4) is a constituency of the Provincial Assembly of Sindh. https://www.electionpakistani.com/ge2024/ps/PS-48.htm

== General elections 2024 ==
Provincial election 2024: PS-48 Mirpur Khas-IV
Party	Candidate	Votes	%	±%
PPP	Mir Tariq Ali Khan Talpur	66,115	67.72	
GDA	Inayatullah	15,638	16.02	
Independent	Jahanian Shah	7,900	8.09	
JI	Muhammad Tahir	2,169	2.22	
TLP	Muhammad Waseem	1,601	1.64	
Independent	Shahdad Ali	1,524	1.56	
Others	Others (nine candidates)	2,683	2.75	
Turnout		102,472	49.30	
Total valid votes		97,630	95.28	
Rejected ballots		4,842	4.72	
Majority		50,477	51.70	
Registered electors		207,868		
PPP hold				

== General elections 2018 ==
Provincial election 2018: PS-50 Mirpurkhas-IV
Party	Candidate	Votes	%	±%
PPP	Tariq Ali	50,258	58.60	
GDA	Inayat Ullah	27,609	32.19	
Independent	Pahlaj Rai	3,184	3.71	
Independent	Arbab Ghulam Rahim	1,181	1.38	
Independent	Mir Zafar Ullah Khan Talpur	1,153	1.34	
PML(N)	Sajjad Ahmed	532	0.62	
Tabdeeli Pasand Party Pakistan	Mir Ejaz Ali Khan	527	0.61	
PRHP	Nazeer Ahmed	351	0.41	
Independent	Choudary Ahsan Gill	249	0.29	
PSP	Rukhsana	249	0.29	
MMA	Fozia Khalid	217	0.25	
Independent	Mir Hayat Khan	153	0.18	
AAT	Mukhtiar Ahmed	104	0.12	
Majority		22,649	26.41	
Valid ballots		85,767		
Rejected ballots		3,960		
Turnout		89,727		
Registered electors		167,155		
hold				

== General elections 2013 ==
Contesting candidates	Party affiliation	Votes polled

== General elections 2008 ==
Contesting candidates	Party affiliation	Votes polled

== See also ==
- PS-47 Mirpur Khas-III
- PS-49 Umerkot-I
