= Pir Shafqat Hussain Shah Jilani =

Pakistani politician

Member of the National Assembly of Pakistan
- In office 1 June 2013 – 31 May 2018
- Constituency: NA-226 (Mirpurkhas-cum-Umerkot-I)

Personal details
- Born: October 25, 1949 (age 77)
- Party: PMLN
- Relations: Aftab Hussain Shah Jillani (brother)

Pir Shafqat Hussain Shah Jilani (Urdu: پیر شفقت حسین شاہ جیلانی; born 25 October 1949) is a Pakistani politician who had been a member of the National Assembly of Pakistan, from June 2013 to May 2018. Died 11 September 2019

== Early life ==
He was born on 25 October 1949.

== Political career ==
He ran for the seat of the National Assembly of Pakistan as an independent candidate from Constituency NA-226 (Mirpurkhas-cum-Umerkot-I) in the 2008 Pakistani general election but was unsuccessful. He received 81 votes and lost the seat to Aftab Hussain Shah Jillani.

He was elected to the National Assembly as a candidate of Pakistan Peoples Party (PPP) from Constituency NA-226 (Mirpurkhas-cum-Umerkot-I) in the 2013 Pakistani general election. He received 82,017 votes and defeated Shabbir Ahmed Qaimkhani, a candidate of Muttahida Qaumi Movement (MQM).
