= Jhudo railway station =

Railway station in Sindh, Pakistan

Jhudo railway station جهڏو ريلوي اسٽيشن

General information
- Owner: Ministry of Railways

Other information
- Station code: JDO

History
- Former names: Great Indian Peninsula Railway

Jhudo railway station (Urdu: جھڈو ریلوے اسٹیشن, Sindhi: جهڏو ريلوي اسٽيشن) is located in Sindh, Pakistan.

== See also ==
- Jhuddo
- List of railway stations in Pakistan
- Pakistan Railways
