= Abdul Majid Bhurgri Institute of Language Engineering =

Pakistani research institute

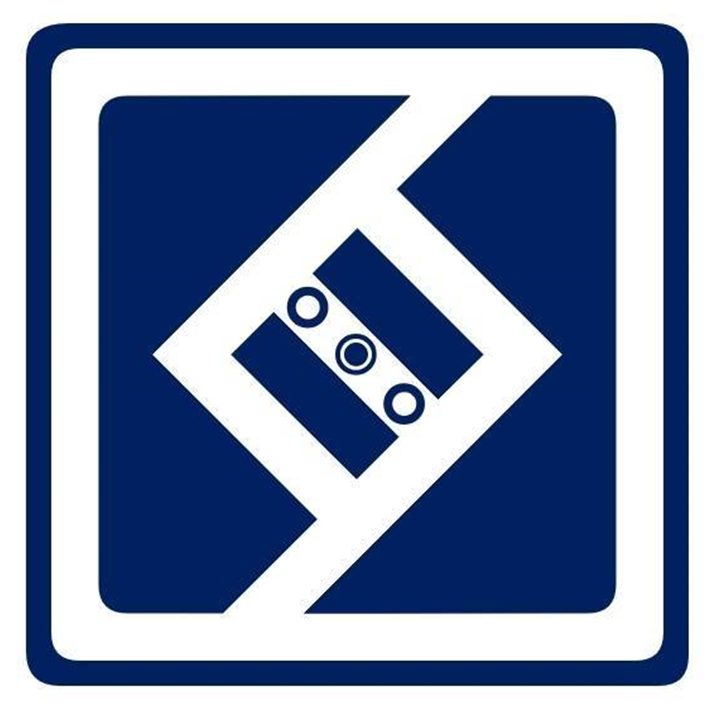

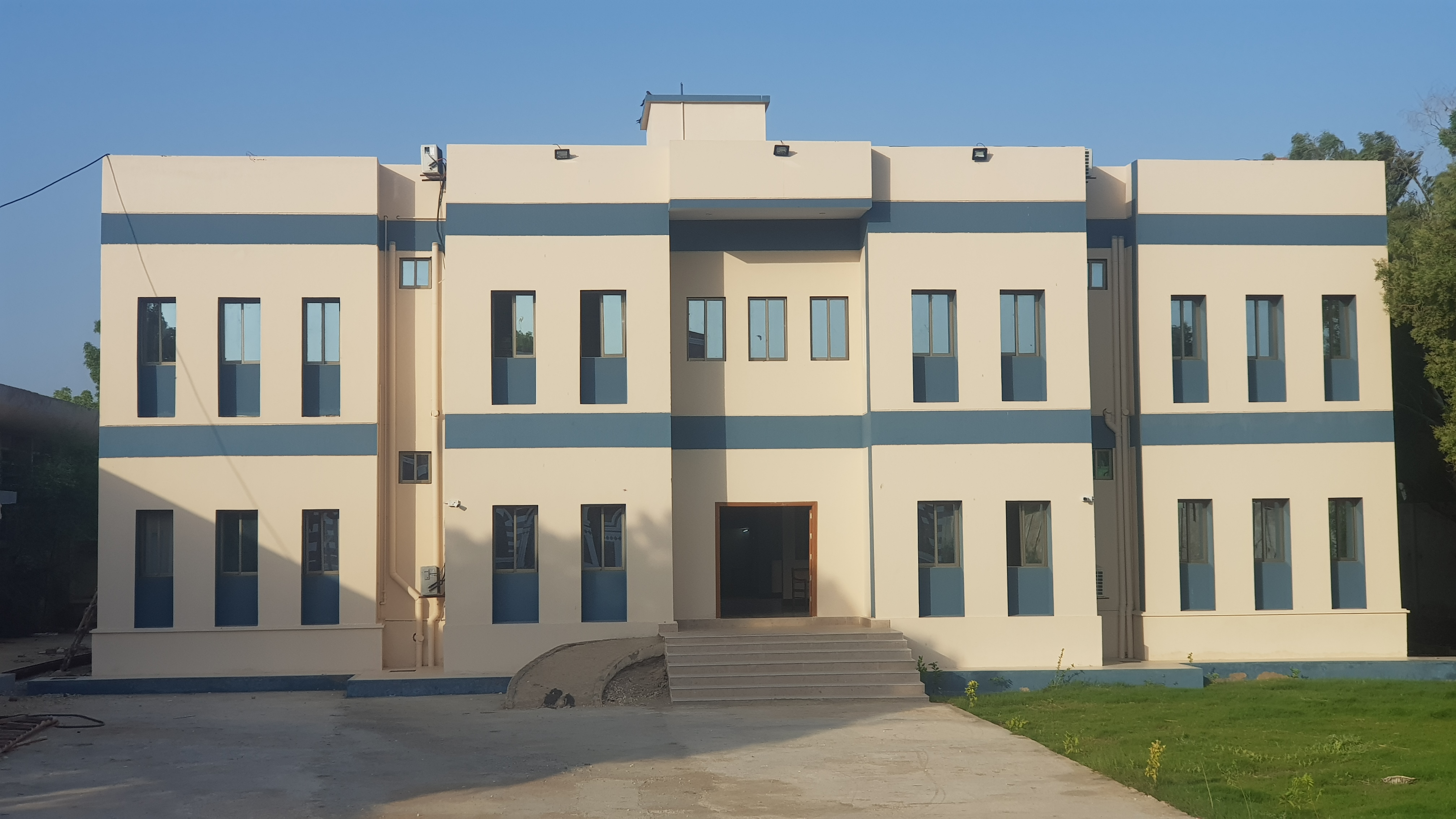
- Native name: عبدالماجد ڀرڳڙي انسٽيٽيوٽ آف لئنگئيج انجنيئرنگ
- Type: Autonomous Institute
- Industry: Computational linguistics
- Founded: 2019
- Founder: Amar Fayaz Buriro
- Headquarters: N-5, National Highway, Hyderabad, Sindh, Pakistan
- Area served: Language engineering of Sindhi language in all Computational linguistics.
- Key people: Syed Sardar Ali Shah, Abdul-Majid Bhurgri, Amar Fayaz Buriro, Shabir Kumbhar
- Products: Research, Application software
- Owner: Government of Sindh
- Parent: Culture, Tourism & Antiquities Department, Government of Sindh
- Website: ambile.pk

Abdul Majid Bhurgri Institute of Language Engineering (Sindhi: عبدالماجد ڀرڳڙي انسٽيٽيوٽ آف لئنگئيج انجنيئرنگ) is an autonomous body under the administrative control of the Culture, Tourism and Antiquities Department, Government of Sindh established for bringing Sindhi language at par with national and international languages in all computational process and Natural language processing.

== Establishment ==
In recognition to services of Abdul-Majid Bhurgri, who is the founder of Sindhi computing, Government of Sindh has established the institute after his name. The institute was primarily initiated on the concept given by a language engineer and linguist Amar Fayaz Buriro in briefing to the Minister, Culture, Tourism and Antiquities, Government of Sindh, Syed Sardar Ali Shah on 21 February 2017 on celebration of International Mother Language Day in Sindhi Language Authority, Hyderabad, Sindh. After the presentation and concept given by Amar Fayaz Buriro, the minister Syed Sardar Ali Shah had announced the Institute. Then, Government of Sindh added the development scheme in the Budget of fiscal year 2017-2018.

== Projects ==
The Institute has developed several projects aimed at advancing the Sindhi language and promoting linguistic research. Notable initiatives include the AMBILE Hamiz Ali Sindhi Optical character recognition, which allows for the accurate digitization of Sindhi text, and the ongoing Sindhi WordNet System, a project to build a comprehensive lexical database for Natural language processing. The institute has also created the Font, which integrates symbols from the Indus script, Khudabadi script, and modern Perso-Arabic Script Code for Information Interchange into a single resource for researchers]. Additionally, institute has developed online converter tools that automatically transliterate between the Arabic-Perso script and Devanagari script, improving linguistic accessibility. Another key project is Bhittaipedia, a digital platform dedicated to the preservation and dissemination of the poetry of Shah Abdul Latif Bhittai, one of Sindh's most renowned poet.

== Location ==
The institute is established behind Sindh Museum and Sindhi Language Authority, N-5 National Highway, Qasimabad, Hyderabad, Sindh.
