= Mir Tariq Ali Khan Talpur =

Pakistani politician

Member of the Provincial Assembly of Sindh
- In office 18 August 2018 – 11 August 2023
- Constituency: PS-48 Mirpur Khas-IV

Personal details
- Party: PPP (2018-present)

Mir Tariq Ali Khan Talpur is a Pakistani politician who had been a member of the Provincial Assembly of Sindh from August 2018 till August 2023. In 2024 general elections of Pakistan he elected back from PS-48 with a popular lead of 50,000 votes against his rival Inayatullah Arbab.

== Political career ==
He was elected to the Provincial Assembly of Sindh as a candidate of Pakistan Peoples Party from Constituency PS-50 (Mirpur Khas-IV) in the 2018 Pakistani general election.
