= Jhuddo =

Coordinates: 24°58′00″N 69°18′00″E

- Interactive map of Jhuddo
- Country: Pakistan
- Province: Sindh

Population (2023)
  - Total: 37,379

Jhuddo (Sindhi: جهڏو) (or Jhudo) is a town in Mirpur Khas District, Sindh province, Pakistan. It is in Jhuddo Tehsil. At the 2023 census, the Jhudo Town Committee had a population of 37,379, up from 32,215 in 2017. Its postcode is 69310.

== See also ==
- Jhudo railway station
