= Syed Zulfiqar Ali Shah =

Pakistani politician

- سيد ذوالفقار علي شاھ
- Constituency: PS-46 Mirpur Khas-II

Member of the Provincial Assembly of Sindh
- Incumbent
- Assumed office 24 February 2024

Personal details
- Party: PPP (2024-present)

Syed Zulfiqar Ali Shah (Sindhi: سيد ذوالفقار علي شاھ) is a Pakistani politician who had been a member of the Provincial Assembly of Sindh since 24 February 2024. He was also elected as member of the Provincial Assembly of Sindh from August 2018 till August 2023.

== Political career ==
He was elected to the Provincial Assembly of Sindh as a candidate of Pakistan Peoples Party from Constituency PS-46 (Mirpur Khas-II) in the 2024 Pakistani general election.
