= Sindhri Tehsil =

Sindhri Taluka
- Location in Sindh
- Coordinates: 25°09′24″N 69°06′44″E
- Country: Pakistan
- Region: Mirpurkhas

Government
  - Type: Taluka Municipality

Area
  - Urban: 4 km^{2} (1.5 sq mi)

Population
  - Urban: 50,000 approximately
- Time zone: PST
- Postal code: 69330
- Area code: 92(0233)

Sindhri is a taluka (administrative subdivision) in the District of Mirpurkhas, in the Sindh province of Pakistan. It is renowned for its agricultural productivity, especially for being the origin of the famous Sindhri mango, one of the most popular and sought-after mango varieties in Pakistan.
