= PS-46 Mirpur Khas-II =

Constituency of the Provincial Assembly of Sindh, Pakistan

- Constituency for the Provincial Assembly of Sindh
- Region: Sindhri Tehsil, Shujabad Tehsil (partly) and Mirpur Khas Tehsil(partly) of Mirpur Khas District
- Electorate: 189,883

Current constituency
- Member: Vacant
- Created from: PS-65 Mirpurkhas-II (2002-2018); PS-48 Mirpur Khas-II (2018-2023)

PS-46 Mirpur Khas-II (پی ایس-46، مِيرپورخاص-2) is a constituency of the Provincial Assembly of Sindh.

== General elections 2024 ==
Provincial election 2024: PS-46 Mirpur Khas-II
| Party | Candidate | Votes | % | ±% |
|---|---|---|---|---|
| PPP | Syed Zulfiqar Ali Shah | 51,656 | 60.11 | |
| Independent | Shuja Muhammad Shah | 30,096 | 35.02 | |
| Others | Others (fifteen candidates) | 4,187 | 4.87 | |
| Turnout | | 89,612 | 47.19 | |
| Total valid votes | | 85,939 | 95.90 | |
| Rejected ballots | | 3,673 | 4.10 | |
| Majority | | 21,560 | 25.09 | |
| Registered electors | | 189,883 | | |
| PPP hold | | | | |

== General elections 2018 ==
Provincial election 2018: PS-48 Mirpurkhas-II
| Party | Candidate | Votes | % | ±% |
|---|---|---|---|---|
| PPP | Syed Zulfiqar Ali Shah | 38,112 | 48.20 | |
| Independent | Ali Nawaz Shah | 36,271 | 45.87 | |
| PTI | Chanesar | 1,481 | 1.87 | |
| Independent | Radha | 1,190 | 1.51 | |
| PRHP | Muhammad Arshad | 452 | 0.57 | |
| TLP | Khalid Hussain | 431 | 0.55 | |
| PML(N) | Roop Chand | 348 | 0.44 | |
| Independent | Shahnawaz | 295 | 0.37 | |
| Tabdeeli Pasand Party Pakistan | Masood Ahmed Wasan | 160 | 0.20 | |
| MQM-P | Mir Shah Muhammad Talpur | 154 | 0.19 | |
| Independent | Ghulam Jaffar Junejo | 98 | 0.12 | |
| Independent | Mir Jawad Afsar Talpur | 59 | 0.07 | |
| PSP | Sher Khan Rajput | 17 | 0.02 | |
| Majority | | 1,841 | 2.33 | |
| Valid ballots | | 79,068 | | |
| Rejected ballots | | 3,241 | | |
| Turnout | | 82,316 | | |
| Registered electors | | 151,736 | | |
| PPP hold | | | | |

== General elections 2013 ==
| Contesting candidates | Party affiliation | Votes polled |

== General elections 2008 ==
| Contesting candidates | Party affiliation | Votes polled |

== See also ==
- PS-45 Mirpur Khas-I
- PS-47 Mirpur Khas-III
