= Shujabad Tehsil, Sindh =

Tehsil in Mirpurkhas District, Sindh, Pakistan

Shujabad Tehsil
- Tehsil
- Country: Pakistan
- Province: Sindh
- District: Mirpurkhas District
- Established: 2012

Population (2023)
  - Total: 185,654

Shujabad Tehsil (also rendered as Shujabad Taluka) is an administrative subdivision of Mirpurkhas District in the province of Sindh, Pakistan. It was established in 2012 and takes its name from Shuja Mohammad Shah, the father of the then Sindh Minister for Agriculture, Syed Ali Nawaz Shah. According to the 2023 census, the tehsil had a population of 185,654.

== History ==
Shujabad Tehsil was created in 2012 when it was notified as a new administrative unit within Mirpurkhas District. It was named after Shuja Mohammad Shah, father of Syed Ali Nawaz Shah, who at the time served as Sindh's Minister for Agriculture.

== Administration ==
The tehsil comprises three union councils: Mirwah Gorchani, Makhan Sammu and Jhilori.

== Demographics ==
=== Population ===
According to the 2023 Population and Housing Census conducted by the Pakistan Bureau of Statistics, Shujabad Tehsil had a total population of 185,654. The literacy rate of the tehsil stood at 39.46 per cent.

=== Religion ===
Religion in Shujabad Tehsil (2023)
| Religion | Percent |
| Islam | 49.11% |
| Hinduism | 50.24% |
| Other or not stated | 0.65% |

According to the 2023 census, Hinduism is practised by approximately half of the tehsil's population, with Muslims comprising a closely comparable proportion.
