= Samaro =

Pakistani town

Samaro سمارو
- Town
- Location within Sindh Location within Pakistan
- Coordinates: 25°17′5″N 69°23′45″E
- Country: Pakistan
- Province: Sindh
- District: Umarkot

Government
  - Chairman: Wadero Zulfiqar Ali
- Elevation: 11 m (36 ft)
- Time zone: UTC+5 (PST)

Samaro (Urdu: سمارو) is a tehsil in the Sindh province of Pakistan. The town is the headquarters of a tehsil (an administrative subdivision) of Umarkot District.

== History ==
During British rule, the town was renamed Jamesabad (literally "Jamestown" – not to be confused with Jamesabad in Punjab) and was a subdivision of the old Tharparkar District (which had larger boundaries than today.)

The taluka of Jamesabad was part of the Bombay Presidency, lying between 24°50' and 25°28' N. and 69°14' and 69°35′E and had an area of 505 square miles (1,310 km^{2}). According to the 1901 census the population was 24,038 – an increase almost 5,000 since the 1891 (19,208). The density of 48 persons per square mile was considerably above the District average. The Taluka contained 184 villages, of which Jamesabad was headquarters. The land revenue and cesses 1903-4 amounted to 370,000.

Now Samaro in District Umerkot. Samaro road is 7 km northeast from Samaro City it also developing area in Samaro.Rahu Abad is another neighbouring stop which is 7.5 kilometres away from Samaro, Many development projects were carried out with many roads, the city's and surrounding areas' infrastructure, education, health sector and other basic necessities were the top priorities.

== Religion ==
Religions in Samaro taluka (2023)
Religion	Percent
Hinduism	53.98%
Islam	45.87%
Other or not stated	0.15%

Hinduism is followed by the majority of the taluka's population, while Muslims form a significant minority. The taluka has also reported multiple cases of forced conversions of minor Hindu girls.

== Notable people ==
- Pushpa Kumari Kohli, first Hindu woman to become a police officer in Pakistan
