= Jamesabad =

Coordinates: 30°21′00″N 71°51′00″E

Jamesabad is a town of Khanewal District in the Punjab province of Pakistan. It is located at 30°21'0N 71°50'60E with an altitude of 131 metres (433 feet).
