= Sindhri =

Mango cultivar

Mangifera 'Sindhri'
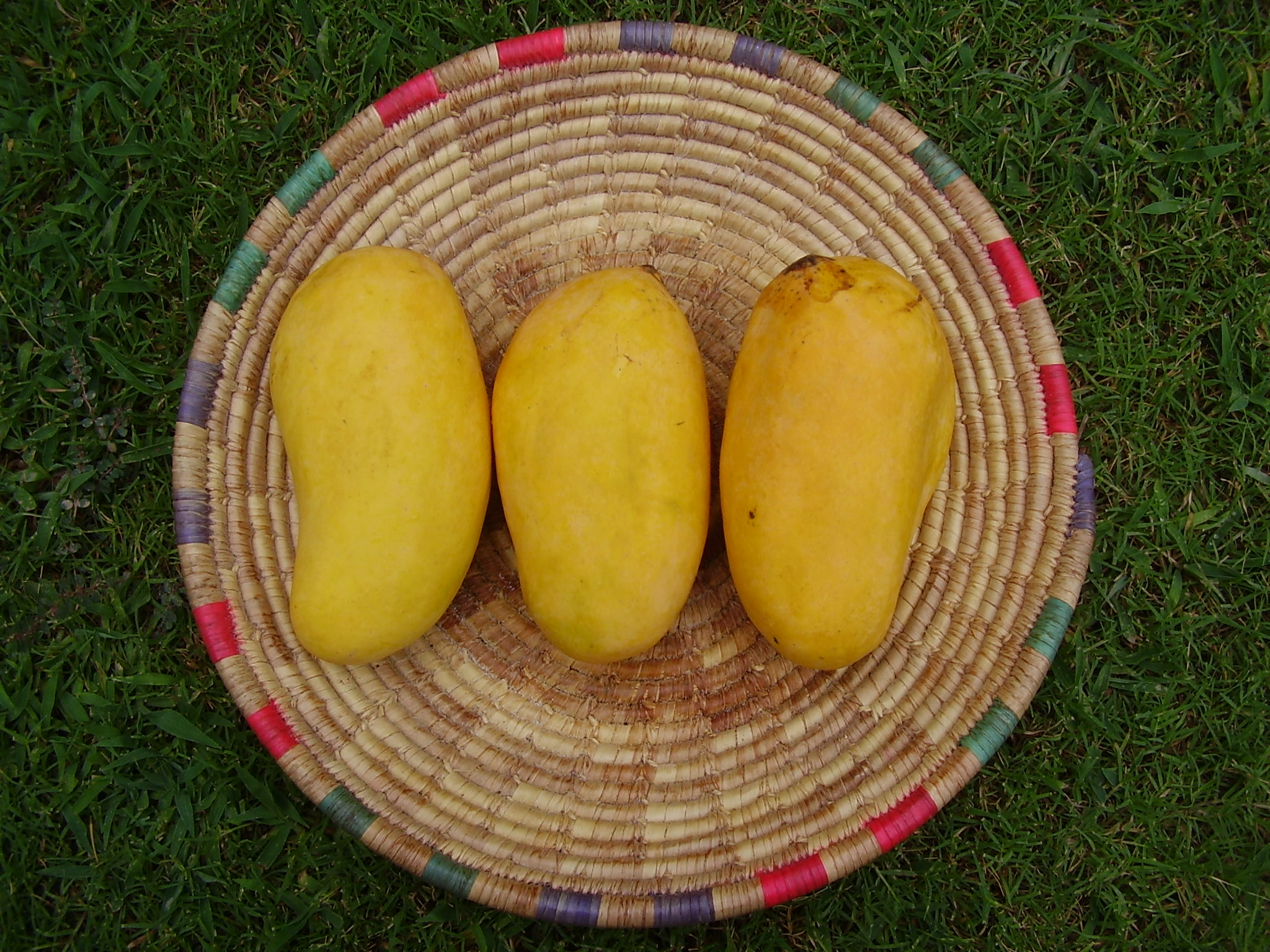
- Genus: Mangifera
- Species: Mangifera indica
- Cultivar: 'Sindhri'
- Origin: Mirpur Khas, Sindh, Pakistan

The Sindhri (Sindhi: سنڌڙي) mango is a mango cultivar grown in Sindhri, a town in Sindh, and other areas of Sindh province in Pakistan. It is a large oval shaped mango which is sweet, aromatic, and somewhat tart. It is highly prized by the inhabitants of Sindh. It has thin peelable skin, deep yellow compact fibre-free flesh and a thin stone, and a longer shelf life than most other Pakistani varieties. It is an early-season, low-yielding cultivar, and is registered as a geographical indication in Pakistan.

== See also ==
- List of mango cultivars
