= Mirpur Khas District =

District in Sindh, Pakistan

Mirpur Khas District ضلع میرپور خاص ميرپور خاص ضلعو
- District
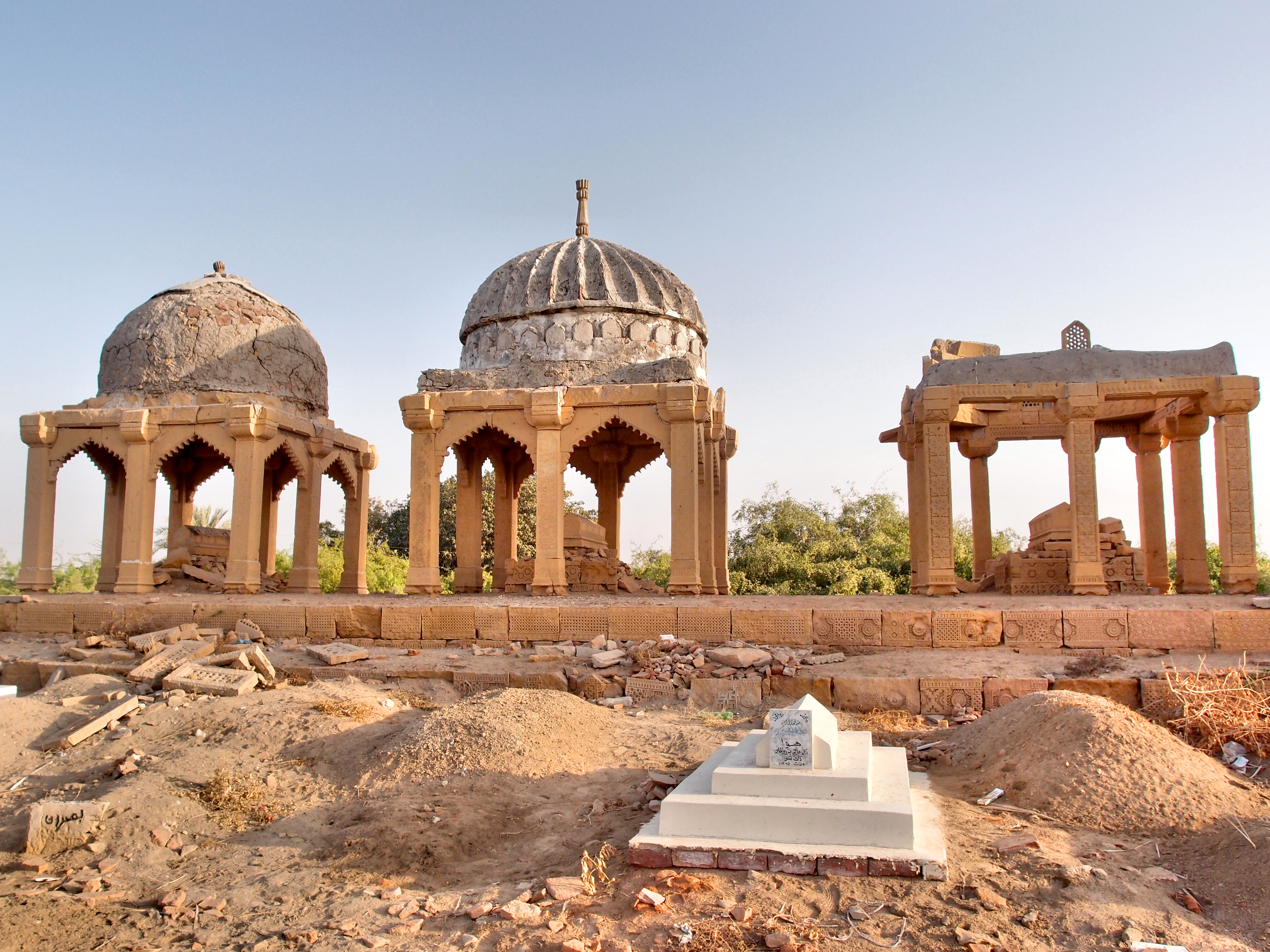
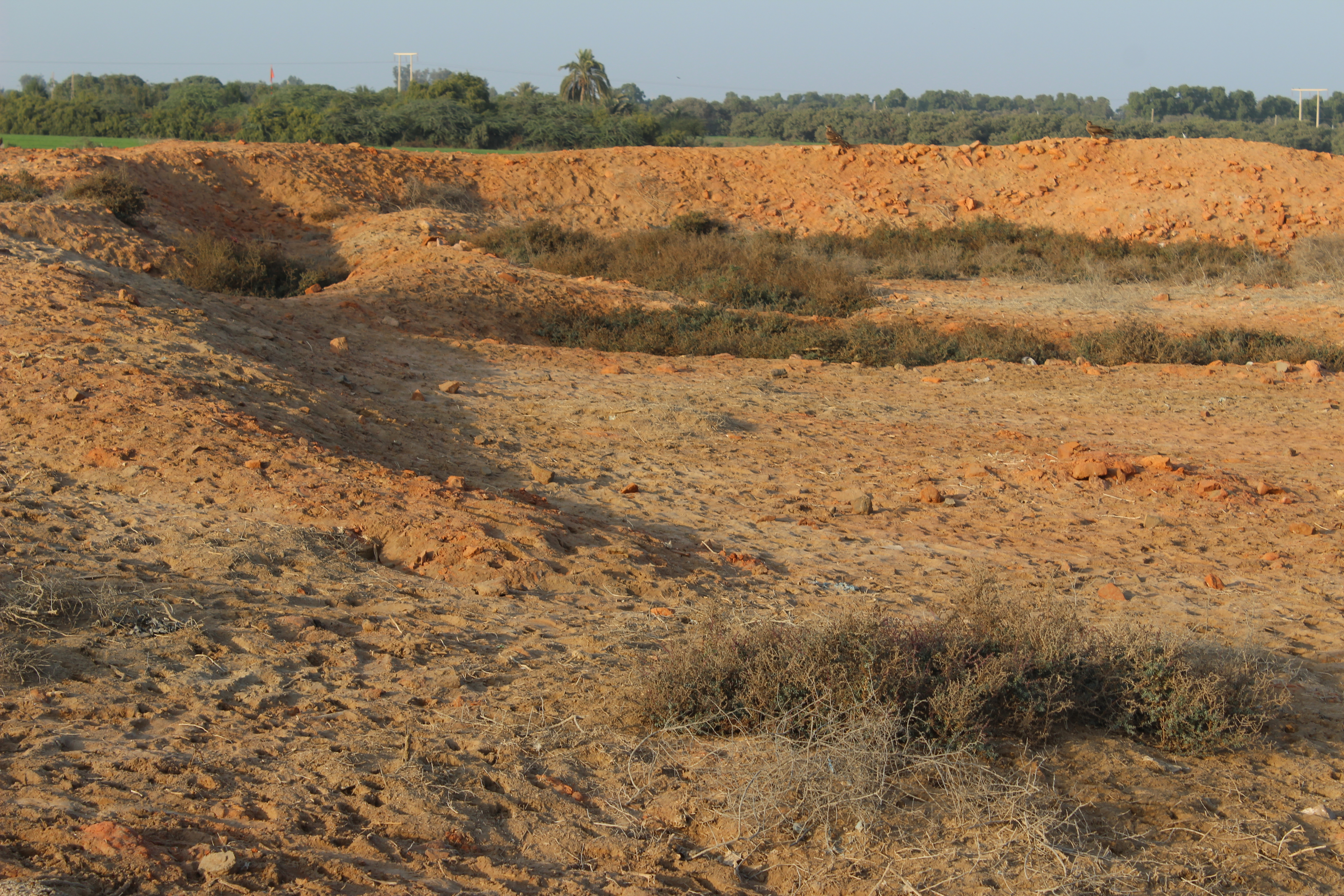
- Top: Tombs at Chitorri; Bottom: Buddhist stupa at Kahujodaro

- Location of Mirpurkhas in Sindh province
- Coordinates: 25°33′02″N 069°00′11″E
- Country: Pakistan
- Province: Sindh
- Division: Mirpur Khas
- Established: 31 October 1990; 35 years ago
- Headquarters: Mirpur Khas
- Administrative Towns: 07: Jhuddo Taluka Mirpur Khas Taluka Digri Taluka Hussain Bux Mari Kot Ghulam Muhammad Taluka Sindhri Taluka Shujaabad Taluka

Government
  - Type: District Administration
  - Deputy Commissioner: Dr Rasheed Masud Khan
  - Constituensy: NA-211 Mirpur Khas-I; NA-212 Mirpur Khas-II

Area
  - District: 2,925 km^{2} (1,129 sq mi)
- Elevation: 17 m (56 ft)

Population (2023)
  - District: 1,681,386
  - Density: 574.8/km^{2} (1,489/sq mi)
  - Urban: 492,175
  - Rural: 1,189,211

Literacy
  - Literacy rate: Total: 45.37%; Male: 55.04%; Female: 34.75%
- Time zone: UTC+05:00 (PKT)
  - Summer (DST): DST is not observed
- ZIP Code: 69000
- NWD (area) code: 233
- ISO 3166 code: PK-SD

Mirpur Khas District (Sindhi: ضلعو ميرپورخاص, Urdu: ضلع مِيرپورخاص) is one of the districts of Mirpur Khas Division in the province of Sindh, Pakistan. Its capital is Mirpur Khas city. District Mirpur Khas became a district after separating from Tharparkar District on 31 October 1990. According to the 2023 Pakistani census, the population of Mirpur Khas district is 1,680,980 (1.68 million).

== Administrative divisions ==
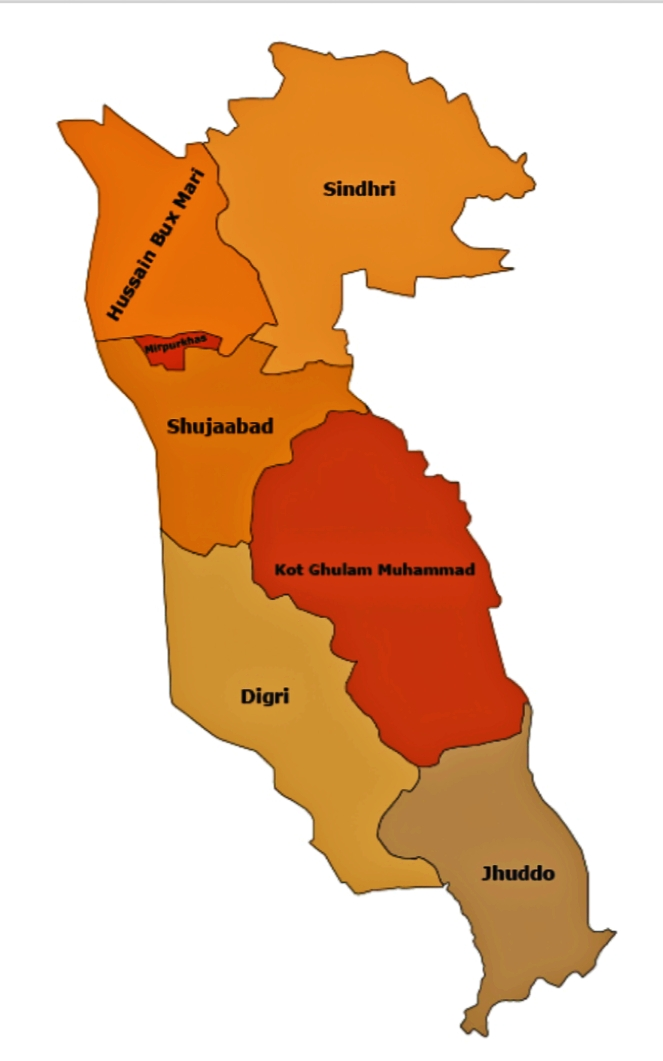
Tehsils of Mirpurkhas district

The district of Mirpur Khas is sub-divided into 7 tehsils:

- Digri Tehsil
- Kot Ghulam Muhammad Tehsil
- Mirpur Khas Tehsil
- Jhuddo Tehsil
- Sindhri Tehsil
- Hussain Bux Mari Tehsil
- Shujaabad Tehsil

== History ==
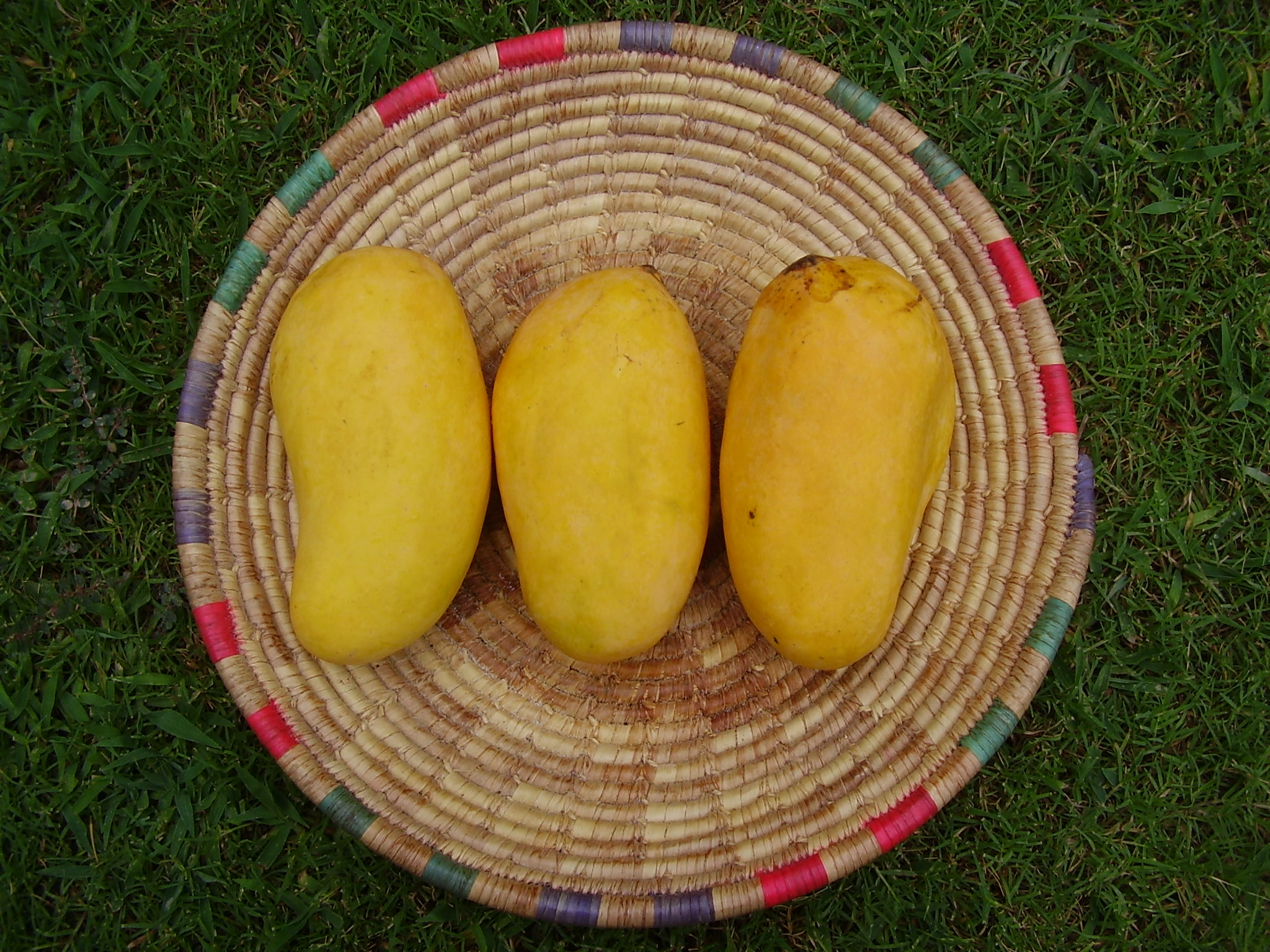
Sindhri origination in Mirpur Khas District is among the ten leading mango varieties in the world

After the capture of Sindh by the British, In 1882 they created Thar and Parkar District in Southeastern Sindh for administrative purposes. In 1906, the district headquarters was moved from Amarkot (now Umerkot) to Mirpur Khas. In 1953, after the creation of Pakistan, some area on the northern side was detached from the original Tharparkar District and named Sanghar District. On 31 October 1990 the district was divided into the Tharparkar and Mirpur Khas Districts. In the same year, Mirpur Khas also get the status of divisional headquarter.

Mirpur Khas District derives its name from the town of Mirpur Khas, founded by Mir Ali Murad Talpur in 1806.

== Demographics ==
Historical population
Year	Pop.	±% p.a.
1951		—
1961		—
1972		—
1981		—
1998	1,006,329	—
2017	1,504,440	+2.14%
2023	1,681,386	+1.87%

As of the 2023 census, Mirpur Khas district has 312,986 households and a population of 1,681,386. The district has a sex ratio of 110.36 males to 100 females and a literacy rate of 45.37%: 55.04% for males and 34.75% for females. 537,553 (31.98% of the surveyed population) are under 10 years of age. 492,175 (29.27%) live in urban areas.

=== Religion ===
Religions in Mirpur Khas district (2023)
Religion	Percent
Islam	57.99%
Hinduism	41.48%
Christianity	0.42%
Other or not stated	0.11%

Religion in contemporary Mirpur Khas District
Religious group	1941 (Note: Note: 1941 census data is for Digri, Jamesabad, Mirpur Khas talukas and part of Khipro taluk of Tharparkar District, which roughly corresponds to contemporary Mirpur Khas District. The ratio of population of Khipro district which became part of Sindhri taluka was determined from 1951-1998 census data.)		2017		2023	
Religious group	Pop.	%	Pop.	%	Pop.	%
Islam	93,405	49.24%	913,979	60.75%	974,734	57.99%
Hinduism	91,263	48.11%	582,879	38.74%	697,318	41.48%
Sikhism	4,502	2.37%	—N/a	—N/a	35	~0%
Christianity	125	0.07%	5,734	0.38%	7,082	0.42%
Ahmadi	—N/a	—N/a	1,769	0.12%	1,286	0.08%
Others (Note: Including Jainism, Christianity, Buddhism, Zoroastrianism, Judaism, Ad-Dharmis, or not stated)	403	0.21%	79	0.01%	525	0.03%
Total Population	189,698	100%	1,504,440	100%	1,680,980	100%

The majority religion is Islam, with 57.99% of the population. Hinduism (including those from Scheduled Castes) is practiced by 41.48% of the population. In rural areas, Muslims and Hindus are in nearly equal numbers.

Population of taluks by religion
Circle	Muslims	Hindus	Others
Digri	57.4%	42.36%	0.24%
Hussain Bux Mari	55.17%	44.26%	0.57%
Jhudo	55.02%	44.58%	0.40%
Kot Ghulam Muhammad	40.53%	59.32%	0.15%
Mirpur Khas	90.38%	8.05%	1.57%
Shujabad	49.11%	50.24%	0.65%
Sindhri	54.33%	45.58%	0.09%

=== Language ===
Languages of Mirpur Khas district (2023)
1. Sindhi (73.7%)
2. Urdu (11.9%)
3. Punjabi (6.27%)
4. Balochi (1.65%)
5. Hindko (1.63%)
6. Others (4.82%)

At the time of the 2023 census, 73.7% of the population spoke Sindhi, 11.93% Urdu, 6.27% Punjabi, 1.65% Balochi and 6.65% Others various tongues as their first language.

== See also ==
- Pushpa Kumari Kohli
- Mirpur Khas
- Sindhri
