= Ali Nawaz Shah =

Syed Ali Nawaz Shah Rizvi (born 1 January 1942) is a Pakistani politician.

== Education ==
Rizvi was born in Mirpur Khas, Sindh. He held various representative offices of the student communities at almost all the educational institutions he attended. He was an active student leader and was the General Secretary of the Students Union at the Government College, Hyderabad and also at the Law College, Hyderabad. He has been the President of the Inter-Collegiate Body of Sindh and General Secretary of the Council of Pakistan Unity.

He was pronounced as the "Best Boy" of the Government College Hyderabad and enjoyed the honour of being the first student of the college to be elected unopposed as General Secretary of the Students Union. He was the winner of the highest award of the college-the Gentleman's Prize – and also that of the best social worker.

== Political career ==
He joined the Pakistan Peoples Party in Hyderabad and became Divisional President of the party.

Rizvi was elected as a member of the Provincial Assembly of Sindh in 1977 and again in 1990. As a political activist, he was arrested several times between 1977 and 1985 for his participation in the Movement for the Restoration of Democracy in the country.

He was a member of the National Assembly of Pakistan from 1988 to 1990 and was a member of the Federal Cabinet in 1989–90. He was Minister of Industries (1988).

He was also President of the PPP in Hyderabad.

He was elected as member of the Senate of Pakistan in March 1994 for a six-year term. He was a member of the Senate Standing Committees on Foreign Affairs, Kashmir Affairs and Northern Affairs and on Interior, Narcotics Control and States and Frontier Regions and also on Functional Committee on Rules of Procedure and Privileges.

As of 2008, he is a member of the Federal Council and of the Central Executive Committee of the PPP.
