= Digri Tehsil =

Tehsil in Mirpurkhas, Sindh

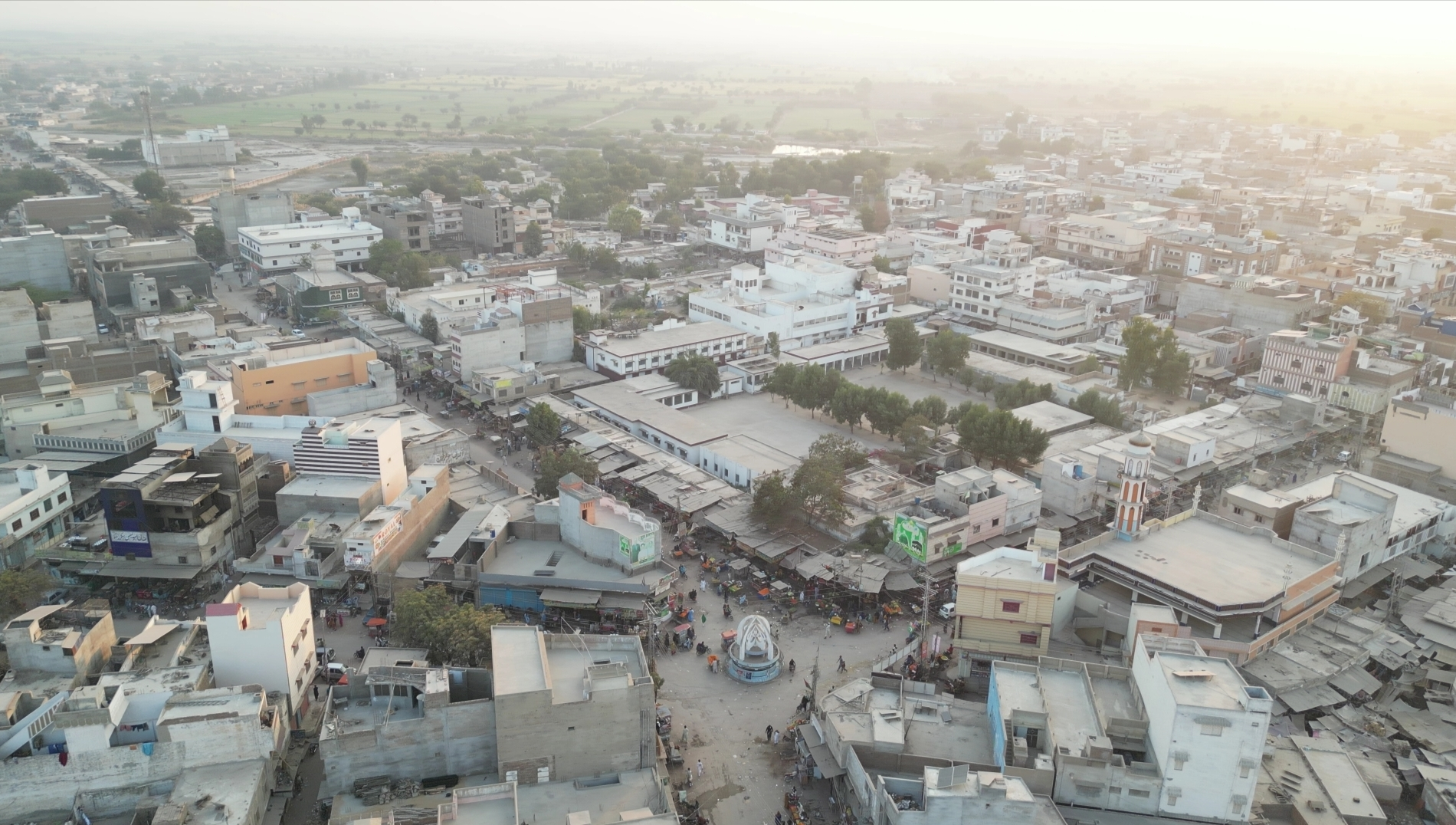
- Aerial view of Digri town

- Location in Sindh Digri Tehsil (Pakistan)
- Coordinates: 25°09′24″N 69°06′44″E
- Country: Pakistan
- Province: Sindh
- District: Mirpur Khas

Area
  - Tehsil: 572 km^{2} (221 sq mi)
  - Urban: 4 km^{2} (1.5 sq mi)

Population (2023)
  - Tehsil: 234,578
  - Density: 410/km^{2} (1,060/sq mi)
  - Urban: 82,962
- Time zone: PST
- Postal code: 69330
- Area code: 92(0233)

Digri (Sindhi: ڊگھڙي, Urdu: ڈگری) is a tehsil in the Mirpur Khas District of Sindh, Pakistan. It is the second largest town of the district.

== Geography ==
Digri is connected to several towns by main roads:

- Tando Ghulam Ali Road (District Badin)
- Tando Bhago Road (District Badin)
- Mipurkhas Road
- KGM Road - Linking to District Umarkot
- TJM Road - Linking to Tharparkar

== Communities ==
Religions in Digri tehsil (2023)
Religion	Percent
Islam	57.40%
Hinduism	42.36%
Other or not stated	0.24%

Digri is a culturally diverse town. As the small town has grown rapidly in the last few decades, the diversity has also increased with Arains, Talpurs, Malhis, Lohanas, Maheshwari, Kolhis, Bheels, Muslim Rajputs, Kaimkhanis, Jarwars, Baloch, Jatt and Pashtuns living there. 75% of the population of Digri are Sindhi people. The most common languages in the town are Sindhi and Urdu and also tribal languages like Dhatki as well.

Languages of Digri tehsil (2023)
1. Sindhi (75.0%)
2. Punjabi (12.1%)
3. Urdu (4.59%)
4. Hindko (4.59%)
5. Others (3.73%)

There are many communities have been living since the partition of Hindustan.

== Economy ==
Livestock and poultry rearing, agricultural farms, and transportation are the main sources of income, while more than 20% population rely on government and private jobs. Digri Sugar Mills, one of the oldest sugar mills in Sindh, is on the Matli–Tando Ghulam Ali Road in Digri taluka and has a crushing capacity of 7,000 tonnes of sugarcane per day. In 2018 the National Electric Power Regulatory Authority granted its subsidiary, Digri-Gen Limited, a generation licence for a 25 MW power plant in Digri taluka that runs on bagasse.
