= List of people from Lahore =

This is a list of people who were born in Lahore or are otherwise known for their association with the city.

== Actors and filmmakers ==
- Ahmad Ali Butt
- Ali Ejaz
- Amanullah, comedian
- Amina Haq
- Anoushay Abbasi
- Anwar Kamal Pasha, film director and producer
- Ayesha Sana
- Ayesha Omar
- Badar Khalil
- Bahar Begum
- Chetan Anand, film maker
- David Gooderson
- Dev Anand
- Faysal Quraishi
- Fawad Afzal
- Gabrielle Drake
- Iman Ali
- Jana Malik
- Janita Asma
- Kabir Bedi
- Kamini Kaushal
- Khalid Abbas Dar
- Khawaja Khurshid Anwar, filmmaker, writer, director, composer
- Kuldip Kaur
- Maya Ali, actress
- Meena Shorey
- Meera
- Muamar Rana
- Navin Nischol
- Nirma, actress
- Percy Brandt
- Prem Chopra, Bollywood and Punjabi film actor
- Rabia Butt
- Rasheed Attre, music director (grandfather of Jimmy Attre)
- Reema Khan, actress
- Saba Hameed, Pakistani television actress
- Saeed Khan Rangeela, Lollywood actor, singer and director
- Sajal Ali, actress
- Dur e Fishan Slaeem, television actress
- Sami Khan
- Sarmad Khoosat
- Shaan, actor
- Shahid, actor
- Shamim Bano
- Shaukat Hussain Rizvi, actor, director, producer
- Syed Ishrat Abbas
- Syed Noor
- Wahaj Ali, actor
- Vaneeza Ahmed
- Yawar Hayat Khan, TV director and producer
- Yash Chopra, Bollywood director and producer
- Ali Zafar, actor

== Artists ==
- Abdur Rahman Chughtai
- Ajaz Anwar
- Amrita Sher-Gil
- Anna Molka Ahmed
- Bhai Ram Singh, architect
- Nayyar Ali Dada, architect
- Rashid Rana, artist
- Salima Hashmi
- Shakir Ali, artist, art teacher, former head of the National College of Arts in Lahore
- Shahzia Sikander, artist
- Sir Ganga Ram, philanthropist, architect, civil engineer, and agriculturist
- Zahoor ul Akhlaq

== Businessmen ==
- Michael Chowdry, businessman
- Shahid Khan, richest person of Pakistani birth
- Mian Muhammad Mansha
- Syed Babar Ali

== Economists ==
- Salman Shah, economist
- Shahid Javed Burki

== Journalists ==
- Ahmed Rashid
- Agha Shorish Kashmiri
- Janbaz Mirza
- Kamran Shahid
- Khushwant Singh, novelist and journalist
- Mazhar Ali Khan, socialist journalist
- Hamid Mir, newscaster, writer, outstanding journalist; currently employed in Geo News
- Hassan Nisar, columnist and anchor person
- Naeem Baig, novelist and short story writer
- Olive Christian Malvery, investigative journalist
- Sohail Warraich
- Arif Nizami, founder of Pakistan Today

== Medical professionals ==
- Amna Buttar, medical doctor
- Farid Ahmad Khan, Pakistani doctor and plastic surgeon who served as chairman and Dean of Shaikh Zayed Medical Complex from 2015 to 2018, and Registrar of King Edward Medical University from 2011 to 2015

== Music and dance ==
- Abrar ul Haq
- Ali Azmat
- Ali Zafar
- Amanat Ali Khan
- Annie Khalid
- Meesha Shafi
- Asad Amanat Ali Khan
- Atif Aslam
- Bilal Khan, singer
- Chahat Fateh Ali Khan
- Farida Khanum
- Ghulam Ahmed Chishti
- Humera Arshad
- Inayat Hussain, composer
- Iqbal Bahu
- Iqbal Bano
- Irene Perveen
- Jawad Ahmad
- Khwaja Khurshid Anwar
- Maharaj Ghulam Hussain Kathak
- Malika Pukhraj
- Musarrat Nazir
- Noor Jehan, playback singer and actress
- Nusrat Fateh Ali Khan
- O. P. Nayyar, film music director and composer
- Rashid Attre, film music director and composer
- Shafqat Amanat Ali
- Shamshad Begum
- Shiraz Uppal, singer and songwriter
- Tahira Syed
- Waris Baig
- Sahir Ali Bagga
- Saieen Zahoor, Sufi singer and dancer
- Zayn Malik, British singer-songwriter of Pakistani descent whose father is from Lahore
- Wooly and the Uke, singer

== Lawyers ==
- Justice Sir Mian Shah Din, the first Muslim judge of the Punjab Chief Court
- Akram Sheikh
- Ahmad Awais
- S M Zafar
- Asma Jahangir
- Allah Bukhsh Karim Bukhsh Brohi
- Aitzaz Ahsan, barrister of Gray's Inn
- Abdul Ghafoor Bhurgri
- Fakhruddin G. Ebrahim
- Babar Awan
- Hamid Khan
- Syed Ali Zafar
- Ashtar Ausaf Ali
- Khalid Ranjha
- Liaqat Ali Khan, barrister of Inner Temple
- Latif Khosa
- Muhammad Ali Jinnah, barrister of Lincoln's Inn
- Mumtaz Mustafa
- Mahmud Ali Kasuri
- Rana Mashood Ahmad Khan
- Rashid Rehman
- Shakil ur Rahman Khan
- Syed Sharifuddin Pirzada, barrister of Lincoln's Inn
- Sahibzada Ahmed Raza Khan Kasuri
- Wasim Sajjad
- Zulfikar Ali Bhutto, barrister of Lincoln's Inn
- Salman Aslam Butt
- Mansoor Usman Awan

== Politicians and government officers ==
- Fakir Syed Azizuddin, minister during Sikh rule
- Mumtaz Daultana, Punjabi politician
- Sir Shahnawaz Khan Mamdot, Muslim League leader and politician
- Sir Mian Muhammad Shafi, early politician from Punjab
- Begum Jahanara Shahnawaz, Muslim League lady activist
- Syed Amjad Ali, senior politician and former Finance Minister of Pakistan
- Qamar Zaman Kaira
- Moonis Elahi
- Chaudhry Tahir Mahmood Chahal Jatt
- Aitizaz Ahsan
- Hafiz Muhammad Saeed, amir of Jama'at-ud-Da'wah
- Imran Khan, former Prime Minister of Pakistan, chairman of Pakistan Tehreek-e-Insaf, former cricketer
- Khawaja Saad Rafique
- Maleeha Lodhi
- Malik Ghulam Muhammad, governor-general of Pakistan from 1951 until 1955
- Naeem Bokhari, Pakistani TV personality and a Senior Advocate of the Supreme Court
- Master Taj-uj-Din Ansari (leader of Majlis-e-Ahrar)
- Sheikh Hissam-ud-Din (leader of Majlis-e-Ahrar)
- Mazhar Ali Azhar (founder of Majlis-e-Ahrar-ul-Islam), Member of the Legislative Assembly
- Nawabzada Nasrullah Khan (Secretary General Majlis-e-Ahrar-e-Islam, 1945)
- Nawaz Sharif, former prime minister of Pakistan, leader of the Pakistan Muslim League (N)
- Princess Sarvath El Hassan (resident), Crown Princess of Jordan for over 30 years, wife of Prince Hassan bin Talal of Jordan
- Raza Rabbani
- Shahbaz Sharif
- Abdul Sattar Ranjoor, politician who lived briefly in Lahore
- Syed Mohammad Inaamullah, diplomat

== Saints ==
- Ali al-Hujwiri, patron Sufi saint of Lahore
- Mian Mir, Qadiri Sufi saint
- Madho Lal Hussain (Shah Hussain), Sufi poet
- Guru Ram Das, 4th Sikh Guru

== Scholars ==
- Gottlieb Wilhelm Leitner, Orientalist scholar and early educationalist of British Punjab
- Alfred Cooper Woolner, Sanskrit scholar
- John Lockwood Kipling curator, artist and ethnologist, also father of Rudyard Kipling
- Allama Mashriqi, mathematician, political theorist, Islamic scholar, founder of the Khaksar movement
- Alamgir Hashmi, English and Comparative Literature scholar, author, literary editor and scholarly editor (social sciences and humanities)
- Ayesha Jalal, South Asian Historian
- Ishtiaq Ahmed, professor emeritus of Political Science, Stockholm University and Senior Research Fellow at the Institute of South Asian Studies, Singapore, author of prize-winning The Punjab Bloodied, Partitioned and Cleansed
- Muhammad Sharif, Pakistani cosmologist
- Muhammad Tahir ul-Qadri, founder Minhaj-ul-Quran, religious Scholar, Islamic hadith compiler, Author
- Nergis Mavalvala, Pakistani-American astrophysicist, dean of Massachusetts Institute of Technology (MIT) School of Science
- Ikram Chughtai, Pakistani researcher and writer
- Israr Ahmed, Pakistani Muslim religious scholar, founder of the Tanzeem-e-Islami
- Javed Ahmad Ghamidi, Pakistani Muslim theologian, Koran scholar, educationist
- Sara Suleri, author, professor of English at Yale University since 1983
- Subrahmanyan Chandrasekhar, winner of Nobel Prize in Physics, astrophysicist
- Sarfraz Ahmed Naeemi, founder of Jamia Naeemia Lahore
- Syed Afzal Haider legal expert and scholar of Islamic jurisprudence
- Syed Waqar Jaffry Pakistani academic and researcher in the field of computer science and artificial intelligence
- Ghulam Ahmed Pervez, Pakistani Muslim theologian, Koran scholar, Talu-e-Islam
- Asghar Zaidi, vice chancellor of Government College University Lahore
- Jitendra Pal Singh Uberoi, sociologist and philosophical anthropologist

== Sportspersons ==
- Muhammad Ahmed, footballer
- Rehan Butt, hockey player
- The Great Gama
- Zubair Jhara, wrestler
- Zahid Shareef, hockey player
- Aisam-ul-Haq Qureshi, tennis player

=== Cricketers ===
- Aamer Sohail
- Abdul Hafeez Kardar, Pakistan's first official cricket captain
- Abdul Qadir
- Abdul Razzaq
- Abid Ali
- Adnan Akmal
- Ahmed Shehzad
- Ali Naqvi
- Anam Amin
- Asif Masood
- Ata-ur-Rehman
- Azhar Ali
- Babar Azam
- Bismah Maroof
- Fazal Mahmood
- Gul Mohammad
- Humayun Farhat
- Ijaz Ahmed
- Ikramullah Sheikh
- Imam-ul-Haq
- Imran Butt
- Imran Farhat
- Imran Khan
- Imtiaz Ahmed
- Kamran Akmal
- Khan Mohammad
- Mahmood Hussain
- Mohammad Hussain
- Mohammad Khalil
- Mohammad Yousuf
- Mudassar Nazar
- Nashra Sandhu
- Nasir Jamshed
- Saad Nasim
- Saad Bin Zafar
- Saleem Altaf
- Saleem Malik
- Salman Butt
- Sami Aslam
- Saqlain Mushtaq
- Sarfraz Nawaz
- Shafiq Ahmed
- Sidra Nawaz
- Taufeeq Umar
- Umer Akmal
- Usman Salahuddin
- Usman Qadir
- Wahab Riaz
- Waqar Hasan
- Wasim Akram
- Waqar Younis
- Zafar Gohar
- Zulqarnain Haider

== Royalty and nobility ==
This section includes figures born in or related to the Subah of Lahore or the Lahore Durbar;

- Jahangir, 4th Mughal Emperor buried in Tomb of Jahangir
- Anarkali, quasi-legendary Mughal concubine and aesthetic muse, after whom the Anarkali Bazaar is named
- Shah Jahan, 5th Mughal Emperor born in Lahore
- Nur Jahan, Mughal Empress buried in Tomb of Nur Jahan
- Ustad Ahmad Lahori, chief architect of Taj Mahal
- Shahbaz Khan Kamboh, leading general of Mughal emperor Akbar
- Wazir Khan, Subahdar of Lahore and Grand Wazir of Mughal Empire
- Sangam Rai, founder of Burdwan Raj zamindari estate in West Bengal
- Ranjit Singh, 1st Maharaja of Sikh Empire
- Kharak Singh, 2nd Maharaja of Sikh Empire
- Nau Nihal Singh, 3rd Maharaja of Sikh Empire
- Duleep Singh, 5th and last Maharaja of Sikh Empire
- Bamba Sutherland, last Sikh princess of the Punjab

== Writers and poets ==
- Patras Bokhari
- Abdul Hamid Lahori
- Abu al-Barakat Munir Lahori
- Masud Sa'd Salman
- Abu-al-Faraj Runi
- Hakim Ahmad Shuja, poet, dramatist, writer and scholar
- Chaudhry Afzal Haq, writer, politician, historian, novelist
- Abdul Hameed, Urdu fiction writer
- Agha Shorish Kashmiri, writer, historian
- Muhammad Asim Butt, Urdu novelist, short story writer, translator, researcher, editor, critic and journalist
- Janbaz Mirza, writer, historian
- Wasif Ali Wasif, conversationalist, writer, Sufi figure
- Amjad Islam Amjad writer, poet and teacher
- Amrita Pritam, woman Punjabi poet, novelist, and essayist
- Ashfaq Ahmed, writer, playwright, broadcaster
- Shahbaz Malik, writer, broadcaster, bibliographer
- Bapsi Sidhwa, novelist in English, author of Cracking India, The Crow Eaters, Ice Candy Man and Water
- Bano Qudsia, novelist, playwright and spiritualist
- Daniyal Mueenuddin
- Enver Sajjad
- Muzaffar Warsi, Urdu poet
- Faiz Ahmed Faiz, poet in Urdu, Lenin Peace Prize recipient
- Habib Jalib
- Imtiaz Dharker
- Jawayd Anwar
- Khalil-ur-Rehman Qamar
- Krishan Chander
- Masud Sa'd Salman, Persian poet from the Ghaznavid period
- Moeen Nizami, Urdu and Persian writer, poet, and scholar
- Moniza Alvi
- Mohsin Hamid
- Muneer Niazi
- Qasim Mahmood
- Muhammad Iqbal, philosopher, politician, poet
- Rudyard Kipling, English short-story writer, poet, novelist (resided in Lahore)
- Alamgir Hashmi, English poet, essayist, fiction writer (born in Lahore)
- Saadat Hasan Manto, short story writer in Urdu
- Qayyum Nazar, Urdu-language poet
- Khadija Mastoor, Urdu feminist writer
- Hajra Masroor, Urdu feminist writer
- Ali Arshad Mir, Punjabi poet and writer
- Vijay Kumar Chopra, writer
- Tariq Ali, British-Pakistani writer and communist
- Tahir Aslam Gora, Canadian-Pakistani writer, poet, novelist, broadcaster
- Syed Salman Gilani

== Aviators ==
- Ravish Malhotra, an air commodore of the Indian Air Force, who was also trained for spaceflight in the Soviet Union

== Outlaws ==
- Jagga Gujjar, 20th-century Lahore bandit

== Others ==
- Kamran Lashari
- Ayesha Mumtaz, PCS officer
- Tahira Mazhar Ali, women's rights and political activist
- Pappu Samrat, choreographer
- Yousuf Salahuddin, socialite, philanthropist, ex-politician
- Laeeq Ahmed, commentator, broadcaster, television presenter
