= Malik Mohammad Qayyum =

Pakistani politician (1944–2023)

Attorney General of Pakistan
- In office 2007–2008
- Preceded by: Makhdoom Ali Khan
- Succeeded by: Latif Khosa

Personal details
- Born: 18 January 1944 Lahore, Punjab Province, British India
- Died: 17 February 2023 (aged 79) Lahore, Punjab, Pakistan
- Relations: Muhammad Pervaiz Malik (brother); Mian Javed Akram (brother); Yasmin Rehman (sister); Ali Pervaiz Malik (nephew)

Supreme Court of Pakistan

Malik Mohammad Qayyum (Urdu: ملک محمد قیوم; 18 January 1944 – 17 February 2023) was a Pakistani lawyer who was Senior Advocate Supreme Court and Attorney General of Pakistan. He was replaced by Senator Latif Khosa when President Pervez Musharraf resigned on 18 August 2008. He became Attorney General following the resignation of Makhdoom Ali Khan. He was a judge of the Lahore High Court, a position he resigned from after a recording of an alleged phone call surfaced in which he was alleged to be approached by the then Prime Minister Nawaz Sharif's government to fix judgement in a case before him involving Benazir Bhutto. Qayyum denied that the voice in the telephone conversation was his. Agencies have examined the tapes and have expressed their concern that they could have been doctored although no final verdict is available.

Qayyum was a senior lawyer of the Supreme Court of Pakistan and advised the sitting benches of the Higher Judiciary on constitutional issues. He was responsible for conducting the inquiry into match fixing which was lauded by the International Cricket Council known as the "Qayyum Report".

Qayyum was the son of Justice Malik Muhammad Akram Arain and brother of Mian Javed Akram (PIMS) and late former Minister for Commerce Muhammad Pervaiz Malik. His elder son Ahmad Qayyum is also a Barrister, once he paid tribute to Mr. Ijaz Hussain Batalvi while saying to Akhtar Aly Kureshy Advocate, legacy follower of Ijaz Batalvi, Ahmad has to join Batalvi office if alive.

Qayyum died on 17 February 2023 in Lahore, at the age of 79. He was buried in the Miani Sahib graveyard.

== Judicial career ==
Qayyum was the subject of controversy as a judge of the Lahore High Court. During Prime Minister Nawaz Sharif's recommend term in office (1997–99), the then Chief of Ehtesab [Accountability] Cell, Saif ur Rehman, filed cases against members of the Pakistan Peoples Party [PPP], including high-profile cases of alleged corruption by former premier Benazir Bhutto and her husband Asif Ali Zardari, before Qayyum. Qayyum rejected pre-arrest bails, terminated temporary injunctions, and granted permissions of FIRs against PPP-connected persons and senior officers.

Qayyum was a nominated judge on Ehtesab Bench of the Lahore High Court. The PPP said Qayyum (whose brother Pervaiz Malik; a sitting MNA from PM Sharif's Pakistan Muslim League-N at that time) was biased. Malik was given an unopposed seat of the National Assembly vacated by the Prime Minister from Lahore.

Qayyum also said that the 2008 Pakistani general election was going to be rigged. On 10 March 2008 he rejected a plan by opposition lawmakers to reinstate the country's ousted Supreme Court justices within 30 days of parliament's first session, on the grounds that President Musharraf's dismissal of the judges was legal under the constitution.

== See also ==
- Lahore High Court
- Attorney General for Pakistan
- Lahore High Court Bar Association
- Muhammad Pervaiz Malik
- Shaista Pervaiz

Political offices
Preceded by Makhdoom Ali Khan	Attorney General of Pakistan; 2007–2008	Succeeded by Latif Khosa
