= Waseem Qadir =

Member of the National Assembly of Pakistan from Lahore (2024–2029)

- وسیم قادر

Member of the National Assembly of Pakistan
- Incumbent
- Assumed office 29 February 2024
- Constituency: NA-121 Lahore-V

Member of the Provincial Assembly of the Punjab
- In office 9 April 2008 – 20 March 2013
- Constituency: PP-144 Lahore-VIII

Personal details
- Party: IPP (2026-present)
- Other political affiliations: PMLN (2008-2018; 2024-2026); PTI (2018-2024)

Chaudhary Waseem Qadir (Urdu: چوہدری وسیم قادر) is a Pakistani politician who has been a member of the National Assembly of Pakistan since February 2024. He had also been a member of the Provincial Assembly of the Punjab from April 2008 to March 2013.

== Political career ==
Qadir was elected to the Provincial Assembly of the Punjab in the 2008 Punjab provincial election from PP-144 Lahore-VIII as a candidate of Pakistan Muslim League (N) (PML(N)). He received 34,963 votes and defeated Zahid Zulfiqar Khan, a candidate of Pakistan People's Party (PPP).

He served as one of Lahore's nine deputy mayors from 2017 to 2021.

He left the PML(N) after he exchanged harsh words with Hamza Shahbaz over the party nomination of a vacant councillor seat.

He was elected to the National Assembly of Pakistan in the 2024 Pakistani general election from NA-121 Lahore-V as an independent candidate supported by Pakistan Tehreek-e-Insaf (PTI). He received 78,707 votes while runner up Shaikh Rohale Asghar of PML(N) received 70,598 votes. He re-joined PML(N) after winning the election.
