= Muhammad Pervaiz Malik =

Pakistani politician (1948–2021)

- محمد پرویز ملک
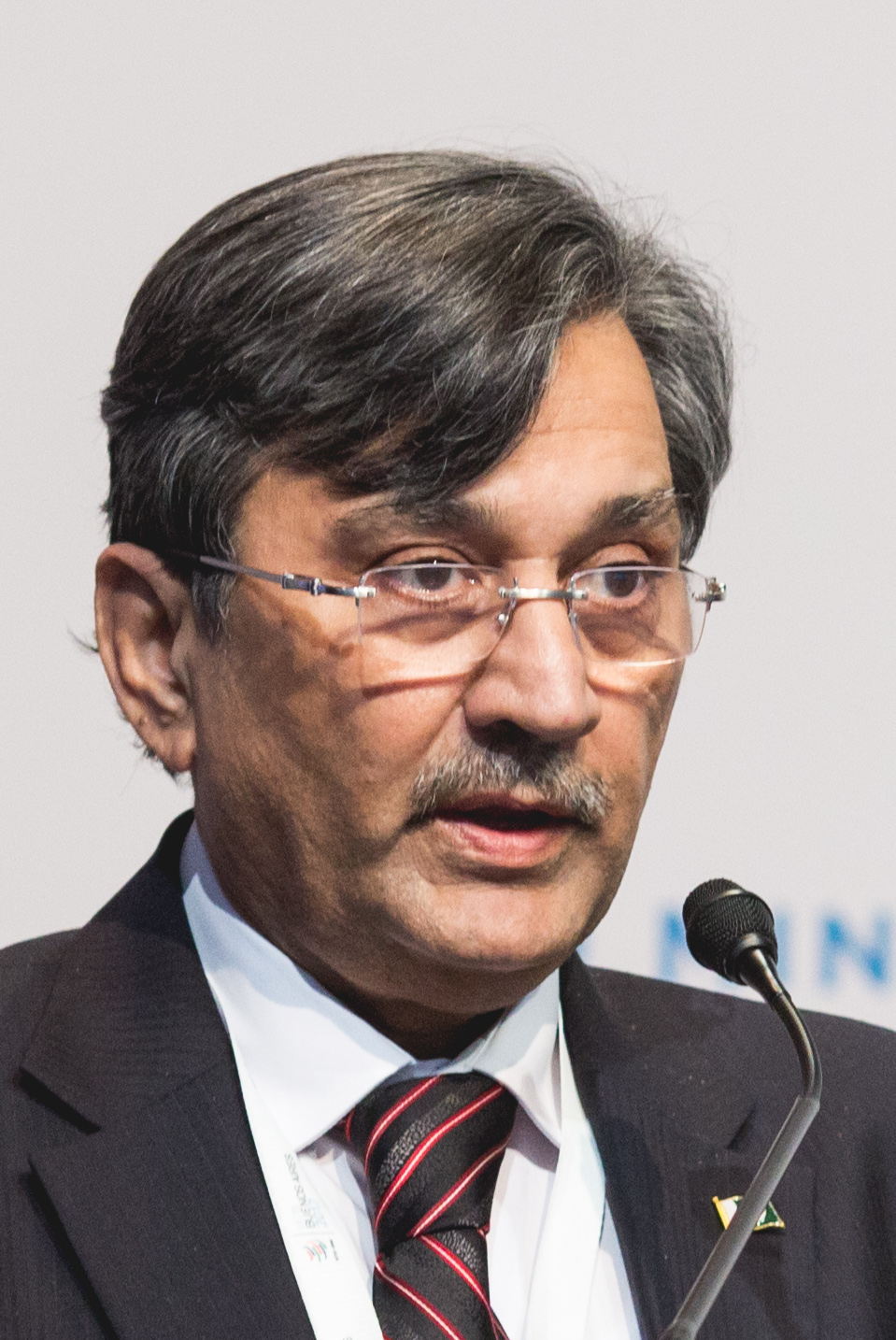
- Malik in 2017

Minister for Commerce and Textile
- In office 4 August 2017 – 31 May 2018
- President: Mamnoon Hussain
- Prime Minister: Shahid Khaqan Abbasi
- Preceded by: Khurram Dastgir Khan
- Succeeded by: Shamshad Akhtar

Member of the National Assembly of Pakistan
- In office 13 August 2018 – 11 October 2021
- Succeeded by: Shaista Pervaiz
- Constituency: NA-133 (Lahore-XI)
- In office 1 June 2013 – 31 May 2018
- Constituency: NA-123 (Lahore-VI)
- In office 11 March 2010 – 16 March 2013
- Constituency: NA-123 (Lahore-VI)
- In office 16 November 2002 – 15 November 2007
- Constituency: NA-120 (Lahore-III)
- In office 15 February 1997 – 12 October 1999
- Constituency: NA-95 (Lahore-IV)

Personal details
- Born: 18 November 1948 Lahore, Punjab, Dominion of Pakistan
- Died: 11 October 2021 (aged 72) Lahore, Pakistan
- Resting place: Miani Sahib Graveyard, Lahore, Pakistan
- Party: Pakistan Muslim League (N)
- Spouse: Shaista Pervaiz (wife)
- Relations: Malik Mohammad Qayyum (brother); Yasmeen Rehman (sister)
- Children: Ali Pervaiz Malik (son)

Muhammad Pervaiz Malik (Urdu: محمد پرویز ملک; 18 November 1948 – 11 October 2021) was a Pakistani politician who had been a member of the National Assembly of Pakistan since 13 August 2018 until his death in 2021. Previously, he was a member of the National Assembly between 1997 and May 2018. He served as Minister for Commerce and Textile, in Abbasi Cabinet from August 2017 to May 2018.

== Early life and education ==
Malik was born on 18 November 1947 in Lahore to Malik Muhammad Akram Arain.

He earned a B. Sc. Honours in Engineering from Aston University.

== Political career ==
Malik was elected to the National Assembly of Pakistan as a candidate of Pakistan Muslim League (N) (PML-N) from Constituency NA-95 (Lahore) in the 1997 Pakistani general election.

He was re-elected to the National Assembly as a candidate of PML-N from Constituency NA-120 (Lahore-III) in the 2002 Pakistani general election. He received 33,741 votes and defeated Altaf Ahmad Qureshi, a candidate of Pakistan Peoples Party (PPP).

He was re-elected to the National Assembly as a candidate of PML-N from Constituency NA-123 (Lahore-VI) in a by-election held in 2010. He received 37,787 votes and defeated Mian Hamid Miraj, a candidate of Pakistan Tehreek-e-Insaf (PTI). The seat became vacant after Javed Hashmi who won the seat in 2008 Pakistani general election, vacated it to retain his home seat in Multan.

He was re-elected to the National Assembly as a candidate of PML-N from Constituency NA-123 (Lahore-VI) in the 2013 Pakistani general election. He received 126,878 votes and defeated Atif Choudhry, a candidate of PTI.

Following the election of Shahid Khaqan Abbasi as Prime Minister of Pakistan in August 2017, Malik was inducted into the federal cabinet of Abbasi and was appointed Minister for Commerce for the first time. Upon the dissolution of the National Assembly on the expiration of its term on 31 May 2018, Malik ceased to hold the office as Federal Minister for Commerce and Textile.

He was re-elected to the National Assembly as a candidate of PML-N from Constituency NA-133 (Lahore-XI) in the 2018 Pakistani general election.

== Family ==
Malik's sister Yasmeen Rehman was a member of the National Assembly of Pakistan. He was a younger brother of Malik Mohammad Qayyum who was Attorney General of Pakistan.

== Death ==
On 11 October 2021, Muhammad Pervaiz Malik had a sudden cardiac arrest and was brought to the Akram Medical Complex but did not survive. His son, Ali Pervaiz Malik, and Dr Javed Akram, former VC University of Health Sciences, confirmed the death in the evening. He was 72 years old.

== See also ==
- Malik Mohammad Qayyum
- Ali Pervaiz Malik
