= Yasmin Rehman =

Pakistani politician

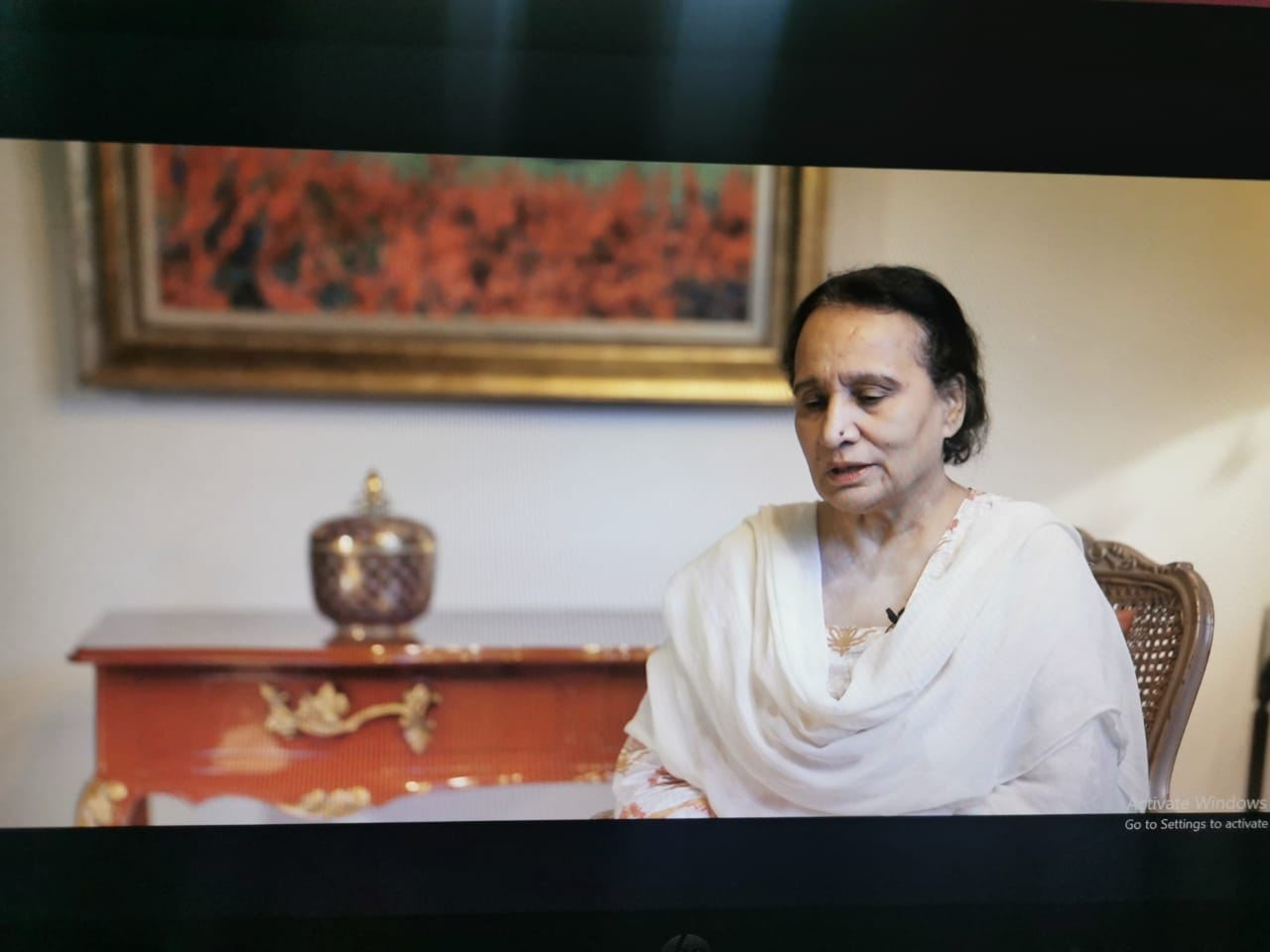
- portrait in 2011

Member of the National Assembly of Pakistan
- In office 16 November 2002 – 15 November 2007
- Constituency: Reserved seat for women
- In office 17 March 2008 – 16 March 2013
- Constituency: Reserved seat for women

Personal details
- Party: Pakistan Peoples Party
- Spouse: Mian Misbah-ur-Rehman
- Relations: Muhammad Pervaiz Malik (brother); Malik Mohammad Qayyum (brother); Professor Dr. Javed Akram (brother); Ali Pervaiz Malik (nephew); Mian Mujtaba Shuja-ur-Rehman (nephew)

Yasmeen Rehman (Urdu: یاسمین رحمان) is a Pakistani politician who served as member of the National Assembly of Pakistan.

== Personal life ==
She is daughter of Retired Justice of Supreme Court of Pakistan Justice (R) Malik Muhammad Akram Arain. She did her Bachelor of Arts (BA) with distinction in Philosophy from Kinnaird College For Women, Lahore. She was then selected by Chevening Scholarship after her tenure as a Member National Assembly to attend a Masters course at University College London.

== Family Life ==
She is sister of Muhammad Pervaiz Malik, Malik Mohammad Qayyum, and Professor Dr. Javed Akram Arain.

She is married to Mian Misbah-ur-Rehman. Her nephew Mian Mujtaba Shuja-ur-Rehman has been member of Provincial Assembly of Pakistan from Lahore many times. Her nephew Ali Pervaiz Malik has also been a member of the National Assembly of Pakistan.

== Political career ==
She was elected to the National Assembly of Pakistan as a candidate of Pakistan Peoples Party on a seat reserved for women from Punjab in the 2002 Pakistani general election.

She was re-elected to the National Assembly of Pakistan as a candidate of Pakistan Peoples Party on a seat reserved for women from Punjab in the 2008 Pakistani general election.

She was appointed Advisor for "Ministry of Women Development" with status of State Minister from April, 2010 to June, 2011. She was Advisor to the Minister for Women Development which during that tenure was the Honorable Prime Minister of Pakistan. Ministry of Women Development was developed under the 18th Constitutional Amendment.

She has performed her duties as acting speaker of National Assembly of Pakistan on numerous times, presiding over many sessions of the National Assembly. She was also the acting Speaker of the house for the close out final session of the 13th National Assembly on March 14, 2013.

She is former founding Board member of Organization of Women in Parliamentary Politics, which is the first ever civil society organization for women parliamentarians in Pakistan. She has been the Chairperson the board of directors of Furniture Pakistan from 2010 to 2011, which was under the Ministry of Production, Government of Pakistan.

She was member of Special Parliamentary Committee on Sectarian Violence in Quetta City (February 2013) constituted by the Honorable Raja Pervez Ashraf, Prime Mistier of Pakistan.

=== Standing Committees of National Assembly ===
She was a member of the following Standing Committees of National Assembly from 2008-2013:

1. Public Accounts Committee (PAC)
2. Health Committee
3. Commerce Committee
4. Human Rights Committee
5. Environment Committee

During her tenure as Member of National Assembly, she was an active member of Public Accounts Committee of the National Assembly. She was the Deputy Chairperson of the Public Accounts Committee, Regular Chairperson of Special Committee for "Monitoring and Implementation Committee" of the PAC and has been acting Chair of the Public Accounts Committee on multiple occasions from 2008-2013.

=== Bills and Motions moved during tenure in National Assembly ===
She was Instrumental in Passing of “Right to free and Compulsory Education Bill 2012” in National Assembly which was moved and piloted by her as a Private Member Bill.

The Capital University Islamabad Bill, 2013 moved and authored by her was also passed by the National Assembly.

== Publications ==
She has written a book on the details of the 18th Amendment and its affects on the 1973 Constitution of Pakistan. The Book is titled "The Constitution of the Islamic Republic Pakistan, 1973 (As amended by Eighteenth Amendment Act, 2010)" written by Yasmeen Rehman. Lahore, Published by Punjab Law Book House in 2010.
