= Fatima Ali =

Pakistani-American chef (1989–2019)

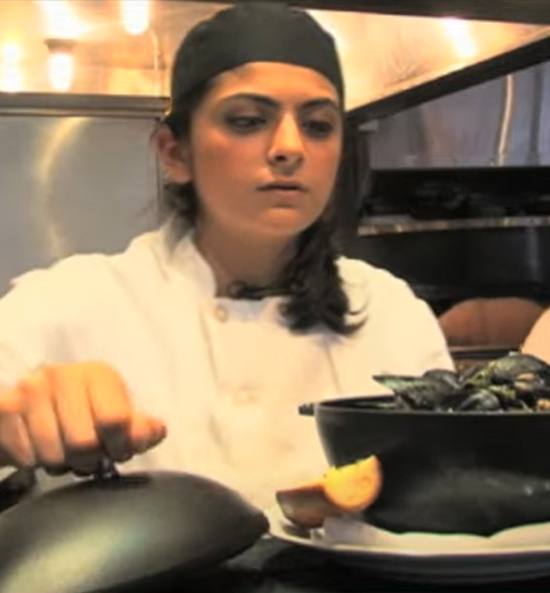
- Ali in December 2012, as assistant chef at Café Centro
- Born: August 8, 1989; Lahore, Punjab, Pakistan
- Died: January 25, 2019 (aged 29); San Marino, California, U.S.
- Occupations: Chef, restaurateur, television personality
- Known for: Chef Executive at Stella 34 Tratoria and La Fonda Del Sol; Winner of episode of TV series Chopped; Top Chef: Colorado
- Family: Ashtar Ausaf Ali (father)

Fatima Ali (August 8, 1989 – January 25, 2019) was a Pakistani-American executive chef, restaurateur and television personality. She was known for her successful appearances on reality cooking shows Chopped and Top Chef, and for posthumously winning two James Beard Foundation Awards for her writing.

== Early life ==
Fatima Ali was born and raised in Pakistan, dividing her time between Karachi and Lahore. She was educated at the Karachi Grammar School. Ali was the daughter of educator Farazeh Durrani and lawyer Ashtar Ausaf Ali, the Attorney General for Pakistan from 2016 to 2018 and again from 2022 to 2023. She learned to cook from her father, her grandmother, and her family's cook, Qadir. She immigrated to America at age 18 to attend the Culinary Institute of America, graduating in 2011.

== Career ==
Ali began her culinary career as a junior sous chef at Café Centro in New York City. In 2012, she won an episode of Chopped (Season 12, episode 2, "A Guts Reaction") on the Food Network. She continued her career in New York City, becoming the youngest executive sous chef at Stella 34 Trattoria at Macy's Herald Square, and then the executive sous chef at La Fonda del Sol.

In 2017, Ali was a contestant on Top Chef: Colorado. Although she finished in seventh place, she was voted the fan favorite.

== Illness and death ==
After competing on Top Chef, Ali was diagnosed with Ewing's sarcoma and underwent surgery at Memorial Sloan Kettering Cancer Center in January 2018. After undergoing chemotherapy, she was initially declared cancer-free, and in April 2018, she cooked in public at the Pebble Beach Food and Wine Festival. However, in October 2018, in a personal essay published by Bon Appétit titled I’m a Chef with Terminal Cancer. This Is What I’m Doing with the Time I Have Left, Ali reported that her cancer had returned and become terminal. She died at her family's home in San Marino, California, on January 25, 2019, at the age of 29.

She was buried in Lahore in February 2019. In April 2019, Ali was posthumously awarded a James Beard Foundation Award for her essay. Her memoir, Savor: A Chef's Hunger for More, published in October 2022 and co-authored with Tarajia Morrell, received a James Beard Foundation Award in June 2023.
