= Makhdoom Ali Khan =

Pakistani lawyer (born 1954)

Barrister Makhdoom Ali Khan
- مخدوم علی خان

Attorney General for Pakistan
- In office September 2001 – August 2007
- Preceded by: Aziz A. Munshi
- Succeeded by: Malik Mohammad Qayyum

Chairman Pakistan Bar Council
- In office 2001–2007
- Preceded by: Aziz A. Munshi
- Succeeded by: Malik Mohammad Qayyum

Member chairman's Panel of Arbitrators International Centre for Settlement of Investment Disputes
- Incumbent
- Assumed office 2011

Member London Court of International Arbitration
- In office 2008–2013

Personal details
- Born: 9 January 1954 (age 72) Karachi, Pakistan
- Education: University of Karachi (MA International Relations); S. M. Law College (LL.B); Corpus Christi College, Cambridge(BA in Law); London School of Economics(LLM (Maritime and Public International Law)); Inns of Court School of Law(BVC)
- Occupation: Lawyer
- Profession: Barrister
- Website: www.fazleghani.com

Supreme Court of Pakistan

Makhdoom Ali Khan (Urdu: مخدوم علی خان; born 9 January 1954) is a Pakistani lawyer who is a senior advocate of the Supreme Court of Pakistan. Khan has held several positions, including Attorney General for Pakistan, chairman of the Pakistan Bar Council, member of the Law and Justice Commission of Pakistan, board member of the Federal Judicial Academy and of the Sindh Judicial Academy.

He is a serving Member on the Governing Board of the British Pakistan Law Council, an Officer of the Board of the Forum for International Conciliation and Arbitration (FICACIC), a member of the Board of Trustees of the Dubai International Arbitration Centre, a member of the Advisory Board of the Citizens Police Liaison Committee (CPLC), a former member of the court of the London Court of International Arbitration and a member of the International Centre for Settlement of Investment Dispute's (ICSID) Chairman's Panel of Arbitrators. He has consistently been ranked amongst the top three litigators in Pakistan over the last three decades both by reputation and in international rankings in legal publications and amongst the top two litigators in the Sindh High Court in Karachi.

== Education ==
Khan attended University of Karachi (MA international relations – first with distinction in international law) and S. M. Law College (LL.B – first class) in Karachi. He was admitted to Corpus Christi College, Cambridge where he completed his BA in law (first class) in 1977 and then went on to do an LLM (maritime and public international law) at the London School of Economics and political science in 1978. He was called to the bar at Lincoln's Inn in 1979 where he was a Hardwicke Scholar and topped in constitutional law and law of international trade.

== Career ==
After a short stint teaching constitutional law and public international law at Keele University in the United Kingdom he returned to Karachi, Pakistan, and joined the offices of Syed Sharifuddin Pirzada (former Attorney General Pakistan and current Ambassador at Large), who was Attorney General at the time, and worked there for two years. He then joined the chambers of his father Fazle Ghani Khan (Retd. Justice of High Court of West Pakistan and Member Balochistan Law Reform Commission) where he practised law till he was appointed Attorney General for Pakistan in September 2001 making him the second youngest Attorney General in the history of Pakistan. He was also invited by the Supreme Court of Pakistan to sign the roll of Senior Advocates of the Supreme Court of Pakistan in 2001 making him the second youngest lawyer to do so in the history of Pakistan. He was also an examiner and lecturer at S.M. Law College till 1986. During his early years at Fazle Ghani Khan and Co. Advocates he wrote columns for Dawn, Herald, Newsline and the now defunct Viewpoint magazine as well as travelling to and writing reports on judicial independence in Malayasia and the situation in Myanmar for the International Commission of Jurists along with speaking at many international law seminars. Khan rose to the forefront of the profession at a remarkably young age which is evidenced by the fact that all the top litigators in Pakistan are at least a decade senior to him and was an Advocate Supreme Court in 1989 at the age of 35. It was in this year that he was given the honour normally only bestowed upon the senior most litigators in the country to appear as amicus curiae by then Chief Justice of the Sindh High Court Ajmal Mian (who later became a Judge of the Supreme Court of Pakistan and finally the Chief Justice of Pakistan) in a suo moto reference on the subject of inhuman jail conditions in Karachi along with later Chief Justice of the Sindh High Court Sabihuddin Ahmad. Makhdoom Ali Khan appeared for Akbar Bugti when the Provincial Assembly of Balochistan was dismissed and became the first lawyer in the country to successfully argue and secure the restoration of a dissolved legislature. Later he appeared for President Ghulam Ishaq Khan and President Farooq Leghari in the Supreme Court in dissolution cases. In 1999 he argued a constitutional petition successfully against the Government of Pakistan on behalf of Jang Group before the Supreme Court of Pakistan.

He came to the notice of the Pakistan Government after he successfully negotiated with the military regime and the newly constituted National Accountability Bureau for the release of his incarcerated client Sultan Lakhani. He also argued a number of high-profile commercial cases. He and Abdul Hafiz Pirzada were counsel for National Power and the Hub Power Company – before the High Courts and the Supreme Court of Pakistan – when the Nawaz Sharif and later the Pervez Musharraf governments reneged on the contracts executed between the Federation of Pakistan and these companies. Khan was also retained by these corporations to represent them with Johnny Veeder QC and Toby Landau QC before an ICC tribunal.

During his term as Attorney General he represented the Government of Pakistan successfully with Jan Paulsson, Johnny Veeder QC and Christopher Greenwood QC in the SGS, Bayinder and Impregilo cases before ICSID arbitral tribunals. A directive was also issued by President Pervez Musharraf at around this time that no Bilateral Investment Treaty by any Government department or ministry was to be signed unless Mr. Khan was consulted. He also tirelessly advocated the adoption of the UNCITRAL Model Law for Pakistan. He authored the Recognition and Enforcement (Arbitration Agreements and Foreign Arbitral Awards) Ordinance, 2005, which incorporated the New York Convention in the municipal laws of Pakistan and the Arbitration (International Investment Disputes) Ordinance, 2007 to implement the International Convention on the Settlement of Investment Disputes between States and Nationals of other States.

As Attorney General he successfully represented the GoP to overturn through a review petition the judgement of the Supreme Court which had declared bank interest to be unIslamic. He also successfully argued before the Supreme Court that an adult Muslim woman can marry without the consent of a wali (male guardian), persuaded the court as amicus curaie to restrain the Government from raising constructions in the Murree and Margalla Hills areas which were a threat to the environment and to suspend the operation of a judgement of the High Court which had declared as unconstitutional the Juvenile Justice System Ordinance – a law which had set up special courts for juveniles. Khan advised President Musharraf to seek advisory opinion from the Supreme Court when the government of the religious parties sought to set up a moral police (Hasba bill) in the North West Frontier Province. His argument that the proposed legislation was unconstitutional succeeded and the Governor NWFP was restrained from signing into law the Bill passed by the Frontier Assembly. He also successfully represented the government in a large number of tax and commercial cases. Khan advised Pakistan on all public international law and international arbitration issues which included the disputed issue with India on the construction of Baghliar Dam and the Kishenganga Water dispute. He was on Court Notice in the Pakistan Steel Mills Case in the Supreme Court of Pakistan and the Reference of the Chief Justice of Pakistan in both the Supreme Judicial Council of Pakistan and the Supreme Court. He advised the Government of Pakistan in the Mukhtaran Mai case to support her stand and later appeared in the Supreme Court to argue in her support which resulted in the Supreme Court admitting her petition and issuing orders for the arrest of the alleged rapists.

He was also head of Pakistan's delegation to the United Nations General Assembly in 2004 (Agenda Item: Measures to Eliminate International Terrorism).

Makhdoom Ali Khan was part of the three member Constitution Committee (along with former Law Minister Zahid Hamid and former Judge of the Supreme Court, Retd. Justice Bhandari) that drafted the Pakistan Cricket Board's current constitution.

He is known to be one of the four chief architects behind the Women's Protection Bill; the other three being Haziqul Khairi, Javed Ahmad Ghamidi and Muhammad Khalid Masud, the passing of which was facilitated by the complete support of Pervez Musharraf and the whole-hearted backing of the MQM and the Pakistan Peoples Party in the National Assembly. Though the PML-Q opposed it initially and created hurdles to it becoming law they later reluctantly supported it after some of its provisions were diluted to their liking to appease some conservative Islamic scholars who were against the bill completely. This prompted the resignation of Javed Ahmad Ghamidi from the Council of Islamic Ideology in September 2006 though it was not accepted by the President. Makhdoom Ali Khan, along with Haziqul Khairi, is reported to have personally drafted the bill. His term as Attorney General also saw some extremely competent and successful lawyers appointed to the Sindh High Court and Lahore High Court bench which was a deviation from the norm in the past. Almost all those appointed on his recommendations to the High Courts and the Supreme Court were sacked when General Pervez Musharraf imposed emergency on 3 November 2007.

He resigned from the office of Attorney General (and thus also the ex officio Chairman of the Pakistan Bar Council) on 20 July 2007, citing as his reasons that his legal advice was consistently ignored and that the Reference was a huge failure for the GoP and stated that it was disappointing that the concerned authorities were all placing the blame on others rather than accepting responsibility, making him the third longest serving Attorney General in the history of Pakistan. It was reported in Jang and The News newspapers that the President was reluctant to accept his resignation but eventually accepted it after eight days when Khan refused to take back his decision.

After his resignation he returned to private practice at Fazle Ghani Advocates where his practice predominantly consists of commercial litigation and arbitration, taxation, company/banking and constitutional litigation along with some appellate criminal litigation. He is known to be a specialist in taxation, corporate-commercial litigation and arbitration, constitutional and international law matters. Though he declined to advise the Government of Pakistan in politico-legal matters and also declined to appear for the President in the petitions challenging his election to office he continues to be retained by government departments in commercial and arbitration cases. Fazle Ghani Advocates' Karachi chambers are reputed to house the largest private law library in Pakistan. Khan has also written an authoritative commentary on the Constitution of Pakistan found in most law offices and chambers in Pakistan [ The Constitution of the Islamic Republic of Pakistan, 1973: with Political parties Act, 1962, Political parties rules, 1986, election commission notification for registration of political parties, 1986: as amended up to March 1988 (edited & introduced by Makhdoom Ali Khan, Karachi: Pakistan Law House, 1988)] as well as a tract on the impediments to provincial autonomy in Pakistan with Shahid Kardar. Dawn and Jang Group both printed stories claiming Mr. Khan was responsible for drafting the Provisional Constitutional Order (PCO) after the imposition of emergency in Pakistan. (The fact that he never speaks to the media was also highlighted in one of these articles which was also brought to notice during the media frenzy of the CJ's Reference 2007 and which is in stark contrast to the current holder of the office of Attorney General.) However, sources close to him denied this and after further investigation both newspapers printed corrections and Jang Group also printed an apology on 15 November 2007 stating he is 'one of the most respected barristers in the country' and that he had resigned from the office of Attorney General during the judicial crisis 'on a matter of principle'.

After returning to private practice he appeared in many important commercial cases for Pakistan International Airlines, Pakistan Petroleum Limited, PTCL, Jang Group of Newspapers, Reckitt Benckiser, OMV, BHP Billiton, Petronas, MacDonald's, Citibank, Unilever, Occidental Petroleum, British Petroleum, the Securities and Exchange Commission of Pakistan, the Oil and Gas Regulatory Authority, Oil and Gas Development Company limited, Habib Bank Limited, Cinepax, Royal Palm Golf & Country Club, The Colony Group, IGI Insurance, The Hub Power Company Ltd., Government of Sindh, Ericsson Pakistan (Pvt.) Ltd, Engro Fertilizers, General Electric, Huawei Technologies, MCB Bank Ltd, Exide Pakistan Limited, Honda Atlas Motors, Indus Motors, Gatron-Novatex, Geo Television Network, Mobilink, Telenor, Roche Pakistan Limited, Attock Oil and Pakistan Oil Fields amongst other clients in the Sindh High Court, Islamabad High Court, Lahore High Court and the Supreme Court of Pakistan. He is also sitting as an arbitrator in a number of important commercial matters both internationally and in Pakistan. His predominant place of practice is the Sindh High Court in Karachi, however, he also frequently appears for clients in the Islamabad High Court and the Supreme Court of Pakistan and his firm Fazleghani Advocates has offices in both Karachi and Islamabad.

In 2008 Makhdoom Ali Khan was part of an international team engaged by the Ministry of Religious Affairs, Government of Pakistan to challenge an arbitral award against it in the Commercial Court of the High Court of Justice, Queen's Bench Division in the United Kingdom. The decision was in their favour with $70 million damages awarded to the Ministry of Religious Affairs, Government of Pakistan. He has also appeared in all of the major cases involving the appointment of judges to the High Courts and Supreme Court of Pakistan since 2011. His view has remained consistent in all the cases he has argued on the issue; that the role of the Judicial Commission in determining the legal ability and fitness of a candidate being considered for appointment as a Judge of a High Court or Supreme Court of Pakistan is supreme, not open to review or appeal by other constitutional body, forum or functionary and is not justiciable.

== Official posts held ==
- Attorney General, Pakistan: 2001–2007
- Chairman, Pakistan Bar Council: 2001–2007
- Member, Law and Justice Commission of Pakistan: 2001–2007
- board member, Federal Judicial Academy of Pakistan: 2001–2007
- board member, Sindh Judicial Academy
- Member, London Court of International Arbitration: 2008–2013
- Member chairman's Panel of Arbitrators, International Centre for Settlement of Investment Disputes: 2011–present

== Official posts declined ==
- Judge, Sindh High Court: 1996 & 1997
- Judge, Supreme Court of Pakistan: 1999
- Advocate General Sindh: 2000
- Judge, Supreme Court of Pakistan: 2007
- Minister for Law, Justice & Parliamentary Affairs (Caretaker): 2007

Political offices
Preceded by Aziz A Munshi	Attorney General of Pakistan; September 2001 – August 2007	Succeeded by Malik Mohammad Qayyum
Preceded by	Chairman, Pakistan Bar Council; 2001–2007	Succeeded by

== See also ==
- Makhdoom
- Supreme Court Bar Association of Pakistan
- Pakistan Bar Council
- Attorney General for Pakistan
