= Khalid Jawed Khan =

Pakistani politician

35th Attorney-General for Pakistan
- In office 21 February 2020 – 10 April 2022
- President: Arif Alvi
- Prime Minister: Imran Khan
- Preceded by: Anwar Mansoor Khan
- Succeeded by: Ashtar Ausaf Ali

Personal details
- Born: Karachi
- Parent(s): Professor ND Khan, Mrs. Shamim N D. Khan
- Occupation: Lawyer
- Website: https://kjkadvocates.com/

The Supreme Court Building where office of Attorney General for Pakistan is situated

Khalid Jawed Khan (Urdu: خالد جاوید خان) is a Pakistani lawyer who served as the 35th Attorney General of Pakistan. Khan is a Barrister at Law and Advocate of Supreme Court and has been practicing law since 1996. He specializes in Constitutional Law, Taxation, Service and Civil matters.

== Education ==
Khan got his L.L.B degree from Queen Mary, University of London, his B.C.L. (Bachelor of Civil Law from Hertford College, Oxford University, and his L.L.M from Harvard Law School. He was also called to Bar at Lincoln's Inn, London.

Legal offices
Preceded by Anwar Mansoor Khan	Attorney-General for Pakistan; February 2020-April 2022	Succeeded by Ashtar Ausaf Ali
