= NA-127 Lahore-XI =

Constituency of the National Assembly of Pakistan

- Constituency for the National Assembly of Pakistan
- Region: Lahore City area of Lahore District
- Electorate: 527,044

Current constituency
- Party: Pakistan Muslim League (N)
- Member: Attaullah Tarar
- Created from: NA-127 Lahore-X

NA-127 Lahore-XI (این اے-127, لاہور-11) is a constituency for the National Assembly of Pakistan. NA-127 covers the areas of Liaqatabad, Model Town Ext (Q, R and S blocks), Pindi Rajputan, Ismail Nagar, Kot Lakhpat, Chungi Amar Sadhu, Teharta Pind, Bagrian, Green Town, Township, Maryam Colony, Sitara Colony, Wafaqi Colony and Farid Colony.

== Members of Parliament ==
=== 2021–2022: NA-133 Lahore-XI ===
Election	Member	Party
2018	Muhammad Pervaiz Malik	PML (N)
By-election 2021	Shaista Pervaiz	PML (N)

=== 2024–present: NA-127 Lahore-XI ===
Election	Member	Party
2024	Attaullah Tarar	PML (N)

== Election 2002 ==
General election 2002: NA-127 Lahore-X
Party	Candidate	Votes	%	±%
PAT	Dr. Muhammad Tahir-Ul-Qadri	24,949	31.86	
PML(Q)	Abdul Aleem Khan	20,545	26.23	
PML(N)	Ch. Naseer Ahmed Bhutta	18,271	23.33	
PPP	Mian |jaz-Ul-Hassan	12,203	15.58	
PTI	Dr. Usman Malik	2,187	2.79	
Independent	Muhammad Duryab Yousaf Qureshi Al-Hashmi	161	0.21	
Turnout		79,868	33.69	
Total valid votes		78,316	98.06	
Rejected ballots		1,552	1.94	
Majority		4,404	5.63	
Registered electors		237,065		

== Election 2008 ==
General elections were held on 18 February 2008. Chaudhry Naseer Ahmed Bhutta of PML-N won by 53,602 votes.

General election 2008: NA-127 Lahore-X
Party	Candidate	Votes	%	±%
PML(N)	Ch. Naseer Ahmed Bhutta	53,602	57.60	
PPP	Dr. Muhammad Riaz	21,698	23.32	
PML(Q)	Abdul Aleem Khan	13,707	14.73	
Others	Others (eight candidates)	4,045	4.35	
Turnout		94,390	33.82	
Total valid votes		93,052	98.58	
Rejected ballots		1,338	1.42	
Majority		31,904	34.28	
Registered electors		279,080		
PML(N) gain from PAT				

== Election 2013 ==
General elections were held on 11 May 2013. Waheed Alam Khan of PML-N won by 102,080 votes and became the member of National Assembly.

General election 2013: NA-127 Lahore-X
Party	Candidate	Votes	%	±%
PML(N)	Waheed Alam Khan	102,080	63.76	
PTI	Nasrullah Mughal	45,787	28.60	
Others	Others (twenty candidates)	12,241	7.64	
Turnout		162,509	49.22	
Total valid votes		160,108	98.52	
Rejected ballots		2,401	1.48	
Majority		56,293	35.16	
Registered electors		330,154		
PML(N) hold				

== Election 2018 ==
General elections were held on 25 July 2018.

General election 2018: NA-133 Lahore-XI
Party	Candidate	Votes	%	±%
PML(N)	Muhammad Pervaiz Malik	89,678	47.07	
PTI	Ejaz Chaudhary	77,231	40.53	
Others	Others (twelve candidates)	23,622	12.40	
Turnout		192,878	51.89	
Total valid votes		190,531	98.78	
Rejected ballots		2,347	1.22	
Majority		12,447	6.54	
Registered electors		371,676		
PML(N) hold		Swing	N/A	

== By-election 2021 ==
On 5 December 2021, a by-election was held due to the death of Pervaiz Malik, the former MNA from this seat. The PML-N's Shaista Pervaiz won the seat by receiving 46,811 votes defeating Pakistan Peoples Party (PPP)'s Aslam Gill who received 32,313 votes.

By-election 2021: NA-133 Lahore-XI
Party	Candidate	Votes	%	±%
PML(N)	Shaista Pervaiz	46,811	57.79	
PPP	Chaudhry Muhammad Aslam Gill	32,313	39.89	
Independent	Habibullah	650	0.80	
FDF	Syed Ghulam Fatima Gillani	377	0.47	
Independent	Waqif Tehmasab Kiyani	300	0.37	
TIP	Abdul Aziz	144	0.18	
Independent	Muhammad Nawaz Malik	115	0.14	
Independent	Sohail Shahzad	97	0.12	
Independent	Muhammad Hafeez	86	0.11	
Independent	Rana Khalid Mehmood	56	0.07	
Independent	Irfan Khalid	48	0.06	
Turnout		81,895	18.59	
Total valid votes		80,997	98.90	
Rejected ballots		898	1.10	
Majority		14,498	17.90	
Registered electors		440,485		
PML(N) hold		Swing	N/A	

== Election 2024 ==
General elections were held on 8 February 2024. Attaullah Tarar won the election with 98,214 votes.

General election 2024: NA-127 Lahore-XI
Party	Candidate	Votes	%	±%
PML(N)	Attaullah Tarar	98,214	45.22	▼12.57
PTI	Malik Zaheer Abbas (Note: Filed nomination papers as PTI candidate but ECP allowed him to run as an Independent)	82,282	37.89	
PPP	Bilawal Bhutto Zardari	15,005	6.91	▼32.98
TLP	Matloob Ahmad	12,914	5.95	
Others	Others (twenty-one candidates)	8,762	4.03	
Turnout		219,686	41.68	▲23.09
Total valid votes		217,177	98.86	
Rejected ballots		2,509	1.14	
Majority		15,932	7.34	▼10.56
Registered electors		527,044		
PML(N) hold		Swing	N/A	

== See also ==
- NA-126 Lahore-X
- NA-128 Lahore-XII
