= NA-121 Lahore-V =

Constituency of the National Assembly of Pakistan

- Constituency for the National Assembly of Pakistan
- Region: Lahore City area of Lahore District
- Electorate: 467,012

Current constituency
- Party: Pakistan Muslim League (N)
- Member: Waseem Qadir

NA-121 Lahore-V ( این اے-121, لاہور-5) is a constituency for the National Assembly of Pakistan.

== Members of Parliament ==
=== 2018–2023: NA-128 Lahore-VI ===
| Election | Member | Party |
|---|---|---|
| 2018 | Shaikh Rohale Asghar | PML (N) |

=== 2024–present: NA-121 Lahore-V ===
| Election | Member | Party |
|---|---|---|
| 2024 | Waseem Qadir | PML (N) |

== Election 2002 ==
General elections were held on 10 October 2002. Aitzaz Ahsan of PPP won by 27,072 votes.

General election 2002: NA-124 Lahore-VII
| Party | Candidate | Votes | % | ±% |
|---|---|---|---|---|
| PPP | Aitazaz Ahsan | 27,072 | 35.39 | |
| MMA | Muhammad Abid Jalali | 23,974 | 31.34 | |
| PML(Q) | Khurram Rohail Asghar | 23,110 | 30.21 | |
| Others | Others (four candidates) | 2,335 | 3.06 | |
| Turnout | | 77,865 | 30.45 | |
| Total valid votes | | 76,491 | 98.24 | |
| Rejected ballots | | 1,374 | 1.76 | |
| Majority | | 3,098 | 4.05 | |
| Registered electors | | 255,757 | | |

== Election 2008 ==
General elections were held on 18 February 2008. Shaikh Rohale Asghar prominent leader of PML-N won by 71,342 votes.

General election 2008: NA-124 Lahore-VII
| Party | Candidate | Votes | % | ±% |
|---|---|---|---|---|
| PML(N) | Shaikh Rohale Asghar | 71,342 | 67.01 | |
| PPP | Ayaz Imran | 23,412 | 21.99 | |
| PML(Q) | Hamayun Akhtar Khan | 10,881 | 10.22 | |
| Others | Others (three candidates) | 823 | 0.78 | |
| Turnout | | 108,488 | 39.35 | |
| Total valid votes | | 106,458 | 98.13 | |
| Rejected ballots | | 2,030 | 1.87 | |
| Majority | | 47,930 | 45.02 | |
| Registered electors | | 275,697 | | |
| PML(N) gain from PPP | | | | |

== Election 2013 ==
General elections were held on 11 May 2013. Shaikh Rohale Asghar senior politician of PML-N and strong political figure from the constituency won by 119,312 votes and became the member of National Assembly.

General election 2013: NA-124 Lahore-VII
| Party | Candidate | Votes | % | ±% |
|---|---|---|---|---|
| PML(N) | Shaikh Rohale Asghar | 119,312 | 69.65 | |
| PTI | Walid Iqbal | 42,561 | 24.84 | |
| Others | Others (seventeen candidates) | 9,439 | 5.51 | |
| Turnout | | 173,743 | 53.86 | |
| Total valid votes | | 171,312 | 98.60 | |
| Rejected ballots | | 2,431 | 1.40 | |
| Majority | | 76,751 | 44.81 | |
| Registered electors | | 322,562 | | |
| PML(N) hold | | | | |

== Election 2018 ==
General elections were held on 25 July 2018.

General election 2018: NA-128 Lahore-VI
| Party | Candidate | Votes | % | ±% |
|---|---|---|---|---|
| PML(N) | Shaikh Rohale Asghar | 98,199 | 52.49 | |
| PTI | Chaudhary Ijaz Ahmad Dayal | 52,774 | 28.21 | |
| Others | Others (twelve candidates) | 36,103 | 19.30 | |
| Turnout | | 190,893 | 55.21 | |
| Total valid votes | | 187,080 | 98.00 | |
| Rejected ballots | | 3,813 | 2.00 | |
| Majority | | 45,425 | 24.28 | |
| Registered electors | | 345,763 | | |

== Election 2024 ==
General elections were held on 8 February 2024. Waseem Qadir won the election with 78,707 votes. Although he was elected as an independent with support of PTI, he joined PML(N) soon after his election.

General election 2024: NA-121 Lahore-V
| Party | Candidate | Votes | % | ±% |
|---|---|---|---|---|
| PML(N) | Waseem Qadir | 78,707 | 42.76 | ▲14.55 |
| PML(Q) | Shaikh Rohale Asghar | 70,598 | 38.35 | ▼14.14 |
| TLP | Muhammad Yousaf | 24,883 | 13.52 | ▲2.44 |
| Others | Others (eleven candidates) | 9,896 | 5.38 | |
| Turnout | | 187,173 | 40.08 | ▼15.13 |
| Total valid votes | | 184,084 | 98.35 | |
| Rejected ballots | | 3,089 | 1.65 | |
| Majority | | 8,109 | 4.41 | |
| Registered electors | | 467,012 | | |

== See also ==
- NA-120 Lahore-IV
- NA-122 Lahore-VI
