= Ashtar Ausaf =

Pakistani lawyer

Ashtar Ausaf, SI
- اشتر اوصاف
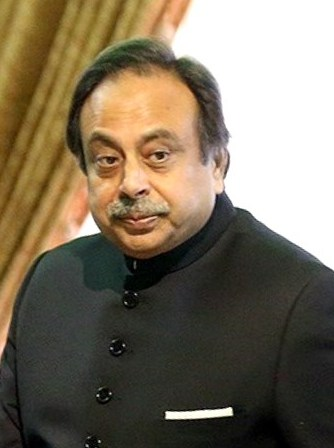

29th and 32nd Attorney-General for Pakistan
- In office 9 May 2022 – 19 January 2023
- President: Arif Alvi
- Prime Minister: Shehbaz Sharif
- Preceded by: Khalid Jawed Khan
- Succeeded by: Shehzad Ata Elahi
- In office 29 March 2016 – 21 June 2018
- President: Mamnoon Hussain
- Prime Minister: Nawaz Sharif; Shahid Khaqan Abbasi; Nasir-ul-Mulk
- Preceded by: Salman Aslam Butt
- Succeeded by: Khalid Jawed Khan

Special Assistant to the Prime Minister on Law and Justice
- In office 25 February 2015 – 28 March 2016
- Prime Minister: Nawaz Sharif
- Succeeded by: Zafarullah Khan

29th and 35th Advocate General of Punjab
- In office 2 January 2012 – 5 April 2013
- Governor: Latif Khosa
- Preceded by: Khawaja Haris
- Succeeded by: Shahid Karim
- In office 20 November 1998 – 12 October 1999
- Governor: Shahid Hamid
- Preceded by: Khawaja Muhammad Sharif
- Succeeded by: Maqbool Elahi Malik

3rd Prosecutor General of Punjab
- In office 15 September 2011 – 2 January 2012
- Governor: Latif Khosa
- Preceded by: Syed Zahid Hussain
- Succeeded by: Sadaqat Ali Khan

Personal details
- Born: 19 June 1956 (age 70) Lahore, Dominion of Pakistan
- Children: Fatima Ali (1989-2019)
- Education: Forman Christian College; Punjab University; George Washington University
- Occupation: Lawyer
- Awards: Sitara-e-Imtiaz

Ashtar Ausaf Ali, SI (born 19 June 1956) is a Pakistani lawyer who twice served as the Attorney General for Pakistan from 2016 to 2018, and from 2022 to 2023. In his first term, he co-drafted the Twenty-Fifth Amendment to the Constitution of Pakistan, which merged the Federally Administered Tribal Areas with Khyber Pakhtunkhwa.

Ausaf previously served as Special Assistant to the Prime Minister on Law and Justice from 2015 to 2016, twice as Advocate General of Punjab from 1998 to 1999 and 2012 to 2013, and as Prosecutor General of the Punjab province from 2011 to 2012.

His daughter was the chef Fatima Ali, who died of cancer in 2019, at the age of 29.

== Early life and education ==
Ausaf was born in Lahore, Pakistan, the eldest son of lawyer and diplomat Iftikhar Ali Sheikh. He completed his Bachelor of Arts from Forman Christian College in 1975, and his LLB from Punjab University in 1980, where he also taught as adjunct lecturer for international law from 1984 to 1988. He became a member of the Lahore Bar Association in 1980, and was awarded an MCL from George Washington University, where he was a member of the Phi Delta Phi legal fraternity.

== Legal career ==
Ausaf came to prominence in the 1990s as a litigator and constitutional lawyer. After President Ghulam Ishaq Khan dismissed the government of Prime Minister Nawaz Sharif in 1993, he successfully represented Sharif before the Supreme Court of Pakistan against the dissolution of parliament. The Supreme Court overturned the dismissal, and Sharif was re-elected in 1997. Ausaf was then appointed Advisor to the Prime Minister on human rights. He was appointed Advocate General of Punjab in May 1998, but resigned from his post when General Pervez Musharraf overthrew the Sharif government in a military coup.

=== Detention during emergency rule ===
Ausaf supported the Lawyers' Movement for the restoration of an independent judiciary. After Musharraf declared a state of emergency in 2007, Ausaf was detained by the military regime from the Lahore office of the Human Rights Commission of Pakistan on 5 November 2007. He suffered a heart attack in custody and was hospitalised.

== Advocate General of Punjab ==
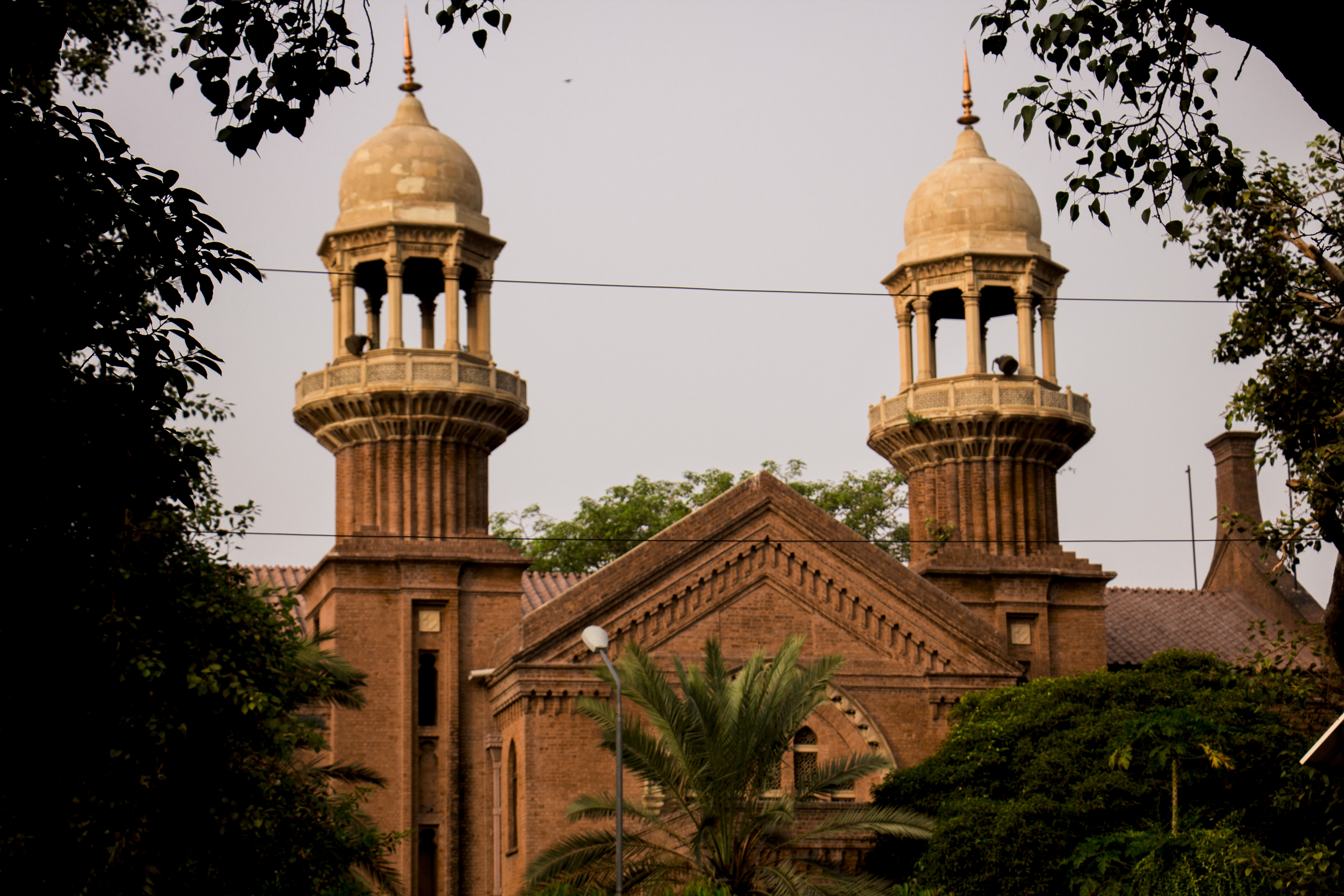
Lahore High Court

Following general elections in 2008, General Musharraf resigned as President. The Pakistan Muslim League (Nawaz) formed the provincial government in Punjab, and Ausaf was appointed Prosecutor General of the province in 2011, before again being appointed Advocate General on 2 January 2012, having first served at the post 14 years ago. He stepped down when the caretaker government took over for the 2013 elections, and resumed private practice at his law firm, Ashtar Ali & Co.

=== Escape from gun attack ===
On 29 June 2013, Ausaf's convoy came across two armed dacoits robbing a woman in Garden Town, Lahore. Ausaf ordered his guards to intervene, upon which the dacoits opened fire on Ausaf's car. Although a bullet hit his car, Ausaf was unharmed. After fleeing the scene, the dacoits were arrested from Band Road.

== Special Assistant to the Prime Minister ==
Following Pakistan Muslim League (Nawaz)'s victory in the general elections in 2013, Ausaf was appointed to Prime Minister Sharif's cabinet as Special Assistant to the Prime Minister on Law, with the status of Minister of State, on 25 February 2015, and handed charge of the Ministry of Law and Justice.

== Attorney-General for Pakistan ==
=== First tenure (2016–2018) ===
Supreme Court of Pakistan

Ausaf was appointed the 29th Attorney-General for Pakistan in a cabinet reshuffle on 29 March 2016, following the resignation of Salman Aslam Butt, with Ahmed Malik Minister for Law and Justice in Ausaf's place. As Attorney-General, he co-drafted the Twenty-Fifth Amendment to the Constitution of Pakistan, which merged the Federally Administered Tribal Areas with Khyber Pakhtunkhwa province.

He resigned on 20 June 2018 stating the need to ensure free and fair elections, and a smooth democratic transition.

=== Second tenure (2022–2023) ===
Ausaf returned as AG on 9 May 2022, when President Arif Alvi approved his appointment on the advice of Prime Minister Shehbaz Sharif. Ausaf tendered his resignation in October, citing severe health issues, and recovering from surgery. Sharif directed him to continue in office until the government named his replacement. His resignation was formally accepted on 19 January 2023, after the designated Attorney General, Mansoor Usman Awan, recused himself from the post.

== Also See ==
- Attorney General for Pakistan
- Advocate General Punjab
- Supreme Court Bar Association of Pakistan

Legal offices
Preceded by Khawaja Muhammad Sharif	Advocate General Punjab; 1998–1999	Succeeded by Maqbool Elahi Malik
Preceded by Syed Zahid Hussain	Prosecutor General Punjab; 2011–2012	Succeeded by Sadaqat Ali Khan
Preceded by Khawaja Haris	Advocate General Punjab; 2012–2013	Succeeded by Shahid Karim
Preceded by Salman Aslam Butt	Attorney-General for Pakistan; 2016–2018	Succeeded by Khalid Jawed Khan
Preceded by Khalid Jawed Khan	Attorney-General for Pakistan; 2022–2023	Succeeded by Mansoor Usman Awan
Political offices
New office	Special Assistant to the Prime Minister on Law and Justice; 2015–2016	Succeeded by Zafarullah Khan
