= Ayesha Mumtaz =

Ayesha Mumtaz (Urdu: عائشہ ممتاز) is a former Director of Operations at Punjab Food Authority in Pakistan.

== Career ==
Ms. Mumtaz hails from a middle income family in Lahore, Pakistan and belongs to the Provincial Civil Services (PCS) cadre. She rose to fame after raiding various restaurants and hotels to ensure the quality of food and hygiene. She sealed many eateries while fined others for providing unhygienic food to consumers and other noncompliant acts. Her work is being highly appreciated by the Government of Punjab, Pakistan and especially by the people of Punjab, while food-sellers feared her unannounced raids. Her popularity is manifested by the 61,000 fans she has gained on Facebook.

She joined Punjab Food Authority on 1 June 2015. In November 2015, Punjab Food Authority with the collaboration of USAID and the University of Veterinary and Animal Sciences (UVAS), Lahore, Department of Dairy Technology and Department of Food Science & Human Nutrition, she was running a project called Data Collection for the Assessment of Supply of Loose Milk in Lahore.

Ayesha Mumtaz had even raided Sharif Medical City, a hospital associated with the then prime minister of Pakistan, Nawaz Sharif. In public comments in a newspaper, people seemed surprised by her honesty, boldness, efficiency and fearless unannounced raids to check food quality for the welfare and health of common people.

=== Controversial leave issue ===
She was sacked from her job in October 2016, following allegations of corruption involving her driver. According to The Economist, "she made enemies in the food business and among politicians connected with it." Since her sacking, according to Lahoris, there has been a decrease in the food safety inspections.

She was herself asked about her controversial "leave issue" by a newspaper reporter. At that time, she had told the reporter that she needed the leave for treatment of her parents and indicated that she did not leave her job due to any differences with the newly-appointed director general of Punjab Food Authority, Noorul Amin Mengal. Mengal, at least publicly, also called her a "good officer" and added that she was on leave for personal reasons. The newspaper report also said that she was on leave for 104 days.

=== False identity rumours ===
In 2015, some Pakistani news media carried some false rumours about her being one of the daughters of the late film comedian Saeed Khan Rangeela (1937 – 2005). Ayesha Mumtaz herself quashed those false rumours by saying, "Rangeela was a legendary comedian actor but I do not have any connection with him."
