= Shaikh Rohale Asghar =

Pakistani politician

- شیخ روحیل اصغر

Member of the National Assembly of Pakistan
- In office 13 August 2018 – 10 August 2023
- Constituency: NA-128 (Lahore-VI)
- In office 2008 – 31 May 2018
- Constituency: NA-124 (Lahore-VII)
- In office 1985–1988

Personal details
- Born: 24 October 1952 (age 74)
- Party: PPP (2026-present)
- Other political affiliations: PMLN (1993-2026); IND (1985); IJI (1990-1993)

Shaikh Rohale Asghar (Urdu: شیخ روحیل اصغر; born 24 October 1952) is a Pakistani politician who had been a member of the National Assembly of Pakistan from August 2018 till August 2023. He served as Advisor to Prime Minister Shehbaz Sharif with the status of Federal Minister. Previously, he was a member of the National Assembly from 1985 to 1988 and again from 2008 to May 2018. He was a member of the Provincial Assembly of the Punjab from 1990 to 1993.

An influential figure of the Pakistan Muslim League (N), from Daroghawala Lahore, he has served as Advisor to the Prime Minister Shehbaz Sharif.

== Early life and family ==
He was born on 24 October 1952 into a Kashmiri Shaikh family. Both his late father Sheikh Asghar and his late brother Sheikh Shakeel Asghar were involved in politics and were members of provincial assembly of Punjab.

His son Khurram Rohale Asghar has served as the PML-N Youth Wing Lahore President. His daughter Ayesha Rohale is involved in British politics, having served as a Liberal Democrat councillor for Welwyn Hatfield. His other son, Ali Rohale Asghar, is a businessman. Ali’s daughter, Shanzay Rohale, is married to Junaid Safdar, the son of Maryam Nawaz Sharif.

== Political career ==
He was elected to the National Assembly of Pakistan from Constituency NA-83 (Lahore-III) in the 1985 Pakistani general election.

He ran for the seat of the National Assembly as a candidate of Islami Jamhoori Ittehad (IJI) from Constituency NA-93 (Lahore-II) in the 1988 Pakistani general election but was unsuccessful. He received 41,181 votes and lost the seat to Aitzaz Ahsan.

He was elected to the Provincial Assembly of the Punjab as a candidate of IJI from Constituency PP-118 (Lahore-III) in the 1990 Pakistani general election. He received 42,058 votes and defeated Mian Aziz-ur-Rehman Chan, a candidate of Pakistan Democratic Alliance (PDA).

He ran for the seat of the Provincial Assembly of the Punjab as an independent candidate from Constituency PP-118 (Lahore-III) in the 1993 Pakistani general election but was unsuccessful. He received 9,432 votes and lost the seat to Muhammad Hanif Ramay, a candidate of Pakistan Peoples Party (PPP).

He ran for the seat of the Provincial Assembly of the Punjab as a candidate of PPP from Constituency PP-118 (Lahore-III) in the 1997 Pakistani general election but was unsuccessful. He received 17,419 votes and lost the seat to Haji Imdad Hussain, a candidate of Pakistan Muslim League (N) (PML-N).

He was re-elected to the National Assembly as a candidate of PML-N from Constituency NA-124 (Lahore-VII) in the 2008 Pakistani general election. He received 71,342 votes and defeated Ayaz Imran, a candidate of PPP.

He was re-elected to the National Assembly as a candidate of PML-N from Constituency NA-124 (Lahore-VII) in the 2013 Pakistani general election. He received 119,312 votes and defeated Walid Iqbal, a candidate of Pakistan Tehreek-e-Insaf (PTI).

He was re-elected to the National Assembly as a candidate of PML-N from Constituency NA-128 (Lahore-VI) in the 2018 Pakistani general election. He received 98,199 votes and defeated Aijaz Ahmed, a candidate of PTI.
