= Shehzad Ata Elahi =

Pakistani attorney general

Attorney General of Pakistan
- In office 2 February 2023 – 24 March 2023
- Preceded by: Ashtar Ausaf Ali
- Succeeded by: Mansoor Usman Awan

Chairman of the Pakistan Bar Council
- In office 2 February 2023 – 24 March 2023
- Preceded by: Ashtar Ausaf Ali
- Succeeded by: Mansoor Usman Awan

Personal details
- Education: LL.B. (Hons.), Inns of Court School of Law, Post Graduate Diploma in Professional Legal Skills
- Alma mater: King's College London
- Profession: Lawyer, Advocate
- Known for: Former Attorney General of Pakistan
- Awards: Chambers Asia Pacific (2022), Asia Pacific Legal 500 (2022), and Chambers Global (2021)

Shehzad Ata Elahi is a Pakistani lawyer who was the Attorney General of Pakistan from February 2023 to March 2023. He has expertise in various areas of law.

== Education ==
Elahi attended King's College London from 1996 to 1999, where he obtained an LL.B. (Hons.) degree, and then went to the Inns of Court School of Law in London from 1999 to 2000, where he passed the Bar Vocational Course. He was called to the Bar of England and Wales at the Honourable Society of Lincoln's Inn. Elahi is a member of the Lahore High Court Bar Association and the Supreme Court Bar Association of Pakistan.

== Career ==
Elahi has been an advocate in the Lower Courts of Pakistan since 2001, the High Courts of Pakistan since 2003, and the Supreme Court of Pakistan since 2015. He worked as an associate in the law firm of Cornelius, Lane & Mufti from 2000 to 2006 and was a partner in the same firm from 2006 to 2023.

Elahi has been recognized for his work in various areas of law by Chambers Asia Pacific (2022), Asia Pacific Legal 500 (2022), and Chambers Global (2021).

== Appointment and resignation as AGP ==
In February 2023, Elahi was appointed as the Attorney General of Pakistan and Chairman of the Pakistan Bar Council. However, he resigned from his position as Attorney General shortly after his appointment from 2 February to 24 March 2023.

== Personal life ==
Elahi is the grandson of former President Fazal Ilahi Chaudhry.
