= Salman Aslam Butt =

Pakistani lawyer

31st Attorney-General for Pakistan
- In office 16 January 2014 – 28 March 2016
- President: Mamnoon Hussain
- Prime Minister: Nawaz Sharif
- Preceded by: Munir A. Malik
- Succeeded by: Ashtar Ausaf Ali

Personal details
- Born: Lahore, Pakistan
- Education: University of the Punjab University of London
- Profession: Lawyer, advisor & consultant

The Supreme Court Building where the office of the Attorney General for Pakistan is situated

Salman Aslam Butt is a Lahore based lawyer & advisor, who was born & grew up in Lahore. He was appointed as 31st Attorney General for Pakistan in 2014 and he represented Nawaz Sharif Government. He also presented Nawaz Sharif in the Panama case.

== Early life and education ==
He was born in Lahore and completed his education also in Lahore. After graduation, he was admitted in Punjab University Law College and earned a Law Degree of LL.B. before moving to London to complete his LL.M. from the University of London. He joined the legal profession in 1982. He is senior Partner of M/s Cornelius, Lane & Mufti (CLM) the oldest Law Firm in Pakistan.

== Attorney General for Pakistan ==
Salman was appointed as the 31st Attorney General for Pakistan after the election of 2013 and remained there till 2016 when he resigned. He appeared in the Supreme Court of Pakistan to represent Prime Minister Nawaz Sharif in the famous Panama case in which at subsequent stages of the case and after his resignation, Nawaz Sharif was declared disqualified from the office of Prime Minister by the Supreme Court of Pakistan.

== Area of practice ==
He and his Law Firm CLM deals in documentation, consultation, legislation, aviation, energy, tax and litigation of constitutional, commercial, corporate, banking, Insurance, civil, criminal, family, rent matters, and all legal matters.

== See also ==
- Supreme Court Bar Association of Pakistan
- Lahore High Court Bar Association
- Attorney General for Pakistan
