= Syed Mohammad Inaamullah =

S. M. Inaamullah
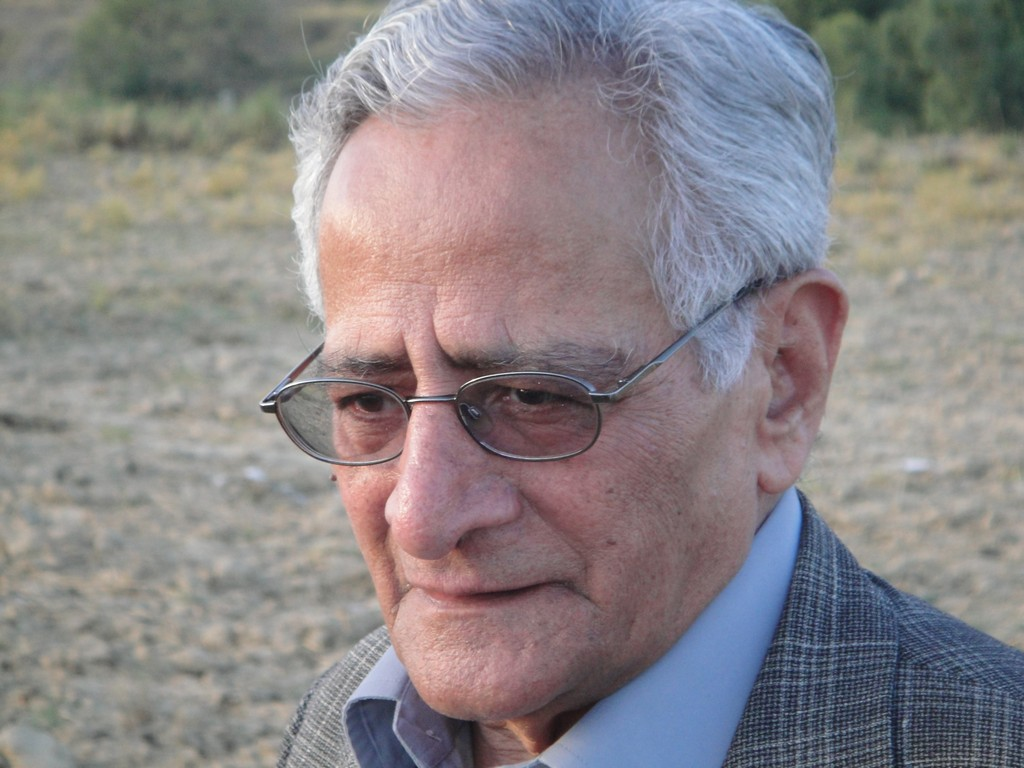

Ambassador of Pakistan
- In office 1986–1999

Personal details
- Born: Syed Mohammad Inaamullah Shah; 18 May 1937 Lahore, Pakistan
- Died: June 26, 2018
- Spouse: Shams Inaam
- Education: University of the Punjab; Marburg University; National Defence University, Islamabad; Quaid-i-Azam University
- Occupation: Diplomat (retd.) senior analyst
- Website: inaam.net

S. M. Inaamullah (Urdu: ﺳﻴﺪ ﻣﺤﻤﺪ ﺍﻧﻌﺎﻡ ﺍ ﻟﻠﮫ), an Ambassador of Pakistan was born on 18 May 1937 in Lahore – Pakistan to an illustrious aristocratic family of Syed Mohammad Uzairullah son of Nawab Syed Mohammad Hamidullah (Civil Servant), whose heritage stems from the Naqabdar families of Gilan, started by the sub-continental lineage of Syed Mohammad Ahmad.

Originally stemming from Arab origins, the Naqabdars were invited to the Mughal Courts as Judges of Islamic Jurisprudence and Law and served the rulers of the region as advisors and judges.

== Education ==
He received his education at an elite school in Lahore – Central Model School (Bronze Medal – Punjab), and went on to Graduate in Political Science & Philosophy from Government College in Lahore in 1957 and subsequently did his Masters in English Literature in 1960 from the University of Punjab.

During this period, he obtained his first part-time job at the German Cultural Center in Lahore and went on to head the Center after a few years.

Following his passion for the German language, he went to further his knowledge in the language at the German Language Institute in Arolsen & Brilon and subsequently did his second master's degree from the Marburg University in Philosophy.

== Early career ==
During his studies, he worked as a part-time journalist with the Deutsche Presse Agentur (DPA) and returned to Pakistan as a Press Officer in the German Embassy in Karachi. He joined the Voice of Germany (Deutsche Welle) in 1966 and was Chief Editor of its Urdu Service till 1972.

== Diplomatic career ==
Participating in the Foreign Service entrance exam in 1972, qualified from the Administrative Staff College to become a diplomat, where he served as Director External Publicity at the Ministry of Foreign Affairs, Tripoli – Libya as First Secretary (1974–1976), Kabul – Afghanistan as Counsellor (1976–1978), Vienna – Austria as Alternate Permanent Representative to various United Nations Organizations in Vienna Pakistan's Mission to the United Nations(1978–1981).

After returning to Islamabad as Director East Asia and Pacific he went on to graduate from the prestigious National Defence University, Islamabad (1983) and received his third master's degree in Defence & Strategic Studies from Quaid-i-Azam University, Islamabad.

Furthermore, during the National Defence Course, he also attended the National Defense University(NDU) in the United States.

He was posted back to the Ministry of Foreign Affairs as Director General Soviet Union & Eastern Europe and was then appointed as Minister & Charge d' Affaires a.p. to Aden – South Yemen (1984–1986).

From there he went on as Ambassador of Pakistan to Tripoli – Libya (1986–1989) and subsequently posted as Ambassador of Pakistan to Poland & Czechoslovakia (1990–1993).

Returning to the National Defence University, Islamabad as Senior Directing Staff for International Relations & Foreign Affairs (1993–1994), he was appointed as Additional Secretary Ministry of Foreign Affairs for Economic Coordination (1994–1996).

Subsequently, he was posted as Ambassador of Pakistan to Switzerland, the Holy See and Liechtenstein(1996–1999)and retired from his diplomatic stint in 1999.

== Post-retirement ==
Ambassador (R) S. M. Inaamullah was a senior commentator on international relations for Pakistan Television, Radio Pakistan and appeared on several private Pakistani satellite channels including GEO Television, Dawn News, and News One (Pakistani TV channel). Additionally, he served as Director Regional Studies at the Institute of Strategic Studies; Research and Analysis (ISSRA) at the National Defence University, Islamabad.

Ambassador Inaamullah was the President of Association of retired Ambassadors from 2002 to 2003.

== Personal life ==
Ambassador S.M.Inaamullah was an avid writer and regularly contributed editorials to a variety of newspapers and institutes.

He was married to Shams Inaam, who died of a protracted illness in 1974.

He has a son, Syed Fahim Inaam who is married to Umbereen Fahim Inaam (daughter of Lt. Gen. Aftab Ahmad Khan) and a daughter, Syeda Romana Inaam married to Lt. Gen. Zahid Hussain Khan and has two grandchildren Syeda Sharmeen Inaam and Wahid Hussain Khan respectively.

== Disambiguation note ==
S. M. Inaamullah's name is sometimes misspelled as S. M. Inamullah or as S. M. Inam Ullah.

Diplomatic posts
Preceded by Zia Ispahani	Ambassador of Pakistan, Switzerland, Holy See & Liechtenstein; 1996–1999	Succeeded by Tayyab Siddiqui
Preceded by Abdul Basit Haqqani	Ambassador of Pakistan, Poland & Czechoslovakia; 1990–1993	Succeeded by Hasan Sarmad
Preceded by Moeed Khan	Ambassador of Pakistan, Libya; 1986–1990	Succeeded by ??
Preceded by Mian Liaqat Mahmud	Minister/Charge d' Affairs a.p., South Yemen; 1984–1986	Succeeded by Brig.(r) Sardar Ahmad
Preceded by Post created	Counsellor & Alternate Permanent Representative of Pakistan UNIDO & IAEA, Austria; 1979–1980	Succeeded by Aziz Ahmed Khan
Preceded by Rashid Ahmed	Counsellor/Head of Chancery, Afghanistan; 1976–1979	Succeeded by ??
Preceded by Javaid Hussain	First Secretary/Head of Chancery, Libya; 1974–1976	Succeeded by Col.(r) Amir Ali Shah
