= Chahat Fateh Ali Khan =

Pakistani cricketer and singer

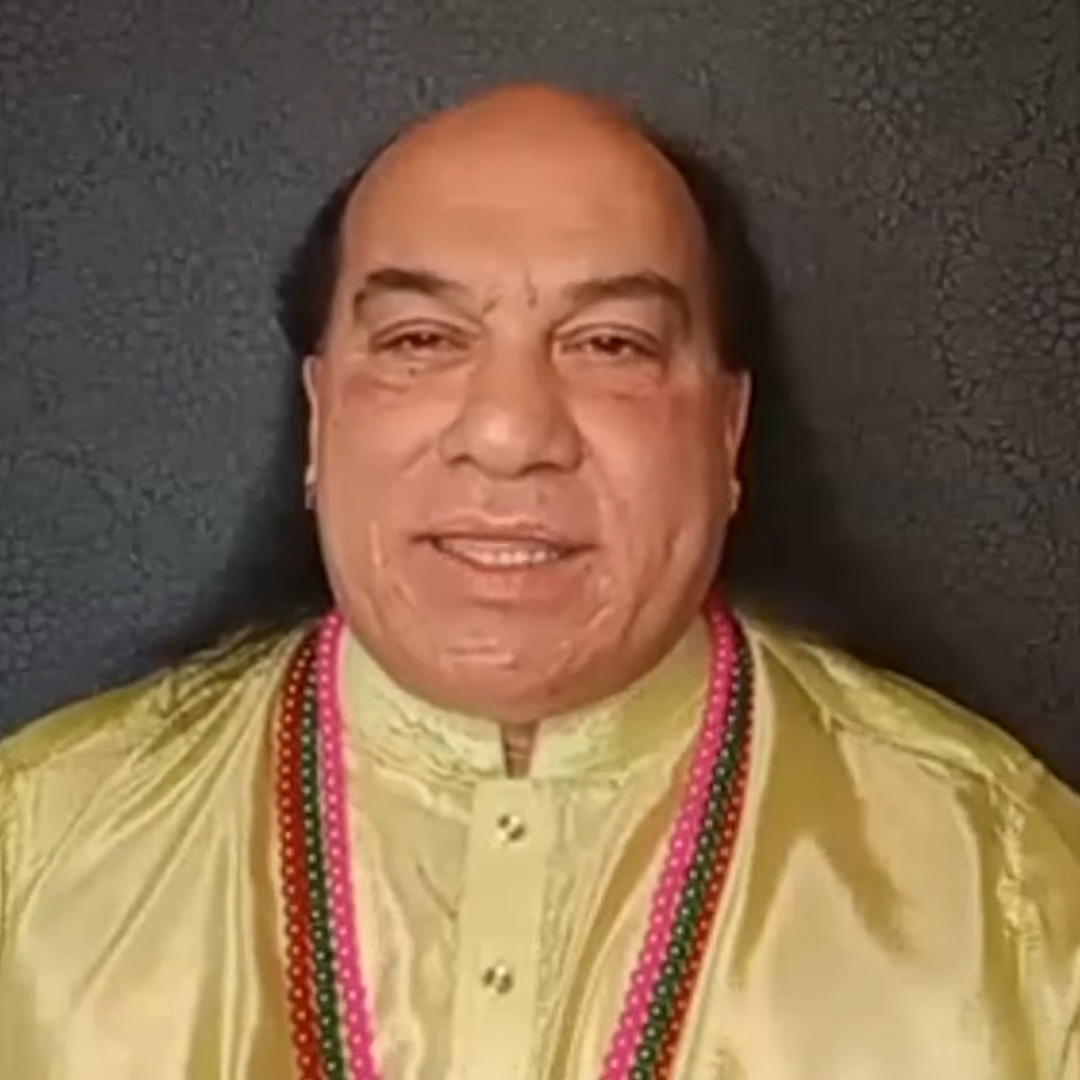

Personal information
- Full name: Kashif Rana
- Born: March 1965 (age 61); Lahore, Punjab, Pakistan

Domestic team information
- Years: Team
- 1983/84: Lahore Division

Career statistics
Competition	First-class
Matches	2
Runs scored	16
Batting average	5.33
100s/50s	0/0
Top score	10
Balls bowled	–
Wickets	–
Bowling average	–
5 wickets in innings	–
10 wickets in match	–
Best bowling	–
Catches/stumpings	1/–
- Source: CricketArchive, 14 April 2026

Kashif Rana (born March 1965), better known by his stage name Chahat Fateh Ali Khan, is a British Pakistani singer and former cricketer. He played first-class cricket for Lahore Division in the 1983/84 season of the Patron's Trophy, before later gaining attention as a singer and internet personality.

== Career ==
Rana made his first-class debut for Lahore Division against Rawalpindi in the 1983/84 BCCP Patron's Trophy on 13 October 1983. His second and final first-class appearance came against Dera Ismail Khan later that month. In 2 first-class matches, he scored 16 runs at a batting average of 5.33, with a highest score of 10, and took 1 catch in the field. He has stated that during his early cricketing years, he was involved in selecting Aaqib Javed for the government school cricket team in Sheikhupura and that Javed played under his captaincy.

After leaving Pakistan, Rana moved to the United Kingdom and played club cricket there for 12 years. He later worked as a minicab driver in London. During the COVID-19 lockdowns, he began uploading singing videos to social media under the name Chahat Fateh Ali Khan and attracted attention for songs such as "Tun Tuna Tun".

In 2023, Rana released his own song for the Pakistan Super League, titled "Ye Jo Piara PSL Hai". The following year, his rendition of "Bado Badi" went viral on social media, but was later removed from YouTube after a copyright claim linked to Noor Jehan's original "Akh Larhi Bado Badi".

== Discography ==
- "Pyara PSL"
- "Lota Lota"
- "Bol Kaffara"
- "Tu Chor Chor Chor"
- "Kameez teri kaali"
- "Bado Badi"
- "chuto chuto"
- "Kashif Rani ki Ammi"
- "My Kashaf"
- "Somia meri jaanu"
