= Olive Christian Malvery =

Anglo-Indian journalist, editor

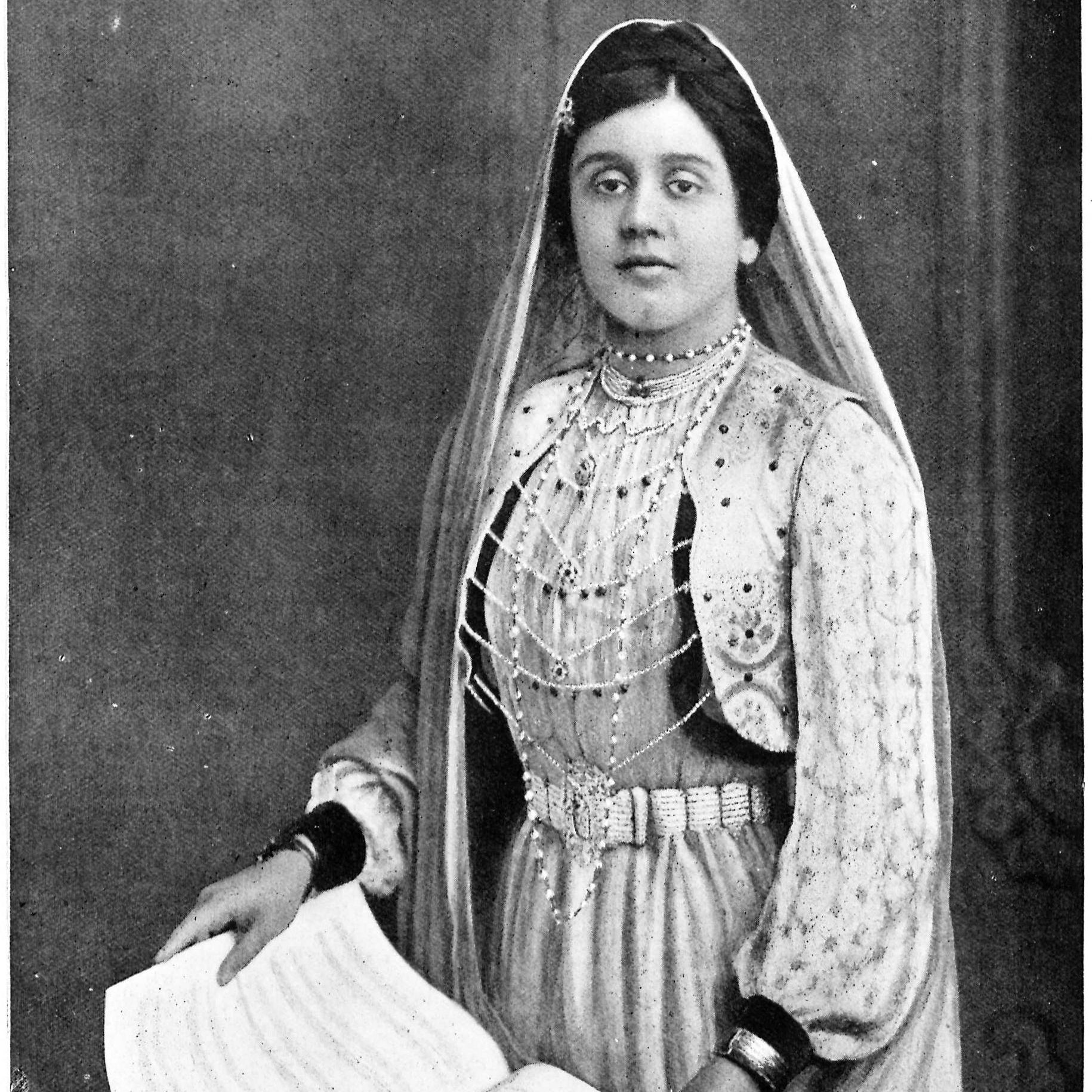
- Born: 1871; Lahore
- Died: 1914 (aged 42–43)
- Other name: Mrs Archibald Mackirdy
- Education: The Royal College of Music
- Occupations: Writer, journalist
- Years active: 1904–1914
- Era: Edwardian
- Employer: Pearson's Magazine
- Spouse: Archibald Mackirdy

Olive Christian Malvery was an Anglo-Indian journalist, best known for her investigations into the working conditions of women and children in London.

== Early life ==
Malvery was born in Lahore, in the Punjab, in 1871 from parents of European and Indian ancestry. Following her parents' separation, she and her brother were raised as Anglican in India by her maternal grandparents. Both siblings were well-educated.

She moved to London in 1900 to train as a professional singer at The Royal College of Music. To support herself during this time she gave elocution lessons, wrote fiction for periodicals and gave drawing-room performances about Indian legends.

== Career ==
In 1904, she was commissioned to write a seven-part series of articles for Pearson's Magazine, in which she "targeted her middle-class readers with stark undercover exposés of life in the slums of London's East End". For this she explored women's work in various trades by disguising herself as a street singer, street peddler, factory girl, shop girl, costermonger, waitress, and barmaid. The series 'The Heart of All Things' appeared in the magazine between November 1904 and May 1905, before being published together in her first book, The Soul Market. The success of this book led to Malvery being in great demand as a public speaker.

Malvery donated some of the royalties from her books to Christian charities and to build two shelters for homeless women in London. Malvery describes the success of The Soul Market as "the first book that roused the public to shame and sympathy". This would appear to have affected charitable giving, as she later went on to say, "To-day there are a great many Mission [sic] which have been founded by people who were stirred by that book".

Her work extended to campaigns for the regulation of the sex trade in British prostitutes sent overseas. She did not call for the abolition of the trade for fear of the negative impact on the women who would still be forced to work. Her article on the topic, The White Slave Trade Market, was published in 1912.

Malvery also lectured for the temperance movement in Europe and North America. As part of her work within this movement, she supported youth clubs – namely the 'Girls' Guild' and the 'Lads' Club' – at Hoxton Hall, a community centre in East London which was at the time home to the Blue Ribbon Gospel Temperance Mission. Her goal was to create leisure spaces for the working-class population which were not centred around alcohol consumption, as an alternative to public houses. Her social connections allowed her to organise fundraising events which allowed Hoxton Hall to extend its reach to social, medical, educational, and domestic care for local young people.

== Works ==
- The Alien Question (1905)
- The Soul Market. New York: McClure, Phillips & Co, 1907
- Baby Toilers. London: Hutchinson, 1907
- Thirteen Nights. London: Hodder and Stoughton, 1908.
- The Speculator. London: T. Werner Laurie, 1908.
- Year and a Day. London: Hutchinson, 1912.
- Mackirdy, Olive C. M, and W N. Willis. The White Slave Market. London: S. Paul & Co, 1912.
- Mackirdy's Weekly (1914)

== Personal life ==
When Malvery married Archibald Mackirdy, a Scottish-born U.S. diplomat, she invited over a thousand London sex workers, flower sellers, and costermongers to her wedding reception, many of whom she had met through her undercover work. Her bridesmaids were East End child flower sellers from Hoxton. Malvery appeared in a number of London society columns in her wedding attire, a white Indian sari and veil.

Malvery and her husband had three children before he died in 1911.

She died aged 37 in 1914, having been ill with cancer. The cause of death was apparently from an accidental overdose of sedatives.
