= Attorney-General for Pakistan =

Chief law officer and legal advisor of the Government of Pakistan

- دادستان کل برائے پاکستان
- Incumbent; Mansoor Usman Awan since 27 March 2023
- Ministry of Law and Justice
- Style: Learned Attorney-General
- Abbreviation: AG
- Member of: Cabinet of Pakistan
- Reports to: Prime Minister of Pakistan
- Residence: Supreme Court of Pakistan
- Seat: Islamabad, Pakistan
- Nominator: Prime Minister of Pakistan
- Appointer: President of Pakistan; Qualified to be appointed as Justice of the Supreme Court
- Term length: No fixed term
- Formation: 12 November 1947
- First holder: Muhammad Wasim
- Website: www.agfp.gov.pk

Attorney-General for Pakistan is the chief law officer and legal advisor of the Government of Pakistan, serves as Pakistan's principal public prosecutor, and enjoys rights of audience before Parliament. The President appoints the attorney-general upon the recommendation of the Prime Minister. The Constitution bars the Attorney-General from private practice until the termination of their employment. The office was established in 1947.

The previous Attorney-General was Shehzad Ata Elahi, whose resignation was accepted on 24 March 2023. The longest-serving Attorney-General is Sharifuddin Pirzada, whereas Aziz A. Munshi held the office the most times, in four instances.

== List of attorneys-general ==
Ministry

Muslim League (2)
Pakistan People's Party (13)
Pakistan Muslim League (N) (6)
Pakistan Tehreek-e-Insaf (2)
Caretaker (4)
Military (9)

Number	Name	Period of office		Length of term (days)
1	Muhammad Wasim	12 November 1947	6 February 1950	817
2	Fayyaz Ali	10 November 1950	8 April 1959	3,071
3	Chaudhry Nazir Ahmad Khan	25 July 1959	26 October 1961	824
4	Tufail Ali Abdul Rehman	8 November 1961	31 October 1964	1,088
5	Sheikh Ghias Muhammad	31 October 1964	10 May 1965	191
6	Syed Sharifuddin Pirzada	9 April 1966	20 July 1966	102
7	Sheikh Ghias Muhammad	25 July 1966	6 August 1968	743
8	Syed Sharifuddin Pirzada	7 August 1968	21 December 1971	1,231
9	Yahya Bakhtiar	22 December 1971	5 July 1977	2,022
10	Syed Sharifuddin Pirzada	7 July 1977	1 January 1985	2,735
11	Aziz A. Munshi	8 January 1985	30 October 1986	660
12	Ali Ahmed Fazeel	30 October 1986	31 May 1988	579
13	Aziz A. Munshi	31 May 1988	3 December 1988	186
14	Yahya Bakhtiar	3 December 1988	6 August 1990	611
15	Aziz A. Munshi	7 August 1990	22 June 1993	1,050
-	Chaudhry Muhammad Farooq	24 July 1993	24 August 1993	51
-	Muhammad Sardar Khan	25 August 1993	25 October 1993	61
16	Fakhruddin G. Ebrahim	25 October 1993	2 April 1994	159
17	Qazi Muhammad Jamil	25 April 1994	17 October 1996	906
18	Iqbal Haider	19 October 1996	7 November 1996	19
-	Shahzad Jehangir	11 November 1996	9 April 1997	149
19	Chaudhry Muhammad Farooq	11 April 1997	15 October 1999	917
20	Aziz A. Munshi	2 November 1999	24 September 2001	692
21	Makhdoom Ali Khan	21 September 2001	1 August 2007	2,140
22	Malik Mohammad Qayyum	1 August 2007	19 August 2008	384
23	Latif Khosa	21 August 2008	10 December 2009	416
24	Anwar Mansoor Khan	24 December 2009	4 April 2010	101
25	Maulvi Anwar-ul-Haq	21 April 2010	12 April 2012	722
26	Irfan Qadir	12 April 2012	7 June 2013	426
27	Munir A. Malik	7 June 2013	14 January 2014	221
28	Salman Aslam Butt	16 January 2014	28 March 2016	802
29	Ashtar Ausaf Ali	29 March 2016	21 June 2018	814
-	Khalid Jawed Khan	22 June 2018	17 August 2018	56
30	Anwar Mansoor Khan	18 August 2018	20 February 2020	551
31	Khalid Jawed Khan	22 February 2020	10 April 2022	779
32	Ashtar Ausaf Ali	9 May 2022	19 January 2023	255
33	Shehzad Ata Elahi	2 February 2023	24 March 2023	50
34	Mansoor Usman Awan	27 March 2023		

== See also ==
- Attorney General
- Supreme Court of Pakistan
- Pakistan Bar Council
- Supreme Court Bar Association of Pakistan
