= NA-119 Lahore-III =

Constituency of the National Assembly of Pakistan

- Constituency for the National Assembly of Pakistan
- Region: Lahore City area of Lahore District
- Electorate: 530,167

Current constituency
- Created: 2018
- Party: Pakistan Muslim League (N)
- Member: Ali Pervaiz Malik
- Created from: NA-130 (Lahore-XIII)

NA-119 Lahore-III ( این اے-119، لاہور-3) is a newly-created constituency for the National Assembly of Pakistan. It mainly comprises areas of Shalimar Tehsil along the India–Pakistan border.

== Members of Parliament ==
=== 2018–2023: NA-127 Lahore-V ===
Election	Member	Party
2018	Ali Pervaiz Malik	PML (N)

=== 2024–present: NA-119 Lahore-III ===
Election	Member	Party
2024	Maryam Nawaz	PML(N)
By-election 2024	Ali Pervaiz Malik	PML(N)

== Election 2002 ==
General elections were held on 10 October 2002. Javed Hashmi of PML-N won by 30,372 votes.

General election 2002: NA-123 Lahore-VI
Party	Candidate	Votes	%	±%
PML(N)	Makhdoom Muhammad Javed Hashmi	30,372	45.46	
PPP	Tariq Waheed Butt	19,591	29.33	
PML(Q)	Mian Abdul Waheed	9,579	14.34	
PTI	Muhammad Saeed Arain	2,757	4.13	
NA	Ahsan Sheikh	2,375	2.56	
Others	Others (three candidates)	2,131	4.18	
Turnout		67,851	25.80	
Total valid votes		66,805	98.46	
Rejected ballots		1,046	1.54	
Majority		10,781	16.13	
Registered electors		262,987		

== Election 2008 ==
General elections were held on 18 February 2008. Javed Hashmi of PML-N won by 67,707 votes.

General election 2008: NA-123 Lahore-VI
Party	Candidate	Votes	%	±%
PML(N)	Makhdoom Muhammad Javed Hashmi	67,707	70.24	
Independent	Mian Aziz Ur Rehman Chann	18,807	19.51	
Independent	Mian Ikhlaq Ahmed Gudoo	7,843	8.14	
Others	Others (eight candidates)	2,010	2.11	
Turnout		97,697	33.81	
Total valid votes		96,367	98.64	
Rejected ballots		1,330	1.36	
Majority		48,900	50.73	
Registered electors		288,994		
PML(N) hold				

== Election 2013 ==
General elections were held on 11 May 2013. Muhammad Pervaiz Malik of PML-N won by 126,878 votes and became the member of National Assembly.

General election 2013: NA-123 Lahore-VI
Party	Candidate	Votes	%	±%
PML(N)	Muhammad Pervaiz Malik	126,878	73.05	
PTI	Atif Ch.	40,617	23.39	
Others	Others (twenty two candidates)	6,181	3.56	
Turnout		175,831	50.54	
Total valid votes		173,676	98.77	
Rejected ballots		2,155	1.23	
Majority		86,261	49.66	
Registered electors		347,941		
PML(N) hold				

== Election 2018 ==
General elections were held on 25 July 2018.

General election 2018: NA-127 Lahore-V
Party	Candidate	Votes	%	±%
PML(N)	Ali Pervaiz Malik	113,265	54.16	
PTI	Jamshed Iqbal Cheema	66,818	31.95	
Others	Others (seven candidates)	29,052	13.89	
Turnout		212,995	50.75	
Total valid votes		209,135	98.19	
Rejected ballots		3,860	1.81	
Majority		46,447	22.21	
Registered electors		419,706		
PML(N) hold		Swing	N/A	

== Election 2024 ==
General elections were held on 8 February 2024. Maryam Nawaz won the election with 83,856 votes but vacated the seat in favour of PP-159 Lahore-XV to become the Chief Minister of Punjab.

General election 2024: NA-119 Lahore-III
Party	Candidate	Votes	%	±%
PML(N)	Maryam Nawaz	83,856	42.59	▼11.57
PTI	Shahzad Farooq (Note: Filed nomination papers as PTI candidate but ECP allowed him to run as an Independent)	68,384	34.73	▲2.78
TLP	Muhammad Zaheer	30,530	15.51	▲4.45
Others	Others (seventeen candidates)	14,129	7.18	
Turnout		201,008	38.59	▼12.16
Total valid votes		196,899	97.96	
Rejected ballots		4,109	2.04	
Majority		15,472	7.86	▼14.35
Registered electors		520,829		
PML(N) hold				

== By-election 2024 ==
A by-election was held on 21 April 2024.

2024 Pakistani by-elections: NA-119 Lahore-III
Party	Candidate	Votes	%	±%
PML(N)	Ali Pervaiz Malik	61,086	61.25	▲18.66
SIC	Shahzad Farooq	34,197	33.74	
TLP	Muhammad Zaheer	4,748	4.68	▼10.83
Others	Others (six candidates)	336	0.33	
Turnout		101,363	19.12	▼19.47
Total valid votes		100,367	99.02	
Rejected ballots		996	0.98	
Majority		26,889	27.51	▲19.65
Registered electors		530,167		
PML(N) hold				

== See also ==
- NA-118 Lahore-II
- NA-120 Lahore-IV
