= Ali Pervaiz Malik =

Pakistani politician

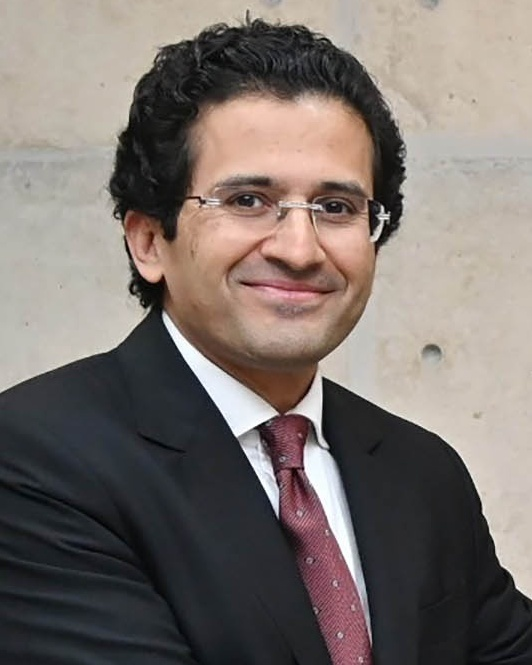

Federal Minister for Petroleum
- Incumbent
- Assumed office 7 March 2025
- President: Asif Ali Zardari
- Prime Minister: Shehbaz Sharif

Minister of State for Finance, Revenue, and Power
- In office 17 May 2024 – 7 March 2025
- President: Asif Ali Zardari
- Prime Minister: Shehbaz Sharif

Member of the National Assembly of Pakistan
- Incumbent
- Assumed office 29 April 2024
- Constituency: NA-119 Lahore-III
- In office 13 August 2018 – 10 August 2023
- Constituency: NA-119 Lahore-III

Personal details
- Born: Lahore, Punjab, Pakistan
- Party: PMLN (2018-present)
- Parents: Muhammad Pervaiz Malik (father); Shaista Pervaiz (mother)

Ali Pervaiz Malik is a Pakistani politician who is the current Federal Minister for Energy (Petroleum Division), and previously served as Minister of State for Finance, Revenue, and Power, in office since 17 May 2024. Previously, he had been a member of the National Assembly from August 2018 to August 2023.

== Political career ==
He was elected to the National Assembly of Pakistan from Constituency NA-127 (Lahore-V) as a candidate of Pakistan Muslim League (N) (PML-N) in the 2018 Pakistani general election.

He was re-elected to the National Assembly from Constituency NA-119 Lahore-III as a candidate of PML-N in by-election held in April 2024. On 17 May, he was inducted into the federal cabinet of Prime Minister Shehbaz Sharif and was appointed as Minister of State for Finance, Revenue, with additional ministerial portfolio of Power Division.
