= Aziz A. Munshi =

Pakistani politician

Abdul Aziz Abdullah Munshi (Urdu: عزیز احمد مُنشی) is a lawyer and former Attorney General of Pakistan for four terms.

Abdul Aziz Abdullah Munshi uses the shorter form Aziz A. Munshi and is a son of Mr. Abdullah Munshi who was a judge in Bombay, India and nephew of Prime Minister Ibrahim Ismail Chundrigar. Aziz A. Munshi started practising law in the year 1954 with his uncle I.I. Chundrigar in Karachi. Aziz A. Munshi has been practising law for over 60 years at his law firm, The Law Chambers of Aziz A. Munshi.
