= Shaista Pervaiz =

Pakistani politician

Member of the National Assembly of Pakistan
- Incumbent
- Assumed office 29 February 2024
- Constituency: Reserved seat for women
- In office 13 January 2022 – 10 August 2023
- Preceded by: Pervaiz Malik
- Constituency: NA-133 (Lahore-XI)
- In office 13 August 2018 – 25 October 2021
- Constituency: Reserved seat for women
- In office 1 June 2013 – 31 May 2018
- Constituency: Reserved seat for women

Personal details
- Party: PMLN (2013-present)
- Spouse: Muhammad Pervaiz Malik (died 2021)
- Children: Ali Pervaiz Malik (son)

Shaista Pervaiz Malik (Urdu: شائستہ پرویز ملک) is a Pakistani politician. She served as a member of the National Assembly of Pakistan from December 2021 until August 2023. She previously served as a member of the National Assembly from June 2013 to May 2018 and from August 2018 to October 2021.

== Political career ==
She was elected to the National Assembly of Pakistan as a candidate of Pakistan Muslim League (N) (PML-N) on a seat reserved for women from Punjab in the 2013 Pakistani general election.

She was re-elected to the National Assembly as a candidate of PML-N on a reserved seat for women from Punjab in the 2018 Pakistani general election. She vacated seat in October 2021 to contest NA 133 by elections.

She contested NA-133 by polls held on 5 December 2021 and won by margins of 14,498 defeating PPP Aslam Gill.
