= Mansoor Usman Awan =

Pakistani lawyer

Malik Mansoor Usman Awan
- منصور عثمان اعوان

37th Attorney-General for Pakistan
- Incumbent
- Assumed office 27 March 2023
- President: Arif Alvi; Asif Ali Zardari
- Prime Minister: Shehbaz Sharif; Anwar ul Haq Kakar; Shehbaz Sharif
- Preceded by: Shehzad Ata Elahi

Personal details
- Born: Multan, Pakistan
- Education: Harvard Law School, US; University of the Punjab, Pakistan
- Occupation: Lawyer

Mansoor Usman Awan (Urdu: منصور عثمان اعوان) is a Pakistani lawyer who is currently serving as the 37th Attorney General for Pakistan, in office since 23 December 2022. In a number of cases, such as the implementation of Article 95 and the presidential reference on the interpretation of Article 63(A) of the Constitution of Pakistan, he served as the Supreme Court Bar Association's (SCBA) legal representative.

== Early life and education ==
Mansoor Awan was born in Lahore, Pakistan. He did his intermediate from Cadet College Hasanabdal. He graduated and secured a top position in his class of Bachelor of Laws (LLB) at the Punjab University Law College, Lahore, Pakistan, and went on to get a Master of Laws (LLM) from Harvard Law School in the United States. He received the Charles Earl Bevan Petman Law Prize and the Justice M. Jan Memorial gold medal for securing first place in jurisprudence and criminal law, respectively.

Awan also received the Dean's Award for Leadership from Harvard Law School in 2005. He served as the Vice President of the Harvard Graduate Council in addition to being chosen as the LLM representative to the Harvard Law School Council while attending Harvard Law School.

Legal offices
Preceded by Ashtar Ausaf Ali	Attorney-General for Pakistan; 27 March 2023	Succeeded by
