= NA-120 Lahore-IV =

Constituency of the National Assembly of Pakistan

- Constituency for the National Assembly of Pakistan
- Region: Lahore City area (partly), Wagha town, Manhala Road and Barki Road of Lahore District
- Electorate: 363,045

Current constituency
- Party: Pakistan Muslim League (N)
- Member: Ayaz Sadiq
- Created from: NA-123 Lahore-VI

NA-120 Lahore-IV ( این اے-120، لاہور-4) is a constituency for the National Assembly of Pakistan.

== Members of Parliament ==
=== 2018–2023: NA-129 Lahore-VII ===
Election	Member	Party
2018	Ayaz Sadiq	PML (N)

=== 2024–present: NA-120 Lahore-IV ===
Election	Member	Party
2024	Ayaz Sadiq	PML (N)

== 2002 election ==
General elections were held on 10 October 2002. Javed Hashmi of PML-N won by 30,372 votes.

General election 2002: NA-123 Lahore-VI
Party	Candidate	Votes	%	±%
PML(N)	Makhdoom Muhammad Javed Hashmi	30,372	45.46	
PPP	Tariq Waheed Butt	19,591	29.33	
PML(Q)	Mian Abdul Waheed	9,579	14.34	
PTI	Muhammad Saeed Arain	2,757	4.13	
NA	Ahsan Sheikh	2,375	2.56	
Others	Others (three candidates)	2,131	4.18	
Turnout		67,851	25.80	
Total valid votes		66,805	98.46	
Rejected ballots		1,046	1.54	
Majority		10,781	16.13	
Registered electors		262,987		

== 2008 election ==
General elections were held on 18 February 2008. Javed Hashmi of PML-N won by 67,707 votes.

General election 2008: NA-123 Lahore-VI
Party	Candidate	Votes	%	±%
PML(N)	Makhdoom Muhammad Javed Hashmi	67,707	70.24	
Independent	Mian Aziz Ur Rehman Chann	18,807	19.51	
Independent	Mian Ikhlaq Ahmed Gudoo	7,843	8.14	
Others	Others (eight candidates)	2,010	2.11	
Turnout		97,697	33.81	
Total valid votes		96,367	98.64	
Rejected ballots		1,330	1.36	
Majority		48,900	50.73	
Registered electors		288,994		
PML(N) hold				

== 2010 by-election ==
By-Election 2010: NA-123 Lahore-VI
Party	Candidate	Votes	%	±%
PML(N)	Mohammad Pervaiz Malik	44,146	75.51	
Independent	Mian Hamid Miraj	9,192	15.72	
Independent	Hafiz Salman Butt	3,257	5.57	
Others	Others (fifty four candidates)	1,873	3.20	
Turnout		58,468	20.31	
Total valid votes		58,468	100	
Rejected ballots		0	0	
Majority		34,954	59.79	
Registered electors		287,915		
PML(N) hold				

== 2013 election ==
General elections were held on 11 May 2013. Muhammad Pervaiz Malik of PML-N won by 126,878 votes and became the member of National Assembly.

General election 2013: NA-123 Lahore-VI
Party	Candidate	Votes	%	±%
PML(N)	Muhammad Pervaiz Malik	126,878	73.05	
PTI	Atif Ch.	40,617	23.39	
Others	Others (twenty-two candidates)	6,181	3.56	
Turnout		175,831	50.54	
Total valid votes		173,676	98.77	
Rejected ballots		2,155	1.23	
Majority		86,261	49.66	
Registered electors		347,941		
PML(N) hold				

== 2018 election ==
General elections were held on 25 July 2018.

General election 2018: NA-129 Lahore-VII
Party	Candidate	Votes	%	±%
PML(N)	Ayaz Sadiq	103,021	47.98	
PTI	Aleem Khan	94,879	44.19	
Others	Others (nine candidates)	16,805	7.83	
Turnout		218,414	53.96	
Total valid votes		214,705	98.30	
Rejected ballots		3,709	1.70	
Majority		8,142	3.79	
Registered electors		404,802		
PML(N) hold		Swing	N/A	

== 2024 elections ==
General elections were held on 8 February 2024. Ayaz Sadiq won the election with 68,037 votes.

General election 2024: NA-120 Lahore-IV
Party	Candidate	Votes	%	±%
PML(N)	Ayaz Sadiq	68,037	42.58	▼5.40
PTI	Usman Hamza (Note: Filed nomination papers as PTI candidate but ECP allowed him to run as an Independent)	49,309	30.86	▼13.33
TLP	Rashid Ali	24,166	15.12	▲9.12
Others	Others (twenty-two candidates)	18,273	11.44	
Turnout		163,173	44.95	▼9.01
Total valid votes		159,785	97.92	
Rejected ballots		3,388	2.08	
Majority		18,728	11.72	▲7.93
Registered electors		363,045		
PML(N) hold		Swing	N/A	

== See also ==
- NA-119 Lahore-III
- NA-121 Lahore-V
