= NA-227 Dadu-I =

Constituency of the National Assembly of Pakistan

- Constituency for the National Assembly of Pakistan
- Region: Khairpur Nathan Shah and Mehar Tehsils of Dadu District
- Electorate: 479,411

Current constituency
- Party: Pakistan People's Party
- Member(s): Irfan Zafar Leghari
- Created from: NA-233 Dadu-III

NA-227 Dadu-I (این اے-227، دادُو-1) is a constituency for the National Assembly of Pakistan.

== Assembly Segments ==
| Constituency number | Constituency | District | Current MPA | Party |
|---|---|---|---|---|
| 80 | PS-80 Dadu-I | Dadu District | Zubair Ahmed Junejo | PPP |
| 81 | PS-81 Dadu-II | Dadu District | Fayaz Ali Butt | PPP |

== Members of Parliament ==
=== 2018–2023: NA-234 Dadu-I ===
| Election | Member | Party |
|---|---|---|
| 2018 | Irfan Zafar Leghari | PPPP |

=== 2024–present: NA-227 Dadu-I ===
| Election | Member | Party |
|---|---|---|
| 2024 | Irfan Zafar Leghari | PPPP |

== Election 2002 ==
General elections were held on 10 October 2002. Liaqat Ali Jatoi of PML-Q won by 62,388 votes.

General election 2002: NA-233 Dadu-III
| Party | Candidate | Votes | % | ±% |
|---|---|---|---|---|
| PML(Q) | Liaqat Ali Jatoi | 62,388 | 54.04 | |
| PPP | Rafique Ahmed Mahessar | 52,784 | 45.72 | |
| Independent | Talat Iqbal Mahessar | 269 | 0.24 | |
| Turnout | | 117,270 | 35.55 | |
| Total valid votes | | 115,441 | 98.44 | |
| Rejected ballots | | 1,829 | 1.56 | |
| Majority | | 9,604 | 8.32 | |
| Registered electors | | 329,858 | | |

== Election 2008 ==
General elections were held on 18 February 2008. Talat Iqbal Mahesar of PPP won by 83,493 votes.

General election 2008: NA-233 Dadu-III
| Party | Candidate | Votes | % | ±% |
|---|---|---|---|---|
| PPP | Talat Iqbal Mahessar | 83,493 | 62.28 | |
| PML(Q) | Ihsan Ali Jatoi | 50,146 | 37.40 | |
| Others | Others (eight candidates) | 432 | 0.32 | |
| Turnout | | 137,061 | 31.26 | |
| Total valid votes | | 134,071 | 97.82 | |
| Rejected ballots | | 2,990 | 2.18 | |
| Majority | | 33,347 | 24.88 | |
| Registered electors | | 438,433 | | |
| PPP gain from PML(Q) | | | | |

== Election 2013 ==
General elections were held on 11 May 2013. Imran Zafar Leghari of PPP won by 110,292 votes and became the member of National Assembly.

General election 2013: NA-233 Dadu-III
| Party | Candidate | Votes | % | ±% |
|---|---|---|---|---|
| PPP | Imran Zafar Leghari | 110,292 | 61.37 | |
| PML(N) | Liaquat Ali Jatoi | 65,181 | 36.27 | |
| PML(F) | Syed Safdar Ali Shah | 2,571 | 1.43 | |
| Others | Others (eleven candidates) | 1,675 | 0.93 | |
| Turnout | | 188,561 | 60.81 | |
| Total valid votes | | 179,719 | 95.31 | |
| Rejected ballots | | 8,842 | 4.69 | |
| Majority | | 45,111 | 25.10 | |
| Registered electors | | 310,078 | | |
| PPP hold | | | | |

== Election 2018 ==
General elections were held on 25 July 2018.

General election 2018: NA-234 Dadu-I
| Party | Candidate | Votes | % | ±% |
|---|---|---|---|---|
| PPP | Irfan Zafar Leghari | 96,038 | 52.84 | |
| PTI | Liaquat Ali Jatoi | 82,730 | 45.52 | |
| Others | Others (four candidates) | 2,995 | 1.64 | |
| Turnout | | 188,334 | 50.41 | |
| Total valid votes | | 181,763 | 96.51 | |
| Rejected ballots | | 6,571 | 3.49 | |
| Majority | | 13,308 | 7.32 | |
| Registered electors | | 373,589 | | |
| PPP hold | | Swing | N/A | |

== Election 2024 ==
Elections were held on 8 February 2024. Irfan Zafar Leghari won the election with 104,141 votes.

General election 2024: NA-227 Dadu-I
| Party | Candidate | Votes | % | ±% |
|---|---|---|---|---|
| PPP | Irfan Ali Leghari | 104,141 | 50.74 | ▼2.10 |
| GDA | Liaquat Ali Jatoi | 94,877 | 46.23 | |
| Others | Others (ten candidates) | 6,208 | 3.02 | |
| Turnout | | 214,308 | 44.70 | ▼5.71 |
| Total valid votes | | 205,226 | 95.76 | |
| Rejected ballots | | 9,082 | 4.24 | |
| Majority | | 9,264 | 4.51 | ▼2.81 |
| Registered electors | | 479,411 | | |
| PPP hold | | | | |

== See also ==
- NA-226 Jamshoro
- NA-228 Dadu-II
