= Imran Zafar Leghari =

Pakistani politician

Member of the National Assembly of Pakistan
- In office 1 June 2013 – 31 May 2018
- Constituency: NA-233 (Dadu-III)

Personal details
- Born: 29 October 1979 (age 46) Dadu
- Party: Pakistan Peoples Party
- Relations: Irfan Zafar Leghari (brother)

Imran Zafar Leghari (Urdu: عمران ظفر لغاری; born 29 October 1979) is a Pakistani politician who had been a member of the National Assembly of Pakistan from June 2013 to May 2018. Previously, he had been a member of the Provincial Assembly of Sindh from 2008 to 2013.

== Early life ==
He was born on 29 October 1979 in Dadu.

He had done Bachelor of Arts from the University of Sindh and received the degree of Bachelor of Arts in Marketing and Human Resource Management from the University of Hertfordshire.

== Political career ==
He was elected to the Provincial Assembly of Sindh as a candidate of Pakistan Peoples Party (PPP) from Constituency PS-76 (Dadu-VI) in the 2008 Pakistani general election. He received 33,578 votes and defeated Haji Amir Bux Junejo.

He was elected to the National Assembly of Pakistan as a candidate of PPP from Constituency NA-233 (Dadu-III) in the 2013 Pakistani general election. He received 110,292 votes and defeated Liaquat Ali Jatoi.
