= Islam in Pakistan =

Pakistani Muslims پاکستانی مسلمان
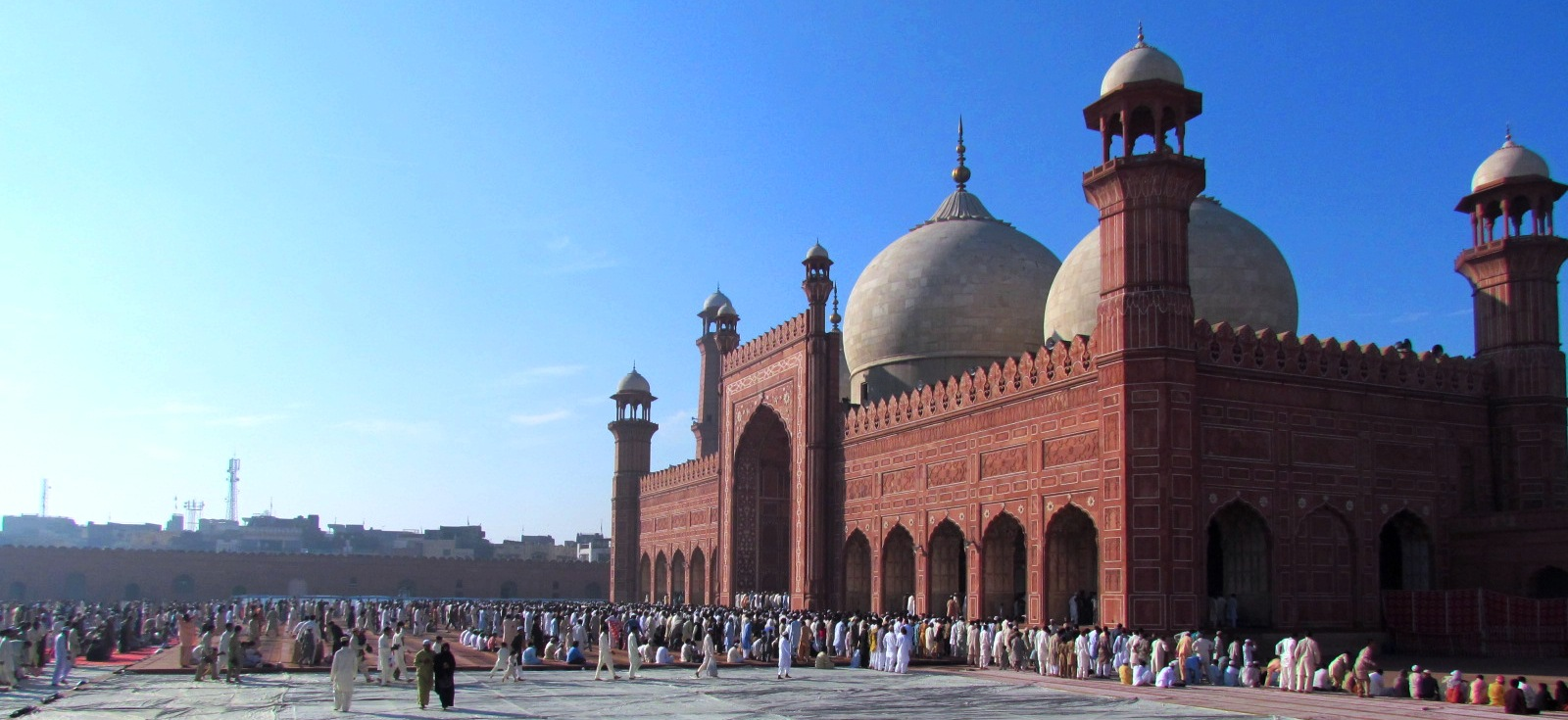
- Eid prayer at the Badshahi Mosque in Lahore

Total population
- c. 231.69 million (2023 census) (96.35% of the population)

Regions with significant populations
- Throughout Pakistan

Religions
- 85–90% Sunni Muslims; 10–15% Shia Muslims

Languages
- Pakistani languages

Islam in Pakistan
1. Sunni Muslims (90.0%)
2. Shia Muslims (10.0%)

Islam is the largest and the state religion of the Islamic Republic of Pakistan. The country has over 231.69 million adherents of Islam, (Note: excluding the administrative territory of Azad Kashmir and Gilgit Baltistan) making it the world's second-largest country by Muslim population (only second to Indonesia). 85–90% of Pakistanis follow Sunni Islam (primarily the Hanafi school of jurisprudence), with 10–15% following Shia Islam.

About 97% of Pakistanis are Muslims. The majority are Sunni (85–90%) while Shias make up around 10-15%. Smaller minority Muslim populations in Pakistan include Quranists, nondenominational Muslims. There are also two Mahdi'ist based creeds practised in Pakistan, namely Mahdavia and Ahmadiyya, the latter of whom are considered by the constitution of Pakistan to be non-Muslims; they jointly constitute less than 1% of the population.

== History ==
=== Before independence ===
Islam had reached the Indian subcontinent during the lifetime of Muhammad. According to a tradition, Baba Ratan Hindi was a trader from Punjab who was one of the non-Arab companions of Muhammad. In 644 AD, the Rashidun Caliphate conquered the coast of Makran after defeating the kingdom of Sindh in the battle of Rasil. According to Derryl N. Maclean, a link between Sindh and early partisans of Ali or proto-Shi'ites can be traced to Hakim ibn Jabalah al-Abdi who traveled across Sindh to Makran in the year 649 AD and presented a report on the area to the Caliph. During the Caliphate of Ali, Sindhi Hindus had come under influence of Islam and some even participated in the Battle of Camel. In 712 CE, the Umayyad Caliphate, under an Arab general Muhammad bin Qasim, conquered most of the Indus region and Takshashila (present-day Taxila) for the caliphate, to be made the "As-Sindh" province with its capital at Al-Mansurah. The Pakistan government's official chronology claims this as the time when the foundation of Pakistan was laid. By the end of the 10th century CE, the region was ruled by several Hindu Shahi kings who would be subdued by the Ghaznavids.

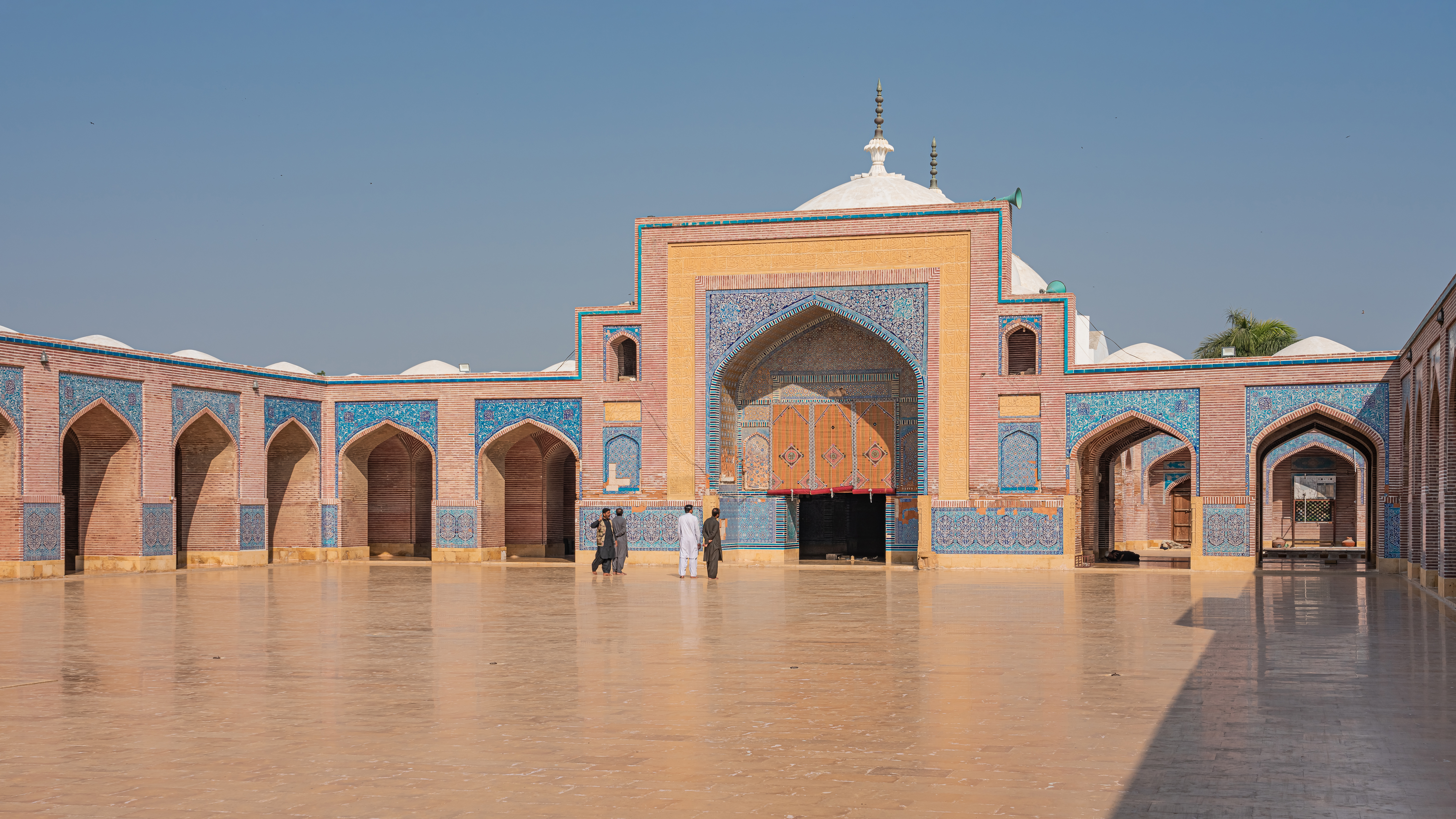
Shah Jahan Mosque, Thatta was patronized by the Mughal Emperor Shah Jahan.

The early medieval period (642–1219 CE) witnessed the spread of Islam in the region and Takshashila was an important city for the religion in South Asia. During this period, Sufi missionaries played a pivotal role in converting a majority of the regional Buddhist and Hindu population to Islam. These developments set the stage for the rule of several successive Muslim empires in the region, including the Ghaznavid Empire (975–1187 CE), the Ghorid Kingdom, and the Delhi Sultanate (1206–1526 CE). The Lodi dynasty, the last of the Delhi Sultanate, was replaced by the Mughal Empire (1526–1857 CE).

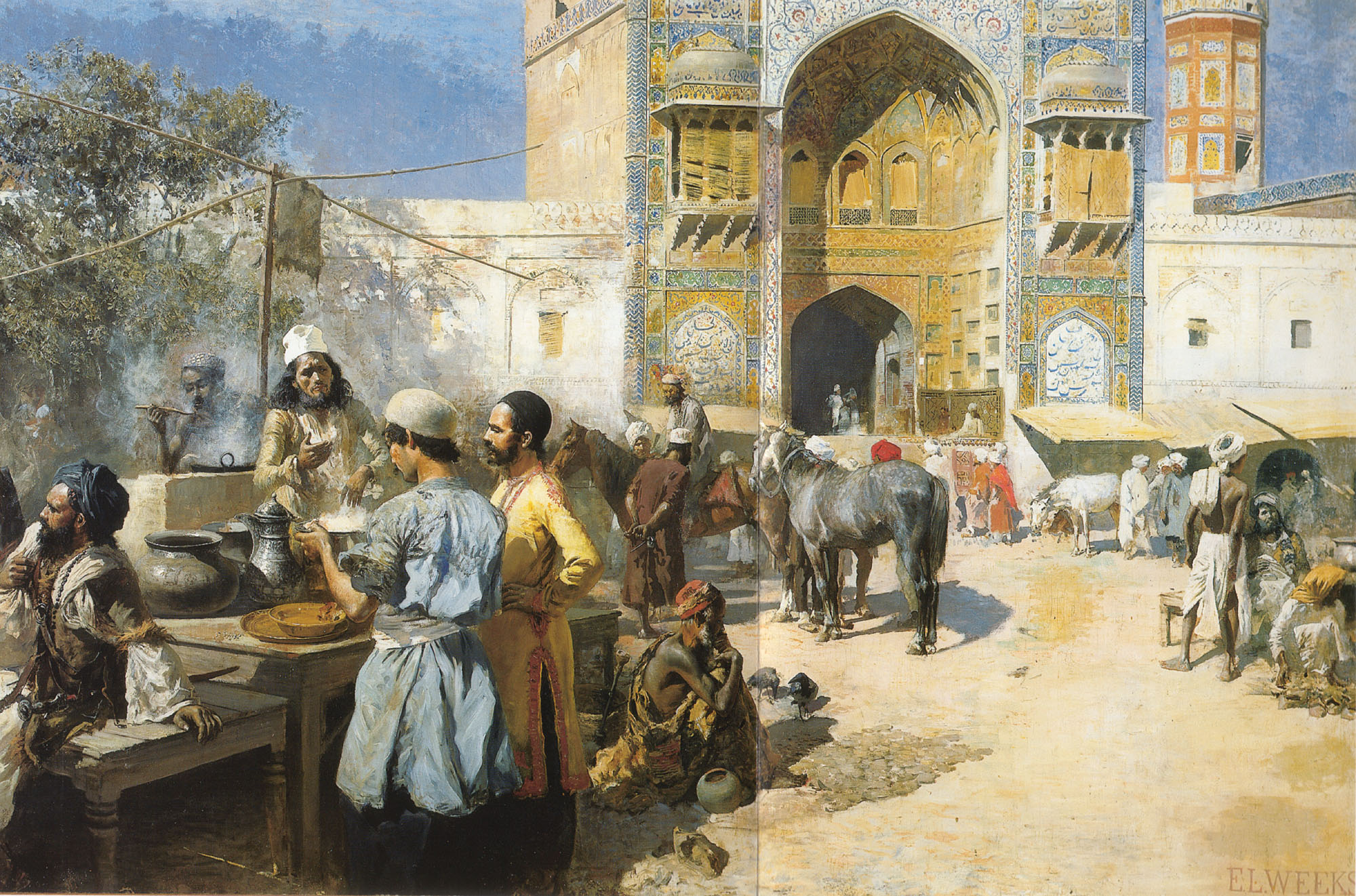
A painting by Edwin Lord Weeks c. 1889 of the marketplace near Wazir Khan Mosque

=== In independent Pakistan ===
==== Nature of state ====
The Muslim League leadership, ulama (Islamic clergy) and Jinnah had articulated their vision of Pakistan in terms of an Islamic state. Muhammad Ali Jinnah had developed a close association with the ulama. When Jinnah died, Islamic scholar Maulana Shabbir Ahmad Usmani described Jinnah as the greatest Muslim after the Mughal Emperor Aurangzeb and also compared Jinnah's death to the Muhammad's passing. Usmani asked Pakistanis to remember Jinnah's message of Unity, Faith and Discipline and work to fulfil his dream:

to create a solid bloc of all Muslim states from Karachi to Ankara, from Pakistan to Morocco. He [Jinnah] wanted to see the Muslims of the world united under the banner of Islam as an effective check against the aggressive designs of their enemies.

The first formal step taken to transform Pakistan into an ideological Islamic state was in March 1949 when the country's first Prime Minister, Liaquat Ali Khan, introduced the Objectives Resolution in the Constituent Assembly. The Objectives Resolution declared that sovereignty over the entire universe belongs to God. The president of the Muslim League, Chaudhry Khaliquzzaman, announced that Pakistan would bring together all Muslim countries into Islamistan-a pan-Islamic entity. Khaliq believed that Pakistan was only a Muslim state and was not yet an Islamic state, but that it could certainly become an Islamic state after bringing all believers of Islam into a single political unit. Keith Callard, one of the earliest scholars on Pakistani politics, observed that Pakistanis believed in the essential unity of purpose and outlook in the Muslim world:

Pakistan was founded to advance the cause of Muslims. Other Muslims might have been expected to be sympathetic, even enthusiastic. But this assumed that other Muslim states would take the same view of the relation between religion and nationality.

However, Pakistan's pan-Islamist sentiments were not shared by other Muslim governments at the time. Nationalism in other parts of the Muslim world was based on ethnicity, language and culture. Although Muslim governments were unsympathetic with Pakistan's pan-Islamic aspirations, Islamists from all over the world were drawn to Pakistan. Figures such as the Grand Mufti of Palestine, Al-Haj Amin al-Husseini, and leaders of Islamist political movements, such as the Muslim Brotherhood, became frequent visitors to the country. After General Zia-ul-Haq took power in a military coup, Hizb ut-Tahrir (an Islamist group calling for the establishment of a Caliphate) expanded its organisational network and activities in Pakistan. Its founder, Taqi al-Din al-Nabhani, would maintain regular correspondence with Abul A’la Maududi, the founder of Jamaat-e-Islami (JI), and he also urged Dr. Israr Ahmed to continue his work in Pakistan for the establishment of a global caliphate.

Social scientist Nasim Ahmad Jawed conducted a survey in 1969 in pre-divided Pakistan on the type of national identity that was used by educated professional people. He found that over 60% of people in East Pakistan (modern day Bangladesh) professed to have a secular national identity. However, in West Pakistan (current day Pakistan) the same figure professed to have an Islamic and not a secular identity. Furthermore, the same figure in East Pakistan defined their identity in terms of their ethnicity and not Islam. It was the opposite in West Pakistan, where Islam was stated to be more important than ethnicity.

After Pakistan's first ever general elections the 1973 Constitution was created by an elected Parliament. The Constitution declared Pakistan an Islamic Republic and Islam as the state religion. It also stated that all laws would have to be brought into accordance with the injunctions of Islam as laid down in the Quran and Sunnah and that no law repugnant to such injunctions could be enacted. The 1973 Constitution also created certain institutions such as the Shariat Court and the Council of Islamic Ideology to channel the interpretation and application of Islam.

==== Zia ul Haq's Islamization ====
On 5 July 1977, General Zia-ul-Haq led a coup d'état. In the year or two before Zia-ul-Haq's coup, his predecessor, leftist Prime Minister Zulfikar Ali Bhutto, had faced vigorous opposition which was united under the revivalist banner of Nizam-e-Mustafa ("Rule of the prophet"). According to supporters of the movement, establishing an Islamic state based on sharia law would mean a return to the justice and success of the early days of Islam when Muhammad ruled the Muslims. In an effort to stem the tide of street Islamisation, Bhutto had also called for it and banned the drinking and selling of wine by Muslims, nightclubs and horse racing.

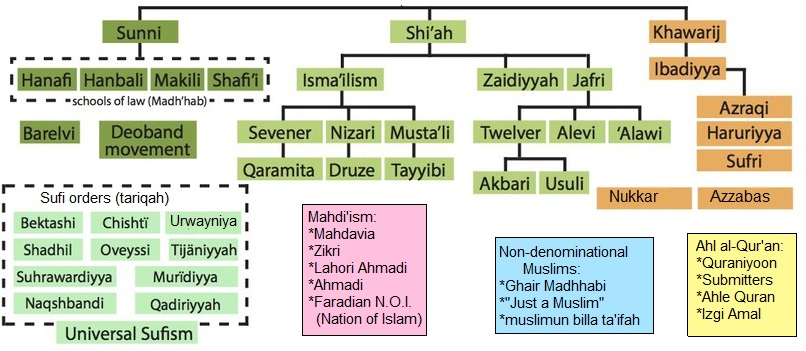
Many diverse Islamic denominations are practised within Pakistan.

"Islamisation" was the "primary" policy, or "centerpiece" of his government. Zia-ul-Haq committed himself to establishing an Islamic state and enforcing sharia law. Zia established separate Shariat judicial courts and court benches to judge legal cases using Islamic doctrine. New criminal offences (of adultery, fornication, and types of blasphemy), and new punishments (of whipping, amputation, and stoning to death), were added to Pakistani law. Interest payments for bank accounts were replaced by "profit and loss" payments. Zakat charitable donations became a 2.5% annual tax. School textbooks and libraries were overhauled to remove un-Islamic material. Offices, schools, and factories were required to offer praying space. Zia bolstered the influence of the ulama (Islamic clergy) and the Islamic parties, whilst conservative scholars became fixtures on television. 10,000s of activists from the Jamaat-e-Islami party were appointed to government posts to ensure the continuation of his agenda after his passing. Conservative ulama (Islamic scholars) were added to the Council of Islamic Ideology. Separate electorates for Hindus and Christians were established in 1985 even though Christian and Hindu leaders complained that they felt excluded from the county's political process.

Zia's state sponsored Islamization increased sectarian divisions in Pakistan between Sunnis and Shias and between Deobandis and Barelvis. A solid majority of Barelvis had supported the creation of Pakistan, and Barelvi ulama had also issued fatwas in support of the Pakistan Movement during the 1946 elections, but ironically Islamic state politics in Pakistan was mostly in favour of Deobandi (and later Ahl-e-Hadith/Salafi) institutions. This was despite the fact that only a few (although influential) Deobandi clerics had supported the Pakistan Movement. Zia-ul-Haq forged a strong alliance between the military and Deobandi institutions. In Pakistan, actors who have been identified by the state as moderate Sufis—such as the Barelwis, a movement founded in the 19th century in response to conservative reformers such as the Deobandis—mobilized after the government's call from 2009 onwards to save the soul of Pakistan from creeping “Talibanization.”

Possible motivations for the Islamization programme included Zia's personal piety (most accounts agree that he came from a religious family), desire to gain political allies, to "fulfill Pakistan's raison d'être" as a Muslim state, and/or the political need to legitimise what was seen by some Pakistanis as his "repressive, un-representative martial law regime".

Until the government of General Muhammad Zia-ul-Haq, "Islamic activists" were frustrated by the lack of "teeth" to enforce Islamic law in Pakistan's constitution. For example, in the 1956 constitution, the state did not enforce "Islamic moral standards" but "endeavor[ed]" to make them compulsory and to "prevent" prostitution, gambling, consumption of alcoholic liquor, etc. Interest was to be eliminated "as soon as possible".

According to Shajeel Zaidi a million people attended Zia ul Haq's funeral because he had given them what they wanted: more religion. A PEW opinion poll found that 84% of Pakistanis favoured making Sharia the official law of the land. According to the 2013 Pew Research Center report, the majority of Pakistani Muslims also support the death penalty for those who leave Islam (62%). In contrast, support for the death penalty for those who leave Islam was only 36% in fellow South Asian Muslim country Bangladesh (which shared heritage with Pakistan). A 2010 opinion poll by PEW Research Centre also found that 87% of Pakistanis considered themselves 'Muslims first' rather than a member of their nationality. This was the highest figure amongst all Muslim populations surveyed. In contrast only 67% in Jordan, 59% in Egypt, 51% in Turkey, 36% in Indonesia and 71% in Nigeria considered themselves as 'Muslim first' rather than a member of their own nationality.

"Islamic activists" such as much or the ulama (Islamic clerics) and Jamaat-e-Islami (Islamist party), support the expansion of "Islamic law and Islamic practices". "Islamic Modernists" are lukewarm to this expansion and "some may even advocate development along the secularist lines of the West."

=== Islamic way of life ===
The mosque is an important religious as well as social institution in Pakistan. Many rituals and ceremonies are celebrated according to Islamic calendar.

== Demographics ==
Muslim population in Pakistan
Year	Pop.	±% p.a.
1901	14,022,544	—
1911	14,966,846	+0.65%
1921	15,203,501	+0.16%
1931	17,557,877	+1.45%
1941	21,113,214	+1.86%
1951	32,731,582	+4.48%
1961	41,666,153	+2.44%
1972	60,434,659	+3.44%
1981	81,450,057	+3.37%
1998	127,433,409	+2.67%
2017	200,362,718	+2.41%
2023	231,686,709	+2.45%
Source: (Note: 1901 figure taken from census data by combining the total population of all administrative divisions that compose the region of contemporary Pakistan, including Punjab, (Note: 1901 figure taken from census data by combining the total population of all districts (Lahore, Sialkot, Gujranwala, Gujrat, Shahpur, Jhelum, Rawalpindi, Mianwali, Montgomery, Lyallpur (inscribed as the Chenab Colony on the 1901 census), Jhang, Multan, Muzaffargargh, Dera Ghazi Khan), one tehsil (Shakargarh – then part of Gurdaspur District), one princely state (Bahawalpur), and one tract (Biloch Trans–Frontier) in Punjab Province, British India that ultimately fell on the western side of the Radcliffe Line. See 1901 census data here: Immediately following the partition of India in 1947, these districts and tract would ultimately make up the subdivision of West Punjab, which also later included Bahawalpur. The state that makes up this region in the contemporary era is Punjab, Pakistan.) Sindh, (Note: 1901 figure taken from census data by combining the total population of all districts (Karachi, Hyderabad, Shikarpur, Tharparkar, Upper Sind Frontier), and one princely state (Khairpur), in Sindh Province, British India. See 1901 census data here:) Khyber Pakhtunkhwa, Balochistan, Azad Kashmir, (Note: 1901 figure taken from census data by combining the total population of two districts (Bhimber and Muzaffarabad) and one Jagir (Poonch) in the Princely State of Jammu and Kashmir that ultimately would be administered by Pakistan, in the contemporary self-administrative territory of Azad Kashmir. See 1901 census data here:) and Gilgit–Baltistan. (Note: 1901 figure taken from census data using the total population of Gilgit District in the Princely State of Jammu and Kashmir that ultimately would be administered by Pakistan, in the contemporary administrative territory of Gilgit–Baltistan. See 1901 census data here:)) (Note: 1911 figure taken from census data by combining the total population of all administrative divisions that compose the region of contemporary Pakistan, including Punjab, (Note: 1911 figure taken from census data by combining the total population of all districts (Lahore, Sialkot, Gujranwala, Gujrat, Shahpur, Jhelum, Rawalpindi, Attock, Mianwali, Montgomery, Lyallpur, Jhang, Multan, Muzaffargargh, Dera Ghazi Khan), one tehsil (Shakargarh – then part of Gurdaspur District), one princely state (Bahawalpur), and one tract (Biloch Trans–Frontier) in Punjab Province, British India that ultimately fell on the western side of the Radcliffe Line. See 1911 census data here: Immediately following the partition of India in 1947, these districts and tract would ultimately make up the subdivision of West Punjab, which also later included Bahawalpur. The state that makes up this region in the contemporary era is Punjab, Pakistan.) Sindh, (Note: 1911 figure taken from census data by combining the total population of all districts (Hyderabad, Karachi, Larkana, Sukkur, Tharparkar, Upper Sind Frontier), and one princely state (Khairpur), in Sindh Province, British India. See 1911 census data here:) Khyber Pakhtunkhwa, Balochistan, Azad Kashmir, (Note: 1911 figure taken from census data by combining the total population of two districts (Mirpur and Muzaffarabad) and one Jagir (Poonch) in the Princely State of Jammu and Kashmir that ultimately would be administered by Pakistan, in the contemporary self-administrative territory of Azad Kashmir. See 1911 census data here:) and Gilgit–Baltistan. (Note: 1911 figure taken from census data by combining the total population of Gilgit District and the Frontier Ilaqas in the Princely State of Jammu and Kashmir that ultimately would be administered by Pakistan, in the contemporary administrative territory of Gilgit–Baltistan. See 1911 census data here:)) (Note: 1921 figure taken from census data by combining the total population of all administrative divisions that compose the region of contemporary Pakistan, including Punjab, (Note: 1921 figure taken from census data by combining the total population of all districts (Lahore, Sialkot, Gujranwala, Sheikhupura, Gujrat, Shahpur, Jhelum, Rawalpindi, Attock, Mianwali, Montgomery, Lyallpur, Jhang, Multan, Muzaffargargh, Dera Ghazi Khan), one tehsil (Shakargarh – then part of Gurdaspur District), one princely state (Bahawalpur), and one tract (Biloch Trans–Frontier) in Punjab Province, British India that ultimately fell on the western side of the Radcliffe Line. See 1921 census data here: Immediately following the partition of India in 1947, these districts and tract would ultimately make up the subdivision of West Punjab, which also later included Bahawalpur. The state that makes up this region in the contemporary era is Punjab, Pakistan.) Sindh, (Note: 1921 figure taken from census data by combining the total population of all districts (Hyderabad, Karachi, Larkana, Nawabshah, Sukkur, Tharparkar, Upper Sind Frontier), and one princely state (Khairpur), in Sindh Province, British India. See 1921 census data here:) Khyber Pakhtunkhwa, Balochistan, Azad Kashmir, (Note: 1921 figure taken from census data by combining the total population of two districts (Mirpur and Muzaffarabad) and one Jagir (Poonch) in the Princely State of Jammu and Kashmir that ultimately would be administered by Pakistan, in the contemporary self-administrative territory of Azad Kashmir. See 1921 census data here:) and Gilgit–Baltistan. (Note: 1921 figure taken from census data by combining the total population of Gilgit District and the Frontier Ilaqas in the Princely State of Jammu and Kashmir that ultimately would be administered by Pakistan, in the contemporary administrative territory of Gilgit–Baltistan. See 1921 census data here:)) (Note: 1931 figure taken from census data by combining the total population of all administrative divisions that compose the region of contemporary Pakistan, including Punjab, (Note: 1931 figure taken from census data by combining the total population of all districts (Lahore, Sialkot, Gujranwala, Sheikhupura, Gujrat, Shahpur, Jhelum, Rawalpindi, Attock, Mianwali, Montgomery, Lyallpur, Jhang, Multan, Muzaffargargh, Dera Ghazi Khan), one tehsil (Shakargarh – then part of Gurdaspur District), one princely state (Bahawalpur), and one tract (Biloch Trans–Frontier) in Punjab Province, British India that ultimately fell on the western side of the Radcliffe Line. See 1931 census data here: Immediately following the partition of India in 1947, these districts and tract would ultimately make up the subdivision of West Punjab, which also later included Bahawalpur. The state that makes up this region in the contemporary era is Punjab, Pakistan.) Sindh, (Note: 1931 figure taken from census data by combining the total population of all districts (Hyderabad, Karachi, Larkana, Nawabshah, Sukkur, Tharparkar, Upper Sind Frontier), and one princely state (Khairpur), in Sindh Province, British India. See 1931 census data here:) Khyber Pakhtunkhwa, Balochistan, Azad Kashmir, (Note: 1941 figure taken from census data by combining the total population of two districts (Mirpur and Muzaffarabad) and one Jagir (Poonch) in the Princely State of Jammu and Kashmir that ultimately would be administered by Pakistan, in the contemporary self-administrative territory of Azad Kashmir. See 1941 census data here:) and Gilgit–Baltistan. (Note: 1931 figure taken from census data by combining the total population of Gilgit District and the Frontier Ilaqas in the Princely State of Jammu and Kashmir that ultimately would be administered by Pakistan, in the contemporary administrative territory of Gilgit–Baltistan. See 1931 census data here:)) (Note: 1941 figure taken from census data by combining the total population of all administrative divisions that compose the region of contemporary Pakistan, including Punjab, (Note: 1941 figure taken from census data by combining the total population of all districts (Lahore, Sialkot, Gujranwala, Sheikhupura, Gujrat, Shahpur, Jhelum, Rawalpindi, Attock, Mianwali, Montgomery, Lyallpur, Jhang, Multan, Muzaffargargh, Dera Ghazi Khan), one tehsil (Shakargarh – then part of Gurdaspur District), one princely state (Bahawalpur), and one tract (Biloch Trans–Frontier) in Punjab Province, British India that ultimately fell on the western side of the Radcliffe Line. See 1941 census data here: Immediately following the partition of India in 1947, these districts and tract would ultimately make up the subdivision of West Punjab, which also later included Bahawalpur. The state that makes up this region in the contemporary era is Punjab, Pakistan.) Sindh, (Note: 1941 figure taken from census data by combining the total population of all districts (Dadu, Hyderabad, Karachi, Larkana, Nawabshah, Sukkur, Tharparkar, Upper Sind Frontier), and one princely state (Khairpur), in Sindh Province, British India. See 1941 census data here:) Khyber Pakhtunkhwa, Balochistan, Azad Kashmir, and Gilgit–Baltistan. (Note: 1941 figure taken from census data by combining the total population of one district (Astore) and one agency (Gilgit) in the Princely State of Jammu and Kashmir that ultimately would be administered by Pakistan, in the contemporary administrative territory of Gilgit–Baltistan. See 1941 census data here:))

Decadal censuses taken in British India revealed the religious composition of all administrative divisions that would ultimately compose regions situated in contemporary Pakistan. The 1901 Census in British India taken in administrative divisions that would ultimately compose regions situated in contemporary Pakistan indicated that Muslims numbered approximately 14,022,544 persons and comprised roughly 79.5 percent of the total population, rising slightly to around 14,966,846 persons, or 79.6 percent, in 1911. The Muslim share of the population would decline to 78.4 percent in 1921, despite the total Muslim population rising to approximately 15,203,501 persons, and would decline further to 78.0 percent in 1931, even as the total Muslim population grew to roughly 17,557,877 persons.

In the final census taken prior to partition in 1941, Muslims constituted 77.4% of the population in West Pakistan (currently Pakistan) and 70.3% of the population in East Pakistan (currently Bangladesh). After Pakistan gained independence from Britain on 14 August 1947, an estimated 6.5 million Muslims migrated from India to Pakistan. In the 1951 census, West Pakistan (contemporary Pakistan) had a 97.12% Muslim population. The Muslim share of the population remained broadly stable through the 1961 and 1972 censuses, holding in the 96–97% range, before settling into a similarly narrow band of 96.3–96.8% across the 1981, 1998, 2017, and 2023 censuses.

Islam in Pakistan (1901–2023)
Year	Number	Percent	Increase	Growth	Source(s)
1901	14,022,544	79.52%	-	-	
1911	14,966,846	79.58%	+0.06%	+6.73%	
1921	15,203,501	78.41%	-1.17%	+1.58%	
1931	17,557,877	77.98%	-0.43%	+15.49%	
1941	21,113,214	77.43%	-0.55%	+20.25%	
1951	32,731,582	97.12%	+19.69%	+55.03%	
1961	41,666,153	97.17%	+0.05%	+27.3%	
1972	60,434,659	96.75%	-0.42%	+45.04%	
1981	81,450,057	96.67%	-0.08%	+34.77%	
1998	127,433,409	96.28%	-0.39%	+56.46%	
2017	200,362,718	96.47%	+0.19%	+57.23%	
2023	231,686,709	96.35%	-0.12%	+15.63%	

=== 1901 census ===
According to the 1901 census, the Muslim population in Pakistan comprised roughly 14.02 million persons or 79.5 percent of the total population. With the exception of the Federally Administered Tribal Areas, all administrative divisions in the region that composes contemporary Pakistan collected religious data, with a combined population of 17,633,258, for an overall response rate of 99.6 percent out of the total population of 17,708,014, as detailed in the table below.

Islam in Pakistan by administrative division
Administrative division	1901 census			
Administrative division	Muslim Population	Muslim Percentage	Total Responses	Total Population
Punjab	7,951,155	76.25%	10,427,765	10,427,765
Sindh	2,609,337	76.52%	3,410,223	3,410,223
Khyber Pakhtunkhwa	1,890,479	92.19%	2,050,724 (Note: Religious data only collected in North West Frontier Province, and not in the Federally Administered Tribal Areas. Total responses to religion includes North West Frontier Province (Khyber Pakhtunkhwa), and total population includes both North West Frontier Province and the Federally Administered Tribal Areas, both administrative divisions which later amalgamated to become Khyber Pakhtunkhwa.)	2,125,480
AJK	747,426	85.62%	872,915	872,915
Balochistan	765,368	94.4%	810,746	810,746
Gilgit–Baltistan	58,779	96.54%	60,885	60,885
Pakistan	14,022,544	79.52%	17,633,258	17,708,014

=== 1911 census ===
According to the 1911 census, the Muslim population in Pakistan comprised roughly 14.97 million persons or 79.6 percent of the total population. With the exception of the Federally Administered Tribal Areas, all administrative divisions in the region that composes contemporary Pakistan collected religious data, with a combined population of 18,806,379, for an overall response rate of 92.1 percent out of the total population of 20,428,473, as detailed in the table below.

Islam in Pakistan by administrative division
Administrative division	1911 census			
Administrative division	Muslim Population	Muslim Percentage	Total Responses	Total Population
Punjab	8,494,314	76.49%	11,104,585	11,104,585
Sindh	2,822,756	75.53%	3,737,223	3,737,223
Khyber Pakhtunkhwa	2,039,994	92.86%	2,196,933	3,819,027
AJK	749,945	87.76%	854,531	854,531
Balochistan	782,648	93.76%	834,703	834,703
Gilgit–Baltistan	77,189	98.45%	78,404	78,404
Pakistan	14,966,846	79.58%	18,806,379	20,428,473

=== 1921 census ===
According to the 1921 census, the Muslim population in Pakistan comprised roughly 15.20 million persons or 78.4 percent of the total population. With the exception of the Federally Administered Tribal Areas, all administrative divisions in the region that composes contemporary Pakistan collected religious data, with a combined population of 19,389,016, for an overall response rate of 87.3 percent out of the total population of 22,214,152, as detailed in the table below.

Islam in Pakistan by administrative division
Administrative division	1921 census			
Administrative division	Muslim Population	Muslim Percentage	Total Responses	Total Population
Punjab	8,975,288	75.49%	11,888,985	11,888,985
Sindh	2,562,700	73.8%	3,472,508	3,472,508
Khyber Pakhtunkhwa	2,062,786	91.62%	2,251,340	5,076,476
AJK	780,607	88.02%	886,861	886,861
Balochistan	733,477	91.73%	799,625	799,625
Gilgit–Baltistan	88,643	98.82%	89,697	89,697
Pakistan	15,203,501	78.41%	19,389,016	22,214,152

=== 1931 census ===
According to the 1931 census, the Muslim population in Pakistan comprised roughly 17.56 million persons or 78.0 percent of the total population. With the exception of the Federally Administered Tribal Areas, all administrative divisions in the region that composes contemporary Pakistan collected religious data, with a combined population of 22,514,768, for an overall response rate of 90.9 percent out of the total population of 24,774,056, as detailed in the table below.

Islam in Pakistan by administrative division
Administrative division	1931 census			
Administrative division	Muslim Population	Muslim Percentage	Total Responses	Total Population
Punjab	10,570,029	75.28%	14,040,798	14,040,798
Sindh	3,017,377	73.34%	4,114,253	4,114,253
Khyber Pakhtunkhwa	2,227,303	91.84%	2,425,076	4,684,364
AJK (Note: 1931 figure taken from census data by combining the total population of two districts (Mirpur and Muzaffarabad) and one Jagir (Poonch) in the Princely State of Jammu and Kashmir that ultimately would be administered by Pakistan, in the contemporary self-administrative territory of Azad Kashmir. See 1931 census data here:)	850,135	87.68%	969,578	969,578
Balochistan	798,093	91.88%	868,617	868,617
Gilgit–Baltistan	94,940	98.44%	96,446	96,446
Pakistan	17,557,877	77.98%	22,514,768	24,774,056

=== 1941 census ===
==== Population by province ====
According to the 1941 census, the Muslim population in Pakistan comprised roughly 21.11 million persons or 77.4 percent of the total population. With the exception of the Federally Administered Tribal Areas, all administrative divisions in the region that composes contemporary Pakistan collected religious data, with a combined population of 27,266,001, for an overall response rate of 92.0 percent out of the total population of 29,643,600, as detailed in the table below.

Islam in Pakistan by administrative division
Administrative division	1941 census			
Administrative division	Muslim Population	Muslim Percentage	Total Responses	Total Population
Punjab	13,022,160	75.1%	17,340,103	17,340,103
Sindh	3,462,015	71.52%	4,840,795	4,840,795
Khyber Pakhtunkhwa	2,788,797	91.8%	3,038,067	5,415,666
AJK	939,460	87.54%	1,073,154	1,073,154
Balochistan	785,181	91.53%	857,835	857,835
Gilgit–Baltistan	115,601	99.62%	116,047	116,047
Pakistan	21,113,214	77.43%	27,266,001	29,643,600

== Denominations ==
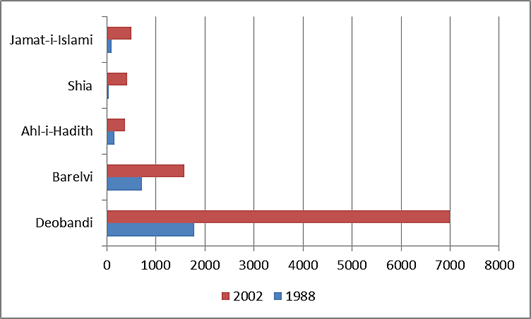
Growth in the number of religious madrassahs in Pakistan from 1988 to 2002

According to the CIA World Factbook and Oxford Centre for Islamic Studies, 96–97% of the total population of Pakistan is Muslim.

=== Sunni ===
The majority of the Pakistani Muslims belong to Sunni Islam. Muslims belong to different schools which are called Madhahib (singular: Madhhab) i.e., schools of jurisprudence (also 'Maktab-e-Fikr' (School of Thought) in Urdu).) Estimates on the Sunni population in Pakistan range from 85% to 90%.

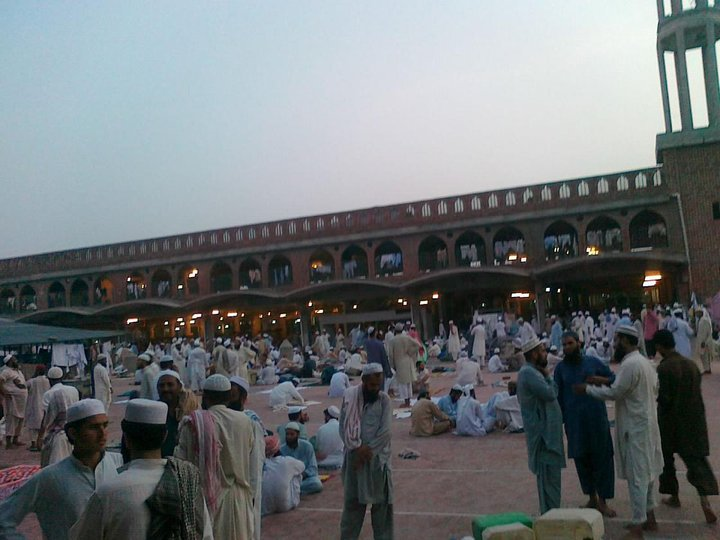
The courtyard of Raiwind Markaz Mosque is near Lahore, a major Sunni Deobandi-affiliated Tablighi Jamaat center. The mosque hosts millions during the annual Ijtema.

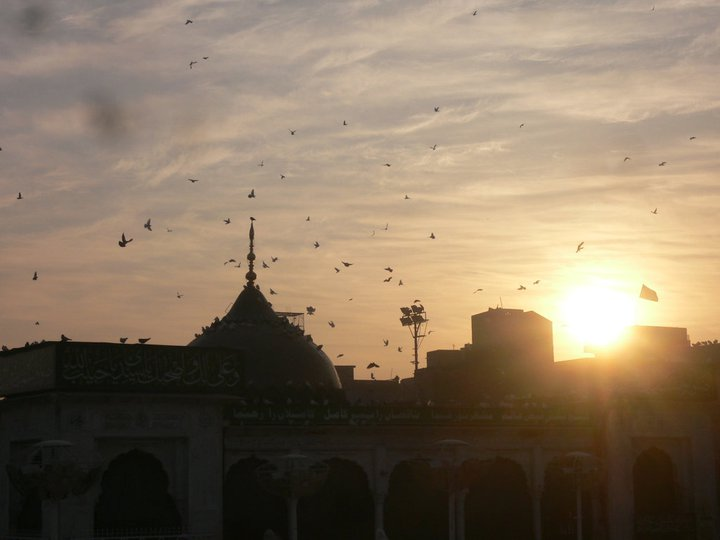
The famed Data Durbar shrine of Sufi saint Ali Hujweiri in Lahore is known for devotees from over the world.

==== Barelvi and Deobandi Sunni Muslims ====
The two major Sunni sects in Pakistan are the Barelvi movement and Deobandi movement. Statistics regarding Pakistan's sects and sub-sects have been called "tenuous", but the Deobandi movement holds significant influence, particularly through its extensive network of madrasas. Approximately 65% of Pakistan's Islamic seminaries are affiliated with the Deobandi school, compared to 25% associated with the Barelvi tradition. This widespread educational infrastructure has enabled the Deobandi movement to play a pivotal role in shaping religious education and discourse across the country.

The Deobandi movement is especially prominent in regions such as Khyber Pakhtunkhwa and Balochistan, where it forms the majority among Sunni Muslims. Its influence extends beyond education into political spheres, with parties like Jamiat Ulema-e-Islam (JUI) playing active roles in national politics.

In contrast, the Barelvi movement, while representing a significant portion of Pakistan's Sunni population, has historically had less institutional influence. However, it has seen a resurgence in recent years, with increased political activism and the formation of parties like Tehreek-e-Labbaik Pakistan.

=== Shia ===
Shias are estimated to constitute about 10-15 percent of the country's population. Major traditions of Shia Islam found in Pakistan include the Twelver Shias (or Ithna Ashariyyah) and the Ismaili Shias (or Seveners); most notably the Dawoodi Bohras and the Khoja Ismailis—known for their prominence in commerce and industry.

Many prominent Shia Muslim politicians were known to play a decisive role in the creation of Pakistan for decades during the Pakistan Movement. The role as the first president of the Muslim League and its main financial backer during its earlier years was undertaken by Sir Aga Khan III, an Ismaili by faith. Other politicians that held prominent roles in the initial decades of the Muslim League include Raja Sahib, Syed Ameer Ali and Syed Wazir Hasan, among others.

A 2012 study found 50% of surveyed Pakistanis considered Shia as Muslims while 41% rejected Shia as Muslims. Shias allege discrimination by the Pakistani government since 1948, claiming that Sunnis are given preference in business, official positions and administration of justice. Attacks on Shias increased under the presidency of Zia-ul-Haq, with the first major sectarian riots in Pakistan breaking out in 1983 in Karachi and later spreading to other parts of the country. Shias have long been a target of Sunni radical groups such as Lashkar-e-Jhangvi in the country. Sectarian violence became a recurring feature of the Muharram month every year, with sectarian violence between Sunnis and Shias taking place on multiple occasions. Since 2008 thousands of Shia have been killed by Sunni extremists according to Human Rights Watch (HRW) and violent clashes between the two sects are common.

A subset of Shia in Pakistan are the Hazara ethnic group—which are distinct from other Shi’a due to their language and facial features. Most Hazaras live in Afghanistan, but Pakistan also hosts between 650,000 and 900,000 – and around 500,000 live in the city of Quetta.

=== Sufism ===
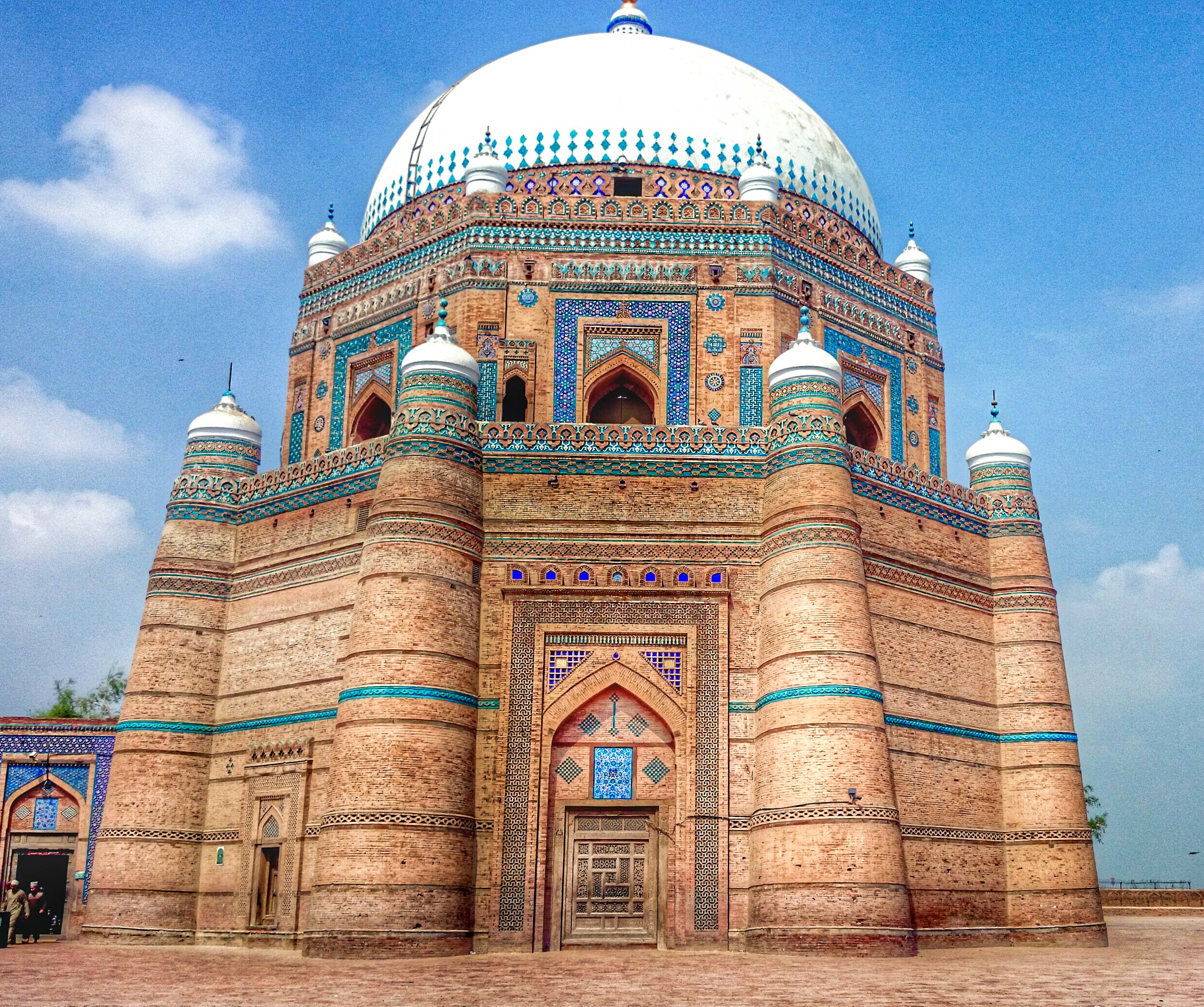
The shrine of Rukn-e-Alam is one of southern Punjab's most important Sufi shrines

Sufism is a vast term and many Sufi orders exist within Pakistan where the philosophy has a strong tradition. Historically, the Sufi missionaries had played a pivotal role in converting the native peoples of Punjab and Sindh to Islam. The most notable Muslim Sufi orders in Pakistan are the Qadiriyya, Naqshbandiya, Chishtiya and Suhrawardiyya silsas (Muslim Orders) and they have a large amount of devotees in Pakistan. The tradition of visiting dargahs is still practiced today. Sufis whose shrines receive much national attention are Data Ganj Baksh (Ali Hajweri) in Lahore (ca. 11th century), Sultan Bahoo in Shorkot Jhang, Baha-ud-din Zakariya in Multan, and Shahbaz Qalander in Sehwan (ca. 12th century) and Shah Abdul Latif Bhitai in Bhit, Sindh and Rehman Baba in Khyber Pakhtunkhwa Province. The Urs (death anniversary) of Sufi saints accounts for the largest gathering upon their shrines held annually by the devotees.

Although, popular Sufi culture is centered on Thursday night gatherings at shrines and annual festivals which feature Sufi music and dance, certain tariqas such as Sarwari Qadri Order, refrain from such traditions and believe in paying visit to the shrines, making prayers or reciting manqabat. Moreover, contemporary Islamic fundamentalists also criticize the popular tradition of singing, dance and music, which in their view, does not accurately reflect the teachings and practice of Mohammad and his companions. There have been terrorist attacks directed at Sufi shrines and festivals, five in 2010 that killed 64 people. Presently, the known tariqas in Pakistan have maintained their organisations usually known as tehreeks and have their khanqahs for the dhikr of Allah, as per the old age Sufi tradition.

=== Quranists ===
Muslims who reject the authority of hadith, known as Quranist, Quraniyoon, or Ahle Quran, are also present in Pakistan. The largest Quranist organization in Pakistan is Ahle Quran, followed by Bazm-e-Tolu-e-Islam. Another Quranist movement in Pakistan is Ahlu Zikr.

=== Non-denominational ===
Roughly twelve per cent of Pakistani Muslims self-describe or have beliefs overlapping with non-denominational Muslims. These Muslims have beliefs that by and large overlap with those of the majority of Muslims and the difference in their prayers are usually non-existent or negligible. Nonetheless, in censuses asking for a clarification on which strand or rite of Muslim faith they most closely align, they usually answer "just a Muslim".

== Religious institutions and education ==
Pakistan has a large and diverse landscape of religious institutions that play a significant role in the country’s social and educational fabric. According to Pakistan’s first economic census, there were over 600,000 mosques in the country as of 2023, reflecting the extensive infrastructure of Islamic worship and community life across urban and rural areas. The census also identified approximately 36,000 religious seminaries (madrassas), which function alongside formal educational institutions and provide structured instruction in Islamic sciences, Qur’anic studies, and traditional curricula such as Dars-i-Nizami, which includes intensive study of Arabic grammar, Qur’anic exegesis, Hadith and its sciences, Islamic jurisprudence and its principles (usul al-fiqh), theology (kalam), logic (mantiq), rhetoric (balagha), and classical Persian and Arabic texts. These seminaries are further organized under major federations such as Wifaq-ul-Madaris al-Arabia, which affiliates over 20,000 Deobandi-aligned madaris, and Tanzeem ul Madaris Ahle Sunnat, which works with a large network of over 10,000 Barelvi madrasas, reflecting the institutional diversity in religious education. In addition to seminaries, Pakistan hosts thousands of mosques and religious centres where mosque-based instruction, Qur’an memorization, and community religious activities take place. Large seminaries such as Jamia Tur Rasheed in Karachi offer accredited programs that blend traditional Islamic sciences with modern academic frameworks and contribute to the production of religious scholars, teachers, and writers.

In parallel to the madrasa system, Islamic education in Pakistan is also firmly embedded within the country’s public and private universities, where Islamic Studies constitutes a major academic discipline at undergraduate, postgraduate, and doctoral levels. According to data compiled from the Higher Education Commission of Pakistan and presented by Gallup Pakistan, Islamic Studies ranks among the most popular PhD subjects nationwide, with approximately 1,300 doctoral candidates out approximately 32,640 PhD scholars enrolled across 119 universities nationwide, placing it behind Chemistry, Mathematics and Education, and ahead of disciplines such as Urdu, Physics and Zoology. This reflects the institutionalization of Islamic scholarship within Pakistan’s modern higher education system, where Islamic Studies is pursued alongside disciplines such as chemistry, mathematics, and education. Islamic Studies departments and research centres operate across a wide range of universities, including major public institutions such as the International Islamic University, Islamabad, as well as private and specialized universities. These departments offer degree programmes that combine classical Islamic sciences with contemporary academic methodologies, contributing to scholarly research, teacher training, and public intellectual life beyond the traditional madrasa framework.

== Religiosity levels ==
Survey research indicates that Muslims in Pakistan report high levels of religious commitment compared with Muslims in neighboring South Asian countries. According to surveys conducted by the Pew Research Center in late 2011 and early 2012, approximately 94% of Muslim adults in Pakistan stated that religion is very important in their lives. Measures of religious practice also indicate high observance: about 42% reported praying five times daily, and 59% said they attend a mosque at least once a week. In comparative perspective, levels of mosque attendance reported by Muslims in Pakistan were somewhat lower than those reported by Muslims in India (70%), a difference that Pew attributes largely to higher reported attendance among women in India. On questions of religious interpretation, Pakistani Muslims were more likely than Muslims in India to endorse exclusivist views. In the same surveys, 72% of Muslims in Pakistan agreed that there is only one correct way to interpret the teachings of Islam, compared with 63% in India and 69% in Bangladesh, suggesting comparatively higher levels of doctrinal exclusivism among respondents in Pakistan. Likewise, core theological beliefs are reported at very high levels among Muslims in Pakistan. Approximately 98% of Pakistani Muslims reported belief in heaven, 97% reported belief in angels, and 91% expressed belief in fate (qadar). Belief in the "evil eye" was also relatively common, with about 61% of respondents affirming such beliefs. In comparative perspective, Pakistani Muslims reported substantially higher levels of belief in heaven and angels than Muslims in India, whose responses more closely resembled those of Hindus in India on these items.

=== Youth radicalization ===
Data from the World Values Survey (Wave 7, 2017–2022) indicate generational differences in religiosity and political attitudes among Muslims in Pakistan. Religious identification with Islam is near-universal across age groups, but more so among respondents aged up to 29 years (99.4%, compared to 98.3% for the general population). Younger cohorts also express stronger support for Islamist political ideas than older Pakistanis. When asked if they would like to have a system governed by religious law in which there are no political parties or elections, 75.1% of urban respondents aged up to 29 rated such arrangements positively, compared with 68.4% among urban respondents aged 30–49 and 65.2% among those aged 50 and above. A similar generational pattern is observed in rural areas, where 65.2% of respondents aged up to 29 expressed positive views, compared with 61.0% among those aged 30–49 and 56.6% among those aged 50 and above. Across both urban and rural settings, support declines steadily with age, indicating that younger Pakistanis are more inclined than older cohorts to endorse Islamist-oriented conceptions of politics. The rest would prefer a form of Islamic democracy.

== Contemporary issues ==
=== Blasphemy ===
The Pakistan Penal Code, the main criminal code of Pakistan, punishes blasphemy (Urdu: قانون توہین رسالت) against any recognized religion, providing penalties ranging from a fine to death. Pakistan inherited blasphemy laws enacted by British colonial authorities and made them more severe between 1980 and 1986, when a number of clauses were added by the military government of General Zia-ul Haq, in order to "Islamicise" the laws and deny the Muslim character of the Ahmadi minority. Parliament through the Second Amendment to the Constitution on 7 September 1974, under Prime Minister Zulfiqar Ali Bhutto, declared Ahmadi Muslims as non-Muslims. In 1986 it was supplemented by a new blasphemy provision also applied to Ahmadi Muslims (See Persecution of Ahmadis). In 2020, the European Foundation for South Asian Studies (EFSAS) in a report entitled, Guilty until proven innocent: The sacrilegious nature of blasphemy laws Pakistan, recommended wide-ranging changes to Pakistan's laws and legal systems.

=== Conversions ===
There have been conversions to Islam from the religious minorities of Pakistan. The Human Rights Council of Pakistan has reported that cases of forced conversion to Islam are increasing. According to victims' families and activists, Mian Abdul Haq, who is a local political and religious leader in Sindh, has been accused of being responsible for forced conversions of girls within the province.

== See also ==
- Freedom of religion in Pakistan
- History of the Islamic Republic of Pakistan
- Islam in South Asia
- Islamization in Pakistan
- Religion in Pakistan
- Religious discrimination in Pakistan
- Shia Islam in Pakistan
- Sufism in Pakistan
- Islam by country
