= Maso Sahar =

Maso Sahar Sindhi: مسو ساھڙ
- village
- ڳوٺ مسو ساھڙ
- Interactive map of Maso Sahar
- Coordinates: 27.133536°N 67.964567°E
- Country: Pakistan
- Province: Sindh
- District: Dadu District

Government
  - Leader: Rais Ali Murad Sahar

Population
  - Total: 3,122
- Time zone: UTC+5 (PST)
  - Summer (DST): PDT
- Postal code: 76330

Maso Sahar (Sindhi: مسوساهڙ Mehar) is a village in Mehar Tehsil in Dadu District, Sindh, Pakistan.

The village was established in 1721. According to a 2018 survey, its population was at least 3,122.

== Natural disaster ==
This village suffered severe damage due to the heavy rains and floods of 2022, due to which all the crops were destroyed due to the heavy rains, all the houses of the people collapsed and the grain for food and drink fell under the water.

== History ==
The taluka, along with the rest of Sindh, was for a time was part of the Bombay Presidency of British India.

== Education ==
A primary school for boys was established in 1940, and one for girls in 1987 and also a sindh public primary school.

- Govt.primary school boys (1940)
- Govt.primary school girls(1987) Sindh public school masso sahar
