= Irfan Zafar Leghari =

Pakistani politician

Irfan Zafar Laghari
- عمران ظفر لغاری

Member of the National Assembly of Pakistan
- Incumbent
- Assumed office 29 February 2024
- Constituency: NA-227 Dadu-I
- In office 13 August 2018 – 10 August 2023
- Constituency: NA-234 (Dadu-I)

Personal details
- Party: PPP (2018-present)
- Relations: Imran Zafar (brother)

Irfan Zafar Laghari is a Pakistani politician who has been a member of the National Assembly of Pakistan since February 2024 and previously served in this position from August 2018 till August 2023.

== Early life ==
Laghari is the son of late former Federal Minister Haji Zafar Ali Laghari.

== Political career ==
He was elected to the National Assembly of Pakistan from NA-234 (Dadu-I) as a candidate of Pakistan Peoples Party in the 2018 Pakistani general election. He received 96,038 votes and defeated Liaquat Ali Jatoi, a candidate of Pakistan Tehreek-e-Insaf (PTI).

He was re-elected to the National Assembly as a candidate of PPP from NA-227 Dadu-I in the 2024 Pakistani general election. He received 104,141 votes and defeated Liaquat Ali Jatoi, a candidate of the Grand Democratic Alliance (GDA).
