= Awami Ittehad Party =

Awami Ittehad Party may refer to:

- Jammu and Kashmir Awami Ittehad Party, a political party based in the Indian Kashmir
- Sindh Awami Ittehad, a now defunct political party from Sindh, Pakistan
