= Abdul Aziz Junejo =

Pakistani politician (1961–2024)

- عبدالعزیز جونیجو

Member of the Provincial Assembly of Sindh
- In office 13 August 2018 – 11 August 2023
- Constituency: PS-83 Dadu-I
- In office May 2016 – 28 May 2018
- Constituency: PS-76 Dadu-III

Personal details
- Born: 7 December 1961
- Died: 13 February 2024 (aged 62) Karachi, Sindh, Pakistan
- Resting place: Khairpur Nathan Shah
- Party: PPP (2016-2024)
- Relations: Zubair Ahmed Junejo (nephew)

Abdul Aziz Junejo (7 December 1961 – 13 February 2024) was a Pakistani politician who served as a Member of the Provincial Assembly of Sindh from August 2018 to August 2023 and from May 2016 to May 2018.

== Early life and education ==
Abdul Aziz Junejo was born on 7 December 1961.

Junejo gained his Bachelor of Engineering from NED University of Engineering & Technology.

== Political career ==
Junejo was elected to the Provincial Assembly of Sindh as a candidate of Pakistan Peoples Party (PPP) from Constituency PS-76 Dadu-III in by-polls held in May 2016.

Junejo was re-elected to Provincial Assembly of Sindh as a candidate of PPP from Constituency PS-83 (Dadu-I) in the 2018 Pakistani general election.

Junejo was re-elected to Provincial Assembly of Sindh from the constituency of PS-80 (Dadu-I) as a candidate of PPP in the 2024 Pakistani general election.

== Death ==
Junejo died in Karachi on 13 February 2024, at the age of 62. He was buried in Khairpur Nathan Shah.
