= Haji Amir Bux Junejo =

Pakistani politician

Member of Provisional Assembly, Sindh, 1970
- In office 1970–1977
- President: Zulfiqar Ali Bhutto

Member of Provisional Assembly, Sindh, 1988
- In office 1988–1990
- President: Ghulam Ishaq Khan
- Prime Minister: Benazir Bhutto

Member of Provisional Assembly, Sindh, 1990
- In office 1990–1993
- President: Ghulam Ishaq Khan
- Prime Minister: Nawaz Sharif

Member of Provisional Assembly, Sindh, 1997
- In office 1997–1999
- President: Rafiq Tarar
- Prime Minister: Nawaz Sharif

Personal details
- Born: Amir Bux Junejo; 24 December 1916 Village Ali Bux Junejo, P.O. Khanpur Junejo, Taluka KN Shah, Dadu District
- Died: 7 October 2011 (aged 94) Hyderabad
- Resting place: Khanpur Junejo
- Party: Pakistan Peoples Party
- Occupation: Politician, Social Worker
- Profession: Landlord

Haji Amir Bux Junejo (24 December 1916 – 7 October 2011) was a Pakistani politician who was elected four times member in Provisional Assembly, Sindh. He was famously known as "Otaqi Wadero" of Sindh whose guest house was open to all and sundry where they were fed round the clock.

== Early life ==
Junejowas the only son of Imam Bux Khan Junejo, Born on 24 December 1916 in Khanpur, 1916 in Khanpur, Junejo passed primary education in 1927 in Khanpur primary School, He passed Sindhi Final in 1939 in Govt. High School Boriri. He recruited to Police in 1941 as Sobedar (Inspector). He resigned in 1946 and joined independence struggle by the Muslim League.

== Political career ==
In the 1970s he joined PPP and was elected MPA on the party ticket three times in 1970, 1988 and 1990. Junejo took part in the Movement for Restoration of Democracy in 1983 and was sent to jail for six months.

In the General Election of 1970 He was the highest vote achiever in numbers on MPA seat in East & West Pakistan, BBC broadcast that news. He was considered to be the closed companion of Zulfiqar Ali Bhutto and Benazir Bhutto.

He left PPP and joined PML in 1993 and was again elected MPA in 1997. After the assassination of Benazir Bhutto, he stopped running for MPA and later rejoined PPP.

== Social work ==
He was well-known for providing for the community and many visited his guest house to receive hospitality.

Haji Amir Bux Junejo provided a three-time meal to hundreds of people daily. He helped the poor and he provided grain for the entire families during wheat harvest season.

Late Junejo had allocated income from 500 acres of his farmland to feed the hungry and his guests. Hundreds of people used to visit his Otaq daily to have food.

== Death ==
He died on 7 October 2011 at his Hyderabad residence in Qasimabad. He is survived by three sons and seven daughters.

== Funeral and burial ==
Late Junejo was laid to rest at Jamia Masjid Ali Bux Junejo in Kakar town and his funeral prayer was held in Ali Bux Junejo village. Funeral Pryer was performed by Syed Hussain Shah of Qamber Shareef, Awami Ittehad Party chairman Liaquat Ali Jatoi, former MPA Sadaqat Ali Jatoi and Pir of Ranipur Roshan Ali Shah were also among those who attended his funeral prayer.

== Publications on Amir Bux Junejo ==
- Insaniyat Jo Khidmatgaar (Servant of Humanity) By: Pavel Junejo & Najam Junejo
- Article by Daily Ibrat
- Article in Sunday Magazine of Awami Awaz
- News by Daily Sindh
- Article by Mukhtiar Chandio

== See also ==
- Junejo
- Dadu District
- Mohammad Khan Junejo
- Jam Sadiq Ali
- Liaquat Ali Jatoi
