= Raaz Nathanshahi =

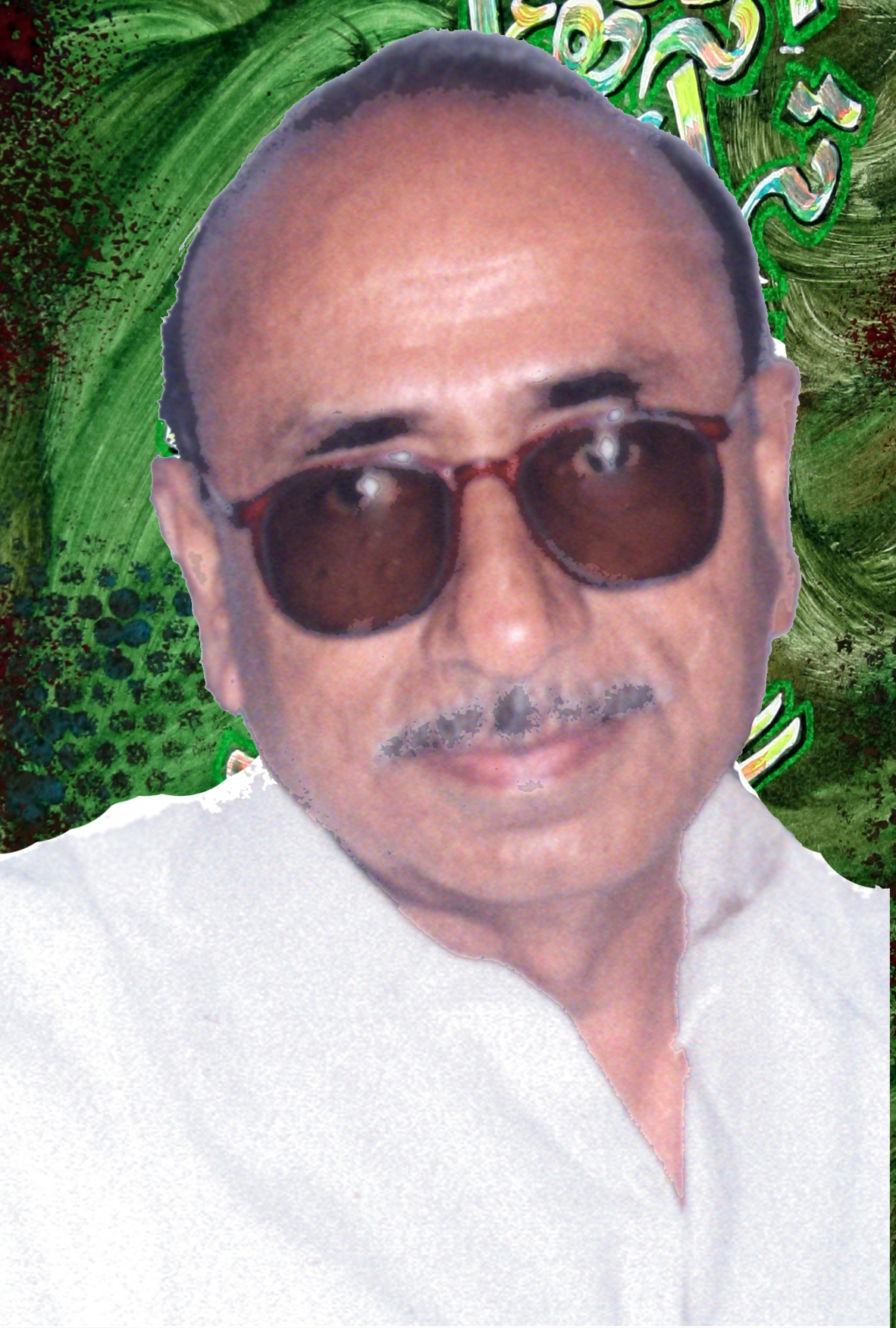
Raz Nathan Shahi

Raz Nathan Shahi (7 August 1947 – 4 November 2019) was a Pakistani artist, calligrapher, writer and poet.

== Early life ==
His real name was Ali Sher Merani and he was born to Noor Muhammad Merani in a small town of Khairpur Nathan Shah in Dadu District, Sindh, Pakistan .

== Career ==
He illustrated the poetry of Shah Abdul Latif Bhittai in picturesque calligraphy in Sindhi and Urdu.

Nathanshahi worked at the Pakistan Television Corporation for 35 years as a writer and artist. He received several prizes, gold medals and certificates from different institutions.
