= Federal Capital Territory (Pakistan) =

Former capital territory of Pakistan

Federal Capital Territory وفاقی دارالحکومتی علاقہ Vifāqī Dār-ul-hukūmatī 'ilāqā
- Federal territory of Pakistan
- 1948–1961
- Flag of the Federal Capital Territory

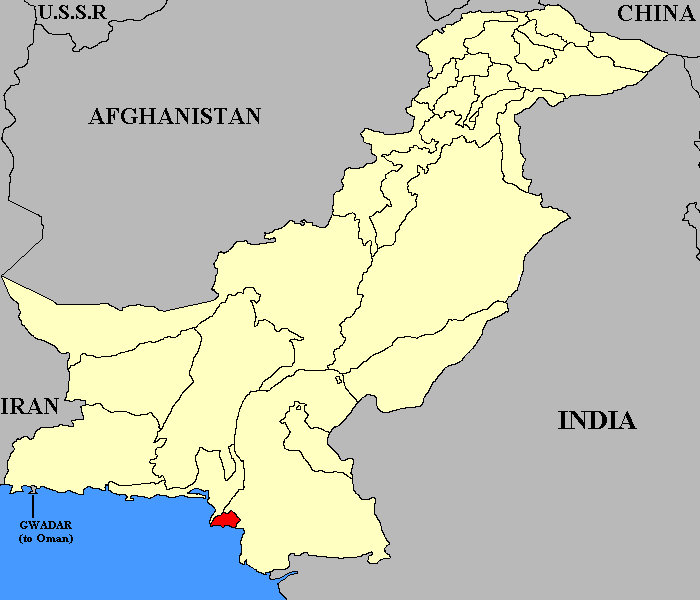
- The Federal Capital Territory (FCT) highlighted in red within a map of the western half of Pakistan
- Capital: Karachi
- Area
  - Coordinates: 24°51′36″N 67°0′36″E
  - 1951: 2,103 km^{2} (812 sq mi)
- Population
  - 1951: 1,122,406
- Status: Federal capital (1948–1959)
- Government: Karachi Municipal Corporation
  - Type: Federally-administered territory with a local municipal body
  - HQ: Karachi Metropolitan Corporation Building
- Federal administrator
  - 1948–51: Syed Hashim Raza
- Mayor
  - 1951–53: Allah Bakhsh Gabol (first)
  - 1961: Allah Bakhsh Gabol (last)
- History
  - Established: 23 July 1948
  - Capital shifted to Rawalpindi: 26 October 1959
  - Dissolved and merged into West Pakistan: 29 June 1961
Preceded by	Succeeded by
Province of Sind	West Pakistan
- Today part of: Sindh

The Federal Capital Territory (FCT) around Karachi was the original capital territory of Pakistan. The FCT was created in 1948 from the city of Karachi and surrounding areas as the location for Pakistan's capital following its creation. This move, however, was controversial as the territory was created despite resistance from the local groups in Sindh. The FCT was bordered by the province of Sindh to the northeast and the princely state of Las Bela to the northwest with the Arabian Sea to the south.

== History ==
Karachi became the first capital of the new country of Pakistan in 1947. The FCT was created in 1948 to enable the federal government to operate from a nationally-held territory. At that time it had a population of 400,000 people which began to increase rapidly because of the political focus on the city and the fact that it was the major commercial seaport for western Pakistan. When the territory was absorbed into the province of West Pakistan, the city had a population of about 1.9 million.

The main ethnic groups in this region before the partition of the Indian subcontinent consisted of several small linguistic and religious groups such as Sindhi Hindus, Sindhi Muslims, Baloch Makranis, Gujarati communities, which included Parsis, Hindus, Sunni Muslims, Ismaili Muslims, Daudi Bohras, Marwari Muslims, Kacchi Muslims, and a large number of local Christian communities. A considerable number of Sindhis and Balochs resided in sporadic villages in this region. The majority spoken language was Sindhi spoken by 52% of population as per 1946 census. However, all of these communities were collectively and simultaneously outnumbered by the inflow of Muslim Muhajir who started settling in Karachi because it was the federal capital as well as the largest commercial hub; and somewhat due to Hindu communities' migration from this region to India, resulting in dramatic and demographic changes in this area.

== Geography and climate ==
The Federal Capital Territory occupied 2,103 km² compared to the current City-District of Karachi which occupies 3,527 km². Apart from Karachi City, the Federal Capital Territory also contained several small villages and towns which have now been subsumed in the metropolitan area of Karachi. The territory covered rolling plains bound by hills to the north and west, the river Indus to the east, and the Arabian Sea to the south. Several smaller rivers flowed through the heart of the territory including the river Malir and the river Layari. The Port of Karachi was located in a protected bay to the southwest of the city, protected by several small islands. The climate of the territory was moderated by the influence of the sea with relatively mild winters and warm summers. There was low precipitation and high humidity for much of the year except during the short monsoon rains.

== Economy and transport ==
Karachi was, and still is, the financial capital of Pakistan, accounting for the largest share of the nation's GDP and generating the largest share of the national revenue. The State Bank of Pakistan and most commercial banks had their headquarters in Karachi together with Pakistan's first and largest stock exchange - the KSE now PSX.

The FCT was served by the old Quaid-e-Azam International Airport (now Jinnah International Airport) terminal which is now used for Hajj flights and cargo facilities. In addition, there was an airport at Mauripur which is now the Masroor Pakistan Air Force base. In 1947, Karachi had the only major port in western Pakistan while Chittagong was the main port for eastern Pakistan. The city was linked to the rest of West Pakistan by railway with the main stations at Karachi City Station and Karachi Cantonment Station.

== See also ==
- Karachi
- Islamabad Capital Territory
- East Pakistan
