= Sind Province (1936–1955) =

Province of British India (1936–1947) and Pakistan (1947-1955)

Coordinates: 26.10°N 68.56°E

Sind سندھ (Urdu) سنڌ (Sindhi)
- Former Province of British India & Pakistan
- 1936–1955
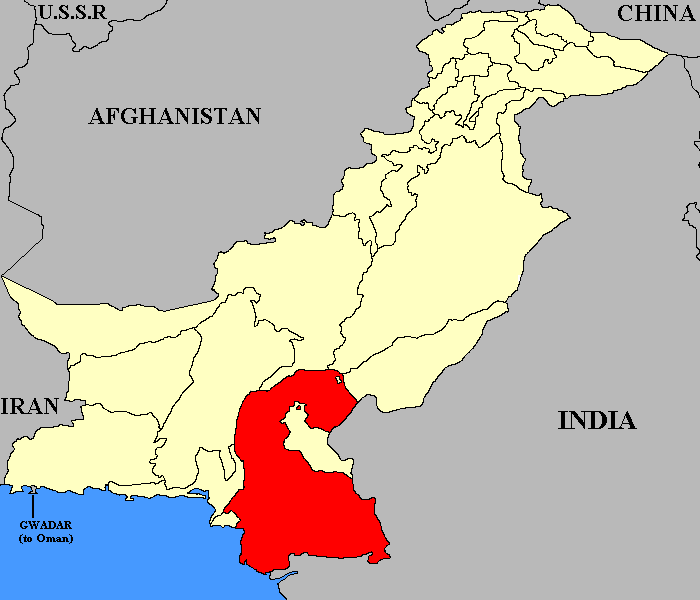
- Province of Sind in Pakistan
- Capital: Karachi (1936–1947); Hyderabad (1947–1955)
- Area
- 123,080 km^{2} (47,520 sq mi)
- History
  - Formation of Sind Province: 1 April 1936
  - Pakistan Resolution in Sindh assembly: 3 March 1943
  - Province of Pakistan: 14 August 1947
  - Disestablished: 14 October 1955
Preceded by	Succeeded by
Sind Division	FCT; West Pakistan

Sind, sometimes spelled Scinde, was a province of Pakistan from 1947 till its amalgamation into West Pakistan in 1955; and prior, a province of British India from being granted provincial status in 1936 till independence of Pakistan in 1947. Karachi was the capital of the province till 1948, succeeded by Hyderabad.

Under the British, it encompassed the current territorial limits excluding the princely state of Khairpur. In 1948, Karachi was separated from the province to form the Federal Capital Territory and serve as the federal capital of Pakistan; this resulted in the provincial capital being shifted to Hyderabad. The province was dissolved alongside Baluchistan, the North-West Frontier Province, West Punjab, and a number of Pakistani princely states to form a unified province of West Pakistan in 1955, upon implementation of the One Unit Scheme.

== Administrative divisions ==
On 1 April 1936, Sind Division was separated from Bombay Presidency and given its provincial status.

At that time, its administrative divisions were as listed below:

Sind (British India): British Territory and Princely State
Division	Districts in British Territory / Princely State	Map
Hyderabad Division	Hyderabad; Tharparkar; Nawabshah; Sukkur; Upper Sind Frontier; Larkana; Karachi; Dadu	
Total area, British Territory	123,080 km^{2} (47,520 sq mi)	
Native States	Khairpur	
Total area, Native States	15,730 km^{2} (6,070 sq mi)	
Total area, Sind	123,080 km^{2} (47,520 sq mi)	

== Geography ==
The province was bordered by Karachi (within the Federal Capital Territory after 1948) and the princely states of Las Bela and Kalat on the west. To the north were the provinces of Baluchistan and West Punjab. The province bordered the princely state of Bahawalpur on the northeast and it enclosed on three sides the princely state of Khairpur. The modern Indian states of Rajasthan and Gujarat were beyond its borders to the east and south. On the southwest lay the Arabian Sea, with the Sind's coastline consisting entirely of river deltas, including the Indus River Delta up to Sind's border with the city of Karachi, now the capital of present-day Sindh.

== History ==
Soon after the arrival of European companies, in particular the East India Company, the Mughal hold on the area loosened, and in 1843 Sindh became part of the British India, and its Bombay Presidency on 1 October 1848. Later it became Sind province on 1 April 1936 under All India Act of 1935.

=== 1936–1947 ===
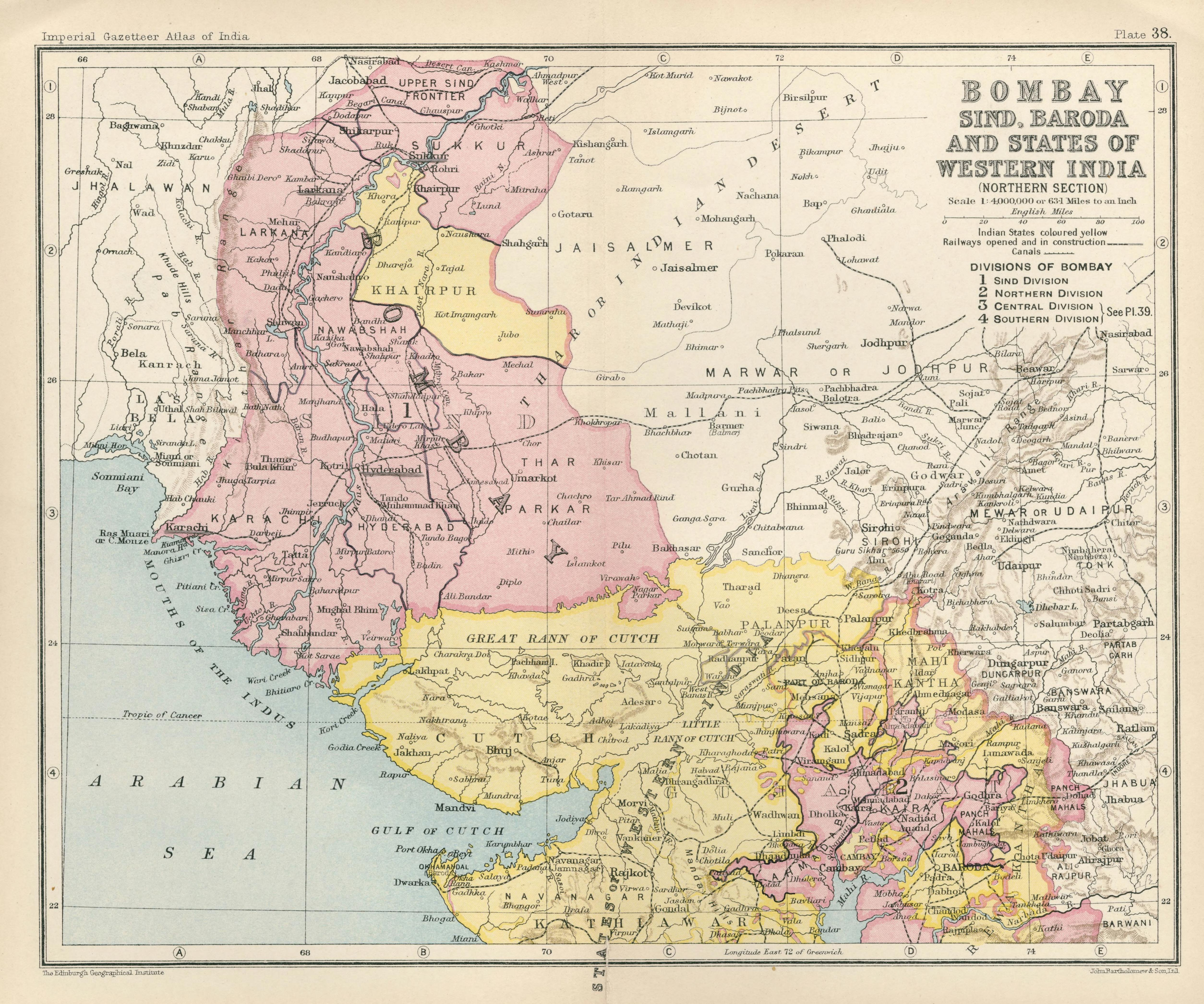
Map of Bombay, Sind, Baroda, and states of Western India (northern section), published in the 'Imperial Gazetteer of India' (Vol. XXVI, Atlas; 1931 revised edition; plate no. 38)

On 1 April 1936, Sind was separated from the Bombay Presidency and given the status of a province, with Karachi as the provincial capital.

=== 1947–1955 ===
Following a resolution in the Sindh Legislative Assembly about joining Pakistan, with the independence and partition of British India in August 1947 Sindh became part of Pakistan.

In 1948, Karachi city (2,103 km2 area) separated from Sind to form the Federal Capital Territory of Pakistan. Apart from the city, the remaining areas of Karachi District remained part of Sind and a new district of Thatta was formed from these areas.

On 11 December 1954, the Sindh Legislative Assembly voted by 100 to 4 in favour of the One Unit policy announced by Prime Minister Chaudhri Muhammad Ali, and Sindh was merged into the new province of West Pakistan on 14 October 1955.

== Government ==
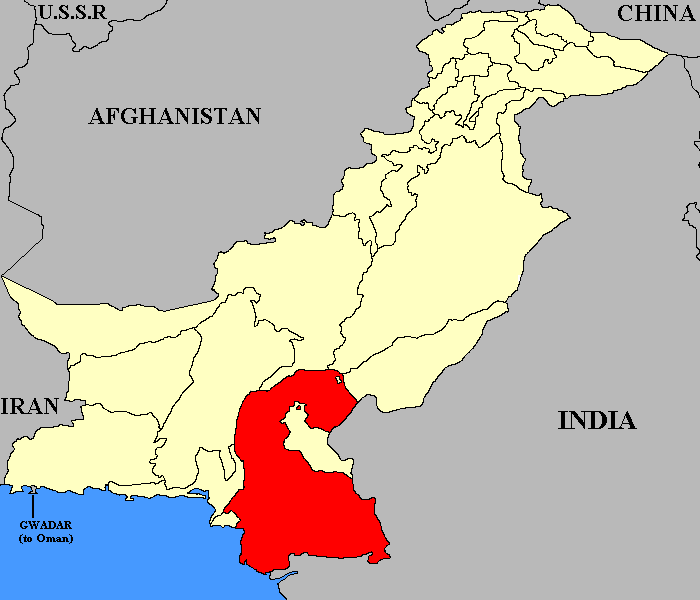
Map of the province post-partition

The offices of Governor of Sindh and Premier (later Chief Minister) of Sindh were established in 1936 when Sindh became a province. This system continued until 1955 when Sindh was dissolved.

Tenure	Governor of Sindh
1 April 1936	Province of Sindh established
1 April 1936 – 1 August 1938	Sir Lancelot Graham (first time)
1 August 1938 – 1 December 1938	Joseph Garrett (acting)
1 December 1938 – 1 April 1941	Sir Lancelot Graham (2nd time)
1 April 1941 – 15 January 1946	Sir Hugh Dow
15 January 1946 – 14 August 1947	Sir Robert Francis Mudie
14 August 1947	Independence of Pakistan
14 August 1947 – 4 October 1948	Sir Ghulam Hussain Hidayatullah
4 October 1948 – 19 November 1952	Sheikh Din Muhammad
19 November 1952 – 1 May 1953	Mian Aminuddin
1 May 1953 – 12 August 1953	George Baxandall Constantine
12 August 1953 – 23 June 1954	Habib Ibrahim Rahmatullah
23 June 1954 – 14 October 1955	Iftikhar Hussain Khan
14 October 1955	Province of Sindh dissolved

Name of Premier (pre-partition)	Entered Office	Left Office	Political Party/Notes
Ghulam Hussain Hidayat Ullah (1st time)	28 April 1937	23 March 1938	Muslim People's Party
Allah Bux Soomro (1st time)	23 March 1938	18 April 1940	Ittehad Party
Mir Bandeh Ali Khan Talpur	18 April 1940	7 March 1941	All-India Muslim League
Allah Bux Soomro (2nd time)	7 March 1941	14 October 1942	Ittehad Party
Ghulam Hussain Hidayat Ullah (2nd time)	14 October 1942	14 August 1947	Muslim People's Party

Tenure	Chief Minister of Sind	Political party
14 August 1947 – 28 April 1948	Mohammad Ayub Khuhro (1st time)	Pakistan Muslim League
3 May 1948 – 4 February 1949	Pir Illahi Bakhsh	Pakistan Muslim League
18 February 1949 – 7 May 1950	Yusuf Haroon	Non-partisan
8 May 1950 – 24 March 1951	Qazi Fazlullah Ubaidullah	Non-partisan
25 March 1951 – 29 December 1951	Mohammad Ayub Khuhro (2nd time)	Pakistan Muslim League
29 December 1951 – 22 May 1953	Governor's rule	
22 May 1953 – 8 November 1954	Pirzada Abdus Sattar	Pakistan Muslim League
9 November 1954 – 14 October 1955	Mohammad Ayub Khuhro (3rd time)	Pakistan Muslim League
14 October 1955	Province of Sindh dissolved	

=== Elections ===
- 1937
- 1946
- 1953

== Demographics ==
By the time of independence in 1947, Sindh had a Muslim majority for centuries but there was significant minority of Hindus throughout the province. In 1947, due to communal tensions and partition, two million Muslim muhajirs fled to Pakistan from India while most Sindhi Hindus fled to India. The Muslims from India were mostly Urdu-speaking.

Religion in Sindh (1872−1951)
Religious group	1872 (Note: 1872 figure taken from census data by combining the total population of all districts (Karachi, Hyderabad, Shikarpur, Tharparkar, Upper Sind Frontier), and one princely state (Khairpur), in Sindh Province, British India. Religious affiliation was not enumerated in Khairpur. See 1872 census data here:)		1881 (Note: 1881 figure taken from census data by combining the total population of all districts (Karachi, Hyderabad, Shikarpur, Tharparkar, Upper Sind Frontier), and one princely state (Khairpur), in Sindh Province, British India. See 1881 census data here:)		1891 (Note: 1891 figure taken from census data by combining the total population of all districts (Karachi, Hyderabad, Shikarpur, Tharparkar, Upper Sind Frontier), and one princely state (Khairpur), in Sindh Province, British India. See 1891 census data here:)		1901 (Note: 1901 figure taken from census data by combining the total population of all districts (Karachi, Hyderabad, Shikarpur, Tharparkar, Upper Sind Frontier), and one princely state (Khairpur), in Sindh Province, British India. See 1901 census data here:)		1911 (Note: 1911 figure taken from census data by combining the total population of all districts (Hyderabad, Karachi, Larkana, Sukkur, Tharparkar, Upper Sind Frontier), and one princely state (Khairpur), in Sindh Province, British India. See 1911 census data here:)		1921 (Note: 1921 figure taken from census data by combining the total population of all districts (Hyderabad, Karachi, Larkana, Nawabshah, Sukkur, Tharparkar, Upper Sind Frontier), and one princely state (Khairpur), in Sindh Province, British India. See 1921 census data here:)		1931 (Note: 1931 figure taken from census data by combining the total population of all districts (Hyderabad, Karachi, Larkana, Nawabshah, Sukkur, Tharparkar, Upper Sind Frontier), and one princely state (Khairpur), in Sindh Province, British India. See 1931 census data here:)		1941 (Note: 1941 figure taken from census data by combining the total population of all districts (Dadu, Hyderabad, Karachi, Larkana, Nawabshah, Sukkur, Tharparkar, Upper Sind Frontier), and one princely state (Khairpur), in Sindh Province, British India. See 1941 census data here:)		1951 (Note: Including Federal Capital Territory (Karachi))	
Religious group	Pop.	%	Pop.	%	Pop.	%	Pop.	%	Pop.	%	Pop.	%	Pop.	%	Pop.	%	Pop.	%
Islam	1,712,221	78.1%	1,989,630	78.24%	2,318,180	77.18%	2,609,337	76.52%	2,822,756	75.53%	2,562,700	73.8%	3,017,377	73.34%	3,462,015	71.52%	5,535,645	91.53%
Hinduism (Note: 1872 census: Also includes Tribals, Jains, Buddhists, and Nanakpanthis (Sikhs). 1881 census: Also includes Tribals and Nanakpanthis (Sikhs). 1891 census: Also includes Tribals. 1901 census: Also includes Tribals and Nanakpanthis (Sikhs).)	475,848	21.7%	544,848	21.43%	674,371	22.45%	787,683	23.1%	877,313	23.47%	876,629	25.24%	1,055,119	25.65%	1,279,530	26.43%	482,560	7.98%
Christianity	3,329	0.15%	6,082	0.24%	7,768	0.26%	7,825	0.23%	10,917	0.29%	11,734	0.34%	15,152	0.37%	20,304	0.42%	22,601	0.37%
Zoroastrianism	810	0.04%	1,063	0.04%	1,534	0.05%	2,000	0.06%	2,411	0.06%	2,913	0.08%	3,537	0.09%	3,841	0.08%	5,046	0.08%
Judaism	35	0%	153	0.01%	210	0.01%	428	0.01%	595	0.02%	671	0.02%	985	0.02%	1,082	0.02%	—N/a	—N/a
Jainism	—N/a	—N/a	1,191	0.05%	923	0.03%	921	0.03%	1,349	0.04%	1,534	0.04%	1,144	0.03%	3,687	0.08%	—N/a	—N/a
Buddhism	—N/a	—N/a	9	0%	2	0%	0	0%	21	0.001%	41	0.001%	53	0.001%	111	0.002%	670	0.01%
Sikhism	—N/a	—N/a	—N/a	—N/a	720	0.02%	—N/a	—N/a	12,339	0.33%	8,036	0.23%	19,172	0.47%	32,627	0.67%	—N/a	—N/a
Tribal	—N/a	—N/a	—N/a	—N/a	—N/a	—N/a	—N/a	—N/a	9,224	0.25%	8,186	0.24%	204	0%	37,598	0.78%	—N/a	—N/a
Others	172	0.01%	0	0%	3	0%	2,029	0.06%	298	0.01%	64	0.002%	1,510	0.04%	0	0%	1,226	0.02%
Total Responses	2,192,415	94.39%	2,542,976	100%	3,003,711	100%	3,410,223	100%	3,737,223	100%	3,472,508	100%	4,114,253	100%	4,840,795	100%	6,047,748	99.89%
Total Population	2,322,765	100%	2,542,976	100%	3,003,711	100%	3,410,223	100%	3,737,223	100%	3,472,508	100%	4,114,253	100%	4,840,795	100%	6,054,474	100%
Note1: Religious data from the 1881, 1891, 1901, 1911, 1921, 1931, 1941, and 1951 censuses include Khairpur (princely state). Note2: 1951 census includes the Federal Capital Territory (Karachi).

== See also ==
- Sindh
- Khairpur
- Karachi
