= PS-81 Dadu-II =

Constituency of the Provincial Assembly of Sindh, Pakistan

- Constituency for the Provincial Assembly of Sindh
- Region: Mehar Tehsil (partly) of Dadu District
- Electorate: 223,866

Current constituency
- Member: Vacant
- Created from: PS-77 Dadu-VII (2002–2018); PS-84 Dadu-II (2018–2023)

PS-81 Dadu-II (پی ایس-81، دادو-2) is a constituency of the Provincial Assembly of Sindh.

== General elections 2024 ==
Provincial election 2024: PS-81 Dadu-II
Party	Candidate	Votes	%	±%
PPP	Fayaz Ali Butt	54,635	52.66	
GDA	Liaquat Ali Jatoi	47,019	45.32	
Others	Others (seventeen candidates)	2,103	2.02	
Turnout		107,981	48.24	
Total valid votes		103,757	96.09	
Rejected ballots		4,224	3.91	
Majority		7,616	7.34	
Registered electors		223,866		
PPP hold				

== General elections 2018 ==
Provincial election 2018: PS-84 Dadu-II
Party	Candidate	Votes	%	±%
PPP	Fayaz Ali Butt	42,232	47.92	
PTI	Sadaqat Ali Jatoi	41,091	46.63	
Independent	Zubair Ahmed Bhurt	2,153	2.44	
Independent	Dost Muhammad khan	1,438	1.63	
MMA	Muhammad Masood Panhwer	317	0.36	
Independent	Abdul Raheem Chandio	271	0.31	
Independent	Abid Ali Chandio	123	0.14	
Independent	Imtiaz Ali Butt	98	0.11	
SUP	Sikander Ali Sodher	90	0.10	
Independent	Nabi Bux Jatoi	85	0.10	
Independent	Meharab Khan Lakhir	69	0.08	
Independent	Roshan Ali Khaskheli	68	0.08	
Independent	Meer Attaullah Khan Brohi	34	0.04	
Independent	Saleem Akhter Khaskheli	27	0.03	
Independent	Iqbal Ahmed	16	0.02	
PRHP	Manzoor Ahmed Chandio	10	0.01	
Majority		1,141	1.29	
Valid ballots		88,122		
Rejected ballots		4,650		
Turnout		92,722		
Registered electors		176,906		
hold				

== General elections 2013 ==
Contesting candidates	Party affiliation	Votes polled

== General elections 2008 ==
Contesting candidates	Party affiliation	Votes polled

== See also ==
- PS-80 Dadu-I
- PS-82 Dadu-III
