= Zubair Ahmed Junejo =

Member of the Provincial Assembly of Sindh from Dadu (2024–2029)

- زبير احمد جوڻيجو

Member of the Provincial Assembly of Sindh
- Incumbent
- Assumed office 25 February 2024
- Constituency: PS-80 Dadu-I

Personal details
- Party: PPP (2024-present)
- Relations: Abdul Aziz Junejo (uncle)

Zubair Ahmed Junejo (Sindhi: زبير احمد جوڻيجو; Urdu: زبیر احمد جونیجو) is a Pakistani politician who is a member of the Provincial Assembly of Sindh.

== Political career ==
Junejo was elected unopposed from PS-80 Dadu-I in the by-election conducted on 29 March 2024 as a Pakistan People’s Party candidate.
