= Sindh Awami Ittehad =

Sindh Awami Ittehad سندھ عوامي اتحاد
- Sindhi name: سنڌ عوامي اتحاد
- Leader: Liaquat Ali Jatoi
- Founder: Liaquat Ali Jatoi
- Founded: 2012
- Dissolved: 2017

Election symbol
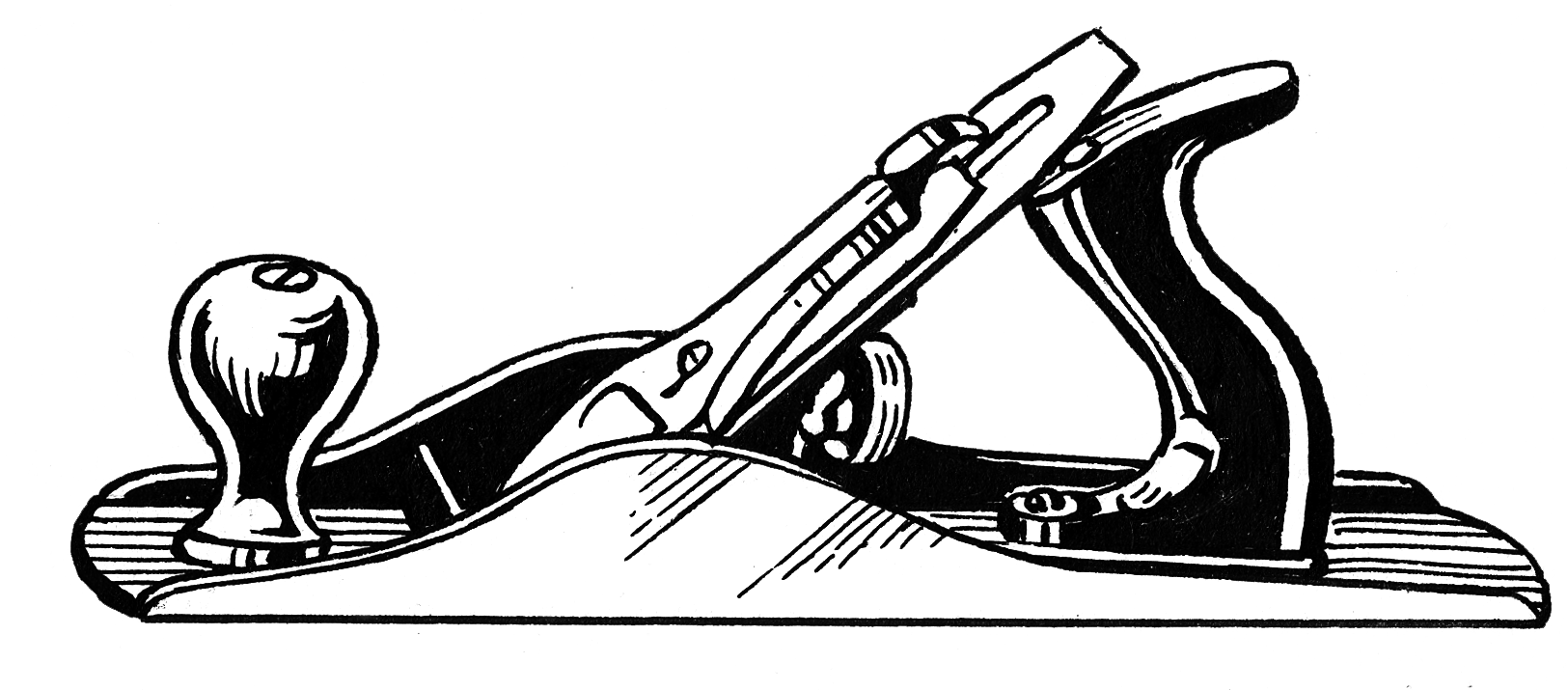
- Planer

Party flag
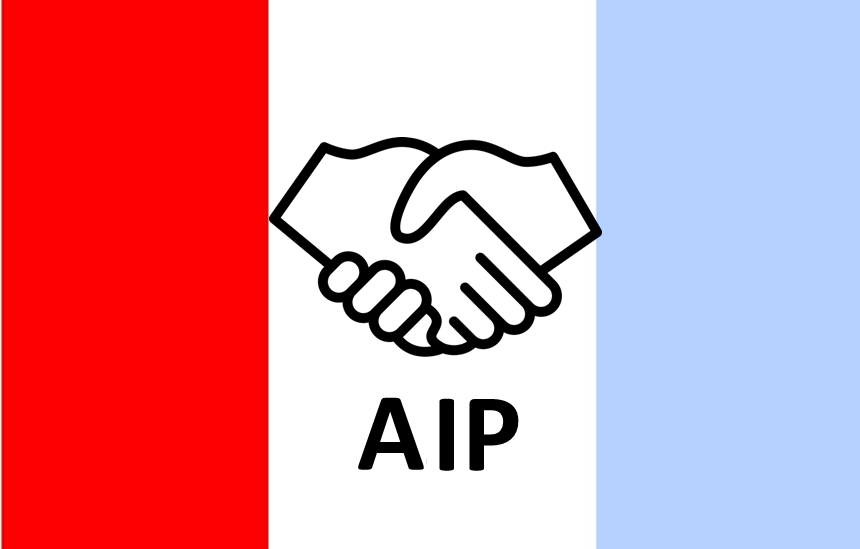

Sindh Awami Ittehad (Urdu: سندھ عوامي اتحاد), (Sindhi: سنڌ عوامي اتحاد) also known as Awami Ittehad Party was a political party established in 2012 by Liaquat Ali Jatoi in Sindh, Pakistan. The party was later announced merged with Pakistan Muslim League (N) after Jatoi joined Pakistan Muslim League (N) in 2012. On 14 September 2014, Jatoi announced to revive this party after parting ways with PML-N. It was later formally dissolved in 2017 after Jatoi joined Pakistan Tehreek-e-Insaf in that year
