= Karachi District (Sind) =

Karachi District under British India underwent significant transformation during the period 1936 to 1948. Initially part of Sind Province, it emerged as a pivotal economic and administrative hub.

The district's role and status underwent a dramatic shift with the Partition of India in 1947, culminating in its transfer to the newly formed Federal Capital Territory of Pakistan in 1948.

== Administration ==
During the British colonial era, the administrative setup of Karachi District included several important talukas:

1. Karachi Taluka - The central hub of trade, administration, and port activities. It included the city and surrounding settlements.

2. Kotri Taluka - Situated near the Indus River, it was significant due to its role in transportation and trade routes.

3. Manora Taluka - A coastal region focused on defense and port operations, including Manora Island.

4. Manjhand Taluka - Located inland, known for its rural settlements and agricultural importance.

5. Thatta Taluka - A historical region with a rich cultural past, once a prominent center of trade and learning.

6. Keti Bunder Taluka - A coastal area serving as a fishing and trading port near the Arabian Sea. Indian Gazetteer of India

== History ==
Following the Partition of India in 1947, Karachi was declared the capital of the newly formed Islamic Republic of Pakistan. To ensure the federal government's autonomy, the Federal Capital Territory (FCT) was carved out of Karachi District in 1948.

The FCT remained the capital of Pakistan until 1960 when the capital was shifted to Rawalpindi. While Karachi's status as the federal capital ended, it continued to be a major economic and financial hub of Pakistan.

== Demographics ==
Religious groups in Karachi District (British Sindh era)
Religious group	1872		1881		1891		1901		1911		1921		1931		1941	
Religious group	Pop.	%	Pop.	%	Pop.	%	Pop.	%	Pop.	%	Pop.	%	Pop.	%	Pop.	%
Islam	347,551	82.07%	390,067	81.49%	453,188	80.23%	483,474	79.54%	396,334	75.97%	386,151	71.24%	465,785	71.63%	457,035	64.02%
Hinduism (Note: 1872 census: Also includes Tribals, Jains, Buddhists, and Nanakpanthis (Sikhs). 1881 census: Also includes Tribals and Nanakpanthis (Sikhs). 1891 census: Also includes Tribals. 1901 census: Also includes Tribals and Nanakpanthis (Sikhs).)	72,513	17.12%	82,860	17.31%	103,589	18.34%	115,240	18.96%	111,748	21.42%	138,485	25.55%	162,111	24.93%	222,597	31.18%
Christianity	2,643	0.62%	4,674	0.98%	6,314	1.12%	6,486	1.07%	9,013	1.73%	9,999	1.84%	13,152	2.02%	17,695	2.48%
Zoroastrianism	717	0.17%	969	0.2%	1,408	0.25%	1,841	0.3%	2,202	0.42%	2,720	0.5%	3,364	0.52%	3,721	0.52%
Judaism	7	0%	106	0.02%	147	0.03%	381	0.06%	573	0.11%	661	0.12%	955	0.15%	1,053	0.15%
Jainism	—N/a	—N/a	9	0%	99	0.02%	126	0.02%	650	0.12%	1,118	0.21%	629	0.1%	3,215	0.45%
Buddhism	—N/a	—N/a	3	0%	2	0%	0	0%	21	0%	41	0.01%	53	0.01%	111	0.02%
Sikhism	—N/a	—N/a	—N/a	—N/a	132	0.02%	—N/a	—N/a	1,150	0.22%	2,543	0.47%	4,009	0.62%	7,589	1.06%
Tribal	—N/a	—N/a	—N/a	—N/a	—N/a	—N/a	—N/a	—N/a	30	0.01%	347	0.06%	172	0.03%	884	0.12%
Others	64	0.02%	0	0%	1	0%	280	0.05%	0	0%	0	0%	10	0%	0	0%
Total population	423,495	100%	478,688	100%	564,880	100%	607,828	100%	521,721	100%	542,065	100%	650,240	100%	713,900	100%
Note: British Sindh era district borders are not an exact match in the present-day due to various bifurcations to district borders — which since created new districts — throughout the region during the post-independence era that have taken into account population increases.
