= Fayaz Ali Butt =

Pakistani politician

Member of the Provincial Assembly of Sindh
- In office 13 August 2018 – 11 August 2023
- Constituency: PS-84 Dadu-II
- In office 29 May 2013 – 28 May 2017

Personal details
- Born: 2 May 1974 (age 51) Mehar Tehsil, Sindh, Pakistan
- Party: PPP (2013-present)

Fayaz Ali Butt is a Pakistani politician who had been a Member of the Provincial Assembly of Sindh from August 2008 to August 2023 and still serving as provincial assembly member

== Early life and education ==
He was born on 2 May 1974 in Mehar Taluka.

He has a degree of Master of Arts and a degree of Bachelor of Laws, both from Sindh University.

== Political career ==
He was elected to the Provincial Assembly of Sindh as a candidate of Pakistan Peoples Party (PPP) from Constituency PS-77 DADU-IV in the 2013 Pakistani general election. In August 2016, he was into Sindh's provincial cabinet of Chief Minister Syed Murad Ali Shah and was made Provincial Minister of Sindh for Public Health and Rural Development.

He was re-elected to Provincial Assembly of Sindh as a candidate of PPP from Constituency PS-84 (Dadu-II) in the 2018 Pakistani general election.
