= PS-80 Dadu-I =

Constituency of the Provincial Assembly of Sindh, Pakistan

- Constituency for the Provincial Assembly of Sindh
- Region: Khairpur Nathan Shah Tehsil, Mehar Tehsil (partly) of Dadu District
- Electorate: 255,545

Current constituency
- Member: Vacant
- Created from: PS-76 Dadu-VI (2002-2018); PS-83 Dadu-I (2018-2023)

PS-80 Dadu-I (پی ایس-80، دادو-1) is a constituency of the Provincial Assembly of Sindh.

== General elections 2024 ==
Provincial election 2024: PS-80 Dadu-I
Party	Candidate	Votes	%	±%
PPP	Abdul Aziz Junejo	52,301	51.30	
GDA	Karim Ali Jatoi	43,816	42.98	
Independent	Ghulam Qadir	1,592	1.56	
Others	Others (nine candidates)	4,245	4.16	
Turnout		107,625	42.12	
Total valid votes		101,954	94.73	
Rejected ballots		5,311	5.27	
Majority		8,485	8.32	
Registered electors		255,545		
PPP hold				

== General elections 2018 ==
Provincial election 2018: PS-83 Dadu-I
Party	Candidate	Votes	%	±%
PPP	Abdul Aziz Junejo	52,020	56.47	
PTI	Ahsan Ali Jatoi	38,030	41.29	
MMA	Muhammad Ameen Jamali	415	0.45	
Independent	Syed Asad Hyder	376	0.41	
Independent	Muhammad Ismail	296	0.32	
Independent	Ali Hassan	262	0.28	
Independent	Juniad Bashir Buriro	149	0.16	
Independent	Javeed Akhtar Khaskheli	104	0.11	
Independent	Ghulam Hyder	88	0.10	
PSP	Asghar Ali Sheikh	80	0.09	
PKI-Ch.Anwar	Waheed Ur Rehman Lakhar	61	0.07	
Independent	Asghar Ali	53	0.06	
Independent	Asadullah	48	0.05	
Independent	Gulzar	48	0.05	
PRHP	Ali Muhammad	46	0.05	
APML	Moulla Bux Leghari	30	0.03	
Independent	Khursheed Ahmed Khoharo	7	0.01	
Majority		13,990	15.18	
Valid ballots		92,113		
Rejected ballots		4,348		
Turnout		96,461		
Registered electors		196,683		
hold				

== General elections 2013 ==
Contesting candidates	Party affiliation	Votes polled

== General elections 2008 ==
Contesting candidates	Party affiliation	Votes polled

== See also ==
- PS-79 Jamshoro-III
- PS-81 Dadu-II
