= Federal capital =

Seat of a federation's government

A federal capital is a political entity, often a municipality or capital city, that serves as the seat of the federal government. A federal capital is typically a city that physically encompasses the offices and meeting places of its respective government, where its location and relationship to subnational states are fixed by law or federal constitution. Federal capitals may or may not be considered states in themselves, and either exercise significant political autonomy from the federation or are directly ruled by the national government located within their premises, as federal districts.

Federal capitals are often new creations. That is, they are not established in one of the existing state capitals (but they may well be a pre-existing city). They have not grown organically as capitals tend to do in unitary states. This is because the creation of a federation is a new political entity and it is usually necessary not to favour any one of the constituent state capitals by making it the federation capital. This is also the motivation behind the creation of federal capital territories as districts governed apart from the constituent state governments. It is especially important that the choice of federal capital be neutral in multi-ethnic states such as Nigeria.

Examples of well-known federal capitals include Washington, D.C., which is not part of any U.S. state but borders Maryland and Virginia; Berlin, which is a state of Germany in its own right and forms an enclave within the much larger state of Brandenburg; and the Australian Capital Territory, a territory of Australia which includes the capital city of Australia, Canberra.

Canada is the only federation in the world not to accord a special administrative subdivision to its capital. Rather, Ottawa is merely another municipality in the Province of Ontario. The Canadian government does designate the Ottawa area as the National Capital Region, although this term merely represents the jurisdictional area of the government agency that administers federally owned lands and buildings, and is not an actual political unit. The City of Ottawa is governed as any other city in Ontario would be.

== Early capitals of the United States ==
During and immediately after the American Revolution, eight cities served in turn as the capital of the new country:

- Philadelphia, Pennsylvania served at various times as the home of the Continental Congress, then as capital of the US under the Articles of Confederation and from 1790 to 1800 while Washington, D.C. was being built.
- Baltimore, Maryland late 1776–1777.
- Lancaster, Pennsylvania September 1777.
- York, Pennsylvania September 1777–June 1778.
- Princeton, New Jersey Summer 1783.
- Annapolis, Maryland November 1783–August 1784.
- Trenton, New Jersey November–December 1784.
- New York, New York 1785–1790.

== List of federal capitals ==
=== Current ===
Country	Federal Capital
Argentina	Autonomous City of Buenos Aires
Austria	Vienna
Australia	Canberra, Australian Capital Territory
Belgium	Brussels-Capital Region
Bosnia and Herzegovina	Sarajevo
Brazil	Federal District of Brasília
Canada	Ottawa
Comoros	Moroni
Ethiopia	Addis Ababa
Germany	Berlin
India	New Delhi
Iraq	Baghdad
Malaysia	Kuala Lumpur and Putrajaya
Mexico	Mexico City
Micronesia, Federated States of	Palikir
Nepal	Kathmandu
Nigeria	Federal Capital Territory of Abuja
Pakistan	Islamabad
Russia	Moscow
Saint Kitts and Nevis	Basseterre
Somalia	Mogadishu
South Sudan	Juba
Sudan	Khartoum
Switzerland	Bern
United Arab Emirates	Abu Dhabi
United States	Washington, D.C.
Venezuela	Caracas

=== Former and historical ===
Country	Former and historical Capital
Brazil	Rio de Janeiro
Federal Republic of Central America	Guatemala City, then San Salvador
United States of Colombia	Bogotá
Confederate States of America	Richmond, Virginia
Czechoslovakia	Prague
United States of Indonesia	Jakarta
Kingdom of Libya	Tripoli and Benghazi
Mali Federation	Dakar
Nigeria	Lagos
Pakistan	Karachi
Rhodesia and Nyasaland	Salisbury
Soviet Union	Moscow
West Germany	Bonn
West Indies Federation	Chaguaramas
Yugoslavia and Serbia and Montenegro	Belgrade
