= Khairpur Nathan Shah =

K.N.Shah
- City
- Khairpur Nathan Shah
- Location of Khairpur Nathan Shah K.N.Shah (Pakistan) K.N.Shah (South Asia)
- Coordinates: 27.1°N 67.73°E
- Country: Pakistan
- Province: Sindh
- District: Dadu District

Government
  - MPA: Zubair Ahmed Junejo
  - MNA: Irfan Zafar Laghari
- Elevation: 29 m (95 ft)

Population (2023 Census)
  - Total: 50,786
- Time zone: UTC+5 (PST)

Khairpur Nathan Shah is a city in Dadu District in the Sindh province of Pakistan. It is situated west of the Indus River.

== History ==
The administrative history of the area now comprising Khairpur Nathan Shah Tehsil is directly linked to the formation of Dadu District. When Dadu District was established in April 1931 by the British Raj, through the bifurcation of portions of Larkana and Karachi Districts, it initially comprised seven talukas (sub-districts). Among these original seven talukas was formally recognized as Kakar Taluka.

A significant administrative change occurred after the independence of Pakistan in 1947. At this point, the headquarters and the name of Kakar Taluka were officially replaced by Khairpur Nathan Shah (K.N. Shah). This means that the administrative area previously known as Kakar Taluka formally transitioned to Khairpur Nathan Shah Tehsil during the post-independence period. The historical area of Kakar continues to be recognized as a "Deh" (a revenue village or sub-division of a taluka) within the present-day Khairpur Nathan Shah Tehsil, confirming its geographical connection.

The city of Khairpur Nathan Shah itself is named after the Sufi saint Hazrat Nathan Shah. The town holds historical significance for its contributions to democratic movements in Pakistan, including the Movement for the Restoration of Democracy (MRD) in 1983, during which several individuals from the area lost their lives.

== Geography and Climate ==
Khairpur Nathan Shah Tehsil covers an area of approximately 2,583 square kilometers (997 sq mi). Its coordinates are 27.1°N 67.73°E. The tehsil's landscape is typical of the Indus River plains, characterized by fertile agricultural land. The region experiences a hot desert climate (Köppen climate classification: BWh), with extremely hot summers and mild winters.

The area is irrigated by canals originating from the Sukkur Barrage, supporting extensive agriculture. Main crops include cotton, wheat, rice, and sugarcane.

== Demographics ==
Population

Historical population
Year	Pop.	±%
1972	7,655	—
1981	10,540	+37.7%
1998	26,012	+146.8%
2017	41,320	+58.8%
2023	50,786	+22.9%

As of the 2023 Census, Khairpur Nathan Shah city population was 50,786 residents.

Languages

Languages of Khairpur Nathan Shah city (2023 Census)
1. Sindhi (99.8%)
2. Others (0.20%)

The primary language spoken is Sindhi.

== Administration ==
Khairpur Nathan Shah Tehsil is one of the four administrative subdivisions (talukas) of Dadu District. It is represented in both the National Assembly of Pakistan and the Provincial Assembly of Sindh. The specific representatives are currently Abdul Aziz Junejo (MPA) and Irfan Zafar Laghari (MNA).

The tehsil comprises numerous villages and Union Councils that fall under its administrative purview.

== Economy ==
The economy of Khairpur Nathan Shah Tehsil is predominantly agricultural. The presence of rice husking mills and other agro-based industries contributes significantly to local employment and economic activity. Livestock farming is also a major sub-sector of the local economy.

== Facilities and Infrastructure ==
The city of Khairpur Nathan Shah, as the tehsil headquarters, provides various public facilities, including a civil hospital, a civil court, police stations, and educational institutions ranging from primary schools to colleges. Banking services are available through branches of major banks.

== Notable people ==
- Raaz Nathanshahi (1947-2019), creative

== See also ==
- Dadu District
- Tehsils of Pakistan
- Sindh
