= Mehar Taluka =

Mehar Taluka تعلقا ميھڙ
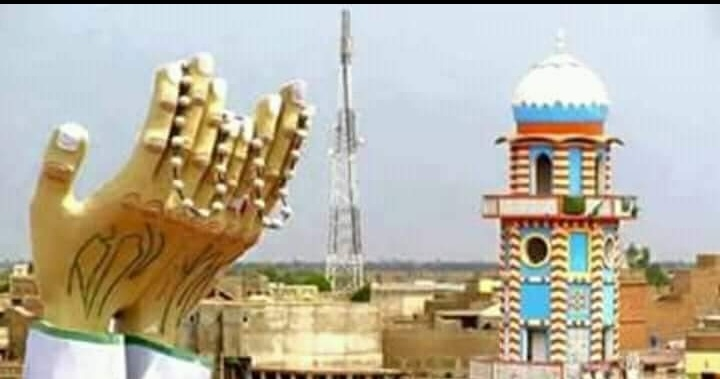
- میہڑ

- Tehsil Mehar highlighted in red
- Coordinates: 27°10′42″N 67°49′25″E
- Country: Pakistan
- Province: Sindh
- District: Dadu District
- Established: 1848; 178 years ago
- Founder: British Raj

Government
  - Deputy Commissioner Dadu: Jawad Ali Soomro
  - Constituency: Constituencies | NA-228 Dadu-I, PS-80 Dadu-I (partly), PS-81 Dadu-II

Area
  - Total: 928 km^{2} (358 sq mi)
- Elevation: 43 m (141 ft)
- Highest elevation: 50 m (160 ft)
- Lowest elevation: 37 m (121 ft)

Population (2023)
  - Total: 520,559
  - Density: 560.95/km^{2} (1,452.9/sq mi)
- Time zone: UTC+05:00 (PKT)
  - Summer (DST): DST is not observed
- ZIP Code: 76330
- NWD (area) code: 025
- ISO 3166 code: PK-SD

Mehar Taluka (Sindhi: ميهڙ ,Urdu: میہڑ) is an administrative subdivision (taluka) of Dadu District of Hyderabad Division in the province of Sindh in Pakistan. According to the 2023 Pakistani census, Mehar Taluka had a population of 520,559. It has an area of 928 km² and is divided into 20 union councils. It has an overall literacy rate of 43.05% (Note: this accounts only for people aged 10 or above). Mehar is mostly an agrarian region supported by the Western Nara Canal network. Mehar has a developing network of educational institutions. And a rich history, as it was part of Bombay Presidency. Mehar is known for production of henna (mehndi) and some plants like Babul. Moreover, Mehar has also suffered from floods in 2022 and 2010 which impacted the region's economy, healthcare, agriculture, livestock.

== History ==
Mehar Taluka was created during British rule with the town of Mehar as its headquarters. The taluka, along with the rest of Sindh, was for a time part of the Bombay Presidency of British India.

When it became a taluka under British rule in 1848, Mehar was part of Larkana. It remained as part of Larkana until Dadu became a new district in 1931.

Historically designating a landscape rich in livestock and grazing grounds along the Kirthar foothills. Human settlements in the area were built near the natural water sources.

Before British rule, during the 17th and 18th centuries, the region of modern Mehar Taluka was a frontier administrative and agricultural zone under the rule of the Kalhora and was heavily shaped by the socio-religious influence of the Mianwal Movement championed by figures like Mian Naseer Muhammad Kalhoro and later the Talpur dynasties of Sindh dominated the region. Mehar is situated near the foothills of the Kirthar Mountains. It historically connected upper Indus plains with trade routes stretching towards Balochistan. Local governance during that period was dependent on tribal alliances and localized revenue collection, with most of the population settling along the natural water channels.

The Imperial Gazetteer of India, written over a century ago during British rule, describes the taluka as follows:

It was once a taluka in Sindh province's Larkana District "Mehar.- Tāluka of Lārkāna District, Sindh, Bombay, lying between elev 162ft, with an area of 328 square miles. The population in 1901 was 58,434, compared with 48,320 in 1891. The tāluka contains 64 villages, of which Mehar is the headquarters. The density, 178 persons per square mile, greatly exceeds the District average. The land revenue and cesses in 1903-4 amounted to 2.8 lakhs. The tāluka is irrigated by the Western Nāra and one of its feeders, the stable crop is jowār and rice. Prior to the floods of 1874 Mehar was fertile, but the water has now become brackish and all gardens have perished. Cultivation near the hills on the west depends entirely on rainfall."

== Demographics ==
Languages of Mehar Taluka (2023 Pakistani census)
1. Sindhi (99.7%)
2. Urdu (0.09%)
3. Pashto (0.06%)
4. Brahui (0.05%)
5. Punjabi (0.02%)
6. Hindko (0.02%)
7. Others (0.16%)

According to the 2023 Pakistani census, there were 519,238 people who spoke Sindhi, 477 who spoke Urdu, 306 who spoke Pashto, 264 spoke Brahui, 82 spoke Punjabi, 82 spoke Hindko, 20 who spoke Balochi, 5 who spoke Saraiki, 1 who spoke Kashmiri and 84 others.

== Administrative divisions ==
Mehar Taluka (Sindhi: ميهڙ) is administratively subdivided into 20 Union Councils and 47 deh (revenue units)

Union Council (UC)	Principal Village / Hub	Associated Revenue Dehs & Localities
Mehar	Mehar (Headquarters)	Deh Mehar, urban revenue tracts, Abad No. 2
Balishah	Balishah	Deh Balishah, Village Kothi Khokhar, Lakhiari
Bothro	Bothro	Deh Bothro (Botharo), Daud Kandhra, Kandhara
Baledai	Baledai	Deh Baledai, surrounding canal-fed zones
Betto	Betto	Deh Betto, Butt Serai, Kothi Sodhari
Fareedabad	Fareedabad	Deh Fareedabad, historic settlement tracts
Gahi Mahessar	Gahi Mahessar	Deh Gahi Mahesar, Wah Gahi, Band Gahi
Kolachi	Kolachi	Deh Kolachi, Kinaro Kakol, western canal tracts
Khan Jo Goth	Khan Jo Goth	Local settlement revenue tracts
Mandwani	Mandwani	Deh Mandwani, Mangwatni
Nau Goth	Nau Goth	Nau Goth revenue and residential tracts
Qazi Aarif	Qazi Aarif	Deh Qazi Aarif and local farming communities
Radhan	Radhan	Deh Radhan (Radhan), Ghari Jageer
Shah Panjo	Shah Panjo	Deh Shah Panjo, Masoo Sahar, Challo, Charo
Tharari Mohabat	Tharari Mohabat	Deh Tharari Muhabbat, surrounding agrarian zones
Sobho Khan Magsi	Magsi	Deh Magsi, rural canal-fed farming tracts
Thohro Chandio	Thohro Chandio	Local settlements along irrigation networks
Sindhi Butra	Sindhi Butra	Deh Sindhi Butra, Bhand Mari
Goth Qaim Shah	Goth Qaim Shah	Deh Kari Qasim Shah, Qaim Shah revenue tracts
Goth Molvi Siddique	Goth Molvi Siddique	Local rural community and adjacent revenue dehs

== Locality ==
Mehar is a town in Dadu District. It is administered by the Government of Sindh. It is subdivided into 20 Union Councils. The most prominent local political figures include the members of the Jatoi family and the former provincial minister Fayaz Ali Butt. Betto is the hometown of former chief minister of Sindh Liaquat Ali Jatoi, and village Butt Serai is the hometown of provincial minister Fayaz Ali Butt.

Mehar Taluka's 20 Union Councils are divided into two types. Some are the fertile eastern canal plains along the Western Nara Canal, supported by commercial and transit hubs such as Mehar Town and Radhan, and the western Kachho belt stretching towards the Kirthar Mountains. While urban administration centers around Mehar municipal town, rural local governance and land records are organized across 47 revenue dehs.

== Economy and Agriculture ==
The economy of Mehar is mostly agrarian, with most of the people in it directly or indirectly relying on agricultural commerce. The fertile land of Mehar is supported by the extensive network of canals supplied by the Indus River.

=== Agriculture and irrigation ===
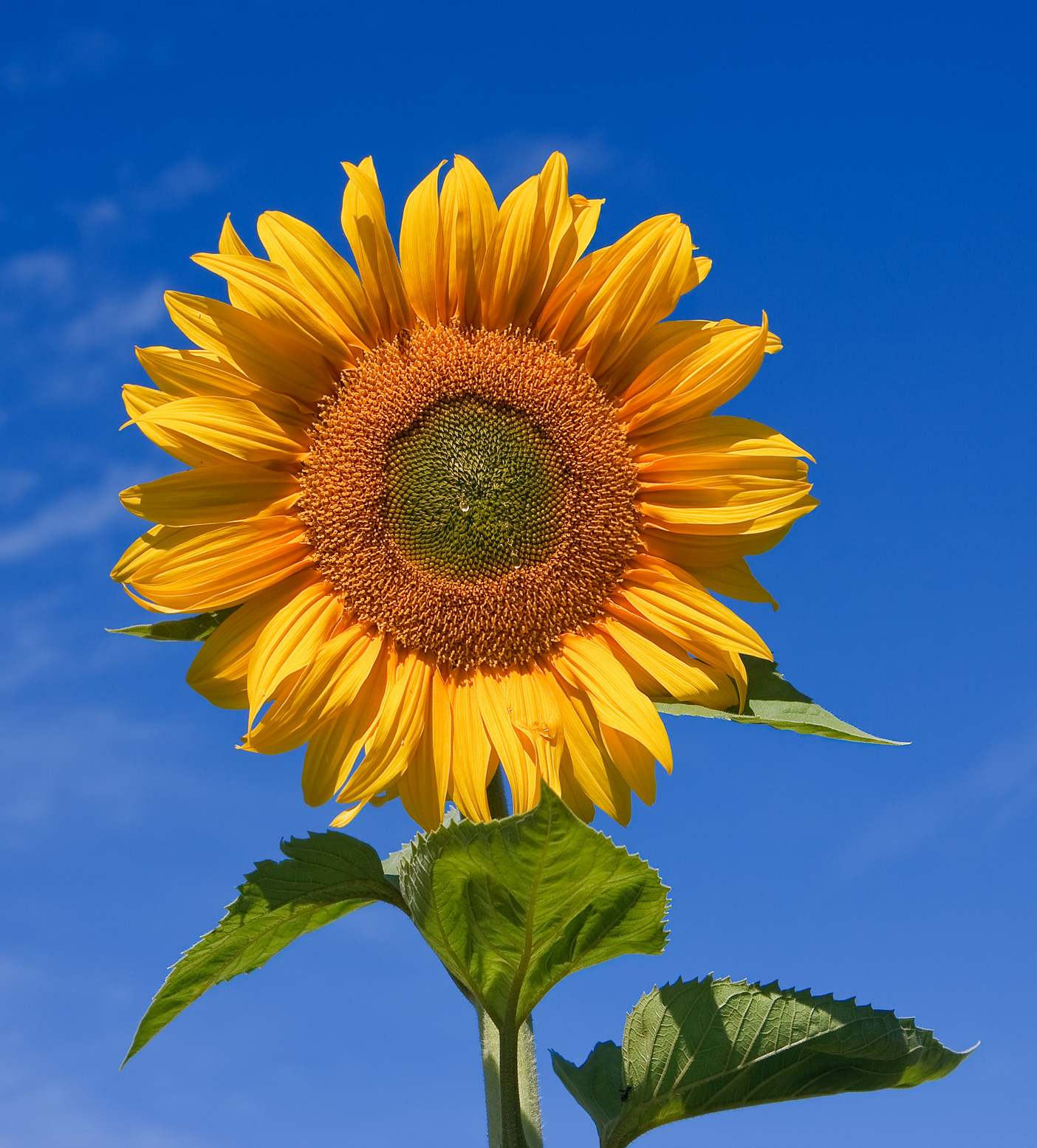
Sunflower

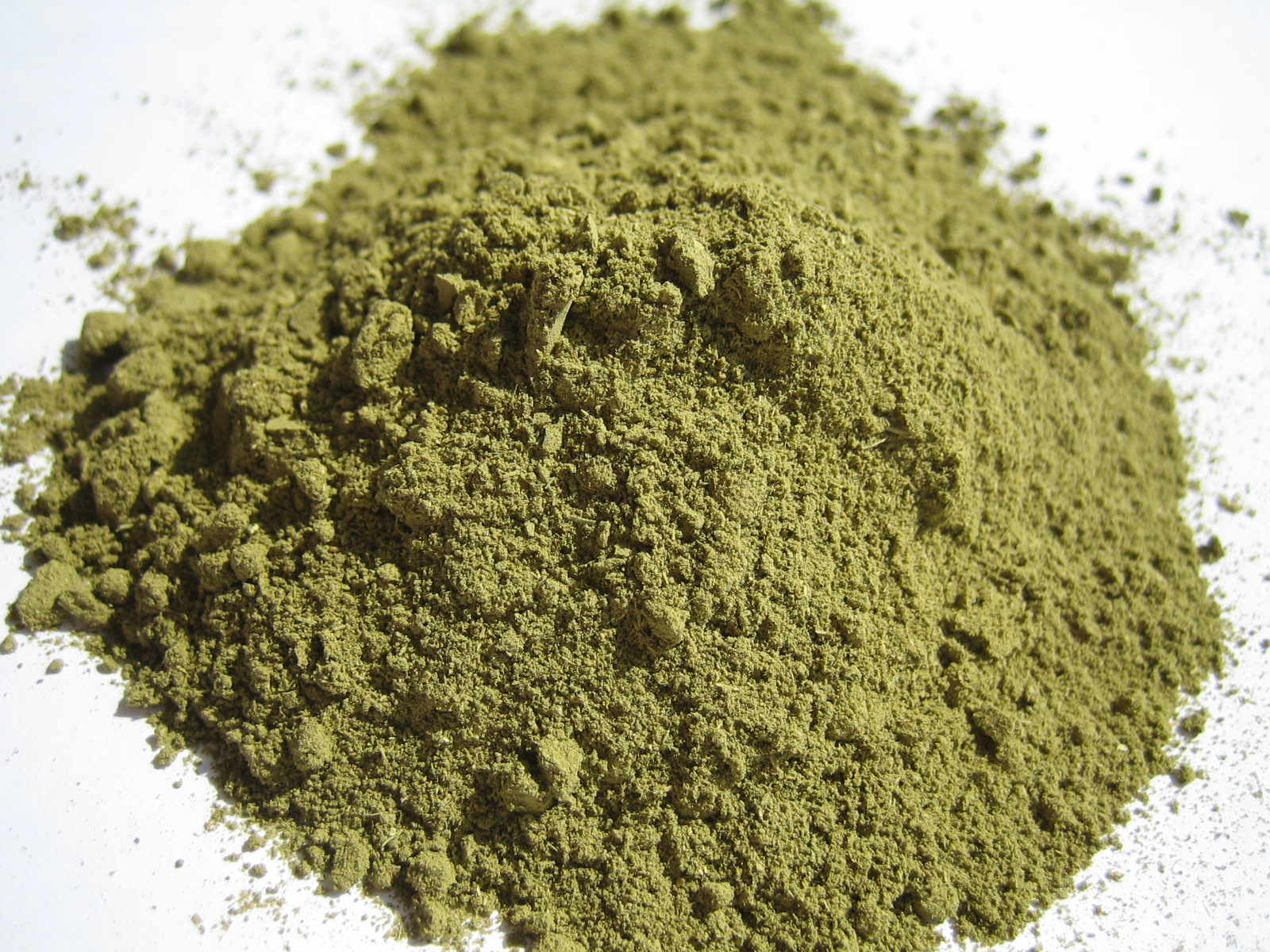
Henna (mehndi)

Agriculture is the main source of income of many residents of Mehar Taluka. The primary water source sustaining the whole region's agricultural base is the Western Nara Canal, with the Kakol Waah acting as a secondary water source. Because of this canal system, Mehar is able to produce both winter and summer crops:

Major crops: Rice and wheat are the most commonly grown crops of the region. However, sorghum (Jowar), common sunflower and sugarcane are also cultivated across the region.

Specialty crops: Mehar is known for its Henna (mehndi) and has become a major hub for the cultivation, processing, and supplying of henna in the region.

Challenges: The region is frequently affected by severe flooding, heavy rainfall, soil salinity, and the recurring water shortages at the tails of irrigation canals.

== Education ==
According to the 2023 Pakistan census, Mehar had a population of 520,559 people, out of whom 43.05% were literate. Of the 152,662 total literate individuals, 92,111 were male and 60,543 were female; also there were 8 transgender people, indicating a notable gender gap. Education in the sub-district is managed by the Sindh Education and Literacy Department; it has a network of public primary, middle, and high schools across the 20 union councils of Mehar.

For intermediate and higher education, the region has public institutions like the Government Degree College Mehar, which offers various academic programmes in pre-engineering, pre-medical, and humanities. Moreover, Mehar has multiple private schools and vocational training centres. The literacy and enrolment rates across the region have been improving.

List of some public institutions in Mehar

1. Government Boys Degree College, Mehar
2. Government Girls Degree College, Mehar
3. Government High School No. 1, Mehar

Aside from these institutions, there is no full-fledged public university in Mehar and students in the taluka often travel to pursue their further studies at the University of Sindh (Mohtarma Benazir Bhutto Shaheed Campus, Dadu) or some may look towards Jamshoro or Hyderabad to study in Mehran University of Engineering and Technology (MUET) or University of Sindh Jamshoro.

== Geography and Climate ==
Mehar Taluka lies in the central part of Sindh Province and forms part of the lower Indus plain. The region is mainly flat terrain and agricultural land. The area has a hot, arid climate, typical of much of inland Sindh. Summers in Mehar are usually very hot, reaching as high as 47 °C, while winters are usually mild. Most of the heavy monsoon rainfall occurs during July and August, although precipitation varies from year to year. The taluka, which covers 928 km², has a landscape consisting mainly of cultivated fields and rural settlements. The taluka has an average elevation of about 43 metres above sea level. Mehar remains vulnerable to flash floods originating from the western hill torrents.

Vegetation of Mehar

Because of the geography of Mehar, near villages, old sections of town, and canal banks, you will often find sturdy trees such as Babul (Acacia nilotica), Neem (Azadirachta indica) which is famous in the region for its cooling shade and medicinal leaves, Kandi (Prosopis cineraria), a hardy desert tree that can survive severe droughts and feeds local livestock.

In the west of Mehar, there are rocky hills and dry stream beds. The plants are tough and need a limited quantity of water to survive. More names of plants are: Ber (Ziziphus mauritiana), Ak (Calotropis procera), and Khumbat (Acacia senegal). These are the plant species found in Mehar.

Flood 2022 sindh

The 2022 Floods

Mehar was severely hit by the floods in 2022 along with many of its neighbouring towns like Khairpur Nathan Shah (K.N. Shah). The 2022 floods submerged large parts of Sindh, when torrential monsoon rains along with overflowing water from Main Nara Valley (MNV) Drain and overflowing hill torrents such as the Gaaj River, which flows from the Kirthar Mountains. As a result, massive parts of Mehar taluka and hundreds of surrounding villages were under 10 to 12 feet of flood water. Massive numbers of people were displaced and local authorities scrambled to build and strengthen protective ring bunds to save the town from complete inundation.

The Super Floods of 2010 (Detailed)

The massive 2010 floods in Mehar Taluka began in late July 2010 due to the sheer volume of monsoon rains, culminating on August 6, 2010, when a massive breach occurred at the Tori Bund in northern sindh. This water that surged down the Indus Basin. By the middle of August, the first major flood peak at Guddu was recorded on 8–9 August, at approximately 1.149 million cusecs; Sukkur recorded approximately 1.131 million cusecs on 9–11 August.

Flood of 2010 in sindh

As a huge flood peak exceeding 1.1 million cusecs passed through upper barrages, Mehar Taluka was trapped in a situation of violent flash floods descending from the western Kirthar Mountains range via seasonal torrents like the Gaaj River.

By late August and early September 2010, secondary barricades gave way, submerging major portions of Mehar Taluka along with neighboring Taluka Khairpur Nathan Shah under 8 to 12 feet of water. Rural Union Councils like Radhan, Fareedabad, and lastly Betto were affected. Mud-brick homes, common in the region, dissolved into slurry, and standing crops on more than 224,589 acres were wiped out by the floods. Around 90% of Mehar city's population had moved to higher ground, around 2,000 people were stranded, and more than 2,500 flood survivors had been transferred to Mehar city. Thousands displaced in rural Dadu and shortages of food and medicines. Gastroenteritis and malaria were among the reported illnesses.

== Healthcare ==
Healthcare infrastructure in Mehar is mainly managed by the public sector under the Government of Sindh’s Health Department; it also has multiple private clinics and pharmacies. Public medical services are served by the Taluka Headquarters (THQ) Hospital, Mehar, which is the principal secondary-care and first-level referral facility for the sub-district's population of over 520,000 people and has 35 bed. In all 20 union councils of the taluka, main healthcare system is extended through a decentralized network of facilities including Rural Health Centers (RHCs) and Basic Health Units (BHUs), which largely handle the public care, immunizations, and primary outpatient consultations.

Public healthcare facilities handle heavy patient numbers daily, treating thousands of outpatients monthly. The region is mainly affected by seasonal and environmental conditions. Outpatient departments (OPDs) experience massive inflows of patients, who are ill because of waterborne and gastrointestinal illnesses (such as acute diarrhoea, typhoid, and gastroenteritis), cases of these illnesses typically spike during monsoon seasons and post-flood periods. Moreover, vector-borne diseases, particularly malaria and dengue fever are also found in the region..

== Transport ==
Road transport is the principal means of transportation in Mehar Taluka. It is connected to its surrounding towns through a web of roads. The Larkana-Mehar route, using Provincial Highway S-07, connects Mehar with Larkana via Mohenjo-daro area. Local roads also connect Mehar to Radhan, Faridabad, Shah Panjo and other rural settlements across the taluka.

The Mehar-Radhan Road is an important local road connecting Mehar with Radhan and with other villages. There is also a road linking Mehar-Radhan with Village Butt Serai. Many roads link Mehar with Gahi Mahesar, Peroz Shah, Faridabad and nearby villages. These roads provide access to agricultural areas, settlements and local markets.

Rail transport is served to Mehar through the Radhan railway station, situated in Radhan. The station lies on the Kotri-Attock railway and it has station code RDH. The railway line provides a connection towards Kotri Junction and the northern parts of the country. Shah Panjo Halt is also a neighbouring station towards Kotri Junction.
