= Liaquat Ali Jatoi =

Pakistani politician

Liaquat Ali Jatoi لیاقت علی جتوئی

25th Chief Minister of Sindh
- In office 22 February 1997 – 30 October 1998
- Preceded by: Mumtaz Bhutto
- Succeeded by: Governor's rule

Minister for Finance Excise and Taxation
- In office 1990–1995

Minister of Industry and Production
- In office 2002–2003
- President: Pervez Musharraf
- Prime Minister: Zafarullah Khan Jamali
- Constituency: NA-233 (Dadu-I)

Minister for Water and Power (Pakistan)
- In office 30 June 2004 – 15 November 2007
- President: Pervez Musharraf
- Prime Minister: Shaukat Aziz
- Constituency: NA-233 (Dadu-I)

Personal details
- Born: 5 January 1948 (age 78) Beto Jatoi, Sind, Pakistan
- Party: GDA (2023-present)
- Other political affiliations: Sindh Awami Ittehad (2012; 2014-2017); PMLN (2012-2014); PTI (2017-2023)
- Relations: Ghulam Mustafa Jatoi (uncle); Ghulam Murtaza Khan Jatoi (cousin)
- Parent: Abdul Hameed Khan Jatoi (father)
- Education: Sindh University (BA and MA)

Liaquat Ali Jatoi (Urdu: ﻟﻴﺎﻗﺖ ﻋﻠﻰ ﺟﺗﻮﺋﻰ, Sindhi: لياقت علي جتوئي ; born 5 January 1948) is a Pakistani politician who was Chief Minister of Sindh from 1997 until the imposition of Governor’s Rule in 1998.

== Political career ==
Liaquat Jatoi was first elected to the National Assembly in 1977. However, this Assembly was dissolved by General Muhammad Zia-ul-Haq within a few weeks of the elections. During Muhammad Zia-ul-Haq's rule, Jatoi served as member of the Federal Council (Majlis-e-Shoora) in 1980–81.

Jatoi later on participated in the elections of 1985, 1990 and 1997, when he was elected to the Sindh Assembly as a Member. In 1990, he was chosen as the Provincial Minister for Finance, Excise and Taxation, Government of Sindh. This was the beginning of his alliance with Pakistan Muslim League (N) headed by Nawaz Sharif.

After the elections of 1997, Liaquat Ali Jatoi was chosen as the Chief Minister of Sindh. He served in this position until the end of October 1998, when Governor's Rule was imposed in Sindh due to the law and order situation.

In 2002, Jatoi was elected to the National Assembly and was inducted into the Federal Cabinet as a Minister. Initially he held the portfolio of Minister of Industries, and was later on made the Minister for Water and Power.

Dadu District emerged in the period of 1998–2007, with Jatoi having no defeat in the history of his politics. However, in 2007, when Benazir Bhutto was assassinated, protests took place all over Sindh and Jatoi's house in Dadu was set on fire by the Pakistan Peoples Party activists. Jatoi lost his seat to the Pakistan Peoples Party, due to the sympathy of the people of Sindh on the assassination of Mohtarma Benazir Bhutto.

During the exile period of Nawaz Sharif, Liaquat Jatoi formed Sindh Awami Ittehad and merged the party with Pakistan Muslim League (N) when Sharif was back in Pakistan.

However, in the General Elections of 2013, Jatoi contested elections on the ticket of Pakistan Muslim League (N), where he was defeated by a massive margin of 45000 votes by the son of former PPP Federal Minister, Haji Zafar Ali Khan Laghari, Imran Zafar Laghari.

In April 2017, Jatoi joined the Pakistan Tehreek-e-Insaf political party.

In the General Elections of 2018 and 2024, Jatoi was defeated on both occasions by Irfan Zafar Laghari, son of former Pakistan Peoples Party Federal Minister Haji Zafar Ali Khan Laghari.

== Footnotes ==
Political offices
Preceded by Mumtaz Bhutto	Chief Minister of Sindh; 1997–1998	Succeeded by Ali Mohammad Mahar
