= Religion in Pakistan =

Religion in Pakistan as of the 2026 census conducted by the Pakistan Bureau of Statistics (PBS)
1. Sunni Islam (62.7%)
2. Shia Islam (7.94%)
3. Agnostic (7.58%)
4. Atheist (6.72%)
5. Undeclared (6.11%)
6. Other Muslims (2.68%)
7. Hinduism (2.42%)
8. Christianity (2.11%)
9. Sikhism (1.02%)
10. Other Religions (0.73%)

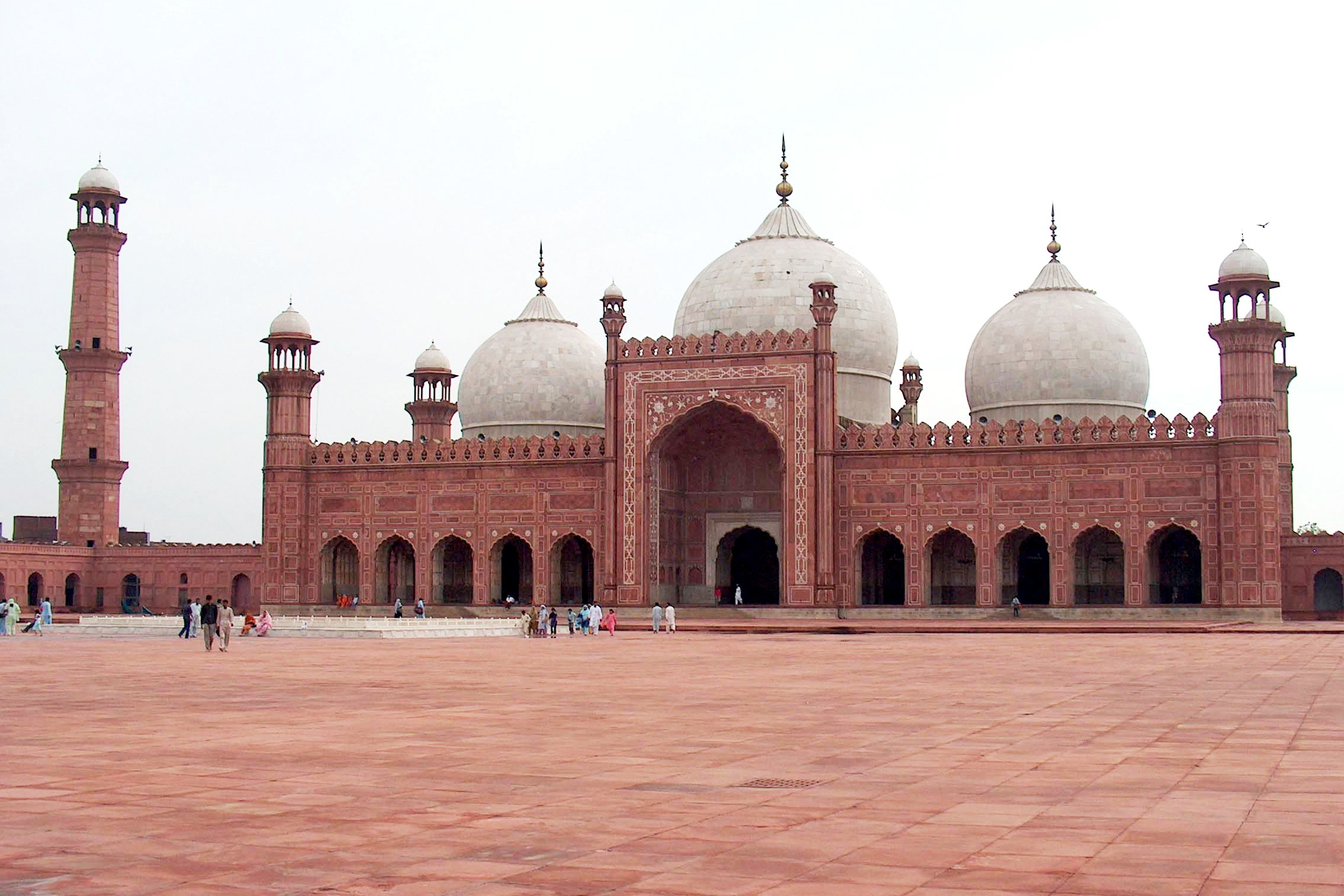
The Badshahi Mosque in Lahore was built during the Mughal Empire

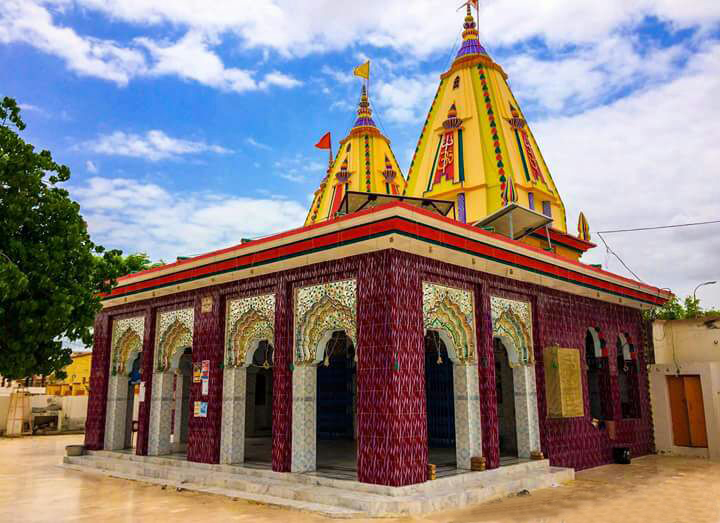
Prabhunath Hindu Temple in Mithi is dedicated to deities Shiva and Parvati

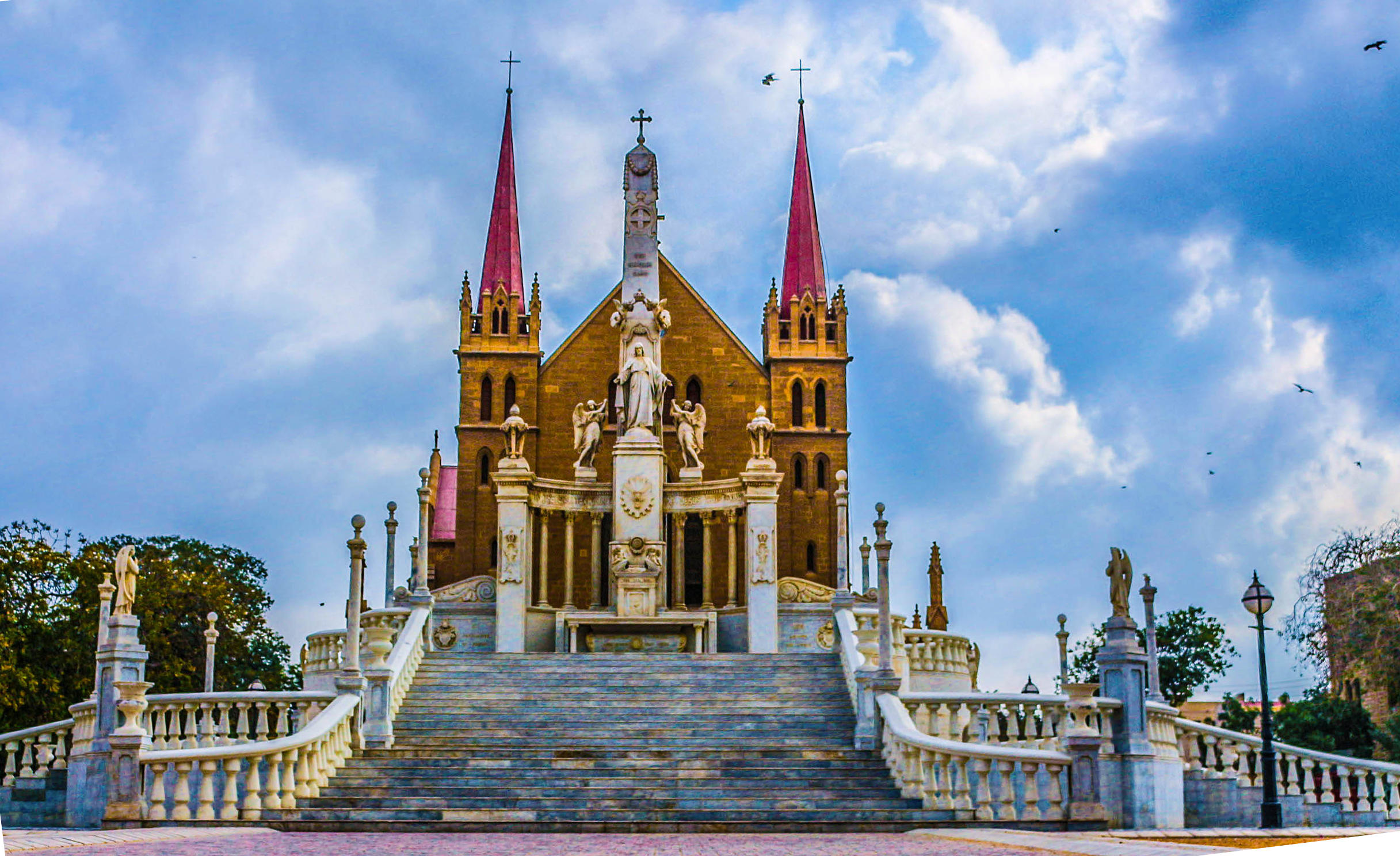
St. Patrick's Cathedral is the seat of the Roman Catholic Archdiocese of Karachi

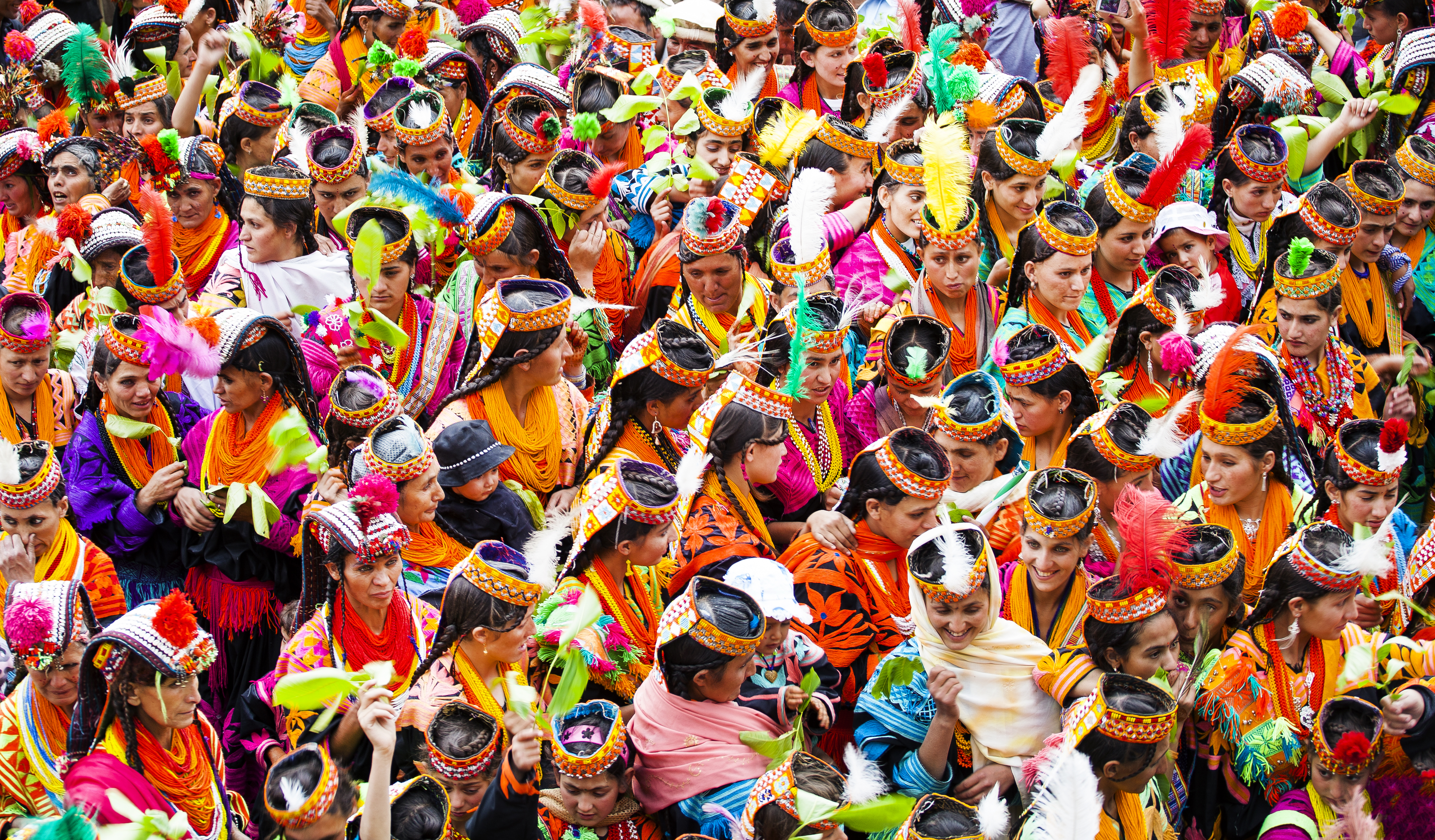
The animistic Kalash people at Chilam Joshi festival in Chitral, whose religion resembles ancient Hinduism

The official religion of Pakistan is Islam, as enshrined by article 2 of the Constitution, and is practiced by a majority of 73.71% of the Pakistani population. The remaining 26.28% do not follow a religion Atheism and Agnosticism or are followers of Hinduism, Christianity, Ahmadiyya (considered non-Muslims as per the Constitution of Pakistan), Sikhism and Zoroastrianism.

Muslims comprise a number of sects, with the majority estimated at 90% practicing Sunni Islam, while the rest mainly practice Shia Islam. The majority of Sunnis follow the Hanafi school of jurisprudence, while a minority belong to the Ahl-i Hadith school of thought. Most Pakistani Shia Muslims belong to the Twelver Islamic law school, with significant minority groups who practice Ismailism, which is composed of Nizari (Aga Khanis), Mustaali, Dawoodi Bohra, and Sulaymani.

Before the arrival of Islam in the 8th century, the region that makes up Pakistan was home to a number of faiths, including Hinduism, Buddhism, Jainism, and Zoroastrianism.

== Equal rights ==
Khawaja Nazimuddin, Pakistan's second Prime Minister, argued against equal rights for all citizens in an Islamic state. The Constitution of Pakistan establishes Islam as the state religion, and provides that all citizens have the right to profess, practice and propagate their religion subject to law, public order, and morality. The Constitution also states that all laws are to conform with the injunctions of Islam as laid down in the Quran and Sunnah.

The Constitution limits the political rights of Pakistan's non-Muslims. Only Muslims are allowed to become the President or the Prime Minister. Only Muslims are allowed to serve as judges in the Federal Shariat Court, which has the power to strike down any law deemed un-Islamic, though its judgments can be overruled by the Supreme Court of Pakistan. However, non-Muslims have served as judges in the High Courts and Supreme Court. In 2019, Naveed Amir, a Christian member of the National Assembly moved a bill to amend the article 41 and 91 of the Constitution that would allow non-Muslims to become Prime Minister and President of Pakistan. However, Pakistan's parliament blocked the bill.

The main principles of Human rights in the Pakistani constitution were incorporated in its fundamental rights which were granted under various articles of 20, 21, 22, 25, 26, 27, 36 & 38 of the constitution –

(a) Article 20 : Freedom to profess religion and to manage religious institutions.

(b) Article 21 : Safeguard against taxation for purposes of any particular religion.

(c) Article 22 : Safeguards as to educational institutions in respect of religion, etc.

(d) Article 25 : Equality of citizens.

(e) Article 26 : Non-discrimination in respect of access to public places.

(f) Article 27 : Safeguard against discrimination in services.

(g) Article 36 : Protection of Minorities.

(h) Article 38 : Promotion of social and economic well-being of all the people.

== Demographics of religion in Pakistan ==
=== Background ===
Religious groups in Pakistan (1901–2023) (Note: can someone please update the table with 2026 census data thank you.)
Religious group	1901 census (Note: 1901 figure taken from census data by combining the total population of all administrative divisions that compose the region of contemporary Pakistan, including Punjab, (Note: 1901 figure taken from census data by combining the total population of all districts (Lahore, Sialkot, Gujranwala, Gujrat, Shahpur, Jhelum, Rawalpindi, Mianwali, Montgomery, Lyallpur (inscribed as the Chenab Colony on the 1901 census), Jhang, Multan, Muzaffargargh, Dera Ghazi Khan), one tehsil (Shakargarh – then part of Gurdaspur District), one princely state (Bahawalpur), and one tract (Biloch Trans–Frontier) in Punjab Province, British India that ultimately fell on the western side of the Radcliffe Line. See 1901 census data here: Immediately following the partition of India in 1947, these districts and tract would ultimately make up the subdivision of West Punjab, which also later included Bahawalpur. The state that makes up this region in the contemporary era is Punjab, Pakistan.) Sindh, (Note: 1901 figure taken from census data by combining the total population of all districts (Karachi, Hyderabad, Shikarpur, Tharparkar, Upper Sind Frontier), and one princely state (Khairpur), in Sindh Province, British India. See 1901 census data here:) Khyber Pakhtunkhwa, Balochistan, Azad Jammu and Kashmir, (Note: 1901 figure taken from census data by combining the total population of two districts (Bhimber and Muzaffarabad) and one Jagir (Poonch) in the Princely State of Jammu and Kashmir that ultimately would be administered by Pakistan, in the contemporary self-administrative territory of Azad Jammu and Kashmir. See 1901 census data here:) and Gilgit–Baltistan. (Note: 1901 figure taken from census data using the total population of Gilgit District in the Princely State of Jammu and Kashmir that ultimately would be administered by Pakistan, in the contemporary administrative territory of Gilgit–Baltistan. See 1901 census data here:))		1911 census (Note: 1911 figure taken from census data by combining the total population of all administrative divisions that compose the region of contemporary Pakistan, including Punjab, (Note: 1911 figure taken from census data by combining the total population of all districts (Lahore, Sialkot, Gujranwala, Gujrat, Shahpur, Jhelum, Rawalpindi, Attock, Mianwali, Montgomery, Lyallpur, Jhang, Multan, Muzaffargargh, Dera Ghazi Khan), one tehsil (Shakargarh – then part of Gurdaspur District), one princely state (Bahawalpur), and one tract (Biloch Trans–Frontier) in Punjab Province, British India that ultimately fell on the western side of the Radcliffe Line. See 1911 census data here: Immediately following the partition of India in 1947, these districts and tract would ultimately make up the subdivision of West Punjab, which also later included Bahawalpur. The state that makes up this region in the contemporary era is Punjab, Pakistan.) Sindh, (Note: 1911 figure taken from census data by combining the total population of all districts (Hyderabad, Karachi, Larkana, Sukkur, Tharparkar, Upper Sind Frontier), and one princely state (Khairpur), in Sindh Province, British India. See 1911 census data here:) Khyber Pakhtunkhwa, Balochistan, Azad Jammu and Kashmir, (Note: 1911 figure taken from census data by combining the total population of two districts (Mirpur and Muzaffarabad) and one Jagir (Poonch) in the Princely State of Jammu and Kashmir that ultimately would be administered by Pakistan, in the contemporary self-administrative territory of Azad Jammu and Kashmir. See 1911 census data here:) and Gilgit–Baltistan. (Note: 1911 figure taken from census data by combining the total population of Gilgit District and the Frontier Ilaqas in the Princely State of Jammu and Kashmir that ultimately would be administered by Pakistan, in the contemporary administrative territory of Gilgit–Baltistan. See 1911 census data here:))		1921 census (Note: 1921 figure taken from census data by combining the total population of all administrative divisions that compose the region of contemporary Pakistan, including Punjab, (Note: 1921 figure taken from census data by combining the total population of all districts (Lahore, Sialkot, Gujranwala, Sheikhupura, Gujrat, Shahpur, Jhelum, Rawalpindi, Attock, Mianwali, Montgomery, Lyallpur, Jhang, Multan, Muzaffargargh, Dera Ghazi Khan), one tehsil (Shakargarh – then part of Gurdaspur District), one princely state (Bahawalpur), and one tract (Biloch Trans–Frontier) in Punjab Province, British India that ultimately fell on the western side of the Radcliffe Line. See 1921 census data here: Immediately following the partition of India in 1947, these districts and tract would ultimately make up the subdivision of West Punjab, which also later included Bahawalpur. The state that makes up this region in the contemporary era is Punjab, Pakistan.) Sindh, (Note: 1921 figure taken from census data by combining the total population of all districts (Hyderabad, Karachi, Larkana, Nawabshah, Sukkur, Tharparkar, Upper Sind Frontier), and one princely state (Khairpur), in Sindh Province, British India. See 1921 census data here:) Khyber Pakhtunkhwa, Balochistan, Azad Jammu and Kashmir, (Note: 1921 figure taken from census data by combining the total population of two districts (Mirpur and Muzaffarabad) and one Jagir (Poonch) in the Princely State of Jammu and Kashmir that ultimately would be administered by Pakistan, in the contemporary self-administrative territory of Azad Jammu and Kashmir. See 1921 census data here:) and Gilgit–Baltistan. (Note: 1921 figure taken from census data by combining the total population of Gilgit District and the Frontier Ilaqas in the Princely State of Jammu and Kashmir that ultimately would be administered by Pakistan, in the contemporary administrative territory of Gilgit–Baltistan. See 1921 census data here:))		1931 census (Note: 1931 figure taken from census data by combining the total population of all administrative divisions that compose the region of contemporary Pakistan, including Punjab, (Note: 1931 figure taken from census data by combining the total population of all districts (Lahore, Sialkot, Gujranwala, Sheikhupura, Gujrat, Shahpur, Jhelum, Rawalpindi, Attock, Mianwali, Montgomery, Lyallpur, Jhang, Multan, Muzaffargargh, Dera Ghazi Khan), one tehsil (Shakargarh – then part of Gurdaspur District), one princely state (Bahawalpur), and one tract (Biloch Trans–Frontier) in Punjab Province, British India that ultimately fell on the western side of the Radcliffe Line. See 1931 census data here: Immediately following the partition of India in 1947, these districts and tract would ultimately make up the subdivision of West Punjab, which also later included Bahawalpur. The state that makes up this region in the contemporary era is Punjab, Pakistan.) Sindh, (Note: 1931 figure taken from census data by combining the total population of all districts (Hyderabad, Karachi, Larkana, Nawabshah, Sukkur, Tharparkar, Upper Sind Frontier), and one princely state (Khairpur), in Sindh Province, British India. See 1931 census data here:) Khyber Pakhtunkhwa, Balochistan, Azad Jammu and Kashmir, (Note: 1941 figure taken from census data by combining the total population of two districts (Mirpur and Muzaffarabad) and one Jagir (Poonch) in the Princely State of Jammu and Kashmir that ultimately would be administered by Pakistan, in the contemporary self-administrative territory of Azad Jammu and Kashmir. See 1941 census data here:) and Gilgit–Baltistan. (Note: 1931 figure taken from census data by combining the total population of Gilgit District and the Frontier Ilaqas in the Princely State of Jammu and Kashmir that ultimately would be administered by Pakistan, in the contemporary administrative territory of Gilgit–Baltistan. See 1931 census data here:))		1941 census (Note: 1941 figure taken from census data by combining the total population of all administrative divisions that compose the region of contemporary Pakistan, including Punjab, (Note: 1941 figure taken from census data by combining the total population of all districts (Lahore, Sialkot, Gujranwala, Sheikhupura, Gujrat, Shahpur, Jhelum, Rawalpindi, Attock, Mianwali, Montgomery, Lyallpur, Jhang, Multan, Muzaffargargh, Dera Ghazi Khan), one tehsil (Shakargarh – then part of Gurdaspur District), one princely state (Bahawalpur), and one tract (Biloch Trans–Frontier) in Punjab Province, British India that ultimately fell on the western side of the Radcliffe Line. See 1941 census data here: Immediately following the partition of India in 1947, these districts and tract would ultimately make up the subdivision of West Punjab, which also later included Bahawalpur. The state that makes up this region in the contemporary era is Punjab, Pakistan.) Sindh, (Note: 1941 figure taken from census data by combining the total population of all districts (Dadu, Hyderabad, Karachi, Larkana, Nawabshah, Sukkur, Tharparkar, Upper Sind Frontier), and one princely state (Khairpur), in Sindh Province, British India. See 1941 census data here:) Khyber Pakhtunkhwa, Balochistan, Azad Jammu and Kashmir, and Gilgit–Baltistan. (Note: 1941 figure taken from census data by combining the total population of one district (Astore) and one agency (Gilgit) in the Princely State of Jammu and Kashmir that ultimately would be administered by Pakistan, in the contemporary administrative territory of Gilgit–Baltistan. See 1941 census data here:))		1951 census		1961 census		1972 census		1981 census		1998 census		2017 census		2023 census		2026 census	
Religious group	Pop.	%	Pop.	%	Pop.	%	Pop.	%	Pop.	%	Pop.	%	Pop.	%	Pop.	%	Pop.	%	Pop.	%	Pop.	%	Pop.	%	Pop.	%
Islam	14,022,544	79.52%	14,966,846	79.58%	15,203,501	78.41%	17,557,877	77.98%	21,113,214	77.43%	32,731,582	97.12%	41,666,153	97.17%	60,434,659	96.75%	81,450,057	96.67%	127,433,409	96.28%	200,362,718	96.47%	231,686,709	96.35%		
Hinduism (Note: Including Ad-Dharmis)	3,009,842	17.07%	2,766,581	14.71%	2,957,680	15.25%	3,298,570	14.65%	3,981,565	14.6%	531,131	1.58%	621,805	1.45%	900,206	1.44%	1,276,116	1.51%	2,443,614	1.85%	4,444,870	2.14%	5,217,216	2.17%		
Sikhism	529,910	3.01%	884,987	4.71%	931,489	4.8%	1,282,698	5.7%	1,672,753	6.13%	—N/a	—N/a	—N/a	—N/a	—N/a	—N/a	2,146	0%	—N/a	—N/a	—N/a	—N/a	15,998	0.01%		
Christianity	59,387	0.34%	167,178	0.89%	276,107	1.42%	360,371	1.6%	432,724	1.59%	432,978	1.28%	583,884	1.36%	907,861	1.45%	1,310,426	1.56%	2,092,902	1.58%	2,642,048	1.27%	3,300,788	1.37%		
Jainism	6,529	0.04%	7,348	0.04%	7,490	0.04%	8,096	0.04%	13,215	0.05%	—N/a	—N/a	—N/a	—N/a	—N/a	—N/a	—N/a	—N/a	—N/a	—N/a	—N/a	—N/a	—N/a	—N/a		
Zoroastrianism	2,512	0.01%	3,007	0.02%	3,407	0.02%	4,178	0.02%	4,253	0.02%	5,320	0.02%	5,219	0.01%	9,589	0.02%	7,007	0.01%	—N/a	—N/a	—N/a	—N/a	2,348	0%		
Judaism	489	0%	702	0%	706	0%	1,019	0%	1,180	0%	—N/a	—N/a	—N/a	—N/a	—N/a	—N/a	—N/a	—N/a	—N/a	—N/a	—N/a	—N/a	—N/a	—N/a		
Buddhism	6	0%	207	0%	373	0%	155	0%	266	0%	680	0%	2,445	0.01%	4,318	0.01%	2,639	0%	—N/a	—N/a	—N/a	—N/a	—N/a	—N/a		
Tribal	—N/a	—N/a	9,224	0.05%	8,186	0.04%	236	0%	37,603	0.14%	—N/a	—N/a	—N/a	—N/a	—N/a	—N/a	—N/a	—N/a	—N/a	—N/a	—N/a	—N/a	—N/a	—N/a		
Ahmadiyya	—N/a	—N/a	—N/a	—N/a	—N/a	—N/a	—N/a	—N/a	—N/a	—N/a	—N/a	—N/a	—N/a	—N/a	—N/a	—N/a	104,244	0.12%	286,212	0.22%	191,737	0.09%	162,684	0.07%		
Others	2,039	0.01%	299	0%	77	0%	1,553	0.01%	19,228	0.07%	1,476	0%	872	0%	205,250	0.33%	101,009	0.12%	96,142	0.07%	43,253	0.02%	72,346	0.03%		
Total responses	17,633,258	99.58%	18,806,379	92.06%	19,389,016	87.28%	22,514,768	90.88%	27,266,001	91.98%	33,703,167	99.77%	42,880,378	99.77%	62,461,883	95.64%	84,253,644	100%	132,352,279	100%	207,684,626	100%	240,458,089	99.57%		
Total population	17,708,014	100%	20,428,473	100%	22,214,152	100%	24,774,056	100%	29,643,600	100%	33,779,555	100%	42,978,261	100%	65,309,340	100%	84,253,644	100%	132,352,279	100%	207,684,626	100%	241,499,431	100%		
Note 1: Colonial–era (1901, 1911, 1921, 1931, and 1941) figures taken from census data by combining the total population of all administrative divisions that compose the region of contemporary Pakistan, including Punjab, Sindh, Khyber Pakhtunkhwa, Balochistan, Azad Jammu and Kashmir, and Gilgit–Baltistan. Note 2: 1951 and 1961 figures taken from census data by combining the total population of the former administrative division of West Pakistan.

=== 1901 census ===
The total population of the region that composes contemporary Pakistan was approximately 17,708,014 according to the 1901 census. With the exception of the Federally Administered Tribal Areas, all administrative divisions in the region that composes contemporary Pakistan collected religious data, with a combined total population of 17,633,258, for an overall response rate of 99.6 percent. Similar to the contemporary era, where censuses do not collect religious data in Azad Jammu and Kashmir and Gilgit–Baltistan, the total number of responses for religion is slightly smaller than the total population, as detailed in the table breakdown below.

Religious groups in Pakistan (1901)
Religious group	Pakistan		Punjab		Sindh		Khyber Pakhtunkhwa		Balochistan		AJK		Gilgit– Baltistan	
Religious group	Total Population	Percentage	Pop.	%	Pop.	%	Pop.	%	Pop.	%	Pop.	%	Pop.	%
Islam	14,022,544	79.52%	7,951,155	76.25%	2,609,337	76.52%	1,890,479	92.19%	765,368	94.4%	747,426	85.62%	58,779	96.54%
Hinduism	3,009,842	17.07%	1,944,363	18.65%	787,683	23.1%	129,306	6.31%	38,158	4.71%	108,331	12.41%	2,001	3.29%
Sikhism	529,910	3.01%	483,999	4.64%	—N/a	—N/a	25,733	1.25%	2,972	0.37%	17,132	1.96%	74	0.12%
Christianity	59,387	0.34%	42,371	0.41%	7,825	0.23%	5,119	0.25%	4,026	0.5%	18	0%	28	0.05%
Jainism	6,529	0.04%	5,562	0.05%	921	0.03%	37	0%	8	0%	0	0%	1	0%
Zoroastrianism	2,512	0.01%	300	0%	2,000	0.06%	46	0%	166	0.02%	0	0%	0	0%
Judaism	489	0.003%	9	0%	428	0.01%	4	0%	48	0.01%	—N/a	—N/a	—N/a	—N/a
Buddhism	6	0%	6	0%	0	0%	0	0%	0	0%	0	0%	0	0%
Others	2,039	0.01%	0	0%	2,029	0.06%	0	0%	0	0%	8	0%	2	0%
Total responses	17,633,258	99.58%	10,427,765	100%	3,410,223	100%	2,050,724 (Note: Religious data only collected in North West Frontier Province, and not in the Federally Administered Tribal Areas. Total responses to religion includes North West Frontier Province, and total population includes both North West Frontier Province and the Federally Administered Tribal Areas, both administrative divisions which later amalgamated to become Khyber Pakhtunkhwa.)	96.48%	810,746	100%	872,915	100%	60,885	100%
Total population	17,708,014	100%	10,427,765	100%	3,410,223	100%	2,125,480	100%	810,746	100%	872,915	100%	60,885	100%

=== 1911 census ===
The total population of the region that composes contemporary Pakistan was approximately 20,428,473 according to the 1911 census. With the exception of the Federally Administered Tribal Areas, all administrative divisions in the region that composes contemporary Pakistan collected religious data, with a combined total population of 18,806,379, for an overall response rate of 92.1 percent. Similar to the contemporary era, where censuses do not collect religious data in Azad Jammu and Kashmir and Gilgit–Baltistan, the total number of responses for religion is slightly smaller than the total population, as detailed in the table breakdown below.

Religious groups in Pakistan (1911)
Religious group	Pakistan		Punjab		Sindh		Khyber Pakhtunkhwa		Balochistan		AJK		Gilgit– Baltistan	
Religious group	Total Population	Percentage	Pop.	%	Pop.	%	Pop.	%	Pop.	%	Pop.	%	Pop.	%
Islam	14,966,846	79.58%	8,494,314	76.49%	2,822,756	75.53%	2,039,994	92.86%	782,648	93.76%	749,945	87.76%	77,189	98.45%
Hinduism	2,766,581	14.71%	1,645,758	14.82%	877,313	23.47%	119,942	5.46%	38,326	4.59%	84,130	9.85%	1,112	1.42%
Sikhism	884,987	4.71%	813,441	7.33%	12,339	0.33%	30,345	1.38%	8,390	1.01%	20,391	2.39%	81	0.1%
Christianity	167,178	0.89%	144,514	1.3%	10,917	0.29%	6,585	0.3%	5,085	0.61%	55	0.01%	22	0.03%
Tribal	9,224	0.05%	—N/a	—N/a	9,224	0.25%	—N/a	—N/a	—N/a	—N/a	—N/a	—N/a	—N/a	—N/a
Jainism	7,348	0.04%	5,977	0.05%	1,349	0.04%	4	0%	10	0%	8	0%	0	0%
Zoroastrianism	3,007	0.02%	377	0%	2,411	0.06%	49	0%	170	0.02%	0	0%	0	0%
Judaism	702	0.004%	36	0%	595	0.02%	14	0%	57	0.01%	—N/a	—N/a	—N/a	—N/a
Buddhism	207	0.001%	168	0%	21	0%	0	0%	16	0%	2	0%	0	0%
Others	299	0.002%	0	0%	298	0.01%	0	0%	1	0%	0	0%	0	0%
Total responses	18,806,379	92.06%	11,104,585	100%	3,737,223	100%	2,196,933	57.53%	834,703	100%	854,531	100%	78,404	100%
Total population	20,428,473	100%	11,104,585	100%	3,737,223	100%	3,819,027	100%	834,703	100%	854,531	100%	78,404	100%

=== 1921 census ===
The total population of the region that composes contemporary Pakistan was approximately 22,214,152 according to the 1921 census. With the exception of the Federally Administered Tribal Areas, all administrative divisions in the region that composes contemporary Pakistan collected religious data, with a combined total population of 19,389,016, for an overall response rate of 87.3 percent. Similar to the contemporary era, where censuses do not collect religious data in Azad Jammu and Kashmir and Gilgit–Baltistan, the total number of responses for religion is slightly smaller than the total population, as detailed in the table breakdown below.

Religious groups in Pakistan (1921)
Religious group	Pakistan		Punjab		Sindh		Khyber Pakhtunkhwa		Balochistan		AJK		Gilgit– Baltistan	
Religious group	Total Population	Percentage	Pop.	%	Pop.	%	Pop.	%	Pop.	%	Pop.	%	Pop.	%
Islam	15,203,501	78.41%	8,975,288	75.49%	2,562,700	73.8%	2,062,786	91.62%	733,477	91.73%	780,607	88.02%	88,643	98.82%
Hinduism	2,957,680	15.25%	1,797,141	15.12%	876,629	25.24%	149,881	6.66%	51,348	6.42%	81,733	9.22%	948	1.06%
Sikhism	931,489	4.8%	863,091	7.26%	8,036	0.23%	28,040	1.25%	7,741	0.97%	24,491	2.76%	90	0.1%
Christianity	276,107	1.42%	247,030	2.08%	11,734	0.34%	10,610	0.47%	6,693	0.84%	24	0%	16	0.02%
Tribal	8,186	0.04%	—N/a	—N/a	8,186	0.24%	—N/a	—N/a	—N/a	—N/a	—N/a	—N/a	—N/a	—N/a
Jainism	7,490	0.04%	5,930	0.05%	1,534	0.04%	3	0%	17	0%	6	0%	0	0%
Zoroastrianism	3,407	0.02%	309	0%	2,913	0.08%	20	0%	165	0.02%	0	0%	0	0%
Judaism	706	0.004%	16	0%	671	0.02%	0	0%	19	0%	—N/a	—N/a	—N/a	—N/a
Buddhism	373	0.002%	172	0%	41	0%	0	0%	160	0.02%	0	0%	0	0%
Others	77	0.0004%	8	0%	64	0%	0	0%	5	0%	0	0%	0	0%
Total responses	19,389,016	87.28%	11,888,985	100%	3,472,508	100%	2,251,340	44.35%	799,625	100%	886,861	100%	89,697	100%
Total population	22,214,152	100%	11,888,985	100%	3,472,508	100%	5,076,476	100%	799,625	100%	886,861	100%	89,697	100%

=== 1931 census ===
The total population of the region that composes contemporary Pakistan was approximately 24,774,056 according to the 1931 census. With the exception of the Federally Administered Tribal Areas, all administrative divisions in the region that composes contemporary Pakistan collected religious data, with a combined total population of 22,514,768, for an overall response rate of 90.9 percent. Similar to the contemporary era, where censuses do not collect religious data in Azad Jammu and Kashmir and Gilgit–Baltistan, the total number of responses for religion is slightly smaller than the total population, as detailed in the table breakdown below.

Religious groups in Pakistan (1931)
Religious group	Pakistan		Punjab		Sindh		Khyber Pakhtunkhwa		Balochistan		AJK (Note: 1931 figure taken from census data by combining the total population of two districts (Mirpur and Muzaffarabad) and one Jagir (Poonch) in the Princely State of Jammu and Kashmir that ultimately would be administered by Pakistan, in the contemporary self-administrative territory of Azad Jammu and Kashmir. See 1931 census data here:)		Gilgit– Baltistan	
Religious group	Total Population	Percentage	Pop.	%	Pop.	%	Pop.	%	Pop.	%	Pop.	%	Pop.	%
Islam	17,557,877	77.98%	10,570,029	75.28%	3,017,377	73.34%	2,227,303	91.84%	798,093	91.88%	850,135	87.68%	94,940	98.44%
Hinduism	3,298,570	14.65%	1,957,878	13.94%	1,055,119	25.65%	142,977	5.9%	53,681	6.18%	87,554	9.03%	1,361	1.41%
Sikhism	1,282,698	5.7%	1,180,789	8.41%	19,172	0.47%	42,510	1.75%	8,425	0.97%	31,709	3.27%	93	0.1%
Christianity	360,371	1.6%	324,730	2.31%	15,152	0.37%	12,213	0.5%	8,059	0.93%	168	0.02%	49	0.05%
Jainism	8,096	0.04%	6,921	0.05%	1,144	0.03%	0	0%	17	0%	11	0%	3	0%
Zoroastrianism	4,178	0.02%	413	0%	3,537	0.09%	60	0%	167	0.02%	1	0%	0	0%
Judaism	1,019	0.005%	6	0%	985	0.02%	11	0%	17	0%	—N/a	—N/a	—N/a	—N/a
Tribal	236	0.001%	—N/a	—N/a	204	0%	—N/a	—N/a	32	0%	0	0%	0	0%
Buddhism	155	0.001%	32	0%	53	0%	2	0%	68	0.01%	0	0%	0	0%
Others	1,553	0.01%	0	0%	1,510	0.04%	0	0%	43	0%	0	0%	0	0%
Total responses	22,514,768	90.88%	14,040,798	100%	4,114,253	100%	2,425,076	51.77%	868,617	100%	969,578	100%	96,446	100%
Total population	24,774,056	100%	14,040,798	100%	4,114,253	100%	4,684,364	100%	868,617	100%	969,578	100%	96,446	100%

=== 1941 census ===
The total population of the region that composes contemporary Pakistan was approximately 29,643,600 according to the final census prior to partition in 1941. With the exception of the Federally Administered Tribal Areas, all administrative divisions in the region that composes contemporary Pakistan collected religious data, with a combined total population of 27,266,001, for an overall response rate of 92.0 percent. Similar to the contemporary era, where censuses do not collect religious data in Azad Jammu and Kashmir and Gilgit–Baltistan, the total number of responses for religion is slightly smaller than the total population, as detailed in the table breakdown below.

Religious groups in Pakistan (1941)
Religious group	Pakistan		Punjab		Sindh		Khyber Pakhtunkhwa		Balochistan		AJK		Gilgit– Baltistan	
Religious group	Total Population	Percentage	Pop.	%	Pop.	%	Pop.	%	Pop.	%	Pop.	%	Pop.	%
Islam	21,113,214	77.43%	13,022,160	75.06%	3,462,015	71.52%	2,788,797	91.8%	785,181	91.53%	939,460	87.54%	115,601	99.62%
Hinduism	3,981,565	14.6%	2,373,466	13.68%	1,279,530	26.43%	180,321	5.94%	54,394	6.34%	93,559	8.72%	295	0.25%
Sikhism	1,672,753	6.13%	1,530,112	8.82%	32,627	0.67%	57,939	1.91%	12,044	1.4%	39,910	3.72%	121	0.1%
Christianity	432,724	1.59%	395,311	2.28%	20,304	0.42%	10,889	0.36%	6,056	0.71%	136	0.01%	28	0.02%
Tribal	37,603	0.14%	—N/a	—N/a	37,598	0.78%	—N/a	—N/a	3	0%	0	0%	2	0%
Jainism	13,215	0.05%	9,520	0.05%	3,687	0.08%	1	0%	7	0%	0	0%	0	0%
Zoroastrianism	4,253	0.02%	312	0%	3,841	0.08%	24	0%	76	0.01%	0	0%	0	0%
Judaism	1,180	0.004%	7	0%	1,082	0.02%	71	0%	20	0%	0	0%	0	0%
Buddhism	266	0.001%	87	0%	111	0%	25	0%	43	0.01%	0	0%	0	0%
Others	19,228	0.07%	19,128	0.11%	0	0%	0	0%	11	0%	89	0.01%	0	0%
Total responses	27,266,001	91.98%	17,340,103	100%	4,840,795	100%	3,038,067	56.1%	857,835	100%	1,073,154	100%	116,047	100%
Total population	29,643,600	100%	17,340,103	100%	4,840,795	100%	5,415,666	100%	857,835	100%	1,073,154	100%	116,047	100%

=== 1951 census ===
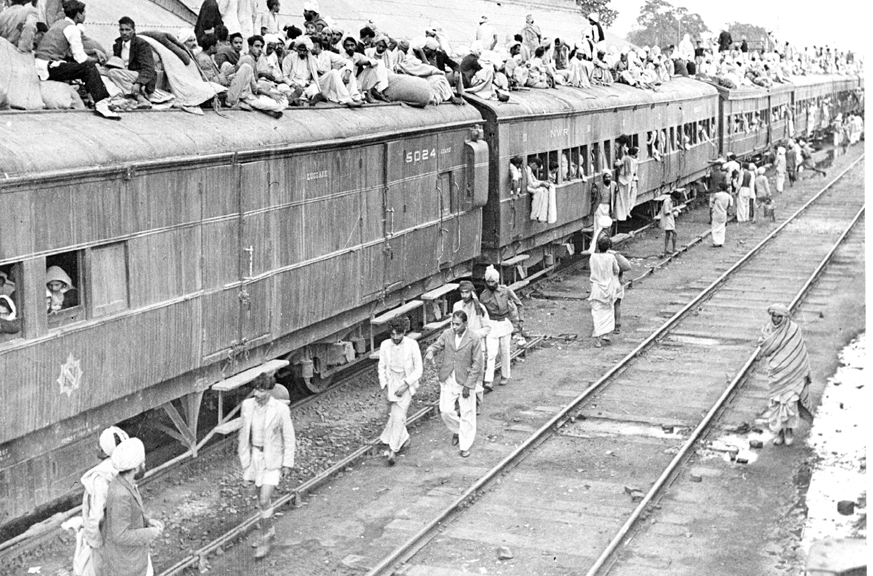
Refugees during Partition of India, 1947

Religion in Pakistan (1951 Official census)
1. Islam (97.1%)
2. Hinduism (1.60%)
3. Christianity (1.20%)
4. Others (0.10%)

After partition, when first census of Pakistan was conducted in the year 1951, It was found that the Muslim proportion in West Pakistan (contemporary Pakistan) increased from approximately 77.3 percent according to the 1941 census, to 97.1 percent as per the 1951 census; in contrast, the combined Hindu and Sikh proportion in West Pakistan (contemporary Pakistan) decreased from approximately 20.7 percent to just 1.7 percent during the same timeframe, as the 1947 Partition of India gave rise to bloody rioting and indiscriminate inter-communal killing of Hindus, Muslims, and Sikhs across the Indian subcontinent, especially in Punjab region. As a result, around 7.3 million Hindus and Sikhs moved to India and 7.2 million Muslims moved to Pakistan permanently, leading to demographic change of both the nations to a certain extent.

Religious groups in Pakistan (1951)
Religious group	Pakistan		Punjab		Sindh (Note: Including Federal Capital Territory (Karachi))		Khyber Pakhtunkhwa		Balochistan		AJK		Gilgit– Baltistan	
Religious group	Total Population	Percentage	Pop.	%	Pop.	%	Pop.	%	Pop.	%	Pop.	%	Pop.	%
Islam	32,731,582	97.12%	20,200,794	97.89%	5,535,645	91.53%	5,858,080	99.89%	1,137,063	98.52%	—N/a	—N/a	—N/a	—N/a
Hinduism	531,131	1.58%	33,052	0.16%	482,560	7.98%	2,432	0.04%	13,087	1.13%	—N/a	—N/a	—N/a	—N/a
Christianity	432,978	1.28%	402,617	1.95%	22,601	0.37%	3,823	0.07%	3,937	0.34%	—N/a	—N/a	—N/a	—N/a
Zoroastrianism	5,320	0.02%	195	0%	5,046	0.08%	—N/a	—N/a	79	0.01%	—N/a	—N/a	—N/a	—N/a
Buddhism	680	0.002%	9	0%	670	0.01%	—N/a	—N/a	1	0%	—N/a	—N/a	—N/a	—N/a
Others	1,476	0.004%	35	0%	1,226	0.02%	215	0%	0	0%	—N/a	—N/a	—N/a	—N/a
Total responses	33,703,167 (Note: Excluding 76,388 persons claiming Nationalities other than Pakistani.)	99.77%	20,636,702 (Note: Excluding 14,438 persons claiming Nationalities other than Pakistani.)	99.93%	6,047,748 (Note: Sindh: Excluding 2,715 persons claiming Nationalities other than Pakistani. Karachi Federal Capital Territory: Excluding 4,011 persons claiming Nationalities other than Pakistani.)	99.89%	5,864,550 (Note: Excluding 35,355 persons claiming Nationalities other than Pakistani.)	99.4%	1,154,167 (Note: Excluding 19,869 persons claiming Nationalities other than Pakistani.)	98.31%	—N/a	—N/a	—N/a	—N/a
Total population	33,779,555	100%	20,651,140	100%	6,054,474	100%	5,899,905	100%	1,174,036	100%	—N/a	—N/a	—N/a	—N/a

=== 1961 census ===
Religious groups in Pakistan (1961)
Religious group	Pakistan		Punjab		Sindh		Khyber Pakhtunkhwa		Balochistan		AJK		Gilgit– Baltistan	
Religious group	Total Population	Percentage	Pop.	%	Pop.	%	Pop.	%	Pop.	%	Pop.	%	Pop.	%
Islam	41,666,153	97.17%	25,013,796	97.78%	7,936,979	92.73%	7,569,026	99.88%	1,146,352	98.74%	—N/a	—N/a	—N/a	—N/a
Hinduism	621,805	1.45%	41,965	0.16%	568,530	6.64%	1,474	0.02%	9,836	0.85%	—N/a	—N/a	—N/a	—N/a
Christianity	583,884	1.36%	524,770	2.05%	46,931	0.55%	7,463	0.1%	4,720	0.41%	—N/a	—N/a	—N/a	—N/a
Zoroastrianism	5,219	0.01%	251	0%	4,866	0.06%	10	0%	92	0.01%	—N/a	—N/a	—N/a	—N/a
Buddhism	2,445	0.01%	757	0%	1,683	0.02%	4	0%	1	0%	—N/a	—N/a	—N/a	—N/a
Others	872	0.002%	104	0%	549	0.01%	209	0%	10	0%	—N/a	—N/a	—N/a	—N/a
Total responses	42,880,378 (Note: Excluding 97,883 persons claiming Nationalities other than Pakistani.)	99.77%	25,581,643 (Note: Excluding 37,794 persons claiming Nationalities other than Pakistani.)	99.85%	8,559,538 (Note: Sindh: Excluding 6,974 persons claiming Nationalities other than Pakistani.)	99.92%	7,578,186 (Note: Excluding 21,441 persons claiming Nationalities other than Pakistani.)	99.72%	1,161,011 (Note: Excluding 31,674 persons claiming Nationalities other than Pakistani.)	97.34%	—N/a	—N/a	—N/a	—N/a
Total population	42,978,261	100%	25,619,437	100%	8,566,512	100%	7,599,627	100%	1,192,685	100%	—N/a	—N/a	—N/a	—N/a

=== 1972 census ===
Religious groups in Pakistan (1972)
Religious group	Pakistan		Punjab		Sindh		Khyber Pakhtunkhwa		Balochistan		ICT		AJK		Gilgit– Baltistan	
Religious group	Total Population	Percentage	Pop.	%	Pop.	%	Pop.	%	Pop.	%	Pop.	%	Pop.	%	Pop.	%
Islam	60,434,659	96.75%	36,610,508	97.34%	13,212,500	93.34%	7,998,232	99.58%	2,381,810	98.07%	231,609	98.64%	—N/a	—N/a	—N/a	—N/a
Christianity	907,861	1.45%	786,494	2.09%	95,777	0.68%	12,828	0.16%	9,807	0.4%	2,955	1.26%	—N/a	—N/a	—N/a	—N/a
Hinduism	900,206	1.44%	61,405	0.16%	815,452	5.76%	5,014	0.06%	18,223	0.75%	112	0.05%	—N/a	—N/a	—N/a	—N/a
Zoroastrianism	9,589	0.02%	375	0%	8,923	0.06%	39	0%	173	0.01%	79	0.03%	—N/a	—N/a	—N/a	—N/a
Buddhism	4,318	0.01%	1,386	0%	2,736	0.02%	77	0%	61	0%	58	0.02%	—N/a	—N/a	—N/a	—N/a
Others	205,250	0.33%	149,991	0.4%	20,521	0.14%	16,134	0.2%	18,604	0.77%	0	0%	—N/a	—N/a	—N/a	—N/a
Total responses	62,461,883	95.64%	37,610,159	100%	14,155,909	100%	8,032,324	73.83%	2,428,678	100%	234,813	100%	—N/a	—N/a	—N/a	—N/a
Total population	65,309,340	100%	37,610,159	100%	14,155,909	100%	10,879,781	100%	2,428,678	100%	234,813	100%	—N/a	—N/a	—N/a	—N/a

=== 1981 census ===
Religious groups in Pakistan (1981)
Religious group	Pakistan		Punjab		Sindh		Khyber Pakhtunkhwa		Balochistan		ICT		AJK		Gilgit– Baltistan	
Religious group	Total Population	Percentage	Pop.	%	Pop.	%	Pop.	%	Pop.	%	Pop.	%	Pop.	%	Pop.	%
Islam	81,450,057	96.67%	46,110,205	97.5%	17,556,712	92.26%	13,194,345	99.51%	4,257,628	98.27%	331,167	97.32%	—N/a	—N/a	—N/a	—N/a
Christianity	1,310,426	1.56%	1,061,037	2.24%	176,898	0.93%	44,514	0.34%	20,131	0.46%	7,846	2.31%	—N/a	—N/a	—N/a	—N/a
Hinduism	1,276,116	1.51%	29,268	0.06%	1,221,961	6.42%	5,253	0.04%	19,598	0.45%	36	0.01%	—N/a	—N/a	—N/a	—N/a
Ahmadiyya	104,244	0.12%	63,694	0.13%	21,210	0.11%	12,333	0.09%	5,824	0.13%	1,183	0.35%	—N/a	—N/a	—N/a	—N/a
Zoroastrianism	7,007	0.01%	1,766	0%	4,305	0.02%	462	0%	439	0.01%	35	0.01%	—N/a	—N/a	—N/a	—N/a
Buddhism	2,639	0.003%	756	0%	1,714	0.01%	58	0%	106	0%	5	0%	—N/a	—N/a	—N/a	—N/a
Sikhism	2,146	0.003%	832	0%	393	0%	729	0.01%	189	0%	3	0%	—N/a	—N/a	—N/a	—N/a
Others	101,009	0.12%	24,883	0.05%	45,473	0.24%	2,181	0.02%	28,461	0.66%	11	0%	—N/a	—N/a	—N/a	—N/a
Total responses	84,253,644	100%	47,292,441	100%	19,028,666	100%	13,259,875	100%	4,332,376	100%	340,286	100%	—N/a	—N/a	—N/a	—N/a
Total population	84,253,644	100%	47,292,441	100%	19,028,666	100%	13,259,875	100%	4,332,376	100%	340,286	100%	—N/a	—N/a	—N/a	—N/a

=== 1998 census ===
Religious groups in Pakistan (1998)
Religious group	Pakistan		Punjab		Sindh		Khyber Pakhtunkhwa		Balochistan		ICT		AJK		Gilgit– Baltistan	
Religious group	Total Population	Percentage	Pop.	%	Pop.	%	Pop.	%	Pop.	%	Pop.	%	Pop.	%	Pop.	%
Islam	127,433,409	96.28%	71,574,830	97.22%	27,796,814	91.32%	20,808,480	99.47%	6,484,006	98.75%	769,279	95.53%	—N/a	—N/a	—N/a	—N/a
Hinduism	2,443,614	1.85%	116,410	0.16%	2,280,842	7.49%	7,011	0.03%	39,146	0.6%	205	0.03%	—N/a	—N/a	—N/a	—N/a
Christianity	2,092,902	1.58%	1,699,843	2.31%	294,885	0.97%	38,974	0.19%	26,462	0.4%	32,738	4.07%	—N/a	—N/a	—N/a	—N/a
Ahmadiyya	286,212	0.22%	181,428	0.25%	43,524	0.14%	48,703	0.23%	9,800	0.15%	2,757	0.34%	—N/a	—N/a	—N/a	—N/a
Others	96,142	0.07%	48,779	0.07%	23,828	0.08%	16,808	0.08%	6,471	0.1%	256	0.03%	—N/a	—N/a	—N/a	—N/a
Total responses	132,352,279	100%	73,621,290	100%	30,439,893	100%	20,919,976	100%	6,565,885	100%	805,235	100%	—N/a	—N/a	—N/a	—N/a
Total population	132,352,279	100%	73,621,290	100%	30,439,893	100%	20,919,976	100%	6,565,885	100%	805,235	100%	—N/a	—N/a	—N/a	—N/a

=== 2017 census ===
As per 2017 Census of Pakistan, the country has a population of 207,684,000.The CCI approved the release of provisional population figures of 207.754 million people. The final results showed the total population of Pakistan to be 207.684 million, a reduction of 68,738 people or 0.033% against provisional results.

As of 2018, there are 3.63 million non-Muslim voters in Pakistan- 1.77 million were Hindus, 1.64 million Christians, 167,505 were Ahmadi, 31,543 were Baháʼís, 8,852 were Sikhs, 4,020 were Parsis, 1,884 were Buddhist and others such as Kalashas. The NADRA makes it nearly impossible to declare and change the religion to anything from Islam making the statistics somewhat misleading.

Religious groups in Pakistan (2017)
Religious group	Pakistan		Punjab		Sindh		Khyber Pakhtunkhwa		Balochistan		ICT		AJK		Gilgit– Baltistan	
Religious group	Total Population	Percentage	Pop.	%	Pop.	%	Pop.	%	Pop.	%	Pop.	%	Pop.	%	Pop.	%
Islam	200,362,718	96.47%	107,541,602	97.77%	43,234,107	90.34%	35,428,857	99.79%	12,246,275	99.28%	1,911,877	95.43%	—N/a	—N/a	—N/a	—N/a
Hinduism	4,444,870	2.14%	211,641	0.19%	4,176,986	8.73%	6,373	0.02%	49,133	0.4%	737	0.04%	—N/a	—N/a	—N/a	—N/a
Christianity	2,642,048	1.27%	2,063,063	1.88%	408,301	0.85%	50,018	0.14%	33,819	0.27%	86,847	4.34%	—N/a	—N/a	—N/a	—N/a
Ahmadiyya	191,737	0.09%	158,021	0.14%	21,661	0.05%	7,204	0.02%	2,113	0.02%	2,738	0.14%	—N/a	—N/a	—N/a	—N/a
Others	43,253	0.02%	15,328	0.01%	13,455	0.03%	9,512	0.03%	3,789	0.03%	1,169	0.06%	—N/a	—N/a	—N/a	—N/a
Total responses	207,684,626	100%	109,989,655	100%	47,854,510	100%	35,501,964	100%	12,335,129	100%	2,003,368	100%	—N/a	—N/a	—N/a	—N/a
Total population	207,684,626	100%	109,989,655	100%	47,854,510	100%	35,501,964	100%	12,335,129	100%	2,003,368	100%	—N/a	—N/a	—N/a	—N/a

==== Details ====
Pakistan Bureau of Statistics released religious data of Pakistan Census 2017 on 19 May 2021. 96.47% are Muslims, followed by 2.14% Hindus, 1.27% Christians, 0.09% Ahmadis and 0.02% others.

These are some maps of religious minority groups. The 2017 census showed an increasing share in Hinduism, mainly caused by a higher birth rate among the impoverished Hindus of Sindh province. This census also recorded Pakistan's first Hindu-majority district, called Umerkot District, where Muslims were previously the majority.

On the other hand, Christianity in Pakistan, while increasing in raw numbers, has fallen significantly in percentage terms since the last census. This is due to Pakistani Christians having a significantly lower fertility rate than Pakistani Muslims and Pakistani Hindus as well as them being concentrated in the most developed parts of Pakistan, Lahore District (over 5% Christian), Islamabad Capital Territory (over 4% Christian), and Northern Punjab.

The Ahmadiyya movement shrunk in size (both raw numbers and percentage) between 1998 and 2017, while remaining concentrated in Lalian Tehsil, Chiniot District, where approximately 13% of the population is Ahmadi.

Here are some maps of Pakistan's religious minority groups as of the 2017 census by district:

Hindu proportion of each Pakistani District of each Pakistani District as of the 2017 Pakistan Census

Christian proportion of each Pakistani District of each Pakistani District as of the 2017 Pakistan Census

Ahmadiyya proportion of each Pakistani District of each Pakistani District as of the 2017 Pakistan Census

=== 2023 census ===
Religious groups in Pakistan (2023)
Religious group	Pakistan		Punjab		Sindh		Khyber Pakhtunkhwa		Balochistan		ICT		AJK		Gilgit– Baltistan	
Religious group	Total Population	Percentage	Pop.	%	Pop.	%	Pop.	%	Pop.	%	Pop.	%	Pop.	%	Pop.	%
Islam	231,686,709	96.35%	124,462,897	97.75%	50,126,428	90.09%	40,486,153	99.62%	14,429,568	99.09%	2,181,663	95.55%	—N/a	—N/a	—N/a	—N/a
Hinduism	5,217,216	2.17%	249,716	0.2%	4,901,407	8.81%	6,102	0.02%	59,107	0.41%	884	0.04%	—N/a	—N/a	—N/a	—N/a
Christianity	3,300,788	1.37%	2,458,924	1.93%	546,968	0.98%	134,884	0.33%	62,731	0.43%	97,281	4.26%	—N/a	—N/a	—N/a	—N/a
Ahmadiyya	162,684	0.07%	140,512	0.11%	18,266	0.03%	951	0%	557	0%	2,398	0.11%	—N/a	—N/a	—N/a	—N/a
Sikhism	15,998	0.01%	5,649	0%	5,182	0.01%	4,050	0.01%	1,057	0.01%	60	0%	—N/a	—N/a	—N/a	—N/a
Zoroastrianism	2,348	0.001%	358	0%	1,763	0%	36	0%	181	0%	10	0%	—N/a	—N/a	—N/a	—N/a
Others	72,346	0.03%	15,249	0.01%	38,395	0.07%	8,944	0.02%	8,810	0.06%	948	0.04%	—N/a	—N/a	—N/a	—N/a
Total responses	240,458,089	99.57%	127,333,305	99.72%	55,638,409	99.9%	40,641,120	99.47%	14,562,011	97.77%	2,283,244	96.59%	—N/a	—N/a	—N/a	—N/a
Total population	241,499,431	100%	127,688,922	100%	55,696,147	100%	40,856,097	100%	14,894,402	100%	2,363,863	100%	—N/a	—N/a	—N/a	—N/a

== Demographics of religion by province/territory ==
=== Punjab ===
Religion in Punjab, Pakistan (1855–2023)
Religious group	1855 (Note: 1855 figure taken from census data by combining the total population of Lahore, Sialkot, Gujranwala, Gujrat, Shahpur, Jhelum, Rawalpindi, Gogera (Montgomery), Jhang, Multan, Layyah (Muzaffargargh), Khangarh (Mianwali) Dera Ghazi Khan that ultimately fell on the western side of the Radcliffe Line. Total population excludes Bahawalpur State and Shakargarh Tehsil as princely states were not enumerated during the 1855 census, while granular sub-district data was also not available during the 1855 census. See 1855 census data here:)		1868 (Note: 1868 figure taken from census data by combining the total population of Lahore, Sialkot, Gujranwala, Gujrat, Shahpur, Jhelum, Rawalpindi, Montgomery, Jhang, Multan, Muzaffargargh, Dera Ghazi Khan that ultimately fell on the western side of the Radcliffe Line. Total population excludes Bahawalpur State and Shakargarh Tehsil as princely states were not enumerated during the 1868 census, while granular sub-district data was also not available during the 1868 census. See 1868 census data here:)		1881 (Note: 1881 figure taken from census data by combining the total population of all districts (Lahore, Sialkot, Gujranwala, Gujrat, Shahpur, Jhelum, Rawalpindi, Montgomery, Jhang, Multan, Muzaffargargh, Dera Ghazi Khan), one tehsil (Shakargarh – then part of Gurdaspur District), and one princely state (Bahawalpur) in Punjab Province, British India that ultimately fell on the western side of the Radcliffe Line. See 1881 census data here: Immediately following the partition of India in 1947, these districts and tract would ultimately make up the subdivision of West Punjab, which also later included Bahawalpur. The state that makes up this region in the contemporary era is Punjab, Pakistan.)		1891 (Note: 1891 figure taken from census data by combining the total population of all districts (Lahore, Sialkot, Gujranwala, Gujrat, Shahpur, Jhelum, Rawalpindi, Montgomery, Jhang, Multan, Muzaffargargh, Dera Ghazi Khan), one tehsil (Shakargarh – then part of Gurdaspur District), one princely state (Bahawalpur), and one tract (Biloch Trans–Frontier) in Punjab Province, British India that ultimately fell on the western side of the Radcliffe Line. See 1891 census data here: Immediately following the partition of India in 1947, these districts and tract would ultimately make up the subdivision of West Punjab, which also later included Bahawalpur. The state that makes up this region in the contemporary era is Punjab, Pakistan.)		1901		1911		1921		1931		1941		1951		1961		1972		1981		1998		2017		2023	
Religious group	Pop.	%	Pop.	%	Pop.	%	Pop.	%	Pop.	%	Pop.	%	Pop.	%	Pop.	%	Pop.	%	Pop.	%	Pop.	%	Pop.	%	Pop.	%	Pop.	%	Pop.	%	Pop.	%
Islam	3,937,730 (Note: Includes all Abrahamic religions and others (Islam, Christianity, Zoroastrianism, Judaism, others).)	74.56%	4,750,944	75.1%	6,201,859	78.09%	6,766,545	76.07%	7,951,155	76.25%	8,494,314	76.49%	8,975,288	75.49%	10,570,029	75.28%	13,022,160	75.06%	20,200,794	97.89%	25,013,796	97.78%	36,610,508	97.34%	46,110,205	97.5%	71,574,830	97.22%	107,541,602	97.77%	124,462,897	97.75%
Hinduism (Note: 1931–1941 census: Including Ad-Dharmis)	1,343,361 (Note: Includes all Dharmic religions (Hinduism, Sikhism, Jainism, Buddhism, others).)	25.44%	1,264,052 (Note: Including total Chamar & Chuhra populations, enumerated separately during the 1868 census.)	19.98%	1,449,913	18.26%	1,727,810	19.42%	1,944,363	18.65%	1,645,758	14.82%	1,797,141	15.12%	1,957,878	13.94%	2,373,466	13.68%	33,052	0.16%	41,965	0.16%	61,405	0.16%	29,268	0.06%	116,410	0.16%	211,641	0.19%	249,716	0.2%
Sikhism	—N/a	—N/a	290,337	4.59%	272,908	3.44%	366,162	4.12%	483,999	4.64%	813,441	7.33%	863,091	7.26%	1,180,789	8.41%	1,530,112	8.82%	—N/a	—N/a	—N/a	—N/a	—N/a	—N/a	832	0.002%	—N/a	—N/a	—N/a	—N/a	5,649	0.004%
Christianity	—N/a	—N/a	8,626	0.14%	12,992	0.16%	30,168	0.34%	42,371	0.41%	144,514	1.3%	247,030	2.08%	324,730	2.31%	395,311	2.28%	402,617	1.95%	524,770	2.05%	786,494	2.09%	1,061,037	2.24%	1,699,843	2.31%	2,063,063	1.88%	2,458,924	1.93%
Jainism	—N/a	—N/a	5,027	0.08%	4,352	0.05%	4,408	0.05%	5,562	0.05%	5,977	0.05%	5,930	0.05%	6,921	0.05%	9,520	0.05%	—N/a	—N/a	—N/a	—N/a	—N/a	—N/a	—N/a	—N/a	—N/a	—N/a	—N/a	—N/a	—N/a	—N/a
Zoroastrianism	—N/a	—N/a	—N/a	—N/a	354	0.004%	215	0.002%	300	0.003%	377	0.003%	309	0.003%	413	0.003%	312	0.002%	195	0.001%	251	0.001%	375	0.001%	1,766	0.004%	—N/a	—N/a	—N/a	—N/a	358	0%
Buddhism	—N/a	—N/a	—N/a	—N/a	0	0%	0	0%	6	0%	168	0.002%	172	0.001%	32	0%	87	0.001%	9	0%	757	0.003%	1,386	0.004%	756	0.002%	—N/a	—N/a	—N/a	—N/a	—N/a	—N/a
Judaism	—N/a	—N/a	—N/a	—N/a	—N/a	—N/a	17	0%	9	0%	36	0%	16	0%	6	0%	7	0%	—N/a	—N/a	—N/a	—N/a	—N/a	—N/a	—N/a	—N/a	—N/a	—N/a	—N/a	—N/a	—N/a	—N/a
Ahmadiyya	—N/a	—N/a	—N/a	—N/a	—N/a	—N/a	—N/a	—N/a	—N/a	—N/a	—N/a	—N/a	—N/a	—N/a	—N/a	—N/a	—N/a	—N/a	—N/a	—N/a	—N/a	—N/a	—N/a	—N/a	63,694	0.13%	181,428	0.25%	158,021	0.14%	140,512	0.11%
Others	—N/a	—N/a	7,061	0.11%	21	0%	17	0%	0	0%	0	0%	8	0%	0	0%	19,534	0.11%	35	0%	104	0%	149,991	0.4%	24,883	0.05%	48,779	0.07%	15,328	0.01%	15,249	0.01%
Total responses	5,281,091	100%	6,326,047	100%	7,942,399	100%	8,895,342	100%	10,427,765	100%	11,104,585	100%	11,888,985	100%	14,040,798	100%	17,350,103	100%	20,636,702	99.93%	25,581,643	99.85%	37,610,159	100%	47,292,441	100%	73,621,290	100%	109,989,655	100%	127,333,305	99.72%
Total population	5,281,091	100%	6,326,047	100%	7,942,399	100%	8,895,342	100%	10,427,765	100%	11,104,585	100%	11,888,985	100%	14,040,798	100%	17,350,103	100%	20,651,140	100%	25,581,643	100%	37,610,159	100%	47,292,441	100%	73,621,290	100%	109,989,655	100%	127,688,922	100%

=== Sindh ===
Religion in Sindh (1872−2023)
Religious group	1872 (Note: 1872 figure taken from census data by combining the total population of all districts (Karachi, Hyderabad, Shikarpur, Tharparkar, Upper Sind Frontier), and one princely state (Khairpur), in Sindh Province, British India. Religious affiliation was not enumerated in Khairpur. See 1872 census data here:)		1881 (Note: 1881 figure taken from census data by combining the total population of all districts (Karachi, Hyderabad, Shikarpur, Tharparkar, Upper Sind Frontier), and one princely state (Khairpur), in Sindh Province, British India. See 1881 census data here:)		1891 (Note: 1891 figure taken from census data by combining the total population of all districts (Karachi, Hyderabad, Shikarpur, Tharparkar, Upper Sind Frontier), and one princely state (Khairpur), in Sindh Province, British India. See 1891 census data here:)		1901		1911		1921		1931		1941		1951		1961		1972		1981		1998		2017		2023	
Religious group	Pop.	%	Pop.	%	Pop.	%	Pop.	%	Pop.	%	Pop.	%	Pop.	%	Pop.	%	Pop.	%	Pop.	%	Pop.	%	Pop.	%	Pop.	%	Pop.	%	Pop.	%
Islam	1,712,266 (Note: Sunni Islam: 1,700,468 Shia Islam: 11,798)	78.1%	1,989,630	78.24%	2,318,180	77.18%	2,609,337	76.52%	2,822,756	75.53%	2,562,700	73.8%	3,017,377	73.34%	3,462,015	71.52%	5,535,645	91.53%	7,936,979	92.73%	13,212,500	93.34%	17,556,712	92.26%	27,796,814	91.32%	43,234,107	90.34%	50,126,428	90.09%
Hinduism (Note: 1872 census: Also includes Tribals, Jains, and Nanakpanthis (Sikhs). 1881 census: Also includes Tribals and Nanakpanthis (Sikhs). 1891 census: Also includes Tribals. 1901 census: Also includes Tribals and Nanakpanthis (Sikhs).)	475,848 (Note: Caste Hindu: 390,435 Scheduled Castes, Tribals, and Jains: 61,514 Nanakpanthis (Sikhs): 23,899)	21.7%	544,848	21.43%	674,371	22.45%	787,683	23.1%	877,313	23.47%	876,629	25.24%	1,055,119	25.65%	1,279,530	26.43%	482,560	7.98%	568,530	6.64%	815,452	5.76%	1,221,961	6.42%	2,280,842	7.49%	4,176,986	8.73%	4,901,407	8.81%
Christianity	3,329 (Note: Roman Catholic: 1,670 Church of England: 1,142 Native Christian (Oriental Orthodox & Syriac): 359 Presbyterian: 156 Greek Orthodox: 2)	0.15%	6,082	0.24%	7,768	0.26%	7,825	0.23%	10,917	0.29%	11,734	0.34%	15,152	0.37%	20,304	0.42%	22,601	0.37%	46,931	0.55%	95,777	0.68%	176,898	0.93%	294,885	0.97%	408,301	0.85%	546,968	0.98%
Zoroastrianism	870 (Note: Shensoy Sect: 712 Kadimi Sect: 158)	0.04%	1,063	0.04%	1,534	0.05%	2,000	0.06%	2,411	0.06%	2,913	0.08%	3,537	0.09%	3,841	0.08%	5,046	0.08%	4,866	0.06%	8,923	0.06%	4,305	0.02%	—N/a	—N/a	—N/a	—N/a	1,763	0.003%
Buddhism	67	0.003%	9	0%	2	0%	0	0%	21	0.001%	41	0.001%	53	0.001%	111	0.002%	670	0.01%	1,683	0.02%	2,736	0.02%	1,714	0.01%	—N/a	—N/a	—N/a	—N/a	—N/a	—N/a
Judaism	35	0.002%	153	0.01%	210	0.01%	428	0.01%	595	0.02%	671	0.02%	985	0.02%	1,082	0.02%	—N/a	—N/a	—N/a	—N/a	—N/a	—N/a	—N/a	—N/a	—N/a	—N/a	—N/a	—N/a	—N/a	—N/a
Jainism	—N/a	—N/a	1,191	0.05%	923	0.03%	921	0.03%	1,349	0.04%	1,534	0.04%	1,144	0.03%	3,687	0.08%	—N/a	—N/a	—N/a	—N/a	—N/a	—N/a	—N/a	—N/a	—N/a	—N/a	—N/a	—N/a	—N/a	—N/a
Sikhism	—N/a	—N/a	—N/a	—N/a	720	0.02%	—N/a (Note: 1901 census: Enumerated as Hindus.)	—N/a	12,339	0.33%	8,036	0.23%	19,172	0.47%	32,627	0.67%	—N/a	—N/a	—N/a	—N/a	—N/a	—N/a	393	0%	—N/a	—N/a	—N/a	—N/a	5,182	0.01%
Tribal	—N/a	—N/a	—N/a	—N/a	—N/a	—N/a	—N/a	—N/a	9,224	0.25%	8,186	0.24%	204	0%	37,598	0.78%	—N/a	—N/a	—N/a	—N/a	—N/a	—N/a	—N/a	—N/a	—N/a	—N/a	—N/a	—N/a	—N/a	—N/a
Ahmadiyya	—N/a	—N/a	—N/a	—N/a	—N/a	—N/a	—N/a	—N/a	—N/a	—N/a	—N/a	—N/a	—N/a	—N/a	—N/a	—N/a	—N/a	—N/a	—N/a	—N/a	—N/a	—N/a	21,210	0.11%	43,524	0.14%	21,661	0.05%	18,266	0.03%
Others	0	0%	0	0%	3	0%	2,029	0.06%	298	0.01%	64	0.002%	1,510	0.04%	0	0%	1,226	0.02%	549	0.01%	20,521	0.14%	45,473	0.24%	23,828	0.08%	13,455	0.03%	38,395	0.07%
Total Responses	2,192,415	94.39%	2,542,976	100%	3,003,711	100%	3,410,223	100%	3,737,223	100%	3,472,508	100%	4,114,253	100%	4,840,795	100%	6,047,748	99.89%	8,559,538	99.92%	14,155,909	100%	19,028,666	100%	30,439,893	100%	47,854,510	100%	55,638,409	99.9%
Total Population	2,322,765	100%	2,542,976	100%	3,003,711	100%	3,410,223	100%	3,737,223	100%	3,472,508	100%	4,114,253	100%	4,840,795	100%	6,054,474	100%	8,566,512	100%	14,155,909	100%	19,028,666	100%	30,439,893	100%	47,854,510	100%	55,696,147	100%

=== Khyber Pakhtunkhwa ===
Religion in Khyber Pakhtunkhwa (1855–2023)
Religious group	1855		1868		1881		1891		1901		1911		1921		1931		1941		1951		1961		1972		1981		1998		2017		2023	
Religious group	Pop.	%	Pop.	%	Pop.	%	Pop.	%	Pop.	%	Pop.	%	Pop.	%	Pop.	%	Pop.	%	Pop.	%	Pop.	%	Pop.	%	Pop.	%	Pop.	%	Pop.	%	Pop.	%
Islam	1,099,134	90.86%	1,563,061	90.97%	1,787,341	91.4%	2,088,015	91.51%	1,890,479	92.19%	2,039,994	92.86%	2,062,786	91.62%	2,227,303	91.84%	2,788,797	91.8%	5,858,080	99.89%	7,569,026	99.88%	7,998,232	99.58%	13,194,345	99.51%	20,808,480	99.47%	35,428,857	99.79%	40,486,153	99.62%
Hinduism (Note: 1951, 1961, 1972, 1981, 1998, 2017, 2023: Including Hindu (Jati) and Scheduled Castes.)	110,602	9.14%	141,441	8.23%	154,081	7.88%	166,984	7.32%	129,306	6.31%	119,942	5.46%	149,881	6.66%	142,977	5.9%	180,321	5.94%	2,432	0.04%	1,474	0.02%	5,014	0.06%	5,253	0.04%	7,011	0.03%	6,373	0.02%	6,102	0.02%
Sikhism	—N/a	—N/a	6,904	0.4%	9,205	0.47%	21,110	0.93%	25,733	1.25%	30,345	1.38%	28,040	1.25%	42,510	1.75%	57,939	1.91%	—N/a	—N/a	—N/a	—N/a	—N/a	—N/a	729	0.01%	—N/a	—N/a	—N/a	—N/a	4,050	0.01%
Christianity	—N/a	—N/a	3,801	0.22%	4,725	0.24%	5,437	0.24%	5,119	0.25%	6,585	0.3%	10,610	0.47%	12,213	0.5%	10,889	0.36%	3,823	0.07%	7,463	0.1%	12,828	0.16%	44,514	0.34%	38,974	0.19%	50,018	0.14%	134,884	0.33%
Jainism	—N/a	—N/a	52	0%	106	0.01%	108	0.005%	37	0.002%	4	0.0002%	3	0.0001%	0	0%	1	0%	—N/a	—N/a	—N/a	—N/a	—N/a	—N/a	—N/a	—N/a	—N/a	—N/a	—N/a	—N/a	—N/a	—N/a
Zoroastrianism	—N/a	—N/a	—N/a	—N/a	52	0.003%	48	0.002%	46	0.002%	49	0.002%	20	0.001%	60	0.002%	24	0.001%	—N/a	—N/a	10	0%	39	0%	462	0%	—N/a	—N/a	—N/a	—N/a	36	0.0001%
Buddhism	—N/a	—N/a	—N/a	—N/a	0	0%	0	0%	0	0%	0	0%	0	0%	2	0.0001%	25	0.001%	—N/a	—N/a	4	0%	77	0%	58	0%	—N/a	—N/a	—N/a	—N/a	—N/a	—N/a
Judaism	—N/a	—N/a	—N/a	—N/a	—N/a	—N/a	4	0.0002%	4	0.0002%	14	0.001%	0	0%	11	0.0005%	71	0.002%	—N/a	—N/a	—N/a	—N/a	—N/a	—N/a	—N/a	—N/a	—N/a	—N/a	—N/a	—N/a	—N/a	—N/a
Ahmadiyya	—N/a	—N/a	—N/a	—N/a	—N/a	—N/a	—N/a	—N/a	—N/a	—N/a	—N/a	—N/a	—N/a	—N/a	—N/a	—N/a	—N/a	—N/a	—N/a	—N/a	—N/a	—N/a	—N/a	—N/a	12,333	0.09%	48,703	0.23%	7,204	0.02%	951	0.002%
Others	—N/a	—N/a	2,941	0.17%	5	0.0003%	2	0.0001%	0	0%	0	0%	0	0%	0	0%	0	0%	215	0.004%	209	0%	16,134	0.2%	2,181	0.02%	16,808	0.08%	9,512	0.03%	8,944	0.02%
Total Responses (Note: Total responses during all colonial–era (1855, 1868, 1881, 1891, 1901, 1911, 1921, 1931, and 1941) census counts are an amalgamation of all the districts of North-West Frontier Province at the time, including Hazara, Mardan, Peshawar, Kohat, Bannu, and Dera Ismail Khan. Religious affiliation was not enumerated in the Federally Administered Tribal Areas and former princely states of Amb, Chitral, Dir, Phulra and Swat during all colonial–era census counts. Religious affiliation was not enumerated in the Federally Administered Tribal Areas during one modern–era census count (1972). Total responses in all other modern–era (1951, 1961, 1981, 1998, 2017, 2023) census counts are an amalgamation of the North-West Frontier Province and Federally Administered Tribal Areas. Both administrative divisions would ultimately merge to form Khyber Pakhtunkhwa in 2018.)	1,209,736	100%	1,718,200	100%	1,955,515	100%	2,281,708	100%	2,050,724	96.48%	2,196,933	57.53%	2,251,340	44.35%	2,425,076	51.77%	3,038,067	56.1%	5,864,550	99.4%	7,578,186	99.72%	8,032,324	73.83%	13,259,875	100%	20,919,976	100%	35,501,964	100%	40,641,120	99.47%
Total Population	1,209,736	100%	1,718,200	100%	1,955,515	100%	2,281,708	100%	2,125,480	100%	3,819,027	100%	5,076,476	100%	4,684,364	100%	5,415,666	100%	5,899,905	100%	7,599,627	100%	10,879,781	100%	13,259,875	100%	20,919,976	100%	35,501,964	100%	40,856,097	100%
Note 1: Total responses during all colonial–era (1855, 1868, 1881, 1891, 1901, 1911, 1921, 1931, and 1941) census counts are an amalgamation of all the districts of North–West Frontier Province at the time, including Hazara, Mardan, Peshawar, Kohat, Bannu, and Dera Ismail Khan. Religious affiliation was not enumerated in the Federally Administered Tribal Areas and former princely states of Amb, Chitral, Dir, Phulra and Swat during all colonial–era census counts. Note 2: Religious affiliation was not enumerated in the Federally Administered Tribal Areas during one modern–era census count (1972). Total responses in all other modern–era (1951, 1961, 1981, 1998, 2017, 2023) census counts are an amalgamation of the North-West Frontier Province and Federally Administered Tribal Areas. Both administrative divisions would ultimately merge to form Khyber Pakhtunkhwa in 2018.

=== Balochistan ===
Religion in Balochistan (1901–2023)
Religious group	1901		1911		1921		1931		1941		1951		1961		1972		1981		1998		2017		2023	
Religious group	Pop.	%	Pop.	%	Pop.	%	Pop.	%	Pop.	%	Pop.	%	Pop.	%	Pop.	%	Pop.	%	Pop.	%	Pop.	%	Pop.	%
Islam	765,368	94.4%	782,648	93.76%	733,477	91.73%	798,093	91.88%	785,181	91.53%	1,137,063	98.52%	1,146,352	98.74%	2,381,810	98.07%	4,257,628	98.27%	6,484,006	98.75%	12,255,528	99.28%	14,429,568	99.09%
Hinduism	38,158	4.71%	38,326	4.59%	51,348	6.42%	53,681	6.18%	54,394	6.34%	13,087	1.13%	9,836	0.85%	18,223	0.75%	19,598	0.45%	39,146	0.6%	49,378	0.4%	59,107	0.41%
Christianity	4,026	0.5%	5,085	0.61%	6,693	0.84%	8,059	0.93%	6,056	0.71%	3,937	0.34%	4,720	0.41%	9,807	0.4%	20,131	0.46%	26,462	0.4%	33,330	0.27%	62,731	0.43%
Sikhism	2,972	0.37%	8,390	1.01%	7,741	0.97%	8,425	0.97%	12,044	1.4%	—N/a	—N/a	—N/a	—N/a	—N/a	—N/a	189	0.004%	—N/a	—N/a	—N/a	—N/a	1,057	0.01%
Zoroastrianism	166	0.02%	170	0.02%	165	0.02%	167	0.02%	76	0.01%	79	0.01%	92	0.01%	173	0.01%	439	0.01%	—N/a	—N/a	—N/a	—N/a	181	0%
Judaism	48	0.01%	57	0.01%	19	0.002%	17	0.002%	20	0.002%	—N/a	—N/a	—N/a	—N/a	—N/a	—N/a	—N/a	—N/a	—N/a	—N/a	—N/a	—N/a	—N/a	—N/a
Jainism	8	0.001%	10	0.001%	17	0.002%	17	0.002%	7	0.001%	—N/a	—N/a	—N/a	—N/a	—N/a	—N/a	—N/a	—N/a	—N/a	—N/a	—N/a	—N/a	—N/a	—N/a
Buddhism	0	0%	16	0.002%	160	0.02%	68	0.01%	43	0.01%	1	0%	1	0%	61	0.003%	106	0.002%	—N/a	—N/a	—N/a	—N/a	—N/a	—N/a
Ahmadiyya	—N/a	—N/a	—N/a	—N/a	—N/a	—N/a	—N/a	—N/a	—N/a	—N/a	—N/a	—N/a	—N/a	—N/a	—N/a	—N/a	5,824	0.13%	9,800	0.15%	2,469	0.02%	557	0.004%
Others	0	0%	1	0%	5	0.001%	75	0.01%	14	0.002%	0	0%	10	0%	18,604	0.77%	28,461	0.66%	6,471	0.1%	3,703	0.03%	8,810	0.06%
Total responses	810,746	100%	834,703	100%	799,625	100%	868,617	100%	857,835	100%	1,154,167	98.31%	1,161,011	97.34%	2,428,678	100%	4,332,376	100%	6,565,885	100%	12,344,408	100%	14,562,011	97.77%
Total population	810,746	100%	834,703	100%	799,625	100%	868,617	100%	857,835	100%	1,174,036	100%	1,192,685	100%	2,428,678	100%	4,332,376	100%	6,565,885	100%	12,344,408	100%	14,894,402	100%

=== Azad Jammu and Kashmir ===
Religious groups in Azad Jammu and Kashmir (1891–1941)
Religious group	1891 (Note: 1891 figure taken from census data by combining the total population of two districts (Bhimber and Muzaffarabad) and one Jagir (Poonch) in the Princely State of Jammu and Kashmir that ultimately would be administered by Pakistan, in the contemporary self-administrative territory of Azad Jammu and Kashmir. See 1891 census data here:)		1901		1911		1921		1931		1941	
Religious group	Pop.	%	Pop.	%	Pop.	%	Pop.	%	Pop.	%	Pop.	%
Islam	659,265	86.87%	747,426	85.62%	749,945	87.76%	780,607	88.02%	850,135	87.68%	939,460	87.54%
Hinduism	92,639	12.21%	108,331	12.41%	84,130	9.85%	81,733	9.22%	87,554	9.03%	93,559	8.72%
Sikhism	6,918	0.91%	17,132	1.96%	20,391	2.39%	24,491	2.76%	31,709	3.27%	39,910	3.72%
Jainism	64	0.01%	0	0%	8	0%	6	0%	11	0%	0	0%
Christianity	21	0%	18	0%	55	0.01%	24	0%	168	0.02%	136	0.01%
Buddhism	0	0%	0	0%	2	0%	0	0%	0	0%	0	0%
Zoroastrianism	0	0%	0	0%	0	0%	0	0%	1	0%	0	0%
Tribal	0	0%	—N/a	—N/a	—N/a	—N/a	—N/a	—N/a	0	0%	0	0%
Judaism	—N/a	—N/a	—N/a	—N/a	—N/a	—N/a	—N/a	—N/a	—N/a	—N/a	0	0%
Others	0	0%	8	0%	0	0%	0	0%	0	0%	89	0.01%
Total population	758,907	100%	872,915	100%	854,531	100%	886,861	100%	969,578	100%	1,073,154	100%

=== Gilgit–Baltistan ===
Religious groups in Gilgit–Baltistan (1891–1941)
Religious group	1891 (Note: 1891 figure taken from census data by combining the total population of Skardu District and Gilgit District in the Princely State of Jammu and Kashmir that ultimately would be administered by Pakistan, in the contemporary administrative territory of Gilgit–Baltistan. See 1891 census data here:)		1901		1911		1921		1931		1941	
Religious group	Pop.	%	Pop.	%	Pop.	%	Pop.	%	Pop.	%	Pop.	%
Islam	110,161	86.68%	58,779	96.54%	77,189	98.45%	88,643	98.82%	94,940	98.44%	115,601	99.62%
Tribal	16,615	13.07%	—N/a	—N/a	—N/a	—N/a	—N/a	—N/a	0	0%	2	0%
Buddhism	239	0.19%	0	0%	0	0%	0	0%	0	0%	0	0%
Hinduism	77	0.06%	2,001	3.29%	1,112	1.42%	948	1.06%	1,361	1.41%	295	0.25%
Christianity	2	0%	28	0.05%	22	0.03%	16	0.02%	49	0.05%	28	0.02%
Sikhism	0	0%	74	0.12%	81	0.1%	90	0.1%	93	0.1%	121	0.1%
Jainism	0	0%	1	0%	0	0%	0	0%	3	0%	0	0%
Zoroastrianism	0	0%	0	0%	0	0%	0	0%	0	0%	0	0%
Judaism	—N/a	—N/a	—N/a	—N/a	—N/a	—N/a	—N/a	—N/a	—N/a	—N/a	0	0%
Others	0	0%	2	0%	0	0%	0	0%	0	0%	0	0%
Total population	127,094	100%	60,885	100%	78,404	100%	89,697	100%	96,446	100%	116,047	100%

== Islam ==
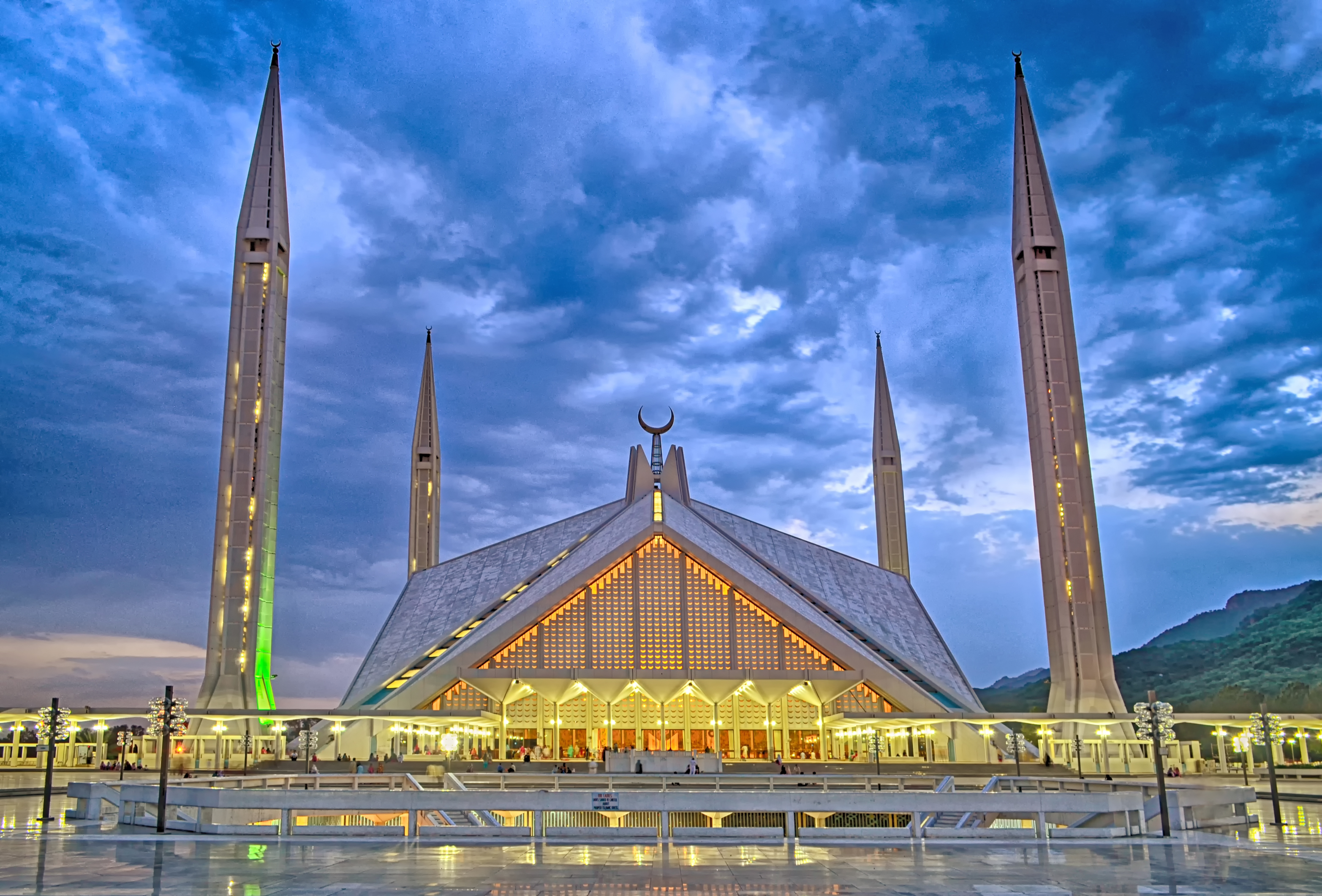
The Faisal Mosque in Islamabad, which is the largest mosque of Pakistan and is also one of the largest in the world, was built by King Faisal of Saudi Arabia.

Islam is the state religion of Pakistan, and about 96–98% of Pakistanis are Muslim. Pakistan has the second largest number of Muslims in the world after Indonesia. The majority are Sunni (estimated at 85–95%), with an estimated 5–15% Shia. A PEW survey in 2012 found that 6% of Pakistani Muslims were Shia.

Among Sunni Muslims, the Hanafi school of jurisprudence is followed by the majority while a minority belongs to the Ahl-i Hadith tradition which rejects imitation of the four schools. The majority of Pakistani Shia Muslims belong to the Twelver (Ithna Asharia) branch, with significant minority who adhere to Ismailism branch that is composed of Nizari (Aga Khanis), Mustaali, Dawoodi Bohra, Sulaymani, and others. Sufis and above mentioned Sunni and Shia sects are considered to be Muslims according to the Constitution of Pakistan; the Ahmadiyya (though self-described Muslims) are specifically declared not to be.

The mosque is an important religious as well as social institution in Pakistan. Many rituals and ceremonies are celebrated according to Islamic calendar.

=== Sunni ===
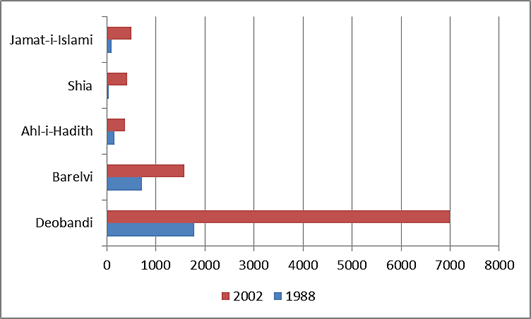
Growth in the number of religious madrassahs in Pakistan from 1988 to 2002.

According to the CIA World Factbook and Oxford Centre for Islamic Studies, 96–97% of the total population of Pakistan is Muslim.

Pakistani Sunnis generally follow the Hanafi school of jurisprudence. Most of the madrasas in Pakistan are affiliated with the Barelvi and Deobandi movements that originated in British India. Approximately 65% of Pakistan's Islamic seminaries are affiliated with the Deobandis, compared to 25% associated with the Barelvis. Other regular Hanafi schools include the Jamaat-e-Islami's madrasas, Minhaj-ul-Quran madrasas and others which are neither Barelvi nor Deobandi. A minority of madrasas are affiliated with the Ahl-i Hadith.

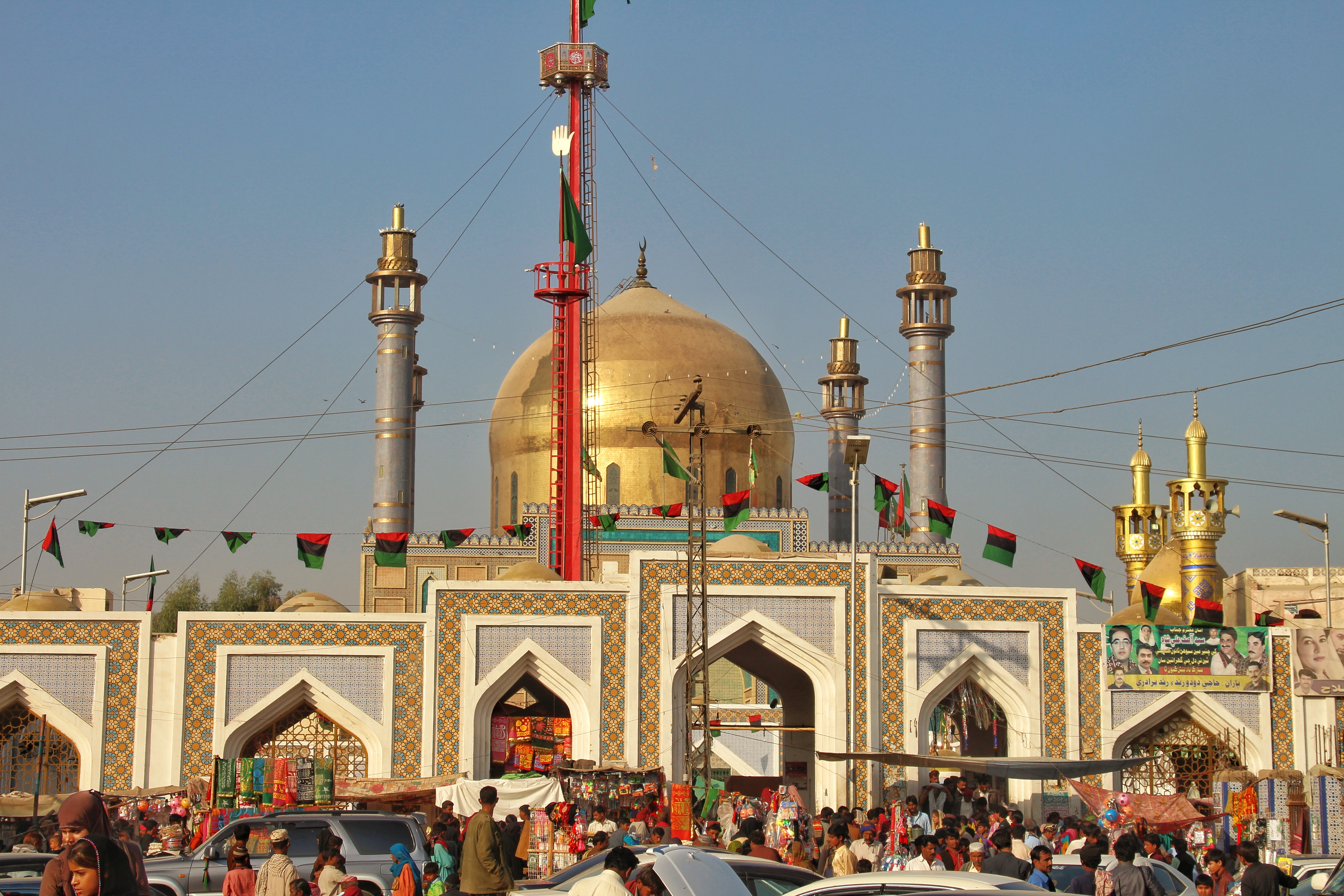
The shrine of Lal Shahbaz Qalandar

Islam to some extent syncretized with pre-Islamic influences, resulting in a religion with some traditions distinct from those of the Arab world. Two Sufis whose shrines receive much national attention are Ali Hajweri in Lahore (ca. 11th century) and Shahbaz Qalander in Sehwan, Sindh (ca. 12th century). Sufism, a mystical Islamic tradition, promoted by Fariduddin Ganjshakar in Pakpatan, has a long history and a large popular following in Pakistan. Popular Sufi culture is centered on Thursday night gatherings at shrines and annual festivals which feature Sufi music and dance. Contemporary Islamic fundamentalists criticize its popular character, which in their view, does not accurately reflect the teachings and practice of the Islamic prophet Muhammad and his companions. There have been terrorist attacks directed at Sufi shrines and festivals, 5 in 2010 that killed 64 people.

=== Ahmadiyya ===
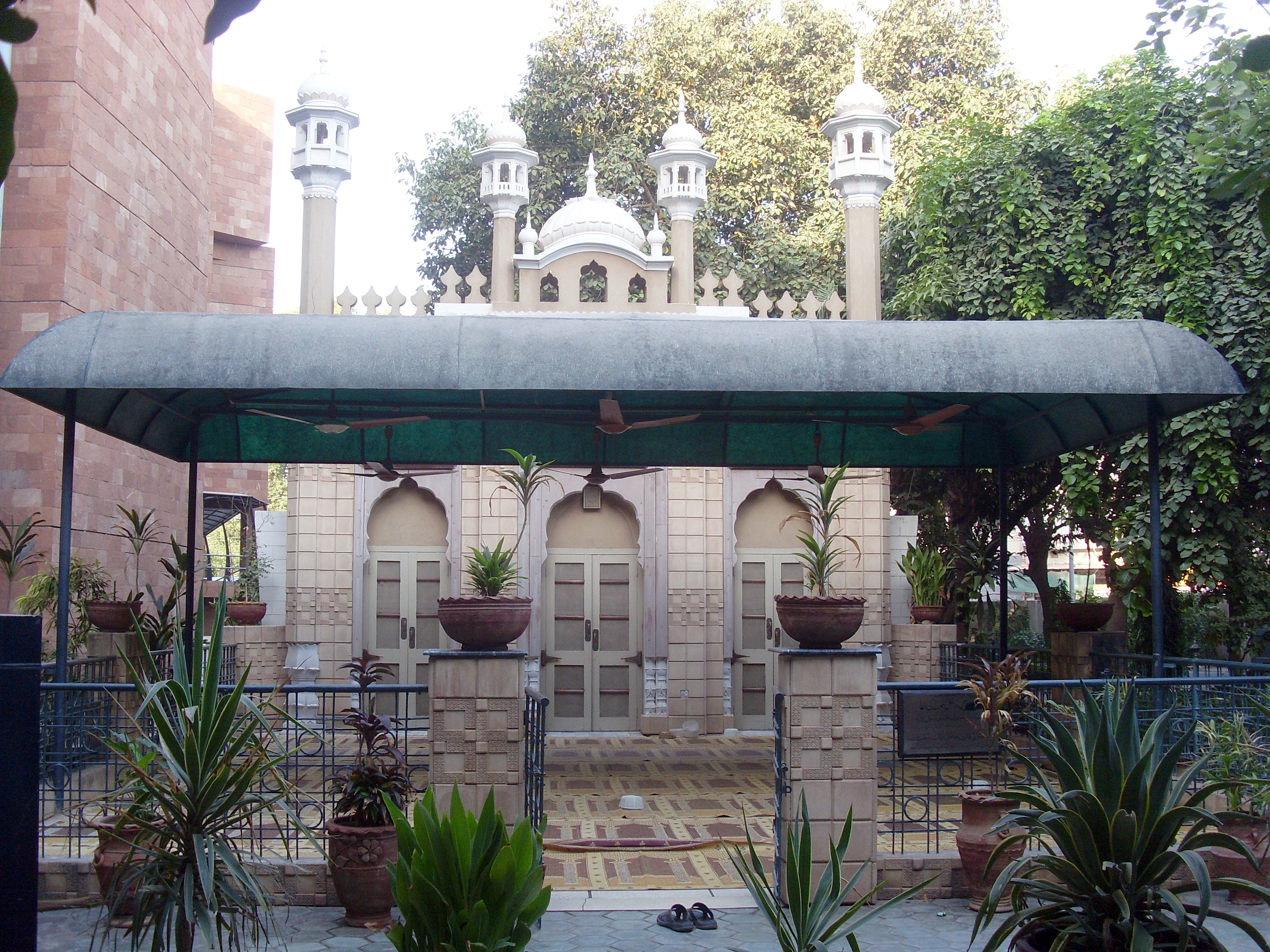
Yadgar Mosque, the first mosque of Rabwah

According to the last Census in Pakistan, Ahmadis made up 0.07% of the population; however, the Ahmadiyya boycotted the census. Independent groups generally estimate the population to be somewhere between two and five million. In media reports, four million is the most commonly cited figure.

In 1974, the government of Pakistan amended the Constitution of Pakistan to define a Muslim according to Qu'ran 33:40, as a person who believes in finality of Muhammad under the Ordinance XX. According to Ordinance XX, Ahmadis cannot call themselves Muslim or "pose as Muslims" which is punishable by three years in prison. They believe in Muhammad as the final law-bearing prophet, but also believe Mirza Ghulam Ahmad to be a prophet, the prophecised Mehdi and second coming of Jesus. Consequently, they were declared non-Muslims by a parliamentary tribunal and are subject to persecution under Pakistani blasphemy laws.

== Hinduism ==
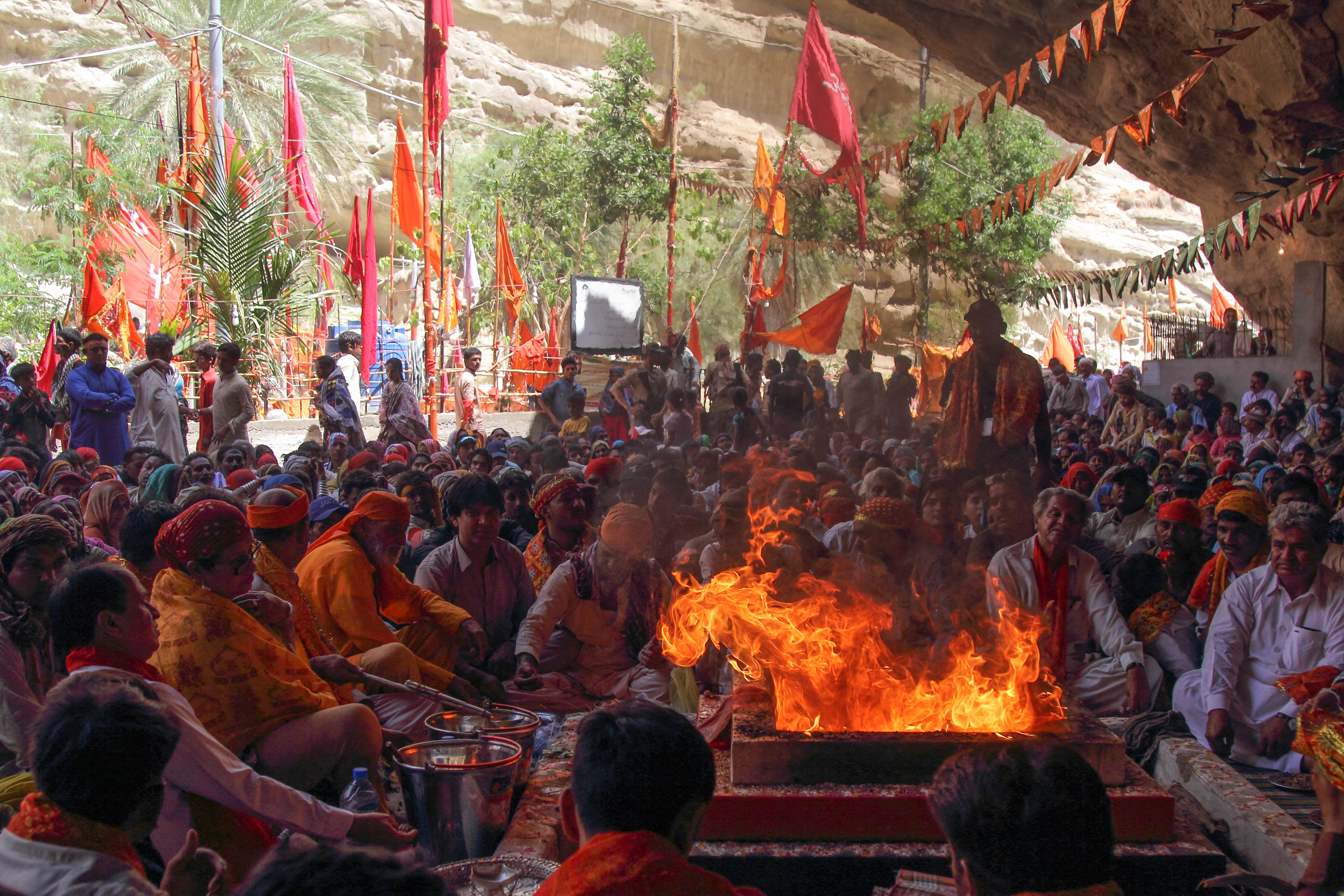
Shri Hinglaj Mata temple shakti peetha is the largest Hindu pilgrimage centre in Pakistan. The annual Hinglaj Yathra is attended by about 300,000 people.

Hinduism is the second largest religion affiliation in Pakistan after Islam. As of 2025, Pakistan has the fourth largest Hindu population in the world after India, Nepal and Bangladesh. According to the 2023 Census, the Hindu population was found to be 5,217,216 constituting 2.17%, slightly up from 2.14% in 2017 census. Hindus are geographically concentrated in the Sindh province. About 94% of Hindus live in Sindh and remaining 5% in Punjab and around 1% in Balochistan.

The Rig Veda, the oldest Hindu text, is believed to have been composed in the Punjab region in the Indian subcontinent around 1500 BCE and spread from there across South and South East Asia slowly developing and evolving into the various forms of the faith we see today. Many ancient Hindu temples are located throughout Pakistan. A significant Hindu pilgrimage site known as Hinglaj Mata takes place in southern Balochistan, where nearly 300,000 people visit during spring as a pilgrimage. Another major pilgrimage site is the Shri Ramdev Pir temple, whose annual Ramdevpir Mela in the temple is the second largest Hindu pilgrimage in Pakistan.

Cases collected by Global Human Rights Defence show that underage Hindu (and Christian) girls are often targeted by Muslims for forced conversion to Islam. According to the National Commission of Justice and Peace and the Pakistan Hindu Council (PHC) around 1,000 non-Muslim minority women are converted to Islam and then forcibly married off to their abductors or rapists.

== Christianity ==
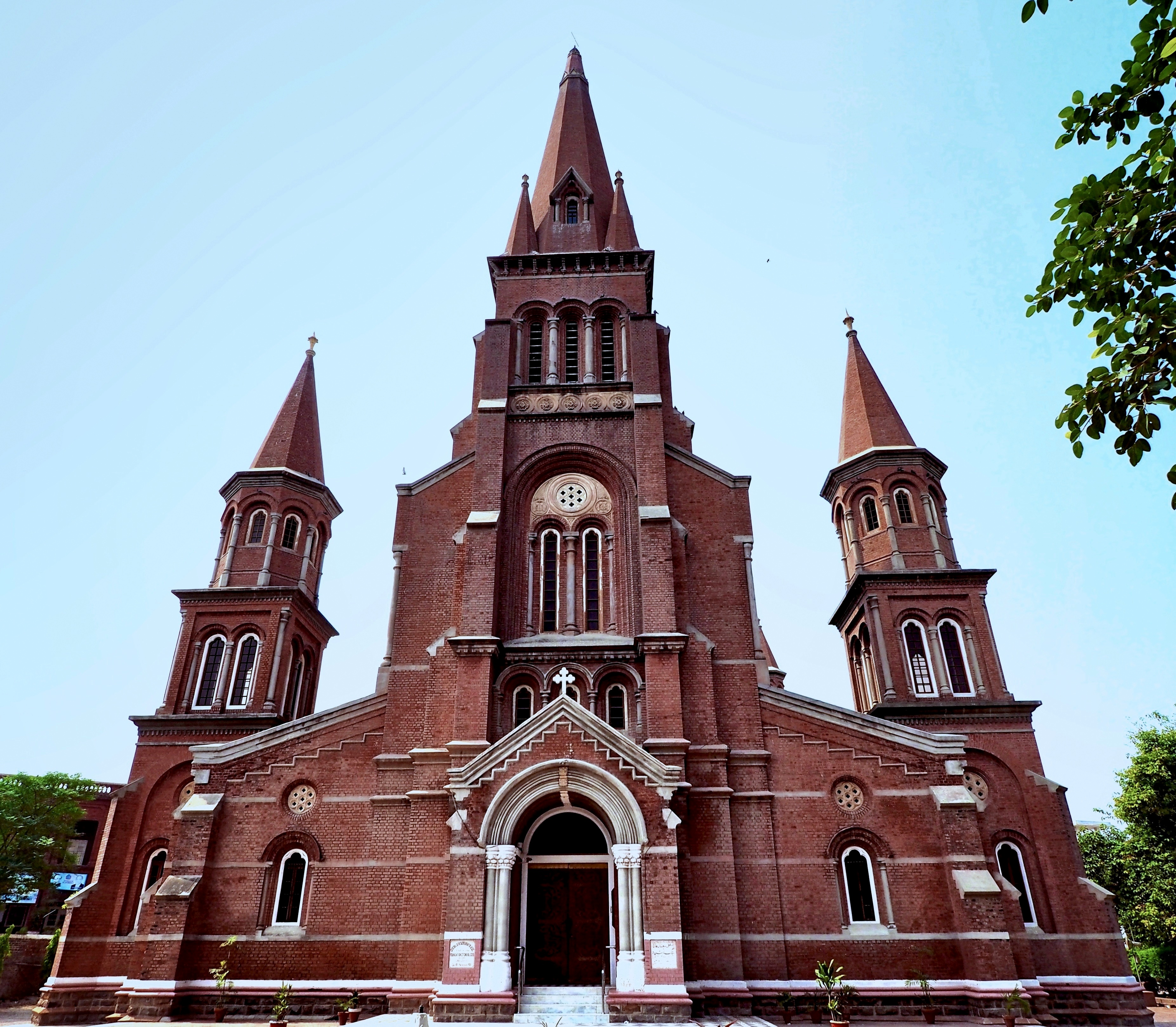
Sacred Heart Cathedral, Lahore

Christians (Urdu: مسيحى، عیسائی) make up 1.6% of Pakistan's population. The population is nearly split equally between Catholics and Protestants. The majority of the Pakistani Christian community consists of Punjabis speaking who converted during the British colonial era. There were waves of conversions to Christianity among the Chuhra and Chamar between the 1870s and 1930s in the Punjab Province and United Provinces of Agra and Oudh. Christians mainly live in the urban centres of Punjab. There is also a Roman Catholic community in Karachi which was established by Goan and Tamil migrants when Karachi's infrastructure was being developed between the two World Wars. A few Protestant groups conduct missions in Pakistan. The present Christian population in Pakistan is ranged between 2 and 3 million as per as recent (2020–21) year estimation by various institution and NGOs of Pakistan.

There are a number of church-run schools in Pakistan that admit students of all religions, including Forman Christian College, St. Patrick's Institute of Science & Technology and Saint Joseph's College for Women, Karachi.

== Sikhism ==
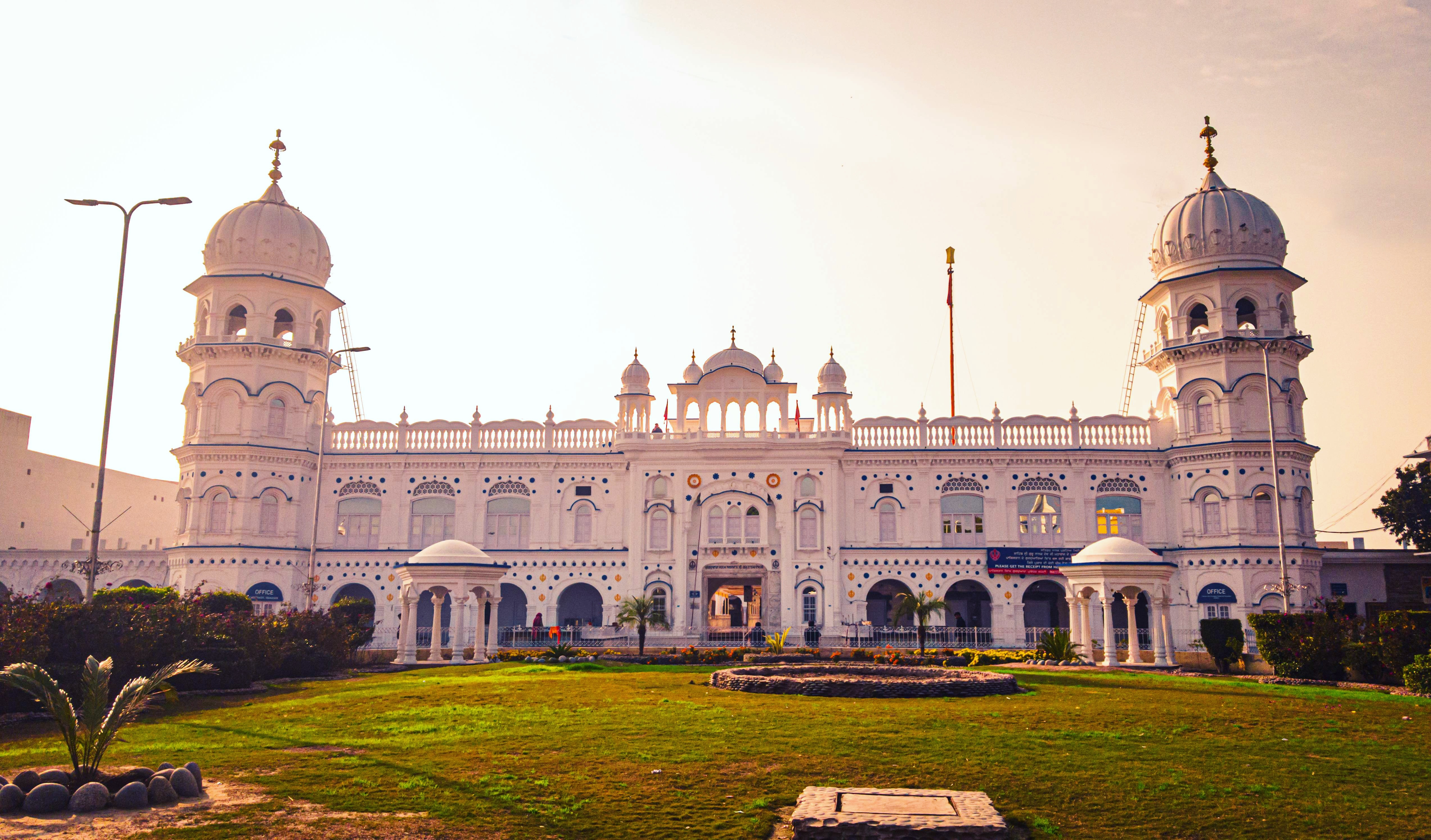
Gurdwara Janam Asthan, the birthplace of the founder of Sikhism in Nankana Sahib

In the 15th century, the Sikh faith was born in the Punjab region (of present day India and Pakistan) where Sikhism's founder Guru Nanak was born. Home to some of the world's most sacred gurdwaras, Sikhs have a become a crucial part in Pakistan's religious tourism with large numbers coming to the country particularly during festivals. Sikhism was included as a religious category in 2023, which showed the population to be 15,998. Other estimated put the number between 20,000 to 35,000. The National Database and Registration Authority (NADRA) which documents the voters there were 8,852 Sikh Voters in 2018.

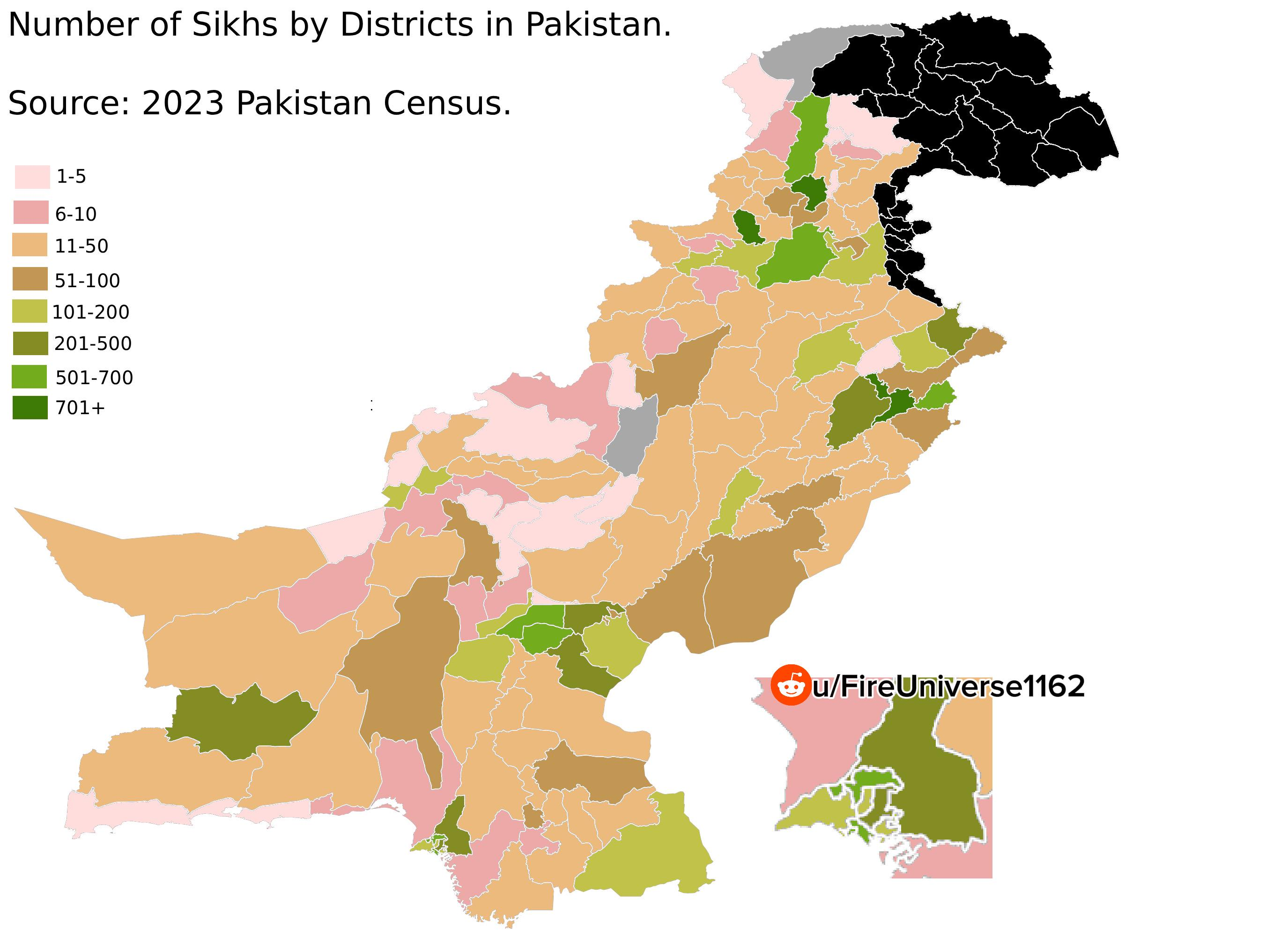
Number of Sikhs in Pakistan by district in 2023

== Other religions ==
=== Baháʼí ===
The Baháʼí Faith in Pakistan was present when it was still under British colonial rule. The roots of the religion in the region go back to the first days of the Bábí religion in 1844, with Shaykh Sa'id Hindi who was from Multan. During Bahá'u'lláh's lifetime, as founder of the religion, he encouraged some of his followers to move to the area that is present day Pakistan.

The Baháʼís in Pakistan have the right to hold public meetings, establish academic centers, teach their faith, and elect their administrative councils. Bahá'í sources claim their population to be around 30,000. Shoba Das of Minority Rights Group International reported around 200 Baháʼís in Islamabad and between 2,000 and 3,000 Baháʼís in Pakistan, in 2013. One more PhD thesis says that "It is an assumption that the Bahá’ís do not want to declare their exact population, which is supposed to be more or less 3,000 in total". Most of these Bahá’ís have their roots in Iran.

=== Zoroastrianism ===
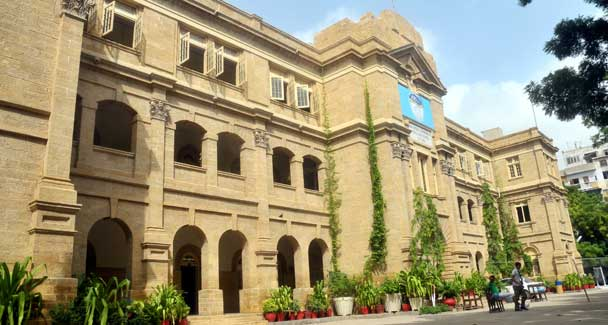
Bai Virbaiji Soparivala Parsi School, Karachi

There are at least 4,000 Pakistani citizens practicing the Zoroastrian religion. The region of Balochistan is believed to have been a stronghold of Zoroastrianism before the advent of Islam. With the flight of Zoroastrians from Greater Iran into the Indian subcontinent, the Parsi communities were established. More recently, from the 15th century onwards, Zorastrians came to settle the coast of Sindh and have established thriving communities and commercial enterprises. At the time of independence of Pakistan in 1947, Karachi and Lahore were home to a thriving Parsi business community. Karachi had the most prominent population of Parsis in Pakistan, though their population is declining. Parsis have entered Pakistani public life as social workers, business folk, journalists and diplomats. The most prominent Parsis of Pakistan today include Ardeshir Cowasjee, Byram Dinshawji Avari, Jamsheed Marker, as well as Minocher Bhandara. The founding father of Pakistan, Muhammad Ali Jinnah, married Ratti Bai who belonged to a Parsi family before her conversion to Islam.

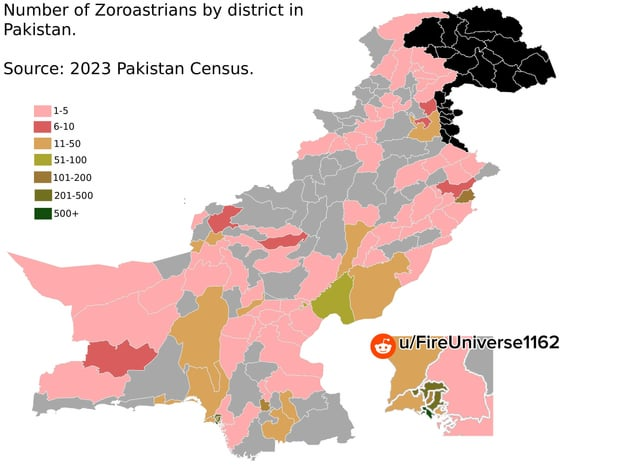
Number of Zoroastrians in Pakistan by district

=== Kalash ===
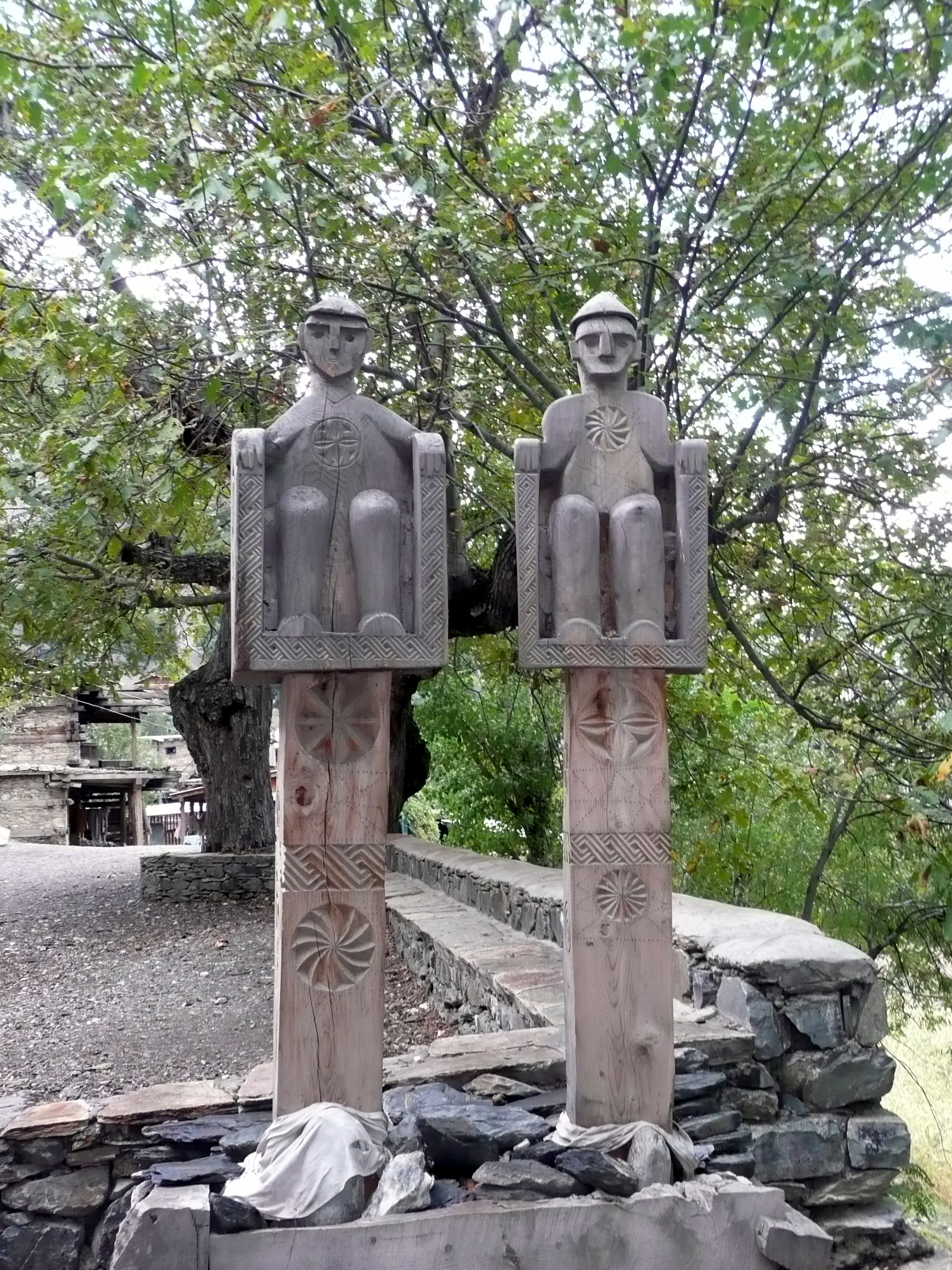
Guardians of a Kalasha village in the valley of Mumuret (Bumburet)

The Kalash people practise a form of ancient Hinduism mixed with animism. Adherents of the Kalash religion number around 3,000 and inhabit three remote valleys in Chitral; Bumboret, Rumbur and Birir. Their religion has been compared to that of ancient Greece, but they are much closer to the Hindu traditions in other parts of the Indian subcontinent. It is more similar to the historical Vedic religion, than later forms of Hinduism.

=== Jainism ===
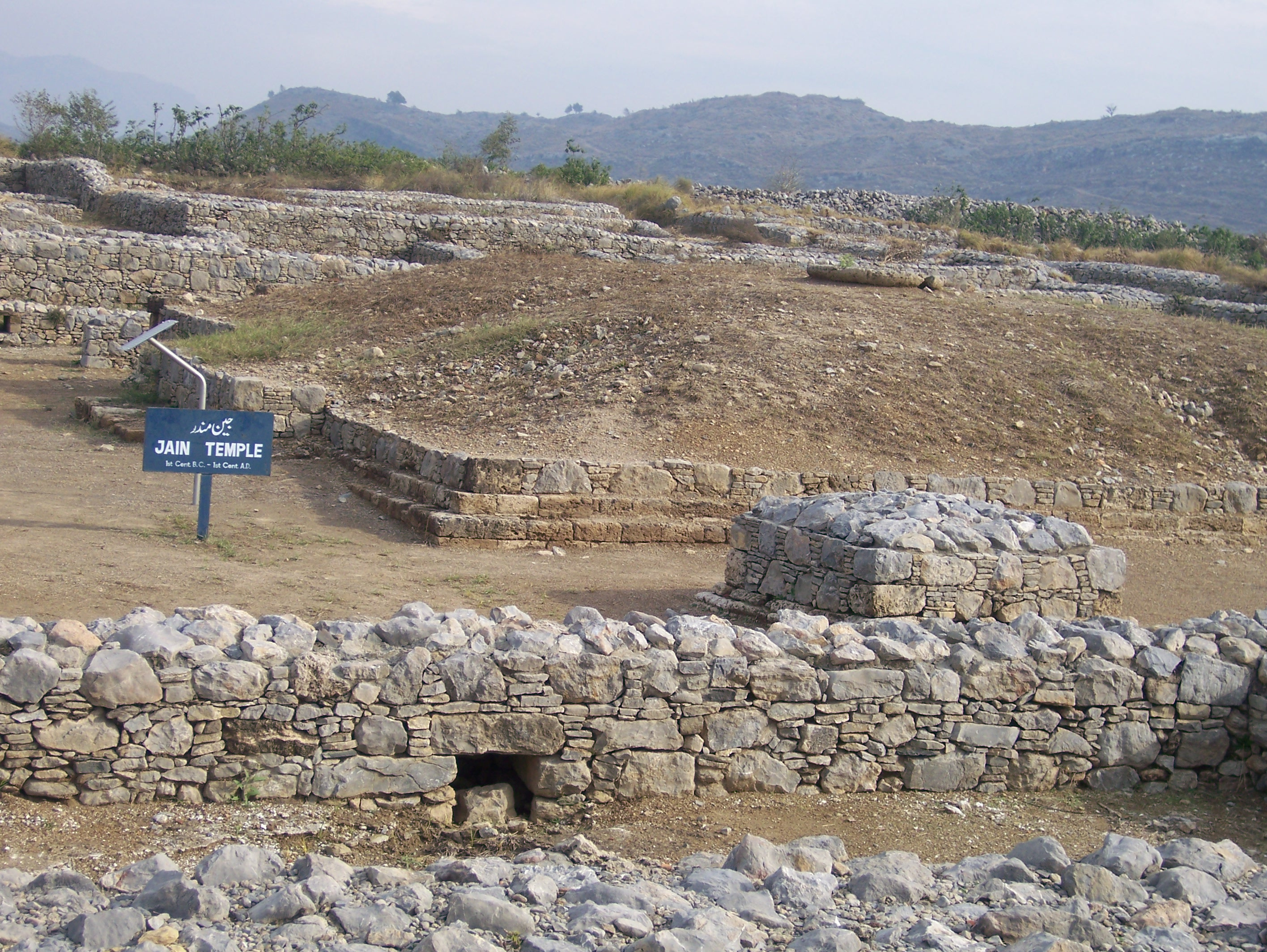
A Jain Temple at Sirkap, part of the Indo-Greek kingdom, near modern-day Taxila, Punjab, Pakistan

Several ancient Jain shrines are scattered across the country. Baba Dharam Dass was a holy man whose tomb is located near the bank of a creek called (Deoka or Deokay or Degh) near Chawinda Phatic, behind the agricultural main office in Pasrur, near the city of Sialkot in Punjab, Pakistan. Another prominent Jain monk of the region was Vijayanandsuri of Gujranwala, whose samadhi (memorial shrine) still stands in the city.

=== Buddhism ===
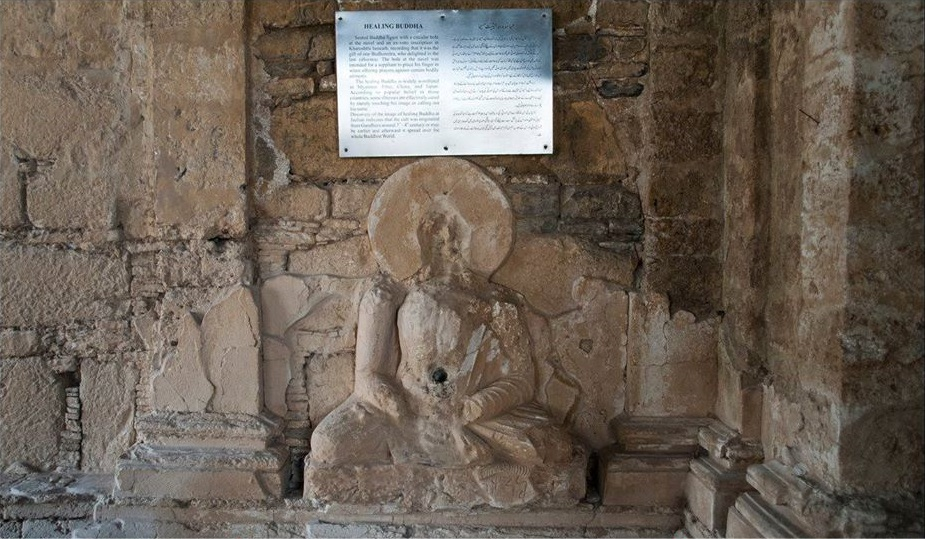
A statue of Buddha (at Jaulian, Taxila) with a hole in the navel is an odd artifact. It is called the "Healing Buddha". Buddhist pilgrims put their fings in the navel hole and pray for the ailment of the patients.

Buddhism has an ancient history in Pakistan; currently there is a small community of at least 1,500 Pakistani Buddhists in the country. The country is dotted with numerous ancient and disused Buddhist stupas along the entire breadth of the Indus River that courses through the heart of the country. Many Buddhist empires and city states existed, notably in Gandhara but also elsewhere in Taxila, Punjab and Sindh.

The number of Buddhist voters was 1,884 in 2017 and are mostly concentrated in Sindh and Punjab.

=== Judaism ===
Various estimates suggest that there were about 1,500 Jews living in Pakistan at the time of its independence on 14 August 1947, with the majority living in Karachi and a few living in Peshawar. However, almost all emigrated to Israel after 1948. There are a few disused synagogues in both cities; while one Karachi synagogue was torn down for the construction of a shopping mall. The one in Peshawar still exists, although the building is not being used for any religious purpose. There is a small Jewish community of Pakistani origin settled in Ramla, Israel.

One Pakistani, Faisal Khalid (a.k.a. Fishel Benkhald) of Karachi claims to be Pakistan's only Jew. He claimed that his mother is Jewish (making him Jewish by Jewish custom) but, his father is a Muslim. Pakistani authorities have issued him a passport that stated Judaism as his religion and have allowed him to travel to Israel.

=== Irreligion ===
Irreligion is present among a minority of mainly young people in Pakistan. There are people who do not profess any faith (such as atheists and agnostics) in Pakistan, but their numbers are not known. They are particularly in the affluent areas of the larger cities. Some were born in secular families while others in religious ones. According to the 1998 census, people who did not state their religion accounted for 0.5% of the population, but social pressure against claiming no religion was strong. A 2012 study by Gallup Pakistan found that people not affiliated to any religion account for 1% of the population. Many atheists in Pakistan have been lynched and imprisoned over unsubstantiated allegations of blasphemy. When the state initiated a full-fledged crackdown on atheism since 2017, it has become worse with secular bloggers being kidnapped and the government running advertisements urging people to identify blasphemers among them and the highest judges declaring such people to be terrorists.

== Freedom of religion in Pakistan ==
A few aspects of secularism have also been adopted by Pakistani constitution from British colonial concept. In 2022, Freedom House rated Pakistan’s religious freedom as 1 out of 4, noting that the blasphemy laws are often exploited by religious vigilantes and also curtail the freedom of expression by Christians and Muslims, especially Ahmadi Muslims. Hindus have spoken of vulnerability to kidnapping and forced conversions. Pakistan, a Muslim-majority country of about 220 million, is often under fire for crimes against members of its religious minorities, including Christians, Ahmadi Shi’ite Muslims and wahabi Muslims and Hindus.

== See also ==
- Blasphemy law in Pakistan
- Demographics of Pakistan
- List of religious populations
- Major religious groups
- Religious Minorities in Pakistan
- Shamanism in Pakistan
- Freedom of religion in Pakistan
- Pakistan National Commission for Minorities
- Secularism in Pakistan
