= Ginani =

Annual harvest rite in Northern Pakistan

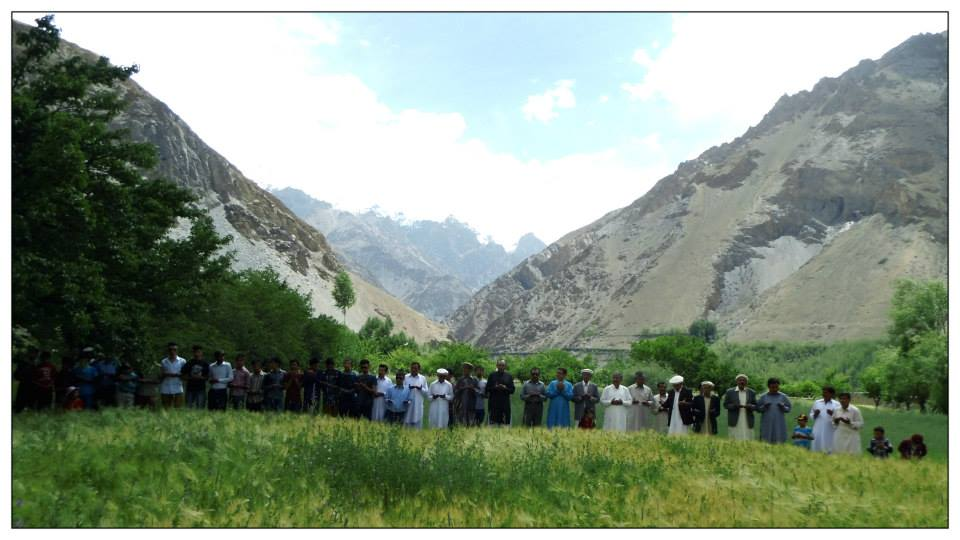
Ginani day gathering

Ginani holds significant cultural importance as an annual harvest tradition observed in the valleys of Hunza and Nagar in Northern Pakistan. The celebration occurs on the summer solstice, marking the 21st of June, the longest day of the year.

== History ==
Ginani is observed as a celebration of a crop that has come into a position to be harvested. Hunza/Nagar valleys were once remote mountainious valleys, that was subjected to sporadic famines. So the farmers celebrated that their crops are not damaged by extreme weather conditions and they can survive the harsh seasons coming their way. Before 1974, the emperor of the Hunza Nagar state arranged the ‘Ginani’ celebrations in his court.

== Ginani celebrations ==
In Hunza the celebrations starts around ten days before the Ginani. Musicians at Altit Fort play tunes that are called Hareeps in Burushaski, for ten days till the Ginani day. The festival featured "Taj Poshi" ceremonies, polo matches, tug-of-war competitions, musical performances, and food distribution.

On the day of Ginani, people gather at the a place called Chattaq, near the royal palace. In the case of Hunza, people gather at chattaq located at Baltit Fort.

Mir is presented and visits the fields of wheat, where butter is spread over the wheat plants. Prayers are offered for prosperity and for betterment of community. A bunch of wheat plants is taken with them. Wheat grains are extracted from husk and cooked.

Cooked wheat grains are put into Diltar (Lassi), which is offered to the people gathered there.

Then comes the musical and dance performances. Mir dances first to the music. Then music is played, in a specific order tribes dance to the music.

Earlier, for most of the times Bitans used to perform at Ginani, to foretell the future on the orders of Mir.

== See also ==
- Hunza Valley
- Nagar Valley
- Shamanism in Hunza
- Mir of Hunza
