= Shamanism in Pakistan =

Pakistani

Hunza, Pakistan, has been famous for its practices in Shamanism. Shaman in the local language Burushaski are referred as "بِٹَن"-'Bitan', in Shina as "دیال"-'Dayal', and in Urdu as "کاہن"-'Kahin'. Shamanism in the area has been linked to its dynamic history.

== Bitan ==
Bitan is the Burushaski equivalent of Shaman. Bitans are not like the Eurasian Shamans, as the Eurasian Shamans have some special physical qualities like extra teeth, a sixth finger, or other physical signs. Dayals are normal beings who are selected by the Pari (the fairy, plural pariting).

In Bitan culture, Pariting descend to the earth during the cherry and apricot blossoming seasons. The Pariting choose the Dayal from newborns by smelling their noses and mouths. It is not apparent who is a dayal during childhood. Bitans grow distinct characteristics when they reach their adolescent years. These characteristics includes becoming unconscious, going into a state of ecstasy, or sickness for days or sometimes weeks. A Bitan may die if he (his spirit) resists to be one during the period when the shamanist's characteristics start to appear.

The Dayal have craving for music (a special tune/composition); on listening to such music they can go into a state of trance where they meet with the pari. Bitans dance to the music during festivals like Ginani (crop harvesting festival). During the dance, dayal also foretell the next year's crop production.

== Shamanic practices ==
Shamans or the Dayals are believed to have foresight. This foresight is a result of the Dayal's interactions with spirits. These spirits are fairies, pari (plural pariting) as called in the local language. The paris tell the dayals about the future when they are in an ecstatic/trance state. Thus they foretell the future.

=== The ritual ===
The ritual to get the dayal into the shamanistic or the ecstatic state needs music, smoke and goat blood m. Music is played by the musicians (dadag ustadi). The orchestra has three instruments, namely Dadang (Drum), Daamal (two hemi-spherical drums) and Surnai (Shenai) or Gabi (local variant of reed pipe). For the smoke, juniper leaves and Syrian rue (local name Supandur) are ignited, letting the dayal inhale this smoke. For blood, the dayal drinks it from the recently chopped head of a goat (Chati).

Dayal starts to dance to the music. While dancing dayal inhales the smoke of juniper leaves simultaneously. Then drinking the blood from Chati, dayal gets into a higher state as he continues to dance to the music. Reaching the state the dayal starts to speak in Shina (language of Gilgit). Dayal converses/argues/ask the pari regarding the concern he has. During the process dayal may pass out. Dayal can go to such state for at most two or three times before he passes out.

== Significance of goat blood ==
Shamans often consume goat blood in order to get into a higher state of trance during rituals or ceremonies. However, consuming goat blood is not a must and it depends on the Shaman. According to Shaman culture, it must happen at least once during a lifetime and only the first time a Shaman consumes goat blood is the most significant, which happens in the early years of a Shaman's life. The performers of Shaman claims witnessing a fairy (Pari) giving him Milk in the glass however he drinks the blood of goat while his spirit is inside the fairy land (Paristan). This concept is also used to tell the Future in northern Pakistan

== History ==
Historians like M.H. Sidky, have done extensive research on the topic of Shamanism. Sidky has published a paper on Shamanism in the Hunza region in which he mentions the famous Bitans of the area, including Huk Mamu and Shon Gakur.

Bitans of Hunza used to tell future by doing the shamanic practices. Bitans were summoned by the Thum/Mir to predict any calamity, famine or any disaster expected in near future.
