= NA-228 Dadu-II =

Constituency of the National Assembly of Pakistan

- Constituency for the National Assembly of Pakistan
- Region: Dadu and Johi Tehsils of Dadu District
- Electorate: 451,062

Current constituency
- Party: Pakistan People's Party
- Member: Rafiq Ahmed Jamali
- Created from: NA-232 Dadu-II

NA-228 Dadu-II (این اے-228، دادُو-2) is a constituency for the National Assembly of Pakistan.

== Assembly Segments ==
Constituency number	Constituency	District	Current MPA	Party
82	PS-82 Dadu-III	Dadu District	Pir Mujeeb ul Haq	PPP
83	PS-83 Dadu-IV	Dadu District	Pir Saleh Shah Jeelani	PPP

== Members of Parliament ==
=== 2018–2023: NA-235 Dadu-II ===
Election	Member	Party
2018	Rafiq Ahmed Jamali	PPPP

=== 2024–present: NA-228 Dadu-II ===
Election	Member	Party
2024	Rafiq Ahmed Jamali	PPPP

== Election 2002 ==
General elections were held on 10 October 2002. Rafiq Ahmed Jamali of PPP won by 56,814 votes.

General election 2002: NA-232 Dadu-II
Party	Candidate	Votes	%	±%
PPP	Rafique Ahmed Jamali	56,814	56.32	
PML(Q)	Ahmed Khan Lund	41,982	41.62	
Others	Others (four candidates)	2,077	2.06	
Turnout		103,501	37.32	
Total valid votes		100,873	97.46	
Rejected ballots		2,628	2.54	
Majority		14,832	14.70	
Registered electors		277,302		

== Election 2008 ==
General elections were held on 18 February 2008. Rafiq Ahmed Jamali of PPP won by 87,467 votes.

General election 2008: NA-232 Dadu-II
Party	Candidate	Votes	%	±%
PPP	Rafique Ahmed Jamali	87,467	71.59	
PML(Q)	Liquat Ali Khan Jatoi	34,019	27.84	
Others	Others (eight candidates)	690	0.57	
Turnout		125,410	32.21	
Total valid votes		122,176	97.42	
Rejected ballots		3,234	2.58	
Majority		53,448	43.75	
Registered electors		389,341		
PPP hold				

== Election 2013 ==
General elections were held on 11 May 2013. Rafiq Ahmed Jamali of PPP won by 76,876 votes and became the member of National Assembly.

General election 2013: NA-232 Dadu-II
Party	Candidate	Votes	%	±%
PPP	Rafique Ahmed Jamali	76,876	49.18	
PML(N)	Karim Ali Jatoi	56,838	36.36	
PML(F)	Chakar Khan Shahani	13,665	8.74	
Independent	Muhammad Pervaiz Bhurt	5,465	3.50	
Others	Others (twelve candidates)	3,487	2.22	
Turnout		163,016	54.40	
Total valid votes		156,331	95.90	
Rejected ballots		6,685	4.10	
Majority		20,038	12.82	
Registered electors		299,644		
PPP hold				

== Election 2018 ==
General elections were held on 25 July 2018.

General election 2018: NA-235 Dadu-II
Party	Candidate	Votes	%	±%
PPP	Rafiq Ahmed Jamali	81,200	47.93	
PTI	Karim Ali Jatoi	63,008	37.19	
Others	Others (eight candidates)	25,198	14.88	
Turnout		178,696	49.67	
Total valid votes		169,406	94.80	
Rejected ballots		9,290	5.20	
Majority		18,192	10.74	
Registered electors		359,762		
PPP hold		Swing	N/A	

== Election 2024 ==
Elections were held on 8 February 2024. Rafiq Ahmed Jamali won the election with 98,873 votes.

General election 2024: NA-228 Dadu-II
Party	Candidate	Votes	%	±%
PPP	Rafiq Ahmed Jamali	98,873	58.25	▲10.32
GDA	Karim Ali Jatoi	49,302	29.05	
Others	Others (thirteen candidates)	21,558	12.70	
Turnout		178,310	39.53	▼10.14
Total valid votes		169,733	95.19	
Rejected ballots		8,577	4.81	
Majority		49,571	29.21	▲18.47
Registered electors		451,062		
PPP hold				

== See also ==
- NA-227 Dadu-I
- NA-229 Karachi Malir-I
