= Ancient graves in Wahi Pandhi =

Burial site in Sindh, Pakistan

The Ancient Graves are situated near Wahi Pandhi, Johi tehsil, Dadu District, Sindh, Pakistan, on the top of the hills near foothills of Kirthar Mountains Range. These columned graves are constructed with large slabs of stone on ground surface. The graves are open from northern and southern sides. The western and eastern sides of graves are constructed with stone slabs and also the graves are covered from upper side with slabs. The corpse were placed on ground surface in the graves. The bones can be observed in columned graves on ground surfaces in graves. Due to inscribed word "Behdin" on stone of one grave, it is believed that these ancient graves belonged to Zoroastrians. The word behdin means the good religion which is related to Zoroastrianism.

== History ==
Two Burial places of the ancient graves in Wahi Pandhi are sited along both banks of Narri or Nalli hilly torrent are locally called roman’s graves. Both necropolises can be counted of different periods. The awning of Smail Fakir is the sole monument of the desert of Kachho which is constructed with heavy carved pillars without any material. The Ceiling stones of the canopy are expertly engraved with gorgeous Sun-like structure. The graves are built with yellowish stone blocks. It seems no any material was used for fitting stone slabs together with. Many memorial names and other inscriptions are inscribed on stones to be belied in Kufi or Persian language script. It is believed that these belong to the invading period of Alexander the Great and some scholars are of the opinion that these ancient graves belong to Baloch tribe but question arises that which Baloch tribe had tradition to keep corpse in open or columned graves with carved stone slabs. Bherumal Maharchan Adwani considers the graves of Zoroastrians. In Sindh, invasion of Persia Iran can be traced from Daruish-1. In 637 AD, during the battle of Qadisia, the Muslims invaded Persia. The Zoroastrians were called Gabrs in the reflection Gabr, the Zoroastrians called themselves Behdin or Bahadin. Many Gabr or Gabar as well Givar Bands are constructed near hilly torrents for collecting waters in Kirthar Mountains Range which indicate to Zoroastrians. Zoroastrians or Parsis still live in Pakistan and India. History reveals that Zoroastrians or Parsis migrated from Iran to Punjab, Pakistan and Sindh, Pakistan.
