= Drigh Bala =

Pakistani town

Coordinates: 26°47′N 67°25′E

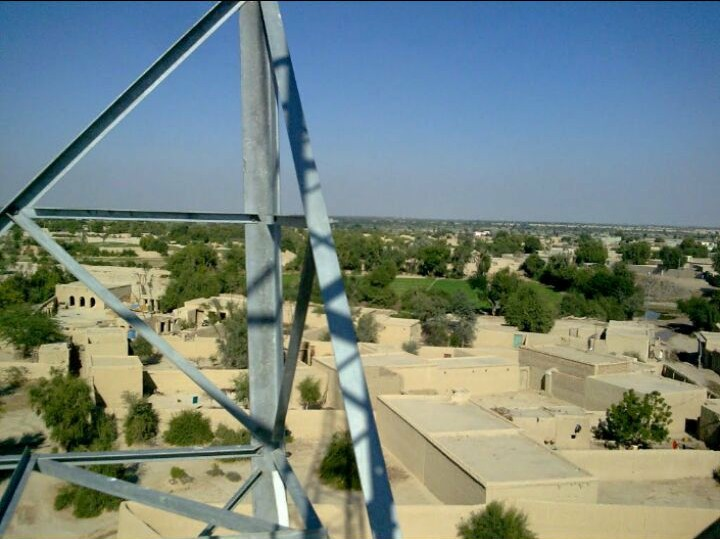
Drigh Bala

Drigh Bala (Urdu: :ڈرگھ بالا ، Sindhi: :ڊرگھ بالا) is a historical town in Johi Taluka of Dadu District, Sindh, Pakistan, located in the Kachho desert near the Nai Gaj. It was established by Talpur Amirs during the early Kalhora period. The graveyard of Mir Allahyar Talpur-I is situated close to this town. This Kalhora Dynasty and Talpur Dynasty necropolis is considered a historical heritage of the Sindh people. The town has an educational facility that admits students to the secondary level. Serving the area is a Rural Health Center.
