= Ali Murad Mound =

Archaeological site in Pakistan

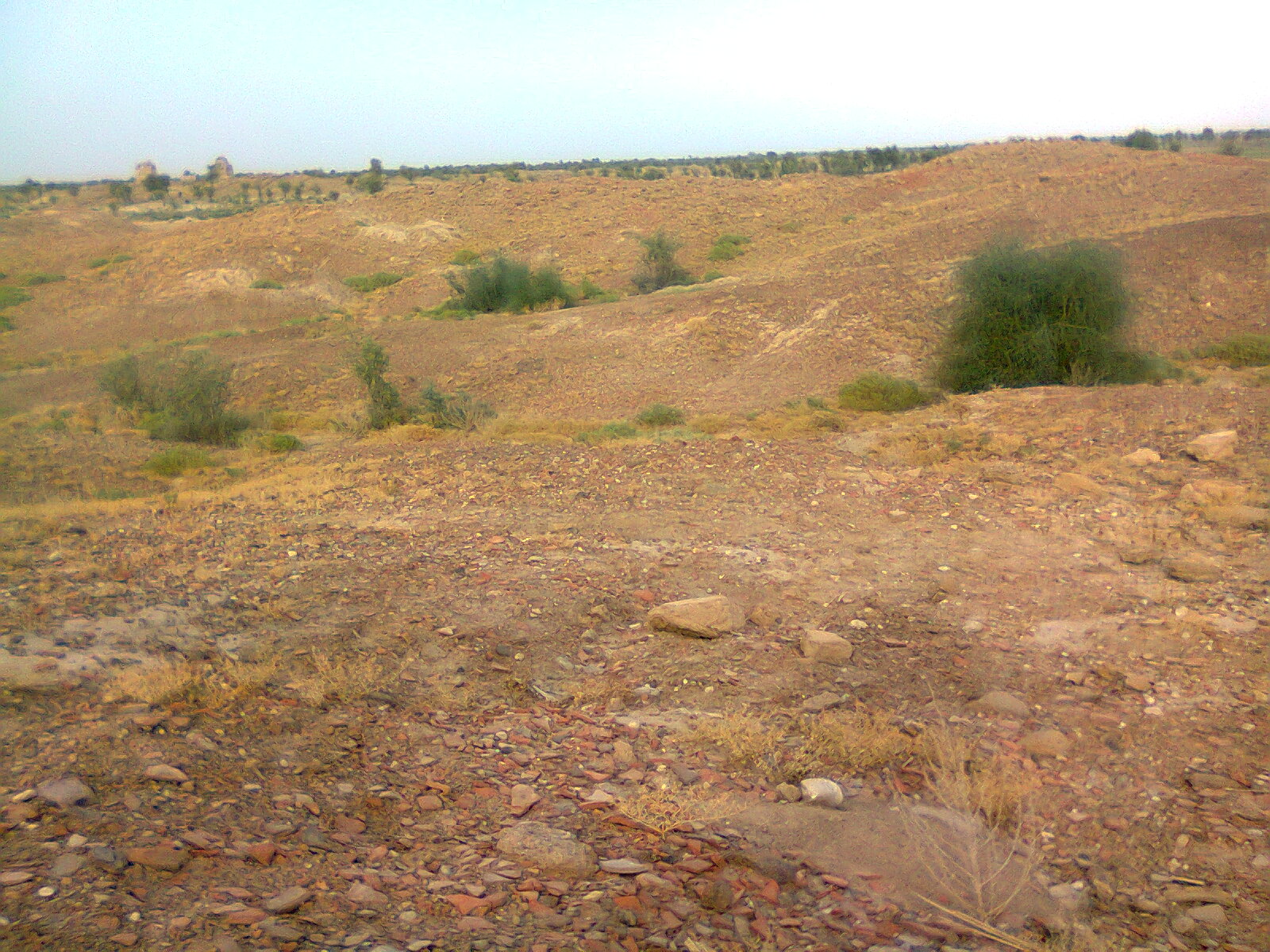
Mound of village Ali Murad

The Ali Murad Mound is an archaeological site situated at Johi Tehsil, in Dadu District of Sindh, Pakistan. The site was explored as well as named by archaeologist N. G. Majumdar.

It is located 20 miles from Dadu towards the southwest. It is eight miles from Ghazi Shah Mound and 14 miles to the south of Johi town.

At the top of the mound, an ancient hamlet was discovered surrounded by defensive walls built with stone blocks. According to Mortimer Wheeler, the pottery of Harappan culture, terracotta figurines of bull and pig, chert flakes, a small bronze axe, beads of steatite, agate and carnelian and several terracotta of imitation cakes were found here. The fortified antique village or palace was recorded on this high mound.
