= Ancient Rock Carvings of Sindh =

Historical site in Sindh, Pakistan

The Ancient Rock Carvings of Sindh have been explored in Kirthar Mountains Range, Sindh, Pakistan. The Kirthar Mountains Range covers a distance of 190 miles (300 Kilometers) in boundaries of Jacobabad District, Qambar Shahdadkot District, Dadu District and Jamshoro District from north to south up to Karachi, Sindh.

== Rock carving sites ==
The numerous sites of ancient rock carvings have been discovered where ancient rock art is engraved on rocks. The sites are located at Hur Dhoro (natural water spring), Zainy Dhoro (a hollow where water of hill torrent collects), Peepal spring, Pachhal, Sado-Mado. Whereas, the dhoris (little ponds of water in the bed of hilly streams) in vicinity of the Nai Gaj Valley which is located at a distance of 38 km towards west of Johi town in Johi tehsil, Dadu District, Sindh, are the Shakloi Dhoro, Phazgar Dhori, Gurban Dhoro, Met Dhori, Makhi Dhori, Faizoo Garoti, Sakey Dand, Gurban Dhoro. The Kalri Dhoro in surroundings of Nari/Nali hill stream while Kashani Dhoro in neighborhood of Nain Taki (hilly torrent) in Johi tehsil Dadu District, at the same time as along the banks of hill streams of Mazarani, Shahaar and Keharji near Qambar, Larkana District (now Qambar Shahdadkot District) and Nai Dilaan in Dadu district. The rock art is too explored near hill torrents of Sallari, Khurbi, Radh, Saghro, Buri, Khenji, Chhahar, Seeta, the Kukrani, Haleli, Anghai, Khandani, Naing, Bandhani, Osho and Baz Khando in Kirthar mountains range. The rock carvings also have been discovered nearby Gadap Town at Gadap Tehsil of Karachi district. Undoubtedly, Dadu District is more abundant in ancient rock carvings of Sindh.

== Engravings ==
Different kinds of engravings are engraved herein rock carvings of Sindh. The petroglyphs of bullock-cart, Sun towers, unicorns, Sindh ibexes, humped bulls, many stupas related to Buddhism, animals like lions, wolves, camels, dancing women, right swastikas, wild-sheep, double and single humped camels, leopards, dogs, men with bows and arrows in attacking position, horse and camel riders, hunters with muzzle-load guns, men and women in pairs and in dancing style, wheels, fencing, rows of dots, hunting scenes while hunting Sindh ibexes with guns, rite dance, archers, swords bison, cut-marks fire altars and a fire temple of Zoroastrianism including dancing girls are engraved on rocks shelters, Buddhism is more dominant subject of rock carvings in Kirthar Range, Sindh. The ancient inscriptions of Brahmi script or Brahman script and Kharosthi scripts are as well inscribed in these ancient rock carvings of Sindh.

== Ancientness ==
Some research scholars of Sindh are of the opinion that these rock carvings belong to Neolithic and Chalcolithic periods. According to some other anthropologists and research scholars of Sindh, this art of rock carvings is prehistoric and it had been executed on rock shelters from Bronze Age to medieval and post medieval periods.
