= Shah Hasan, Sindh =

Pakistani village

Shah Hasan Shāh Hasan, Shah Hassan
- Deh
- Location in Sindh Shah Hasan (Pakistan)
- Coordinates: 26.440417°N 67.566905°E
- Country: Pakistan
- Region: Sindh
- District: Dadu
- Tehsil: Johi

Population (2017)
  - Total: 2,597
- Time zone: UTC+5 (PST)
  - Summer (DST): UTC+6 (PDT)

Shah Hasan, also spelled Shah Hassan, is a village and deh in Johi Tehsil of Dadu District, Sindh. It is located at the western end of Lake Manchar, about 24 miles west of Sehwan. As of 2017, Shah Hasan has a population of 2,597, in 481 households. It is the seat of a tappedar circle, which also includes the villages of Berah, Dhabhari, Dhori Kunri, Khanwah, Lohri, and Makhan Belo.

Shah Hasan hosts a fair on the 9th of Zilhuz in honour of Pir Gaji, a famous Sufi pir whose tomb is located on a hilly spur six miles west of the village.

Around 1874, Shah Hasan had an estimated population of about 1,200, including about 880 Muslims (mostly Mohanas and Bughios) and about 320 Hindus (mostly Lohanos). Its main manufactured products were ropes and mats made from the pfis, a type of dwarf palm. There was a local trade in grain, fish, and mats, but no significant long-distance commerce. Shah Hasan was then the seat of a tappedar and had a small police post, a dharamsala, and a cattle pound. The Pir Gaji festival had an average attendance of about 600 people at this time.

The 1951 census recorded the village of Shah Hasan as having an estimated population of about 740, in about 140 houses. It had a school and police station at that point.
