= Nai Gaj Dam =

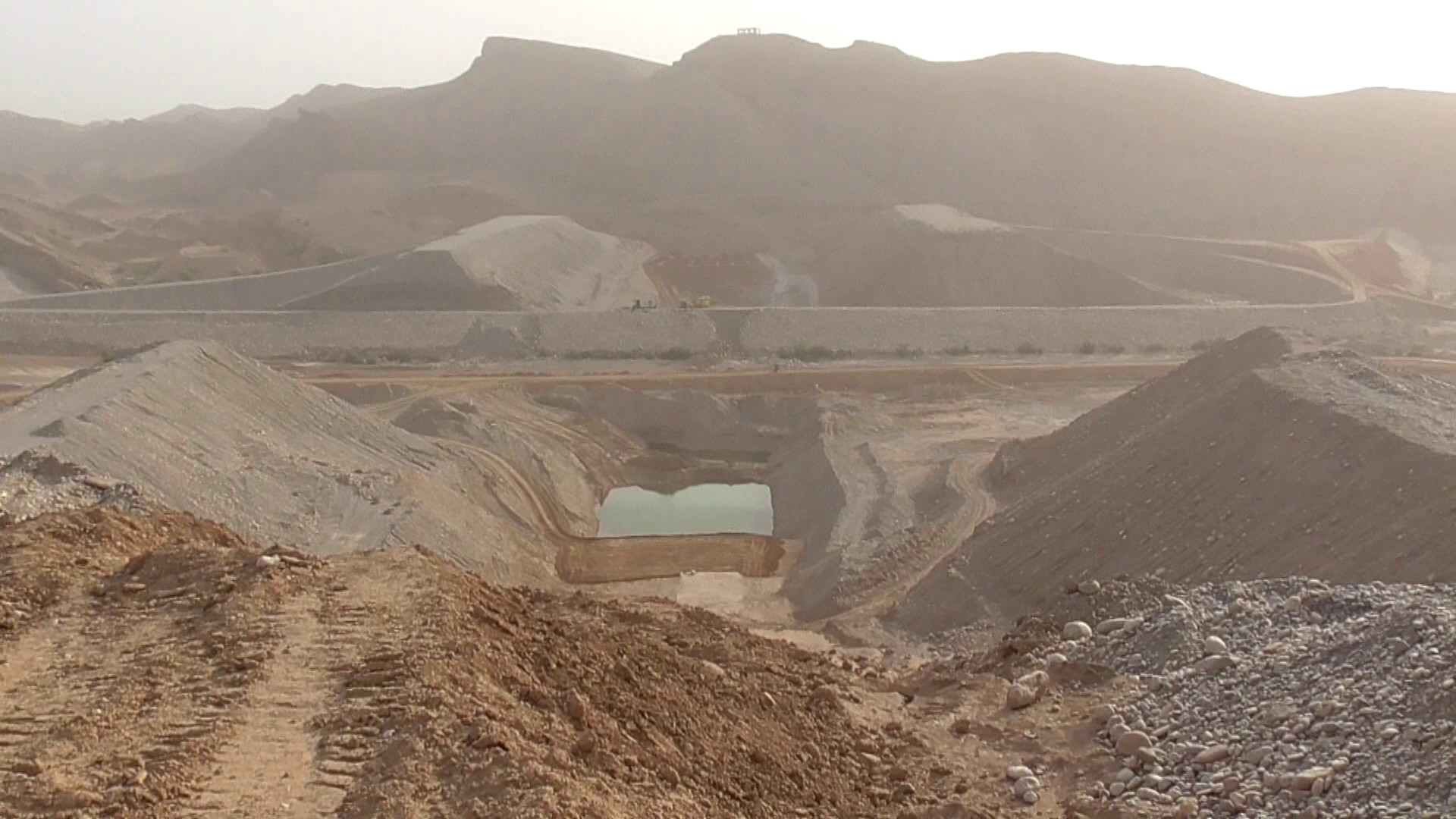
- Construction of Nai Gaj Dam

- Location within Pakistan
- Official name: Nai Gaj Dam
- Location: Dadu District, Sindh, Pakistan
- Coordinates: 26°52′32″N 67°19′14″E
- Status: Under construction
- Construction began: 2012
- Opening date: June 2027(exp.)
- Owner: Water and Power Development Authority (WAPDA)

Dam and spillways
- Impounds: Gaj River
- Height: 194 ft (59 m)
- Length: 714 ft (218 m)

Nai Gaj Dam
- Operator: WAPDA
- Installed capacity: 4.2 MW

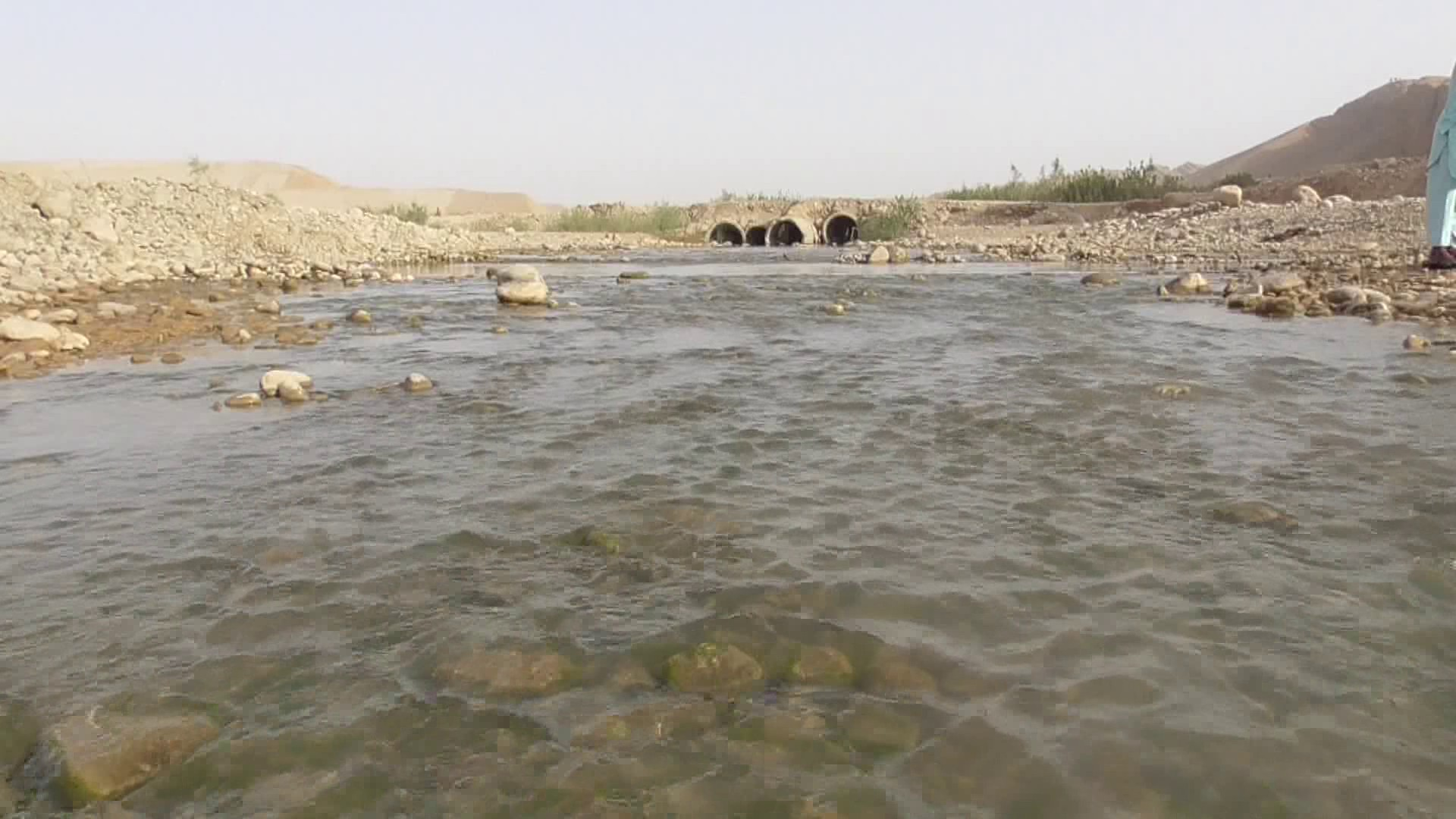
A flow of Nai Gaj to Nai Gaj Dam

Nai Gaj Dam is an embankment dam currently under construction on the Gaj River in the gorge area at the edge of Kirthar Mountains range at about 65 kilometres (40 mi) north-west of Dadu city in Dadu District, Sindh Province of Pakistan. When complete, its power station will have a 4.2 MW installed capacity. Consultant supervision by Techno Consult International (TCI) from Karachi, Pakistan.

== Construction ==
Construction of the dam started in May 2012. Initially planned to be completed in 3 years, the project has been heavily delayed, increasing its cost from an initial estimate of Rs17 Billion to a revised Rs 47.7 Billion in 2019. Around 51% of the construction work was completed as of 2018. The dam is now expected to be completed in 2027.

It is estimated that water will be supplied from Nai Gaj Dam to 11,655 ha (28,800 acres) land in tehsil Johi and 121,406 ha (300,000 acres) in other areas of Dadu District. Moreover, Nai Gaj Dam will supply 50 cusecs of water to the Lake Manchar for decreasing its pollution. Furthermore, the water will also be supplied from the dam to Kachho desert and area of Kohistan in Dadu District. PM Imran Khan vowed to complete the project and expressed concern over ineptitude of sindh government.https://www.dawn.com/news/1618684

== Salient features ==
Type of dam: Earth core rockfill dam.
Height of dam: 59 m
Live storage: 0.16 MAF
Gross storage: 0.30 MAF
Dead storage: 0.140 MAF
Sedimentation load: 214.31 cubic metres per square kilometre
Fuse plug capacity: 74000 Cusecs
Spillway capacity: 253000 Cusecs
Command area: 16,187 ha (40,000 acres)
Cropped area: 32,375 ha (80,000 acres)
Cropping intensity: 200%
Power house installed capacity: 4.2 MW
Project cost (2009): Rs.28.153 Billion (Revised)
EIRR: 13.18%
B.C. ratio: 1.32:1

== See also ==
- List of dams and reservoirs in Pakistan
- List of power stations in Pakistan
- Nai Gaj
