= Lake Manchar =

Largest freshwater lake in Pakistan

Manchar
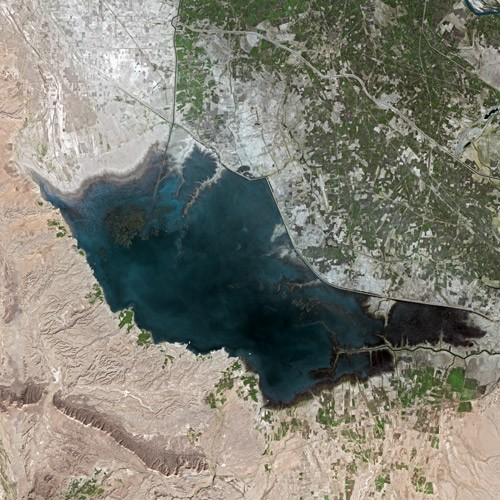
- Interactive map of Manchar
- Location: Lake Manchar is located at a distance of 18 kilometers from Sehwan Sharif on west side of the River Indus, in district Jamshoro.
- Coordinates: 26.41°N 67.68°E
- Lake type: reservoir
- Part of: Indus River basin
- Primary inflows: Aral Wah Canal, Danister Canal, Nai Gaj
- Primary outflows: Indus River
- Basin countries: Pakistan
- Max. length: 23.5 km (14.6 mi)
- Max. width: 12.08 km (7.51 mi)
- Surface area: 228 to 250 km^{2} (88 to 97 sq mi)
- Max. depth: 5 m (16 ft)
- Water volume: 600,000 acre⋅ft (740,000,000 m^{3})
- Surface elevation: 35 m (115 ft)
- Islands: various islands and islets

Lake Manchar (Sindhi: منڇر ڍنڍ, Urdu: منچھر جھیل), also spelled Manchhar, is the largest natural freshwater lake in Pakistan, and one of the largest in South Asia. It is located west of the Indus River, in Jamshoro and Dadu districts of Sindh, 18 kilometres (11 mi) away from Sehwan. Lake Manchar collects water from numerous small streams in the Kirthar Mountains, and then empties into the Indus River. The lake's surface area fluctuates with the seasons, from as little as 36 km^{2}, to as much as 500 km^{2} during monsoon rains.

== History ==
The lake's banks and vicinity are home to ancient archaeological sites Ghazi Shah, Wahi Pandhi and Ali Murad Mound. The sites of Lal Chatto, Mashak Lohri and Lakhiyo situated along the bank of Lake Manchar are the most ancient sites, which date from the Harappan culture.

The lake was formed when a branch of the Indus River flowed from Kashmore. In 1921, it was connected to Hamal Lake via the Main Nara Valley Drain. In 1958, the lake completely evaporated due to drought. Between 10 August and 23 August 2009, 700 cu ft/s (20 m^{3}/s) of water was introduced in the lake via Indus River. In the 2010 Pakistan floods, the lake overflowed due to the high inflow of water.

During the 2022 Pakistan floods, Manchar again overflowed, and efforts were made to assist its drainage. Engineers made a breach in the lake to assist its drainage to protect the city of Sehwan and the town of Bhan Syedabad, at the cost of flooding many villages with a population of 150,000 people. Officials had hoped the ploy would protect up to 500,000 people from flooding.

== Geography ==
Lake Manchar is directly south of Hamal Lake, and the two are connected by the Main Nara Valley Drain built in 1921. Manchar lake's surface area fluctuates with the seasons - from as little as 200 km^{2} to as much as 500 km^{2} during monsoon rains. The average depth is only 2.5 to 3.75 metres. It is 6 metres lower than the bed of the Indus, and sometimes catches floodwater from the river, while in winter when the river is low, water flows from the lake into the Indus. Freshwater flow from canals amounts to 1.54 MAF, and rainfall in the area averages only 4.46 inches annual.

The southern end of the lake is at the base of the Laki Hills, a branch of the Kirthar Mountains, and water flows to the Indus via the Aral channel, and Danister Canal.

== Environmental degradation ==
The lake supports thousands of fisherfolk, who depend on the freshwater fish in the lake. The lake since construction of the Main Nara Valley Drain in 1921 has undergone environmental degradation with inflow of sewage. Consequently, the water quality of the lake has been degraded.

The diversion of water from the Indus and a diminished storm runoff from the Kirthar mountains have contributed to the reduction in fresh water supplies, resulting in the water becoming saline, and killing off fish. At the same time, saline drainage water from agricultural fields of Balochistan and surrounding areas flows into Lake Manchar. The lake was a stop-off on the Indus flyway for Siberian migratory birds, but the numbers have fallen from 25,000 birds counted in 1988 to 2,800 birds counted in 2002, because the lake no longer provides the birds' main food, the lake fish. In the place of the birds, the lake now hosts a saline water reed.

The lake also provided large volumes of water for irrigation, but this has also been reduced and has resulted in a great reduction in the area irrigated by the lake. Right Bank Outfall Drain is being built to save the lake from contamination through inflow of sewage. Construction of the Nai Gaj Dam upstream from the lake will result in freshwater being discharged into the lake throughout the year, instead of seasonally, which should improve the lake's waters. The lake water monitored for water quality before and after super flood 2010, and explained water quality, sediments and runoff water through main Nara valley drain (MNVD) and right bank out fall drain (RBOD) stage-III.

== Population ==
Lake Manchar is populated by the Mohana tribe, who are sometimes referred to as the "Boat People." The lake supports thousands of fisherfolk, who depend on the freshwater fish in the lake.

== See also ==
- Environmental degradation
- Indus River
- List of lakes of Pakistan
- Kalankar lake
