= PS-82 Dadu-III =

Constituency of the Provincial Assembly of Sindh, Pakistan

- Constituency for the Provincial Assembly of Sindh
- Region: Dadu Tehsil (partly) including Dadu city of Dadu District
- Electorate: 209,564

Current constituency
- Member: Vacant
- Created from: PS-74 Dadu-IV (2002-2018); PS-85 Dadu-III (2018-2023)

PS-82 Dadu-III (پی ایس-82، دادو-3) is a constituency of the Provincial Assembly of Sindh.

== General elections 2024 ==
Provincial election 2024: PS-82 Dadu-III
Party	Candidate	Votes	%	±%
PPP	Pir Mujeeb ul Haq	44,565	58.23	
GDA	Ashique Ali Zounr	19,618	25.63	
TLP	Mushtaq Ahmed Abro	2,990	3.91	
PTI	Zulfiqar Ali Mallah (Note: Filed nomination papers as PTI candidate but ECP allowed him to run as an Independent)	2,642	3.45	
Independent	Aftab Ahmed	2,466	3.22	
Independent	Syed Ameer Ahmed Bukhari	968	1.27	
Others	Others (fifteen candidates)	3,290	4.29	
Turnout		79,616	37.99	
Total valid votes		76,539	96.14	
Rejected ballots		3,077	3.86	
Majority		24,947	32.60	
Registered electors		209,564		
PPP hold				

== General elections 2018 ==
Provincial election 2018: PS-85 Dadu-III
Party	Candidate	Votes	%	±%
PPP	Pir Mujeeb Ul Haq	47,393	58.34	
PTI	Ashique Ali Zaur	26,795	32.98	
Independent	Asif Nawaz	2,698	3.32	
Independent	Haji Khan Surhio	1,378	1.70	
Independent	Safia	1,208	1.49	
MMA	Syed Fida Hussain Kazmi	793	0.98	
PPP(SB)	Ali Muhammad Jamali	289	0.36	
Tabdeeli Pasand Party Pakistan	Ghulam Qadir Solangi	108	0.13	
PSP	Arz Muhammad	85	0.10	
Independent	Mir Jan Muhammad Khan Panhwar	79	0.10	
Independent	Abdullah Khan Baloch	74	0.09	
Amun Taraqqi Party	Hussain Bux Solangi	49	0.06	
Independent	Sahib Babar	44	0.05	
Independent	Shahjahan	41	0.05	
Independent	Ali Nawaz Rind	40	0.05	
Independent	Syed Muahammad Shah	37	0.05	
Independent	Imran Muhammad Liaque	33	0.04	
Independent	Ghulam Hassan Shah	25	0.03	
Independent	Ghulam Mustafa	22	0.03	
Independent	Sarfraz Nabi Lund Balouch	17	0.02	
Independent	Ghulam Hyder Khoso	17	0.02	
Independent	Altaf Ahmed Samo	12	0.01	
Majority		20,598	25.36	
Valid ballots		81,237		
Rejected ballots		4,135		
Turnout		85,372		
Registered electors		180,092		
hold				

== General elections 2013 ==
Contesting candidates	Party affiliation	Votes polled

== General elections 2008 ==
Contesting candidates	Party affiliation	Votes polled

== See also ==
- PS-81 Dadu-II
- PS-83 Dadu-IV
