= Shiva Mandir, Johi =

Shiv Mandir Johi
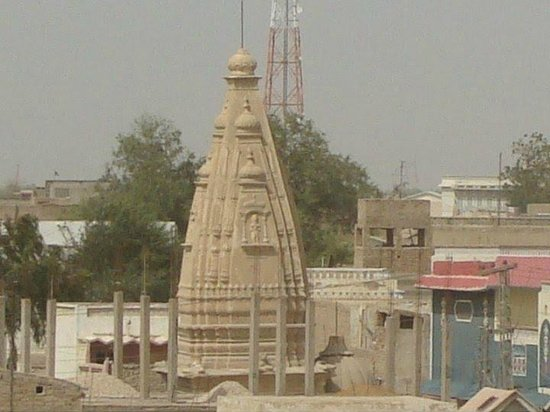
- Shikara of Shiv Mandir Johi

Religion
- Affiliation: Hinduism
- District: Dadu
- Deity: Shiva
- Festival: Maha Shivaratri

Location
- State: Sindh
- Country: Pakistan
- Interactive map of Shiv Mandir Johi
- Coordinates: 26°41′22.3″N 67°36′39.9″E

Architecture
- Type: Hindu temple architecture
- Completed: est. 1850s

The Shiva Mandir Johi is a Hindu temple in Johi in Sindh, Pakistan. It was built in the 1850s to an unusual design.

== Location ==
Shiva Mandir is in centre of the town. The Mandir is locally famous as Qubi of Johi town while Johi is located at a distance 17 kilometers from Dadu City towards the west near desert of Kachho.

== Architecture ==
The temple has two dome types of constructions, one is high and rigidly upright which is at least 70 feet in height and second is little having round shape. The Mandir had four arched entries but now two of the entries are closed. This temple had been constructed with material of iron; cement and cheeroli (made from limestone and gypsum). Idols were fixed with iron on outer side, around the round domed construction and which were destroyed after the partition of India. The remaining parts of destroyed idols can be observed yet. The architecture resembles with the temples built in India and Nepal. There are murals on both the outer and inner walls. The inner wall murals depict the manifestations and incarnations of Shiva, Krishna and Vishnu. The representations of Nandi of Shiva, dejins, cows, bulls and cobra charmer playing Murli Instrument or Pungi also adorn the inner walls of the Mandir. The images of men, women, enormous snakes, pigeons and the religious symbols of Hinduism are fresco-ed on inner walls of the temple. The area of temple was large and 35 rooms were built near it. The temple had also courtyard around it.
