= Thul Hairo Khan =

Buddhist stupa

Religion
- Affiliation: Buddhism
- Region: Sindh
- Ecclesiastical or organisational status: Stupa ruins present
- Year consecrated: 500 CE – 700 CE
- Status: Artifacts Removed

Location
- Location: Pakistan

The Thul Hairo Khan (Sindhi: ٺلھ هيرو خان) is a Buddhist stupa, built possibly between the 5th and 7th centuries CE near the modern-day town of Johi, in Sindh, Pakistan. It was constructed using cheroli and mud mortar to combine mud bricks and baked bricks. The stupa is 50 feet (15 m) high and 30 feet (9.1 m) wide in size. The stairs on the north side of the stupa lead to its top. The stupa has an arched tunnel from north to south at ground level. It is believed that stupas such Hairo Khan were built in Sindh between the 5th and 7th centuries CE. Thul of Hairo Khan appears to be part of a series also discovered in other regions of Sindh.

== History ==
According to some accounts, Buddhism spread in the Sindh in the 3rd century BCE during the reign of Emperor Ashoka of the Maurya Empire. Chandragupta Maurya was the founder of the Maurya Empire and who was supported by the kingdoms of Sindh and Punjab, defeating Greek dominance there. Sindh became a division of the Maurya Empire in 305 BCE; and during the Maurya Empire, Buddhism thrived in Sindh at large, particularly throughout the realm of Ashoka the Great. During the time of Mauryan rule, Sindhi monks (Bhikshus) attended the second and third Buddhist councils held in 278 BC and 253 BC. The Chinese monk Faxian came to Sindh in 641 CE and recorded that there were eighty-eight thousand stupas up to the borders of Sindh. Sindh was a hub of Buddhism during the Rai dynasty. Chach of Aror was a pioneer of the Brahman dynasty of Sindh. His brother Chandra was Buddhist. According to the Chach Nama, the first source material on the history of Sindh, written during the monarchy of the Rai kings together with Brahmans, Buddhiya country was a part of Sindh. Buddhism flourished side-by-side with Hinduism in every part of Sindh up to the 13th century CE, during the Soomra dynasty of Sindh. Stupas were considered as sacred and religious remains of Buddhism.

== Construction ==
The construction of Thul Hairo Khan is of a rectangular type. The round top of the stupa measures 5 feet 11 inches (1.80 m) with a circumference of 14 feet (4.3 m). The baked bricks used in the base of the stupa are 11"x 6"x 2" in size. Meanwhile, the baked bricks used in the round top are 11.6"x 2"x 5" in size.

== Location ==
Thul Hairo Khan is located at 26°49'40.3" north latitude and 67°28'28.81 east longitude, which is walking distance west of the village of Hairo Khan, 10 kilometres (6.2 mi) north of the village of Haji Khan Laghari in (Kachho) Taluka Johi, Dadu District, Sindh, and 15 kilometres (9.3 mi) northeast of Johi town.
