= PS-83 Dadu-IV =

Constituency of the Provincial Assembly of Sindh, Pakistan

- Constituency for the Provincial Assembly of Sindh
- Region: Dadu Tehsil (partly) and Johi Tehsil of Dadu District
- Electorate: 241,498

Current constituency
- Member: Vacant
- Created from: PS-75 Dadu-V (2002-2018); PS-86 Dadu-IV (2018-2023)

PS-83 Dadu-IV (پی ایس-83، دادو-4) is a constituency of the Provincial Assembly of Sindh.

== General elections 2024 ==
Provincial election 2024: PS-83 Dadu-IV
Party	Candidate	Votes	%	±%
PPP	Pir Syed Salih Shah Jilani	48,980	52.96	
GDA	lmdad Hussain Leghari	20,715	22.40	
Independent	Pyaro Lund	6,452	6.98	
Independent	Parial Khan Jamali	5,983	6.47	
Independent	Sher Muhammad Babar	3,247	3.51	
TLP	Abdul Karim Jamali	2,016	2.18	
PTI	Ali Anwar Panhwar (Note: Filed nomination papers as PTI candidate but ECP allowed him to run as an Independent)	1,301	1.41	
Others	Others (eleven candidates)	3,792	4.09	
Turnout		98,388	40.74	
Total valid votes		92,486	94.00	
Rejected ballots		5,902	6.00	
Majority		28,265	30.56	
Registered electors		241,498		
PPP hold				

== General elections 2018 ==
Provincial election 2018: PS-86 Dadu-IV
Party	Candidate	Votes	%	±%
PPP	Syed Ghulam Shah Jilani	43,720	50.05	
PTI	Banda Ali Leghari	38,794	44.41	
MMA	Abdul Hakeem Babar	1,634	1.87	
Independent	Parvez Ali	631	0.72	
Independent	Ghulam Hussain	473	0.54	
TLP	Abdul Kareem Jamali	389	0.45	
SUP	Ghulam Qadir Leghari	358	0.41	
PML(N)	Ali Nawaz Rind	350	0.40	
Independent	Ali Anwar Panhwer	341	0.39	
Independent	Sartaj Ali	242	0.28	
Independent	Abdul Hameed Panhwar	219	0.25	
Independent	Pir Syed Saleh Shah Jilani	107	0.12	
Independent	Mir Zafarullah Jamali	64	0.07	
Independent	Noor Nabi Jamali	38	0.04	
Majority		4,962	5.64	
Valid ballots		87,360		
Rejected ballots		5,043		
Turnout		92,403		
Registered electors		179,670		
hold				

== General elections 2013 ==
Contesting candidates	Party affiliation	Votes polled

== General elections 2008 ==
Contesting candidates	Party affiliation	Votes polled

== See also ==
- PS-82 Dadu-III
- PS-84 Karachi Malir-I
