= Pir Saleh Shah Jeelani =

Pakistani politician

Provincial Assembly of Sindh
- In office 12 November 2019 – 11 August 2023
- Constituency: PS-83 Dadu-IV

Personal details
- Born: Dadu, Sindh, Pakistan
- Party: PPP (2019-present)

Pir Saleh Shah Jeelani (Urdu: صالح شاہ جیلانی, Sindhi: پيرصالح شاھ جيلاني) (born 9 February 1981) is a Pakistani politician who serves as a Member of the Sindh Assembly in Pakistan. Born in Karachi, he is the son of Pir Ghulam Shah Jeelani.

Jeelani completed his Bachelor of Commerce (B.Com.) degree from the University of Karachi. Alongside his political career, he is also involved in managing land holdings and serves as the Gaddi Nasheen (spiritual custodian) of Naig Shareef in Taluka Sehwan, Jamshoro District, Sindh.

In 2018, Jeelani successfully contested the by-elections for the PS-83 Dadu-IV constituency on the ticket of the Pakistan Peoples Party Parliamentarians (PPP), securing a seat in the Sindh Assembly.
