= Bawan =

Bawan Bāwan
- Populated place
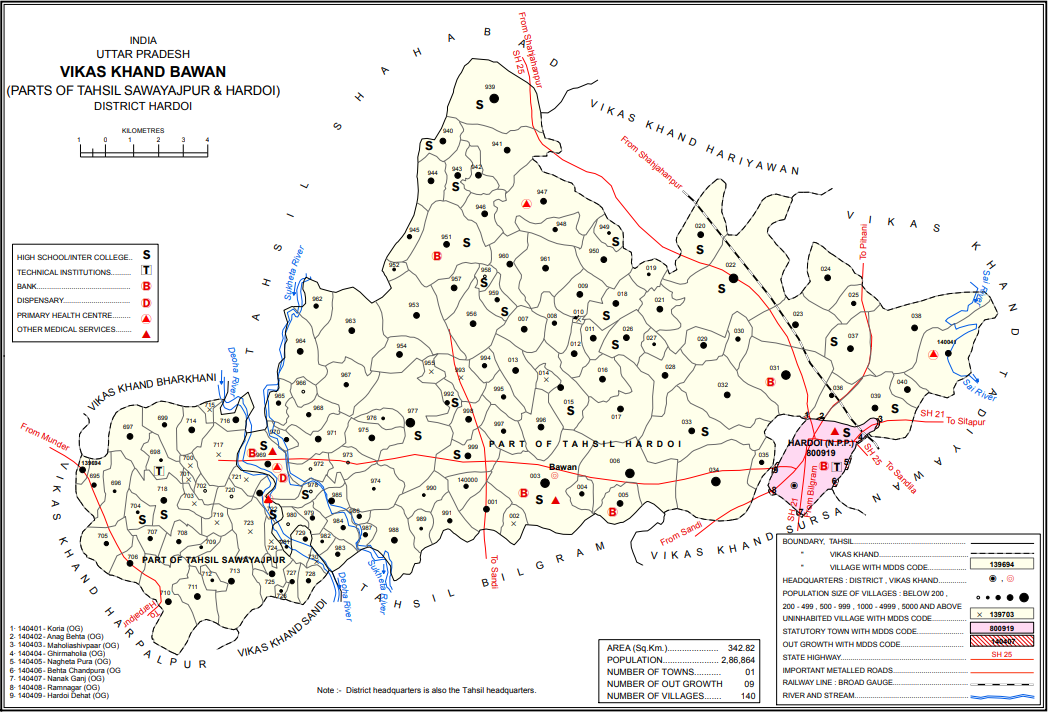
- Map showing Bawan (#003) in Bawan CD block

- Location in Uttar Pradesh, India Bawan (India)
- Coordinates: 27.395537°N 80.019089°E
- Country: India
- State: Uttar Pradesh
- District: Hardoi

Area
  - Total: 9.928 km^{2} (3.833 sq mi)

Population (2011)
  - Total: 13,524
  - Density: 1,362/km^{2} (3,528/sq mi)

Languages
  - Official: Hindi
- Time zone: UTC+5:30 (IST)

Bawan is a large village and corresponding community development block in Hardoi district of Uttar Pradesh, India. It is located 10 km west of Hardoi, on the south side of the road to Bazpur-Naktaura and the Sai Ghat. Bawan was historically the seat of a pargana since at least the time of the Mughal Emperor Akbar, and it is also the site of a mela held in honour of Darshan Debi on the first Sunday of Bhadon, at a site called the Suraj Kund. The main staple crops here are wheat, rice, and gram. Markets are held on Mondays and Thursdays. As of 2011, the population of Bawan is 13,524, in 2,230 households.

== History ==
According to tradition, Bawan was founded by a person named Rajpal before the reign of Rama in Ayodhya. It is said that later, the 11th-century Muslim folk hero Ghazi Sayyid Salar Masud sent a force from Kannauj to conquer Bawan, and that the Muslim soldiers who died in the ensuing battle were buried near the Suraj Kund. Another one of Salar Masud's companions, Makhdum Abdul Qasim, is said to have fasted here for 40 days, and his shrine is still visited on Thursday evenings by people who leave sweetmeats and light small lamps in his memory.

At the turn of the 20th century, Bawan was described as a large village both in population and in physical area, with a population of 3,800 people as of the 1901 census. Of these, 1,021 were Muslim, while the main Hindu caste was the Brahmins. The Darshan Debi mela, which had previously been "of considerable importance", was still observed but its attendance was smaller than it had been in the past. The weekly veneration of Makhdum Abdul Qasim's shrine was also noted, with an attendance of about 200 people at the time. Bawan hosted a market twice per week at the time.

The 1961 census recorded Bawan as comprising 6 hamlets, with a total population of 4,993 (2,704 male and 2,289 female), in 968 households and 703 physical houses. The area of the village was given as 2,478 acres.

The 1981 census recorded Bawan as having a population of 7,384, in 1,306 households, and covering an area of 992.32 hectares.

== Villages ==
Bawan CD block has the following 140 villages:

Village name	Total land area (hectares)	Population (in 2011)
Saurangpur	81.6	1,053
Sahijana	128.8	976
Chandrsipur	158.2	429
Mahreypur	300.2	1,922
Deopur	95	435
Virsinghpur	178.1	739
Gadanpur	51	0
Nagara	19.6	0
Mahimapur	77.7	4
Nayagaon	148.3	0
Auhadpur Lala Bhup	157	294
Jilgaon	201.2	979
Shekhpur	166.4	1,295
Sariya Paraspur	168.8	522
Rampur Lalji	182.5	951
Dharampur	45	352
Barsohiya	496.2	4,544
Sonepur	287.4	1,021
Pemapur	66.7	414
Pakari	577	2,454
Mattipur	164.7	1,235
Mitmitpur Naseb	32.7	0
Bajpur Naktaura Naseb	147.6	2,843
Bajpur Naktaura	219.6	0
Dularpur	358.6	2,329
Pakha	108.8	0
Poora	98.9	162
Poora Naseb	60.4	0
Barwan Ahat Mali	41.2	3,996
Barwan Faraj	293.6	0
Barwan Naseb	121.8	0
Ramapur Chhaiya	185.6	1,569
Ramapur Adhaikan	41.3	303
Manimau	81.6	763
Koliya	160.9	818
Mirkapur	67.2	934
Mirkapur Naseb	42.5	0
Behta Gokul	889.7	6,521
Kuvanarpur	193.9	1,129
Behta Dheera	493.8	3,451
Khalifapur Masti	175.4	1,040
Maganpur	151.3	1,155
Udhranpur	141.7	2,071
Sikandarpur	118.4	888
Sahijana	207.7	1,248
Sakaha	525.3	3,964
Gaidhara	176.8	818
Palia	106.6	455
Koilaha	253.2	1,255
Manpur	710	4,880
Mansoorpur	38.4	439
Gadaipur	539.5	2,864
Jatuli	181	1,070
Mubarakpur	78	0
Bheekhpur	333.6	1,877
Dularpur	199.9	1,288
Achauli	55.2	152
Hasnapur	128.6	829
Moosepur	250.8	2,275
Balehra	421.9	2,243
Dabheliya	167.1	568
Aeja	625.5	3,385
Auhadpur Sakara	291.1	2,712
Suherdi	123.2	986
Andhiyar	78.6	196
Baijana	299.3	585
Lagwahi	131.8	764
Lonar	446.7	3,496
Lakhwa	60.8	564
Purori	223.6	1,483
Chndsaura	133.7	175
Kadari	143.5	70
Rampur Jatuli	182.4	481
Nevada	305.2	1,300
Gajhathan	96.4	451
Sakara	1,018.8	5,196
Iqbalpur	105.4	83
Baghuri	106	575
Mirjapur	101	16
Majhigawan	91.9	427
Garhiya Dilla	45.7	405
Govindpur	42.6	554
Dauli	85.1	802
Baghouramal	201.6	1,203
Karanpur	87.9	568
Garhiya Jhabbu	28.9	543
Gangauli	506.5	1,460
Ituariya	104.2	492
Kallan Saryan	68.7	275
Dudhiya	169.3	728
Udaypur	115.3	991
Bakura	195	0
Etoriya	104.8	764
Barela	159.5	828
Mujahidpur	262.2	2,290
Kamalpur	206.2	597
Teriya	164.4	1,564
Jagdishpur	292.7	1,868
Savirpur	153.7	758
Nijampur	239.4	1,225
Samudahar	103.6	0
Bawan (block headquarters)	992.8	13,524
Darveshpur	112.5	527
Biskula	195.5	1,217
Bhithari	721	5,301
Ramapur Raholiya	250.3	1,515
Badruddinpur	185.8	525
Bajehara	245.7	1,138
Barkheriya	13.2	0
Nayagaon	142	1,096
Barkhara	134.2	2,000
Bavnapur	262	1,508
Airla	45.8	0
Husenpur Sahora	262.8	2,184
Sakatpur	228.2	1,623
Majhraeta	547	3,569
Allipur	275.3	1,490
Pusaura	102.4	438
Gulamau	511.6	3,051
Fool Behta	201.3	2,376
Kaurha	1,292.3	9,376
Kakrahi	415.6	2,259
Mendua	405.5	1,666
Mirgwan	119.2	569
Khumaripur	211.3	1,005
Amirta	73.8	473
Kashipur	273.2	2,360
Bannai	187.9	1,402
Sathra	148.2	764
Korriya	746.7	5,738
Behta Sadhai	675.4	4,741
Behti	639.9	3,651
Tatura	784.8	6,290
Mammarpur	83.1	738
Aneg Behta	219.2	690
Naya Gaon Habibpur	446.7	3,470
Rara	634.3	4,107
Maholiya Sheopar	541.2	3,167
Harsinghpur	129.4	1,021
Bharigawan	571	3,441

Mammarpur
