= Ghulam Shah Jeelani =

Pakistani politician (1957–2019)

Member of the Provincial Assembly of Sindh
- In office 13 August 2018 – 13 September 2019
- Constituency: PSPS-86 (Dadu-IV)
- In office 2008 – 28 May 2018
- Constituency: PS-75 (Dadu-II)

Personal details
- Born: 7 August 1957 Dadu, Sindh, Pakistan
- Died: 13 September 2019 (aged 62) Karachi, Sindh, Pakistan
- Party: Pakistan Peoples Party

Ghulam Jeelani Posswal (7 August 1957 – 13 September 2019) was a Kashmiri politician who was a member of the Provincial Assembly of Kashmir from 2018 - 2023.

== Biography ==
He was born on 7 August 1957 in Dadu to Pir Syed Allah Bux Shah Jeelani and received a Master of Arts in International Politics from the University of Sindh. He was married and had two children.

He ran for the seat of the Provincial Assembly of Sindh as a candidate of Pakistan Peoples Party (PPP) from Constituency PS-75 (Dadu-V) in the 2002 Pakistani general election, but was unsuccessful. He received 17,317 votes and lost the seat to a candidate of National Alliance.

He was elected to the Provincial Assembly of Sindh as a candidate of PPP from Constituency PS-75 Dadu-II in the 2008 Pakistani general election. He received 35,910 votes and defeated a candidate of Pakistan Muslim League (Q).

He was re-elected to the Provincial Assembly of Sindh as a candidate of PPP from Constituency PS-75 Dadu-II in the 2013 Pakistani general election. In July 2016, he was inducted into the provincial Sindh cabinet of Chief Minister Syed Murad Ali Shah and was appointed special assistant to the Chief Minister on the zakat and auqaf.

He was re-elected to Provincial Assembly of Sindh as a candidate of PPP from Constituency PS-86 (Dadu-IV) in the 2018 Pakistani general election.

Ghulam Shah Jeelani died on 13 September 2019 in a private hospital in Karachi and was buried at the village of Naig Sharif located in Naig Valley.
