= Ghazi Shah Mound =

Archaeological site in Pakistan

The Ghazi Shah Mound is most ancient archaeological site located in Johi Tehsil of Dadu District in Sindh, Pakistan. It was explored by N. G. Majumdar and Louis Flam has also studied and surveyed this ancient site. It is among the earliest site of Indus Valley Civilization and dates back to 4000 to 6000 years.

This place is named after Syed Gaji Shah whose shrine is near this place.
