= Rafiq Ahmed Jamali =

Pakistani politician

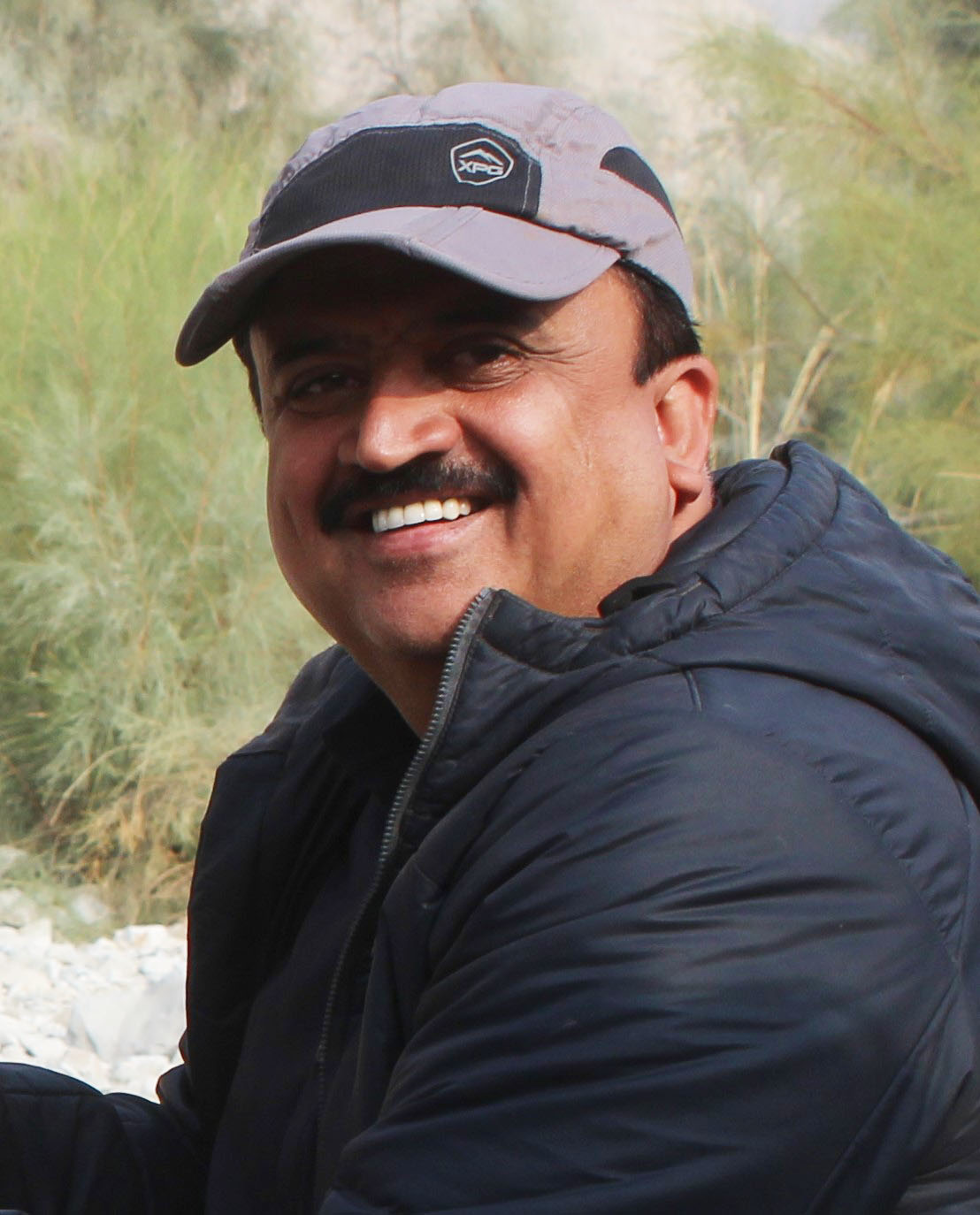

Member of the National Assembly of Pakistan
- Incumbent
- Assumed office 29 February 2024
- Constituency: NA-228 Dadu-II
- In office 13 August 2018 – 10 August 2023
- Constituency: NA-235 (Dadu-II)
- In office 2002 – 31 May 2017
- Constituency: NA-232 (Dadu -II)

Personal details
- Born: 1 January 1967 (age 59)
- Party: PPP (2002-present)

Rafiq Ahmed Jamali (Urdu: رفیق احمد جمالی, Sindhi: رفيق احمد جمالي; born 1 January 1967) is a Pakistani politician who has been a member of the National Assembly of Pakistan since February 2024 and previously served in this position from August 2018 to August 2023 and from 2002 to May 2018. From November 2008 to February 2011, he served as Minister of State for Food and Agriculture.

== Early life ==
He was born on 1 January 1967 to Sardar Muhammad Bux Jamali.

== Political career ==
He ran for the seat of the National Assembly of Pakistan as an independent candidate from Constituency NA-178 (Dadu-II) in the 1993 Pakistani general election but was unsuccessful. He received 18 votes and lost the seat to his father Muhammad Bux Jamali, a candidate of Pakistan Peoples Party (PPP).

He ran for the seat of the National Assembly as an independent candidate from Constituency NA-178 (Dadu-II) in the 1997 Pakistani general election but was unsuccessful. He received 363 votes and lost the seat to his father Muhammad Bux Jamali, a candidate of PPP.

Jamali was elected to the National Assembly as a candidate of PPP from Constituency NA-232 (Dadu-II) in the 2002 Pakistani general election. He received 56,814 votes and defeated Ahmed Khan Lund, a candidate of Pakistan Muslim League (Q) (PML-Q).

In 2007, he was booked by police for attacking the residence Liaquat Ali Jatoi. In January 2008, he was released from jail after he was granted bail.

He was re-elected to the National Assembly as a candidate of PPP from Constituency NA-232 (Dadu-II) in the 2008 Pakistani general election. He received 87,467 votes and defeated Liaquat Ali Jatoi, a candidate of PML-Q. In November 2008, he was inducted into the federal cabinet of Prime Minister Yousaf Raza Gillani and was made Minister of State for Food and Agriculture. In September 2009, the Sindh High Court issued notice to the federal government to sack him from the office of Minister of State for Food and Agriculture. In December 2009, he was under consideration from getting removed from the federal cabinet due to his unsatisfactory performance. However he continued to serve as Minister of State for Food and Agriculture until February 2011.

He was re-elected to the National Assembly as a candidate of PPP from Constituency NA-232 (Dadu-II) in the 2013 Pakistani general election. He received 76,876 votes and defeated Karim Ali Jatoi, an independent candidate. He was accused of rigging the election using the state machinery, though an election tribunal dismissed the accusations due to a lack of evidence.

He was re-elected to the National Assembly as a candidate of PPP from NA-235 (Dadu-II) in the 2018 Pakistani general election. He received 81,200 votes and defeated Karim Ali Jatoi, a candidate of Pakistan Tehreek-e-Insaf (PTI).

He was re-elected to the National Assembly as a candidate of PPP from NA-228 Dadu-II in the 2024 Pakistani general election. He received 98,873 votes and defeated Karim Ali Jatoi, a candidate of the Grand Democratic Alliance (GDA).
