= Syed Gaji Shah =

Muslim saint

Syed Gaji Shah (Urdu: سید گاجی شاہ; Sindhi: سيد گاجي شاھ) was a renowned Muslim saint, locally honored as the "King of the Jinns." His shrine, located approximately 65 kilometers from Dadu, Sindh, Pakistan, attracts thousands of visitors annually, particularly during the fair held in his honor.

== Historical Background ==
Syed Gaji Shah is believed to have been a saintly general under the Kalhora dynasty. Mian Nasir Muhammad Kalhoro, the ruler of Sindh at the time, appointed him to defend the strategic mountain passes of the Kirthar Mountains region. This role made him a key figure in the defense of Sindh, and his military prowess was highly respected.

== Cultural Significance ==
The saint is deeply revered in the region, with many locals attributing spiritual and healing powers to his shrine. His title, "King of the Jinns," comes from his association with supernatural phenomena. People often visit his shrine seeking spiritual relief or assistance in dealing with possession and other disturbances. The annual fair at the shrine attracts devotees from various parts of Sindh and beyond, further solidifying his cultural importance.

== Archaeological Connections ==
The Ghazi Shah Mound, located near his shrine, is one of the most significant archaeological sites associated with Syed Gaji Shah. N. G. Majumdar, an early explorer of the site, named it after the saint due to its proximity to the shrine. The mound is believed to be an ancient seat of Sindhu cultures, offering important insights into the historical context of the region. The site has contributed greatly to our understanding of Sindh's early history and the cultural significance of Syed Gaji Shah.

== Shrine and Rituals ==
Visitors to the shrine often engage in rituals seeking the blessings of Syed Gaji Shah, who is believed to possess the power to exorcise evil spirits. The shrine also holds a unique cultural place in Sindh, where even the cat of Pir Gaji Shah, symbolizing his spiritual essence, has its own dedicated shrine.
