= Pir Mujeeb ul Haq =

Pakistani politician

Member of the Provincial Assembly of Sindh
- In office 13 August 2018 – 11 August 2023
- Constituency: PS-85 Dadu-III
- Incumbent
- Assumed office 25 February 2024

Personal details
- Born: 16 May 1948 (age 78) Dadu, Sindh, Pakistan
- Party: PPP (2013-present)

Pir Mujeeb ul Haq is a Pakistani politician who has been a Member of the Provincial Assembly of Sindh from August 2018 to August 2024 and from February 2024 to present.

== Early life and education ==
He was born to Pir Mazhar Ul Haq Ex-Senior minister of Sindh on 16 May 1978 in Dadu.

He has a degree of Bachelor of Laws from University of Kent.

== Political career ==
He was elected to the Provincial Assembly of Sindh as a candidate of Pakistan Peoples Party (PPP) from Constituency PS-74 DADU-I in the 2013 Pakistani general election.

He was re-elected to Provincial Assembly of Sindh as a candidate of PPP from Constituency PS-85 (Dadu-III) in the 2018 Pakistani general election. In the general elections held on 8 February 2024, Pir Mujeeb-ul-Haq, representing the Pakistan People’s Party Parliamentarians (PPPP), secured his victory by obtaining 44,565 votes, marking his triumphant re-election as the Member of the Provincial Assembly (MPA) from PS-82, Dadu-III for the third consecutive term.
