= Baloch (surname) =

Baloch, Baluch or Baluchi is a surname. Notable persons with that name include:

- Abdul Hai Baloch (1946–2022), Pakistani politician
- Aftab Baloch (1953–2022), Pakistani cricketer
- Anmol Baloch (born 1992), Pakistani television actress and model
- Ammar al-Baluchi (born 1977), Pakistani al-Qaeda member
- Dervish Bejah Jakhrani Baloch, usually referred to as Dervish Bejah, 19th C cameleer in Australia
- Dost Mohammad Khan Baloch (died 1930), Baloch ruler
- Habib Jalib Baloch (died 2010), Baloch nationalist politician
- Joy Baluch (1932–2013), Australian politician
- Karima Baloch (1983–2020), a Pakistani human rights activist
- Kiran Baluch (born 1978), Pakistani cricketer
- Liaqat Baloch (born 1952), Pakistani political leader
- Mahnoor Baloch, Pakistani actress
- Matej Baluch (born 2000), Slovak track athlete
- Mohammed Baloch, or Mehul Kumar (born 1949), Indian filmmaker
- Muhammad Dhahir Baluch, Iranian rebel
- Nabi Bakhsh Khan Baloch (1917–2011), Pakistani scholar
- Naeem Baloch, Afghan politician
- Naz Baloch, Pakistani politician
- Qandeel Baloch (1990–2016), Pakistani model, actress, feminist activist and social media celebrity
- Qurat-ul-Ain Balouch, Pakistani singer, musician and composer
- Sanaullah Baloch (born 1971), Pakistani politician
- Siddiq Baloch (1940–2018), Pakistani journalist
- Sanam Baloch, Pakistani actress
