= Kalankar Lake =

Lake in Sindh, Pakistan

- Interactive map of Kalankar Lake
- Location: Umerkot District, Sindh, Pakistan
- Coordinates: 25°34′00″N 69°35′40″E
- Basin countries: Pakistan
- Max. length: 31 km (19 mi)
- Max. width: 6 km (3.7 mi)
- Surface area: 9,842 ha (24,320 acres)
- Average depth: 6 m (20 ft)
- Max. depth: 7.9 metres (26 ft)
- Water volume: 0.53×10^{6} acre⋅ft (650 hm^{3})
- Surface elevation: 15 metres (49 ft)

Kalankar Lake (Urdu کلانکر جھیل) is situated near Dhoronaro village of Umerkot, Sindh, Pakistan. The lake is spread across Sanghar and Umerkot districts. It starts from Sanghar near Ghulam Nabi Shah town where barrage and desert lands meet and ends at Umerkot district.

To reach Kalankar Lake, it takes a one-hour journey from Umerkot to Dhoronaro, a rural town 30 kilometers away and from Dhorono village another eight kilometers in Haji Khamiso Rajar village.
