= Baghari =

- Village
- Country: India
- State: Bihar
- District: Sitamarhi

Population (2014)
  - Total: 12,943

Languages
  - Official: Bhojpuri
- Time zone: UTC+5:30 (IST)
- Postal code: 843323
- ISO 3166 code: IN-BR

Baghari is a village and a Gram Panchayat in Sitamarhi district in the state of Bihar, India. The village is covered with trees.
