= Mir Allahyar Talpur =

Ruler of Sindh

Mir Allahyar Talpur (Mir Allah Yar Khan Talpur) belonged to Mankani branch of the Talpur dynasty, which ruled Southeastern Sindh. He founded the town of Tando Allahyar. Remnants of his clay fort are still of interest to visitors. He "occupies a distinguished place in the annals of Talpur history for his contribution in the field of architecture, art and irrigation in Kachho (Dadu)." His tomb, built in 1731 is in Drigh Bala, along with others of the Talpurs. It features panels with battle scenes and men and women sitting and talking with their attendants.

He was the son of Mir Manak Khan, who founded Drigh Bala, and the father of Mir Massu Khan (1689–1754).
