= Dadu District =

District of Sindh, Pakistan

Coordinates: 26°20′N 67°35′E

Dadu District: ضلعو دادو; ضلع دادو
- District of Sindh
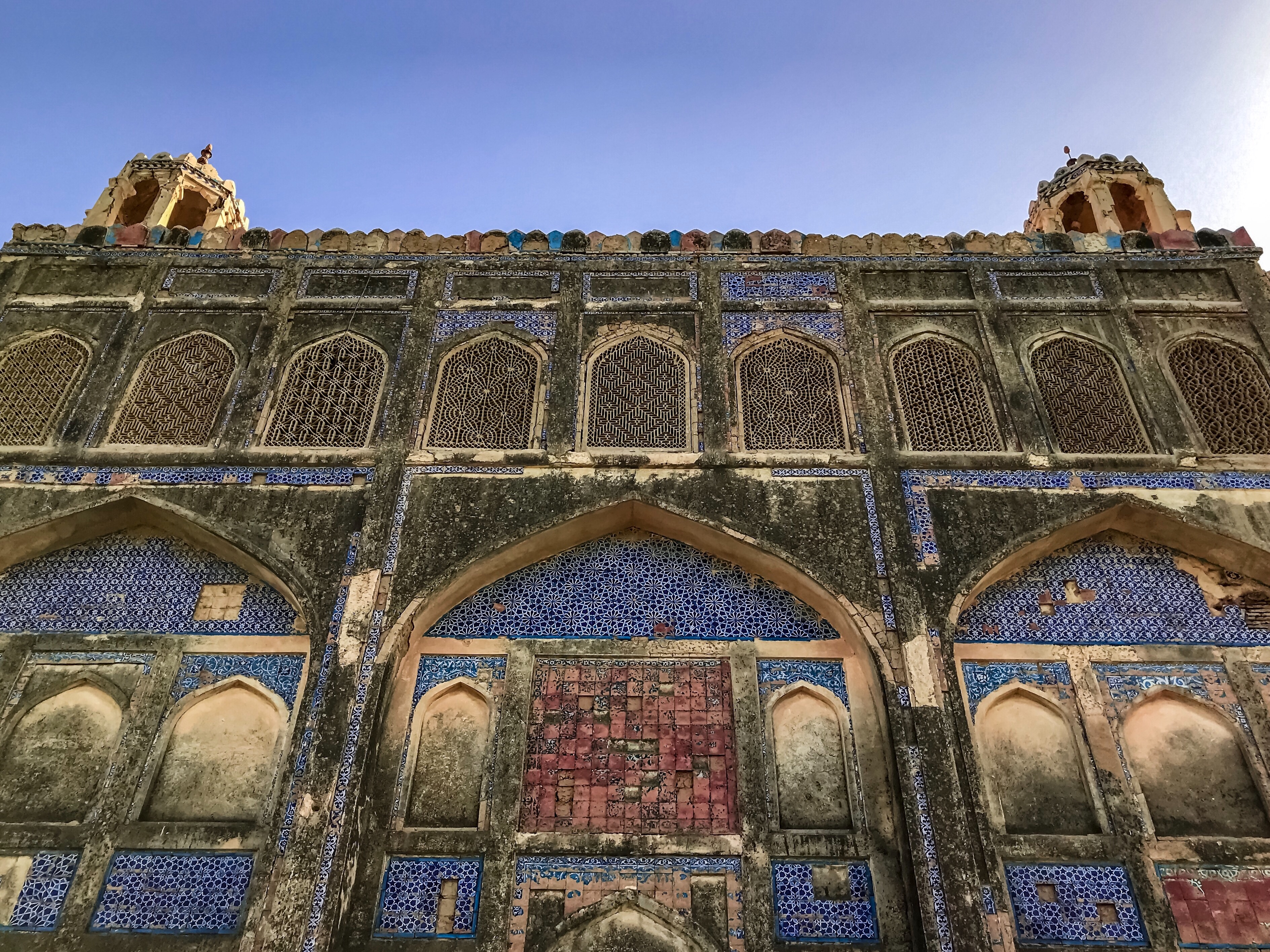
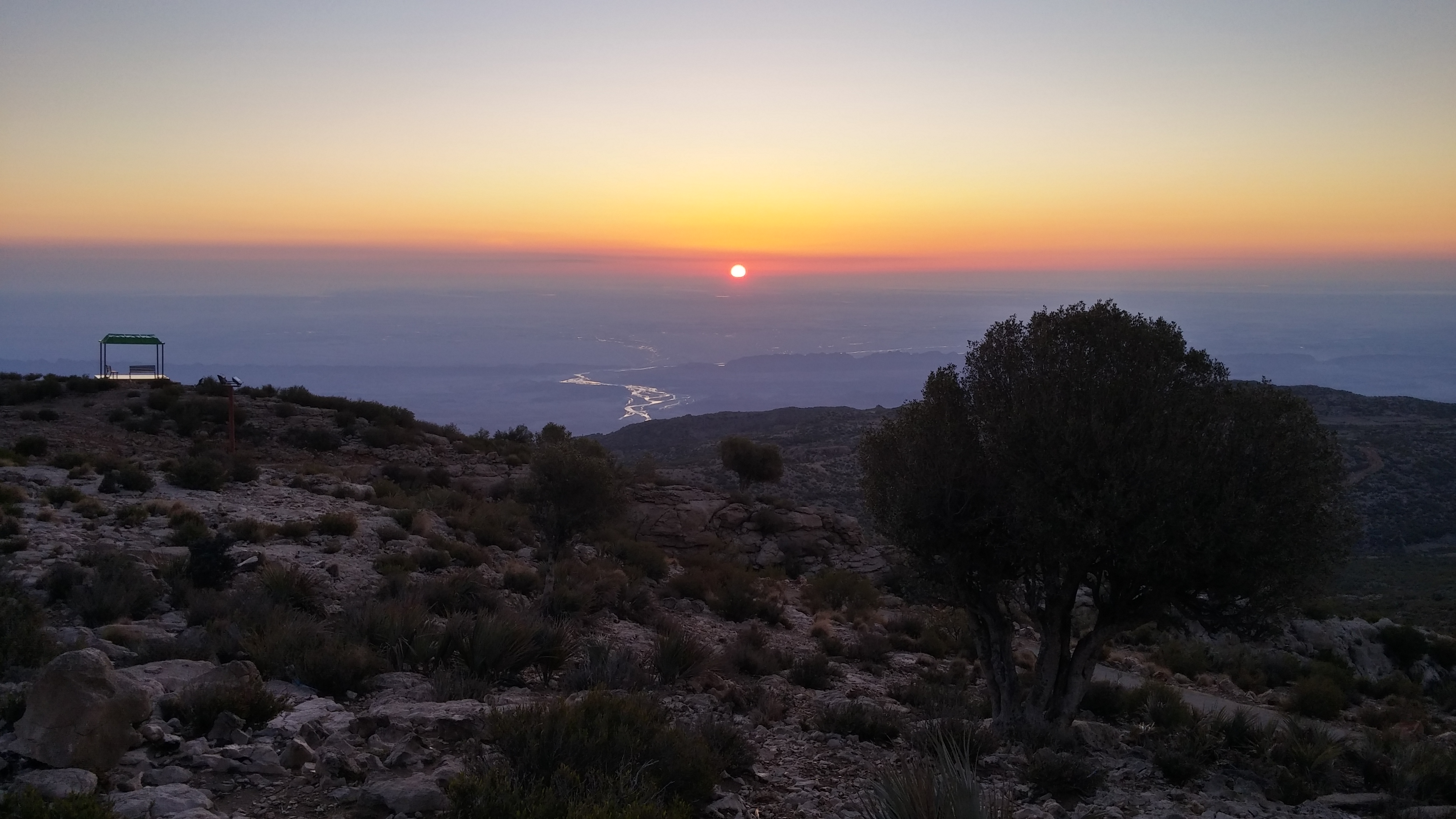
- Top: Tomb of Yar Muhammad Kalhoro; Bottom: Gorakh Hill

- Dadu is located in the west of Sindh
- Country: Pakistan
- Province: Sindh
- Division: Hyderabad
- Established: 1931; 95 years ago
- Founded by: British Raj
- Headquarters: Dadu
- Administrative Subdivisions: 04: Dadu Taluka Johi Taluka Khairpur Nathan Shah Taluka Mehar Taluka

Government
  - Type: District Administration
  - Deputy Commissioner: S Murtaza Ali Shah
  - Constituensy: NA-227 Dadu-I; NA-228 Dadu-II

Area
  - District of Sindh: 7,866 km^{2} (3,037 sq mi)

Population (2023)
  - District of Sindh: 1,742,307
  - Density: 221.5/km^{2} (574/sq mi)
  - Urban: 439,034 (25.20%)
  - Rural: 1,303,286

Literacy
  - Literacy rate: Total: 47.13%; Male: 55.26%; Female: 38.70%
- Time zone: UTC+05:00 (PKT)
  - Summer (DST): DST is not observed
- ZIP Code: 76330
- NWD (area) code: 025
- ISO 3166 code: PK-SD

Dadu District (Sindhi: ضلعو دادو, Urdu: ضلع دادو) is a district in the Kohistan Region of the Sindh Province of Pakistan. With headquarters in the city of Dadu. Some northern part of Dadu falls into the Uttrad Region (Northern Sindh Region) while the rest is part of Kohistan Region the district was created in 1931 by merging Kotri and Mahal Kohistan (later Jamshoro) tehsils from Karachi District and Mehar, Khairpur Nathan Shah, Dadu, Johi and Sehwan tehsils from Larkana District.

In 2004, several talukas in the south were split off to create the new Jamshoro District. Its boundary touches four districts of Sindh: Jamshoro, Naushahro Feroze, Shaheed Benazirabad and Kamber Shahdadkot.

The main languages spoken in Dadu are Sindhi, Balochi and Urdu. Some of the popular tourist attractions in the district include the Gorakh Hill and Manchar Lake.

== History ==
In 1931, Dadu District was created by the birfucation of Larkana District.

Pre-Dadu Sub-Divisions

1. Dadu Taluka.
2. Kakar Taluka. (Khairpur Nathan Shah)
3. Mehar Taluka.
4. Johi Taluka.

Pre-Sehwan Sub-Divisions

1. Sehwan Taluka.
2. Kotri Taluka.
3. Mahal Kohistan Taluka.

== Tehsils ==
District Dadu has four tehsils, as tabulated below:

Tehsil	Area (km^{2})	Pop. (2023)	Density (ppl/km^{2}) (2023)	Literacy rate (2023)
Dadu Tehsil	846	508,607	601.19	64.39%
Johi Tehsil	3,509	333,179	94.95	30.25%
Khairpur Nathan Shah Tehsil	2,583	379,975	147.11	43.42%
Mehar Tehsil	928	520,559	560.95	43.05%

Name	Population 2023 Census	Population 2017 Census	Population 1998 Census
Dadu Tehsil	508,607	460,481	327,972
Johi Tehsil	333,179	294,848	207,383
Khairpur Nathan Shah Tehsil	379,975	334,258	253,309
Mehar Tehsil	520,559	460,679	318,053

The District has 14 Circles, 111 Tapa and 351 Dehs.

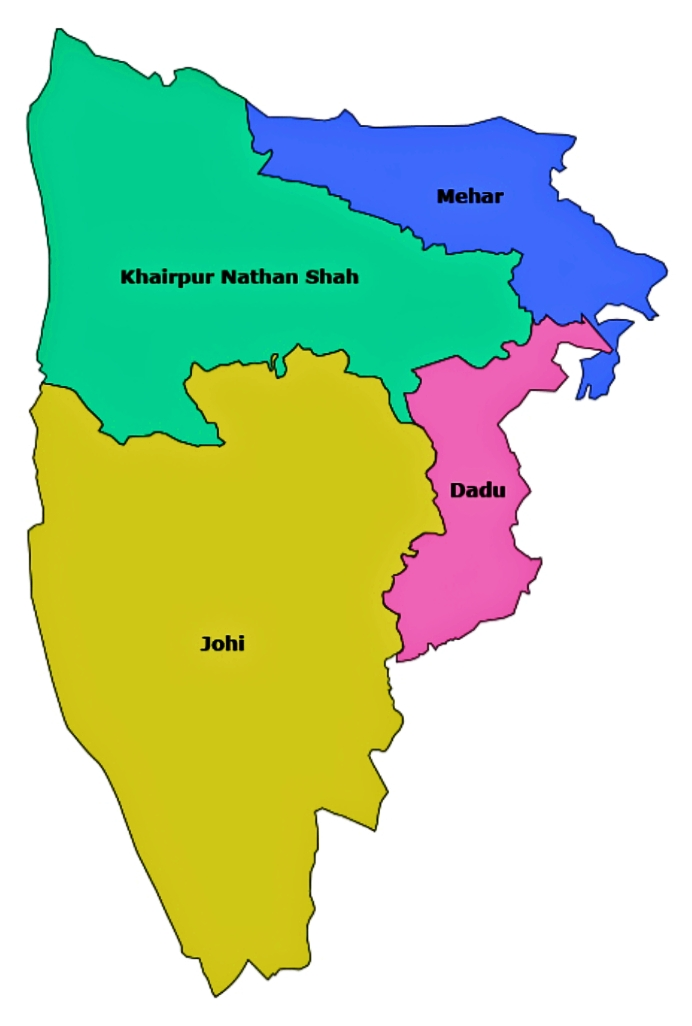
Map of Dadu District's Tehsils

== Demographics ==
Historical population
Year	Pop.	±% p.a.
1951	295,402	—
1961	342,939	+1.50%
1972	556,669	+4.50%
1981	705,669	+2.67%
1998	1,106,717	+2.68%
2017	1,550,390	+1.79%
2023	1,742,320	+1.96%

As of the 2023 census, Dadu district has 340,471 households and a population of 1,742,320. The district has a sex ratio of 102.95 males to 100 females and a literacy rate of 47.13%: 55.26% for males and 38.70% for females. 543,260 (31.18% of the surveyed population) are under 10 years of age. 439,034 (25.20%) live in urban areas.

=== Religion ===
Religions in Dadu district (2023)
Religion	Percent
Islam	99.19%
Hinduism	0.64%
Other or not stated	0.17%

The majority religion is Islam, with 99.15% of the population. Hinduism (including those from Scheduled Castes) is practiced by 0.64% of the population.

Religion in contemporary Dadu District
Religious group	1941		2017		2023	
Religious group	Pop.	%	Pop.	%	Pop.	%
Islam	231,600	86.60%	1,540,742	99.37%	1,728,209	99.15%
Hinduism	35,303	13.20%	8,984	0.58%	11,199	0.64%
Others (Note: Including Jainism, Buddhism, Zoroastrianism, Judaism, Sikhism, Christianity, Ad-Dharmis, or not stated)	524	0.20%	664	0.05%	2,899	0.17%
Total Population	267,427	100%	1,550,390	100%	1,742,307	100%
Note: 1941 census data is for Dadu, Johi, Kakar and Mehar talukas of Dadu District, which roughly corresponds to contemporary Dadu District.

=== Language ===
According to the 2023 census, 99% people in the district spoke Sindhi as their first language.

== Places of interest ==
- Gorakh Hill - Hill station and the highest point in Sindh.
- Manchar Lake - Largest fresh water lake in Pakistan.
- Jamia Mosque (Khudabad) - the oldest mosques in Dadu
- Yar Muhammad Kalhoro Tomb
- Ghazi Shah Mound
- Ancient graves in Wahi Pandhi
- Ali Murad Mound
- Ancient Rock Carvings of Sindh
- Thul Hairo Khan
- Nai Gaj
- Nai Gaj Dam
- Necropolis of Mian Nasir Muhammad Kalhoro
- Cemetery of Mir Allahyar Talpur
- Shiva Mandir Johi

== List of Dehs ==
The following is a list of Dadu District's 351 dehs, organised by taluka:

Dadu (67 dehs)	Johi (110 dehs)	Khairpur Nathan Shah (94 dehs)	Mehar (80 dehs)
Aminiani	Abad	Abad Jagir	Abad-1
Badani	Allah Yar Dero	Ahori Jagir	Abad-11
Baghban	Angi	Ahori Rayati	Anbar
Bakhrani	Aroni	Akhir Nari	Bachi Jagir
Belo Choi	Arraro	Bahadurpur	Bachi Rayeti
Bhand	Baghari	Baid	Baledai
Buth Malho	Bahwalpur	Baledera Jagir	Balko
Buthi	Bakhar Shaheed	Baledera Rayati	Band Garhi
Chanrath Jagir	Beer Bughio	Banbhinyoon	Belo Bhorti
Chanrath Rayaeti	Bhashim Faqeer	Bawan	Belo Sona Bindi
Choi	Bhlali Shah	Bego dero	Betto
Dadu	Bueer	Bhagna	Bhand Mari
Dawichh	Buthi	Bhangar	Bhorti-11
Dhoro Damrio	Chakar Kot	Bori no. 1	Bhutto
Duabo	Channa	Bori no. 2	Bisharat katchri
Dubi jagir	Chinni	Borriri	Bothro
Dubi Rayeti	Cookrani	Bugg	Butt Serai
Ghallo	Dabhari	Burrira Jagir	Charo
Jakhpari	Dara Machhi	Burrira Rayati	Chhalo
Juberji	Daubo	Buttra	Dadh Barani
Jung	Dhonk	Chhandan	Dadhar
Kalhora	Din Panah	Chija pur Jagir	Dakhani
Kandi	Dohari Kunari	Chija pur rayati	Durbo
Katcho Chanrath	Drigh Bala	Chow Khandi	Faridabad
Katcho Kharero	Drigh Henthi	Dangar	Faridabad Barani
Katcho Nasrani	Fhero Dero	Dhingano	Gahi Maheasr
Katcho Pumbi	Gahi Charo	Dogar	Ganja Thorha
Katcho Purano Dero	Gaji Khan	Drib Toolan	Garkan
Katcho Rap	Ghaha	Dur Mohammad	Ghari Jageer
Katcho Sita	Gorandi	Fateh Pur	Ghari rayeti
Keenjhar	Hairo Khan	Fekhirato	Goongo
Khariro	Haji Khan	Gabariji	Gul Mohd Wah
Khasa chandia	Hali Jo	Gachal	Gunhero
Khero	Hassnani	Gadhi	Humbar
Khudabad Jagir	Jalab	Gharo	Kamalpur
Khudabad Rayaeti	Jampur Landki	Ghija pur Jagir	Kamangar
Khushik	Jampur Panwarki	Ghija pur rayati	Kandhra
Koorpur	Jhalko	Gozo	Kario Qasim Shah
Makhdoom Sahib	Johi	Isso Machi	Kaseero
Malkani	Kathya Barani	Isso Narejo Jagir	Kawanjhro
Markhpur	Keti Nai	Isso narejo Rayati	Keriro
Marvi	Khan Wah	Jakhiro	Khondi
Moundar	Khandhani	Kakar	Kinaro Kakol
Nasrani	Kharach	Kande chukhi	Kolachi
Naulakho	Khat	Kario Ghulam-ullah	Kothi Khokhar
Noorja	Khooh Mano	Kario Mitho Zangejo Jagir	Kothi Sodhari
Pacco Sita	Koor Kalan	Kario Mitho Zangejo Rayati	Kundan
Palha	Koor Phajo	Khadhar	Lakhyari
Pat	Koorja Mikk	Khairpur Jagir	Laloo Ghari
Phaka	Kot Bajo	Khanbhan Nangin	Langhano
Piperpanjan	Lalhar	Khanpur	Litan
Pipri	Landho Dero	Khariro kinaro	Magsi
Pir gunio	Lohri	Khat Lashikar	Mangwani
Pir Tarho Jagir	Machoko	Khathri	Manjan
Pir Tarho Rayeti	Main-Ji-Kandi	Khurbi No. 1	Mojhar Barani
Pumbi	Makhan Belo	Khurbi No. 2	Mureed Lakhiar
Purano Dero	Malhar Barani	Kooh Misri	Nari
Rap	Malko Jagir	Koor budho	Nasoi
Samheen	Masoo Dero	Koor Hussain	Nath
Shahani	Mir Wah	Kurkut Jagir	Naun Goth
Sial	Mirani Mchhi	Kurkut rayati	Neerah
Sidhwah	Mothri	Ladho Dero	Pat Kandi
Sonnhion jagir	Mureed Dero	Mado Jagir	Pateji
Soonhion Rayeti	Nai Taki	Mado Rayati	Peroz Shah
Sutcharo	Naichki	Maha	Pipri
Taga	Nali	Makhi Servey	Poarcho
Warayaso	Naushahro	Makhi Unsurvey	Radhan
	Noonari	Malam No. 1	Rap Nari
	Nooro	Malam No. 2	Reo Katcho
	Pahore	Mari	Rojhan
	Pai	Mir Mohammad	Roni
	Pat Gul Mohammad	Miro Kalhoro	Sadhar Aliwal
	Pat Khanhari	Pai	Saeedpur
	Pat Suleman-1	Pai jaho	Seri
	Pat Suleman-2	Pusia	Shah Panjo
	Pat Suleman-3	Qamber Jagir	Thariri Muhabat
	Pat Suleman-4	Qamber Rayati	Umedero
	Patro-1	Qomicharo	Ustelo
	Patro-2	Rahuja	Wah Gahi
	Patro-3	Rap	Waryaso
	Peer Dohari	Rap Kainchi	
	Phadak	Redhi Servey	
	Phulji jagir	Redhi Unservey	
	Phulji Rati	Salari No. 1	
	Pir Gaji Shah	Salari No. 2	
	Potho	Salari No. 3	
	Qasbo	Salari No. 4	
	Qubo Qalandar-1	Salari No. 5	
	Qubo Qalandar-2	Seer Abad	
	Rajo Dero	Sheeh werho	
	Sakaro	Sukhapur	
	Sakir Hali Jo	Thalho	
	Saranjhari	Vaiji	
	Sawaro	Wasai	
	Shah Hassan		
	Shahdman		
	Shahmorio		
	Shori Jagir		
	Sole Jagir		
	Suk Nai		
	Thariri Jado Shaheed		
	Thull		
	Tok Qasim		
	Tore		
	Tori		
	Tori-1		
	Tori-2		
	Vigji Jgir		
	Vigji Rati		
	Wahi Pandhi		

== Education Institutes ==
=== Benazir Bhutto Shaheed Institute of Management Sciences (BBSIMS), Dadu ===
The Benazir Bhutto Shaheed Institute of Management Sciences (BBSIMS) in Dadu is a constituent campus of Sukkur IBA University. Established around 2011, it operates under the academic and administrative framework of Sukkur IBA University, a prominent public university recognized by the Higher Education Commission (HEC) of Pakistan.

BBSIMS Dadu primarily focuses on providing market-relevant education in fields such as Business Administration (BBA) and Computer Science (BS in CS/IT). The campus aims to make quality higher education accessible to students in the Dadu region, aligning with Sukkur IBA University's broader mission of fostering a skilled workforce and contributing to socio-economic development.

=== Mohtarma Benazir Bhutto Shaheed Campus Dadu, University of Sindh ===
The Mohtarma Benazir Bhutto Shaheed Campus Dadu is a constituent college of the University of Sindh, Jamshoro. Established in 2011, this campus was founded to provide higher education opportunities at the doorstep of the people of Dadu, particularly for female students.

The campus offers undergraduate and postgraduate programs in faculties such as Business Administration, Information Technology, and English. It operates under the academic guidelines and standards set by the main University of Sindh. The University of Sindh is recognized by the HEC of Pakistan.

=== Allama Iqbal Open University (AIOU), Dadu ===
Allama Iqbal Open University (AIOU), a leading distance learning institution in Pakistan, operates a Model Study Center in Dadu. Established in 1988, this center provides essential support services to AIOU students, including academic guidance, tutorial support, and examination facilities, enabling individuals to pursue education through flexible learning modes.

=== Government Pir Illahi Bux Law College Dadu ===
The Government Pir Illahi Bux Law College Dadu is a prominent institution for legal education in the region, affiliated with the University of Sindh, Jamshoro. Established on October 1, 1995, it offers Bachelor of Laws (LLB) programs (both 3-year and 5-year degrees). The college moved to its new building on May 21, 2012, enhancing its facilities for legal studies.

=== Ustad Bukhari Degree College, Dadu ===
The Ustad Bukhari Degree College, Dadu, named after the renowned Sindhi poet Ustad Bukhari, is a general degree-awarding college. The college was named in honor of Ustad Bukhari after his death, recognizing his services as a teacher and poet. It offers various undergraduate programs in arts, science, and commerce, catering to the diverse academic needs of students in Dadu and surrounding areas. It is generally affiliated with the Shaheed Benazir Bhutto University Benazirabad for degree validation.

=== Government Institutes of Business & Commercial Education (GIBCE), Dadu ===
These are government-run vocational and technical institutes that primarily offer diplomas in commerce (D.Com) and other commercial and business-related fields. GIBCE Dadu plays a role in providing intermediate-level professional education to equip students with practical skills for the job market. They operate under the administrative control of the Sindh Technical Education and Vocational Training Authority (STEVTA).

== Schools ==
- OPF Public School Dadu: Established in September 1987, this school provides quality education and was one of the first English-medium schools in Dadu, primarily serving children of overseas Pakistanis.
- Various Government Colleges and Higher Secondary Schools: Offering intermediate (F.A., F.Sc., I.Com) and some bachelor's level education.
- Numerous Primary, Middle, and Secondary Schools: Both public and private schools form the foundation of the education system in Dadu city and its surrounding areas.

== See also ==
- Divisions of Pakistan
- Tehsils of Pakistan
  - Tehsils of Punjab, Pakistan
  - Tehsils of Khyber Pakhtunkhwa, Pakistan
  - Tehsils of Balochistan, Pakistan
  - Tehsils of Sindh, Pakistan
  - Tehsils of Azad Kashmir
  - Tehsils of Gilgit-Baltistan
- Districts of Pakistan
  - Districts of Khyber Pakhtunkhwa, Pakistan
  - Districts of Punjab, Pakistan
  - Districts of Balochistan, Pakistan
  - Districts of Sindh, Pakistan
  - Districts of Azad Kashmir
  - Districts of Gilgit-Baltistan
- Kohistan (Sindh)

== Bibliography ==
- 1998 District census report of Dadu. Census publication. Vol. 82. Islamabad: Population Census Organization, Statistics Division, Government of Pakistan. 2000.
