= Nani Gopal Majumdar =

Indian Bengali archaeologist

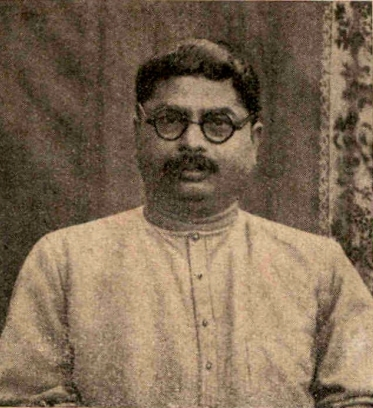
- Born: Nani Gopal; 1 December 1897; Jessore, Bengal Presidency, British India
- Died: 11 November 1938 (aged 40); Johi, Sind, British India
- Education: University of Calcutta
- Spouse: Snehlata Majumdar
- Scientific career
- Fields: Archaeology

Nani Gopal Majumdar, also known as N. G. Majumdar (1 December 1897 – 11 November 1938), was a Bengali archaeologist who is credited with having discovered 62 Indus Valley Civilisation sites in Sindh including Chanhudaro.

== Early life and education ==
Majumdar was born on 1 December 1897 to Baradaprasanna Majumdar and his wife Sarojini in the town of Jessore. Majumdar passed his M. A. from the University of Calcutta in 1920, winning a gold medal. He won a doctorate from the Calcutta University in 1923 for his thesis on "Vajra". The same year he joined the Archaeological Survey of India (ASI) and participated in the excavations at Mohenjodaro.

== Archaeology work ==
On 22 April 1929, Majumdar was appointed Superintendent of the Central Circle and served till 9 May 1929 when he was transferred to the Head Office in Calcutta as Assistant Superintendent.

== Explorations in Sindh ==
Majumdar first explored Sind in 1927. During his explorations, he discovered that the Lower Indus Valley was inhabited as early as the Early Indus period. Aided by a small grant, in 1927-28, Majumdar excavated the Indus Valley site of Jhukar near Mohenjodaro. In March 1930, Majumdar excavated two new sites of Tharo Hill and Chanhudaro.

In October 1930, Majumdar left Dokri near Mohenjodaro and headed southwest along the Kirthar Mountains. By the time he returned in March 1931, Majumdar had discovered more than 32 prehistoric sites. Majumdar wrote a detailed report of his explorations and excavations in his book Exploration in Sind (1934).

On 1 October 1938, Majumdar was once again deputed to Sindh for six months to explore the region for Indus Valley sites. Majumdar travelled over 200 miles on foot and discovered half a dozen sites of the Chalcolithic period.

== Death ==
On the morning of 11 November 1938, while offering puja at a small Hindu shrine close to his camp near the archaeological site of Rohelji Kund, on bank of Gaaj river, Johi, Dadu District, Majumdar was shot dead by bandits. A plaque marks the spot where he was killed.

== Personal life ==
Majumdar married Snehlata Mukherjee. The couple had two daughters and a son, Tapas Majumdar (1929-2010). Tapas, who was nine when Nani Gopal died, later graduated from the Presidency College, Calcutta where he served as a professor of economics.
