= Uttrad =

Linguistic and Historical Region of Sindh

Uttrad اُتراد (Sindhi)
- Region
- Country: Pakistan
- Province: Sindh

Languages
  - Main language: Sindhi
- Time zone: UTC+5 (PST)

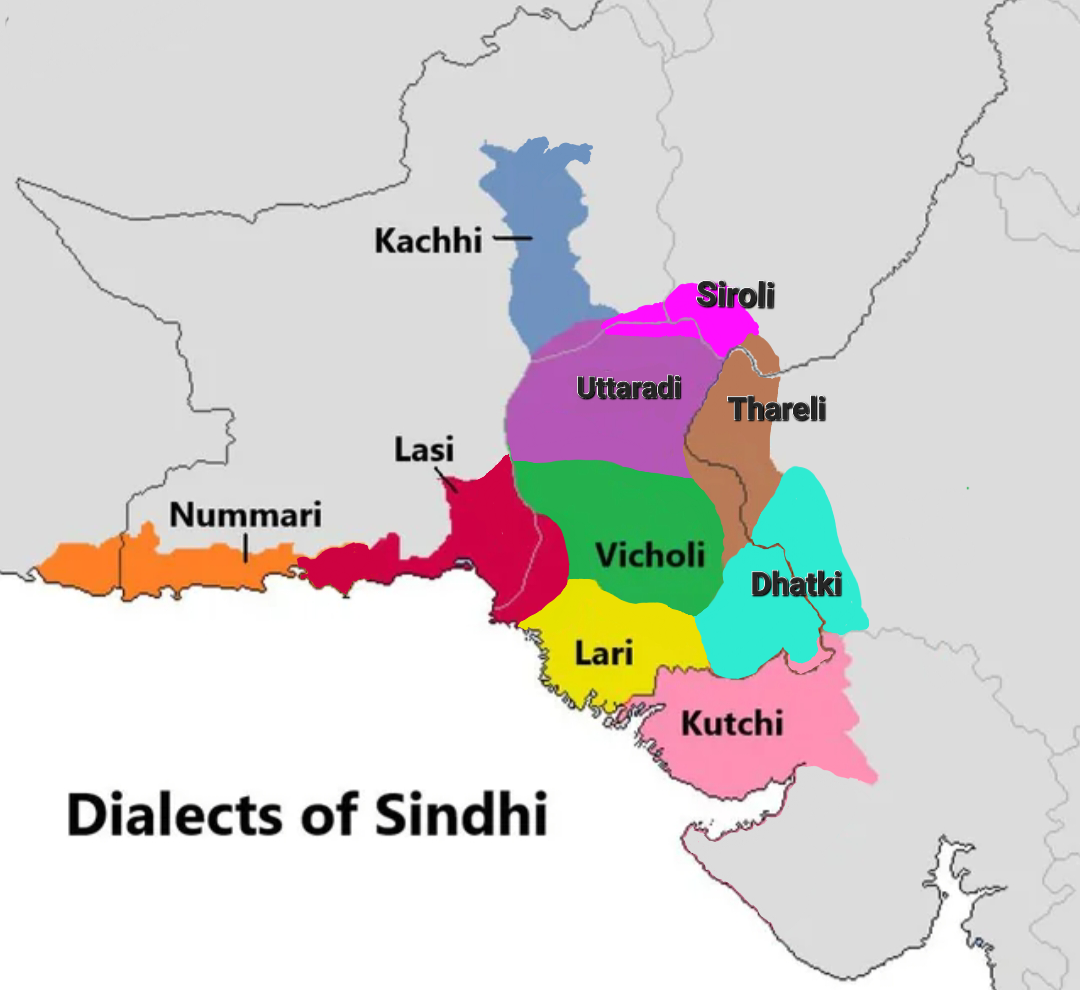
Map of Sindhi dialects and regions, With Utradi and Siroli referring to the Uttrad.

Uttrad (Sindhi: اُتراد) also known as Uttarad or Siro is a historical and linguistic region in Sindh consisting of the entirety of the Northern Sindh province. the Northern Sindh districts of Shikarpur, Sukkur, Kashmore, Jacobabad, Larkana, Ghotki, Nausharo Feroz, Qambar Shahdadkot, half of Khairpur and north of Dadu District till Sehwan is included in this region. The dialect of Sindhi spoken in Uttrad is presently called Utradi and was historically referred to as "Siroli".

== Etymology ==
Uttrad is derived from the Sindhi word Utar (اتر) meaning North.

== Dialect ==
The Dialect of Sindhi language spoken in the Uttrad Region is presently called Utradi while historically it was referred to as Siroli.

This dialect features certain pronunciations and grammatical traits that make it distinct from other dialects. It has a slight influence influenced by neighboring languages, namely Balochi and Saraiki. Among the features that set it apart from standard Sindhi, the first-person singular pronoun "maan" (meaning "I") remains unchanged across its nominative, accusative, prepositional, and other grammatical cases. Additionally, when forming the plural of feminine nouns ending with a Zabar (short vowel /a/), the suffix "-aan" is added (for example, khat becomes khattan).

== History ==
The ancient city of Aror in Uttrad was the capital of the Pre-Islamic Rai and Chach dynasties of Sindh, after the Arab conquest of Sindh the city of Aror became an influential city in Ummayad and Abbasid Sindh.

== See Also ==
- Sindh
- Sindhi language
- Sukkur Division
- Larkana Division
- Shikarpur
