= Wahi Pandhi =

- Permanent agriculture and nomadic tribes
- Location within Pakistan
- Coordinates: 26.66°N 67.355°E
- Country: Pakistan
- Province: Sindh
  - Density: 400/km^{2} (1,000/sq mi)
- Time zone: UTC+5 (PST)

Wahi Pandhi (Sindhi: واهي پانڌي, Urdu: واہی پاندھی) is a town near Johi, Dadu District of Sindh, Pakistan. A road from Wahi Pandhi leads to Gorakh Hill, a hill station in the Kirthar Mountains. An archaeological mound, locally famous as 'Kotero Daro', was explored by N. G. Majumdar during his explorations in Sindh from 1926 to 1929. The pottery of Amri and Harappan phase was explored at the mound.

== Gallery ==
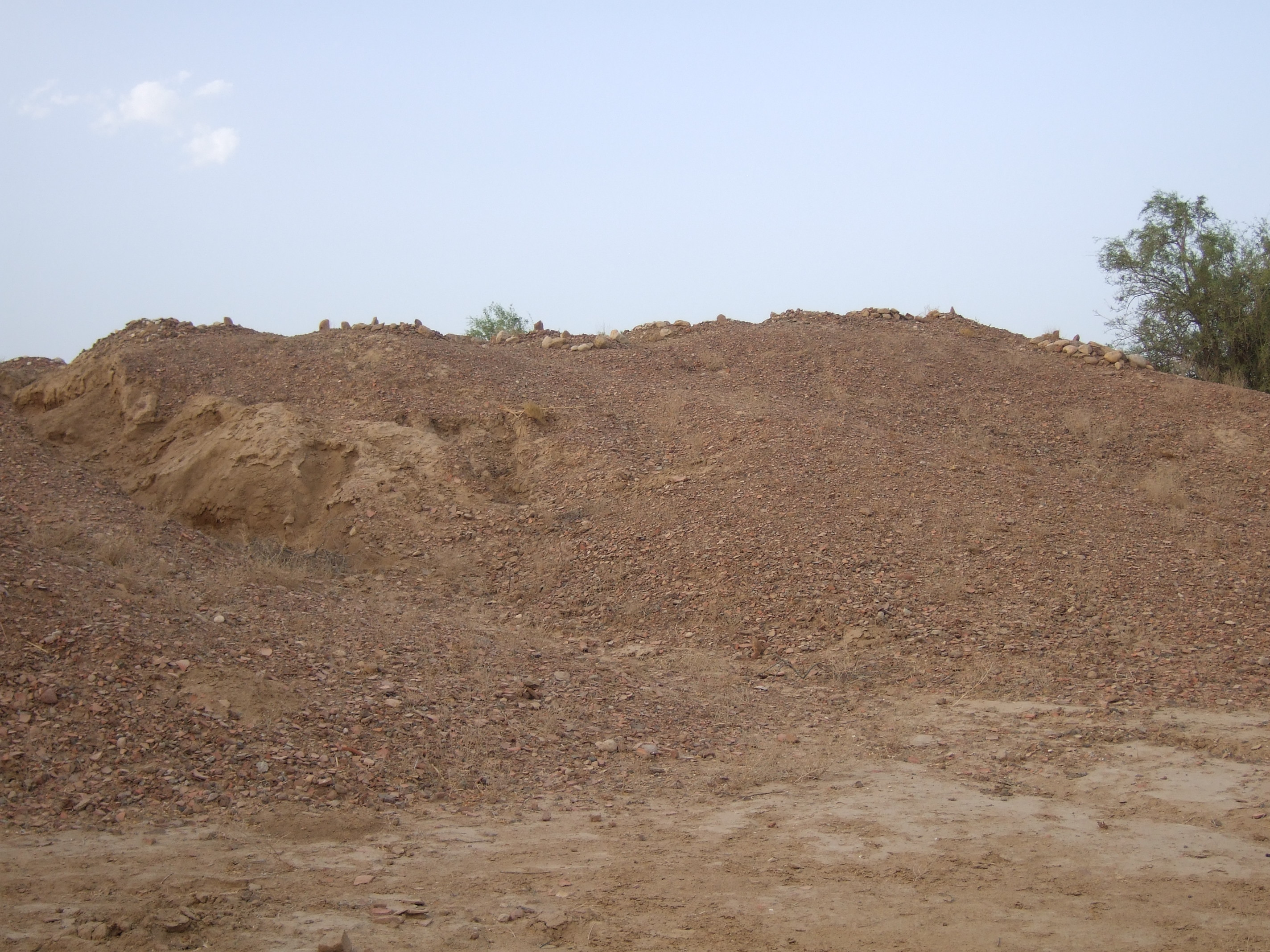
Village mounds at Wahi Pandhi (SD-13), a cultural heritage monument in Sindh

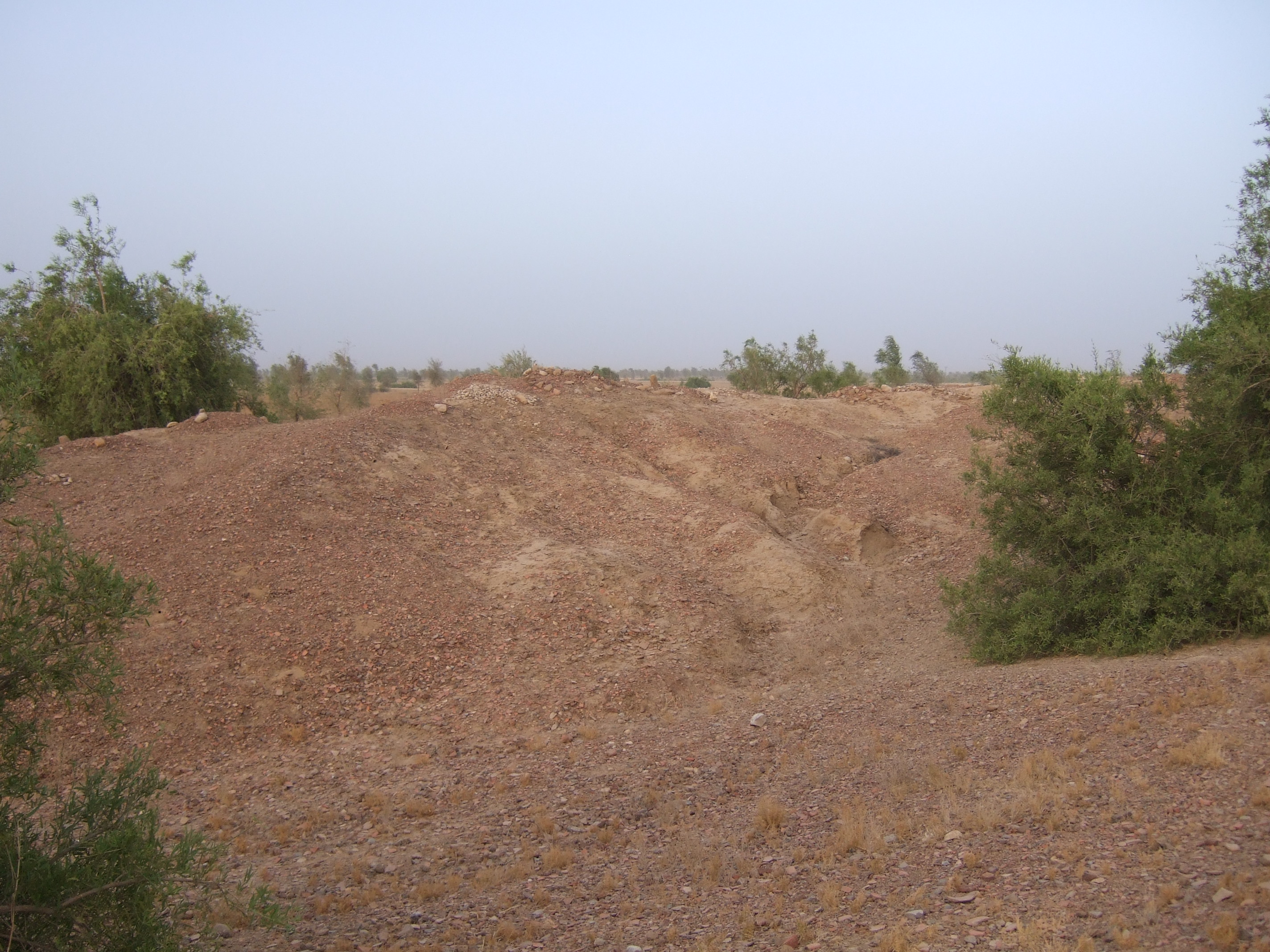
Ancient mound at Wahi Pandhi (SD-14), a cultural heritage monument in Sindh
