= Saurangpur =

Coordinates: 27°24′03″N 79°50′11″E

- Village
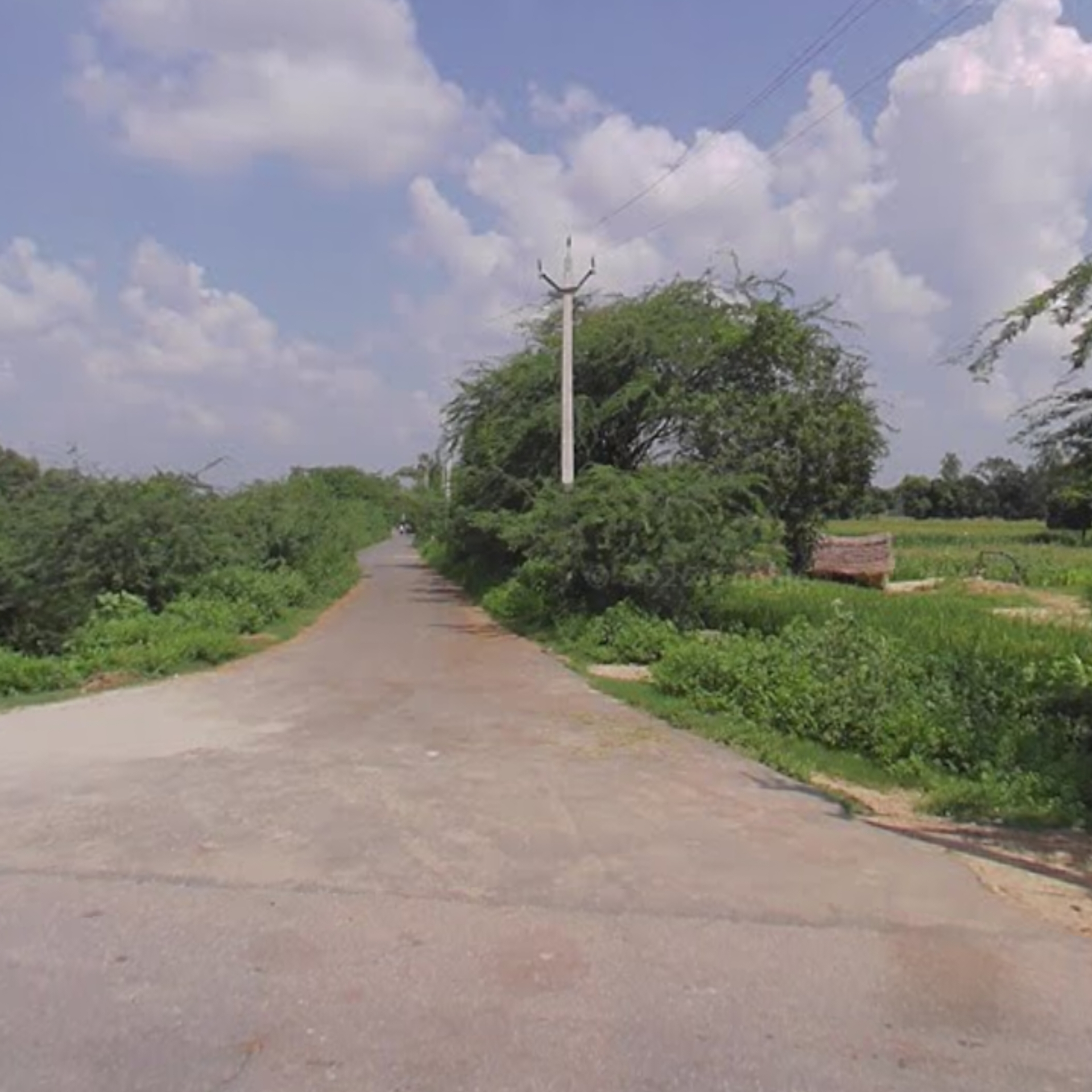

- Location in Uttar Pradesh, India Saurangpur (India)
- Country: India
- State: Uttar Pradesh
- District: Hardoi
- Tehsil: Sawayajpur

Government
  - Type: Panchayati Raj
  - Body: Gram Panchayat

Area
  - Total: 81.61 ha (201.7 acres)

Population (2011)
  - Total: 1,053

Demographics (2011)
  - Children (0–6): 219
  - Households: 175
  - Literacy rate: 65%
  - SC members: 163
- PIN: 241401

Saurangpur is a village in the Sawayajpur tehsil of Hardoi district in the Indian state of Uttar Pradesh. It is located c. 6 km (3.7 mi) from Sawayajpur and c. 36 km (22 mi) from Hardoi, the district's headquarters, and covers a geographical area of 81.61 hectares (201.7 acres).

The village comes under the administrative jurisdiction of the Chandrasipur Sahijna Gram Panchayat. Saurangpur is governed under Panchayati Raj system, with a Sarpanch as the elected head. It falls under the Sawaijpur Assembly constituency and the Hardoi Lok Sabha constituency.

== Demographics ==
According to the 2011 Census of India, Saurangpur has a population of 1,053 people, with 577 male and 476 female residents. There were 175 households recorded, and 219 children under the age of six. There were 163 members of scheduled castes in the village, and 511 residents were illiterate.
