= Nai Gaj =

Nai Gaj نئي گاج, نئی گاج
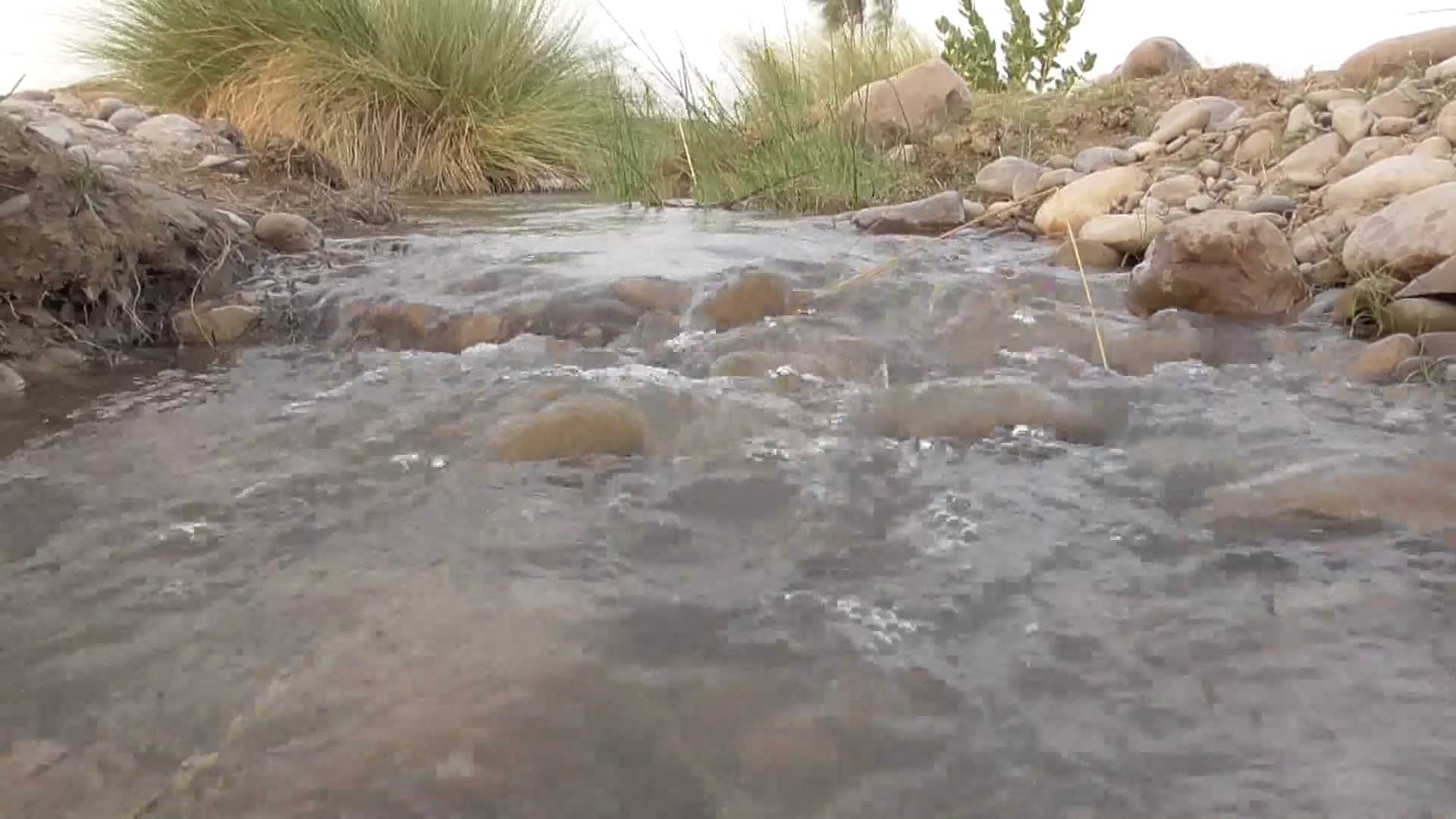
- A flow of Nai Gaj

Location
- Country: Pakistan

Physical characteristics
- Source
  - location: near Khuzdar
  - coordinates: 27°39′47″N 66°39′50″E
- Mouth
  - location: Lake Manchar
  - coordinates: 26°30′47″N 67°32′20″E

Basin features
- Progression: Lake Manchar→ Indus River→ Arabian Sea→ Indian Ocean
- River system: Indus River Valley

Nai Gaj (Sindhi: نئي گاج, Urdu: نئی گاج) is an ephemeral river in Dadu District of Sindh, Pakistan. The Government of Pakistan build the Nai Gaj Dam on its course. Nai Gaj drains part of the Kirthar Mountains, and flows from Balochistan province towards Sindh. It ends at Lake Manchar after flowing through the arid areas of Kachho in Dadu District.
