= Dadu Tehsil =

Coordinates: 26.333332°N 67.583331°E

- Tehsil
- Interactive map of Dadu Tehsil
- Country: Pakistan
- Province: Sindh
- District: Dadu District
- Time zone: UTC+5 (PST)
- Number of Union Councils: 15

Dadu Tehsil is an administrative subdivision (tehsil) of Dadu District in the Sindh province of Pakistan, the city of Dadu is the capital. Dadu tehsil consists of 15 union councils.
