= Johi, Dadu =

Johi جوهي
- Town
- Interactive map of Johi
- Location within Sindh Location within Pakistan
- Coordinates: 26°41′31″N 67°36′48″E
- Country: Pakistan
- Province: Sindh
- Division: Hyderabad
- District: Dadu
- Elevation: 1,511 m (4,957 ft)

Population (2017)
  - Total: 29,031
- Time zone: UTC+05:00 (PKT)

Johi (Sindhi: جوهي) is a town in Dadu District, Hyderabad Division, Sindh province of Pakistan. It is located along Sindh's border with the Balochistan province. Johi is headquarters of Johi Tehsil. A civil hospital is also in Johi.

== History ==
Johi is commonly known as the historical area and has many villages like Haji Khan Hairo Khan, Bazmaal khoso, Drigh Bala, Rajaghanda and many similar villages. It has many visiting places people here depend on the rain water and do crops as land is very rich in minerals. The ancient place of Ghazi Shah Mound is located near Johi towards south-west.

The Buddhist monument Thul Hairo Khan is towards its north-west. It has historical town Wahi Pandhi and at a distance of 50 km from Wahi Pandhi Taluka Johi there is Gorakh Hill Station. Which is situated in Kirthar Mountains Range and in mountainous area of Johi many water streams and hill torrents known as Nai Gaj, Taqi, Nali and many other flow towards Kachho desert.

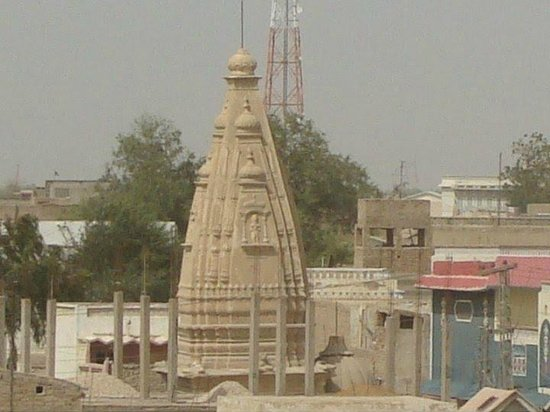
Shiva Mandir at Johi

Shiva Mandir Johi is one of the main old religious and sacred places in Johi town.

== See also ==
- List of Hindu temples in Pakistan
