= Johi Tehsil =

District in Sindh province of Pakistan

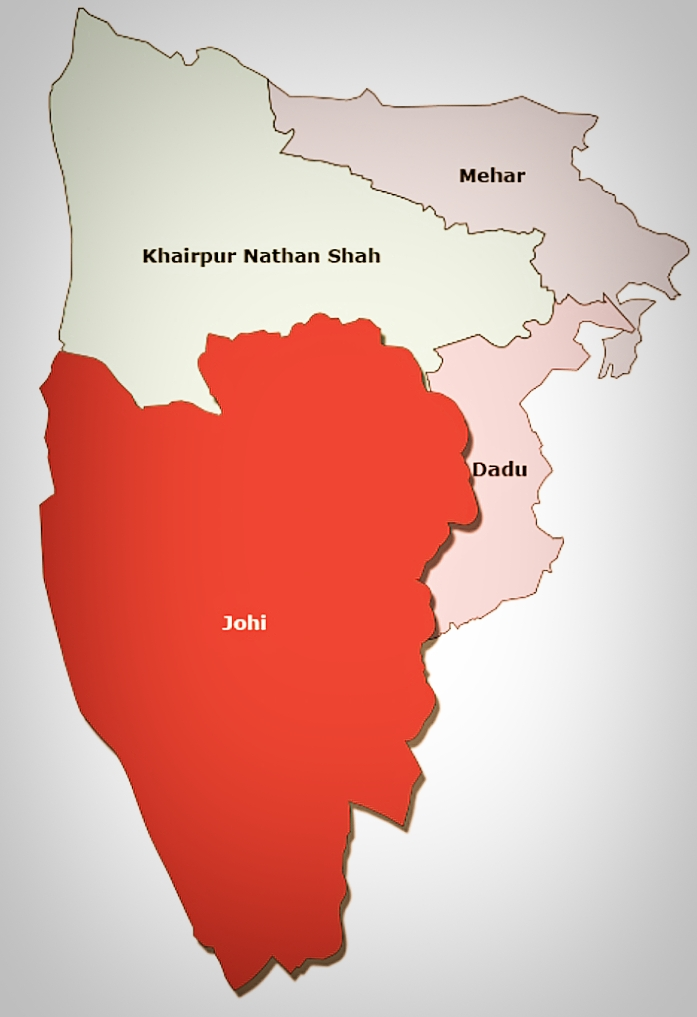

Johi Tehsil is an administrative subdivision (Tehsil) of Dadu District in Sindh province of Pakistan. Johi Town is its capital. Its area is 3,616 km². The tehsil, also known as Taluka, consists of 14 union councils, including Tando Rahim Khan (TRK) and Sawaro.

In British period Johi was a Taluka of Karachi District until 1907. Later, it was included in Larkana District. In 1931, Dadu was given status of District and Johi was included as a Taluka of Dadu District.
