= Kachho =

Semi-desert region in Sindh, Pakistan

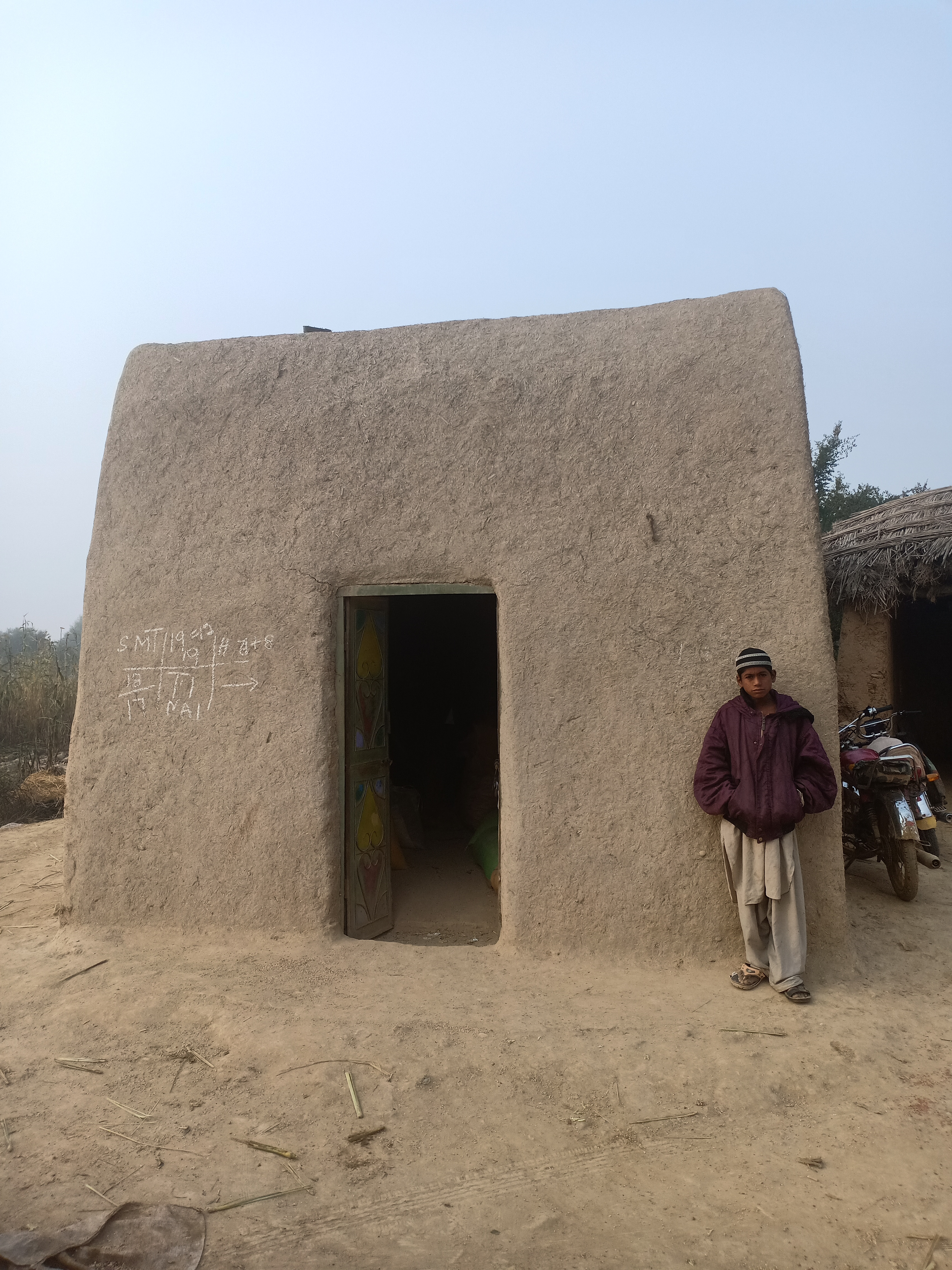

Kachho or Kachho Desert (Sindhi: ڪاڇو or ڪاڇو) is a Sub Region divided between Siro (Northern) and Kohistan Region and a semi desert area of Sindh, Pakistan. Kachho is rich in fertile soil and forests. The people cultivate many kind of crops in Kachho.

== Etymology ==
The Kachho is denoted from word of Sindhi language Kachh (Sindhi: ڪڇ) which stands for a lap or an armpit.

== Geography ==
Kaccho is a sub-region dived between Northern Sindh (Locally called Siro) and Central Sindh (locally called Vicholo). It is spread over two districts of Sindh Province, Dadu District and Qambar Shahdadkot District.

The desert of Kachho is near the lap of the Kirthar Mountains range. History reveals that the area of the Kachho desert including Lake Manchar appeared in the result of flow of big branch of the Indus River in earliest times which had been flowing from Kashmore-Kandhkot to Luki Mountains.

== History and Archeology ==
The Kachho is affluent in archaeological and historical sites. The several historic and prehistoric remains of civilizations can be observed herein Kachho desert from Neolithic and Bronze Age to British period.

== Rain and Water Issues ==
Kachho depends on rains. If it rains Kachho becomes prosperous because people cultivate lands and crops which boost the economy of the region including whole country. Due to rains the water level too increases and an environment also becomes pleasant. Mostly, the trees are big reason for heavy rains and good environment of the area. Numerous trees of Kachho desert have been cutting for sell since last many years. Thus, the environment is very pretentious and water level is dropped from 150 feet to 450 feet. The wells dug by people now became dry. The people of several villages of Kachho suffer for fresh drinking water.
