= Kirthar National Park =

National park in Sindh, Pakistan

- Urdu: کِیرتھر نیشنل پارک
- IUCN category II (national park)
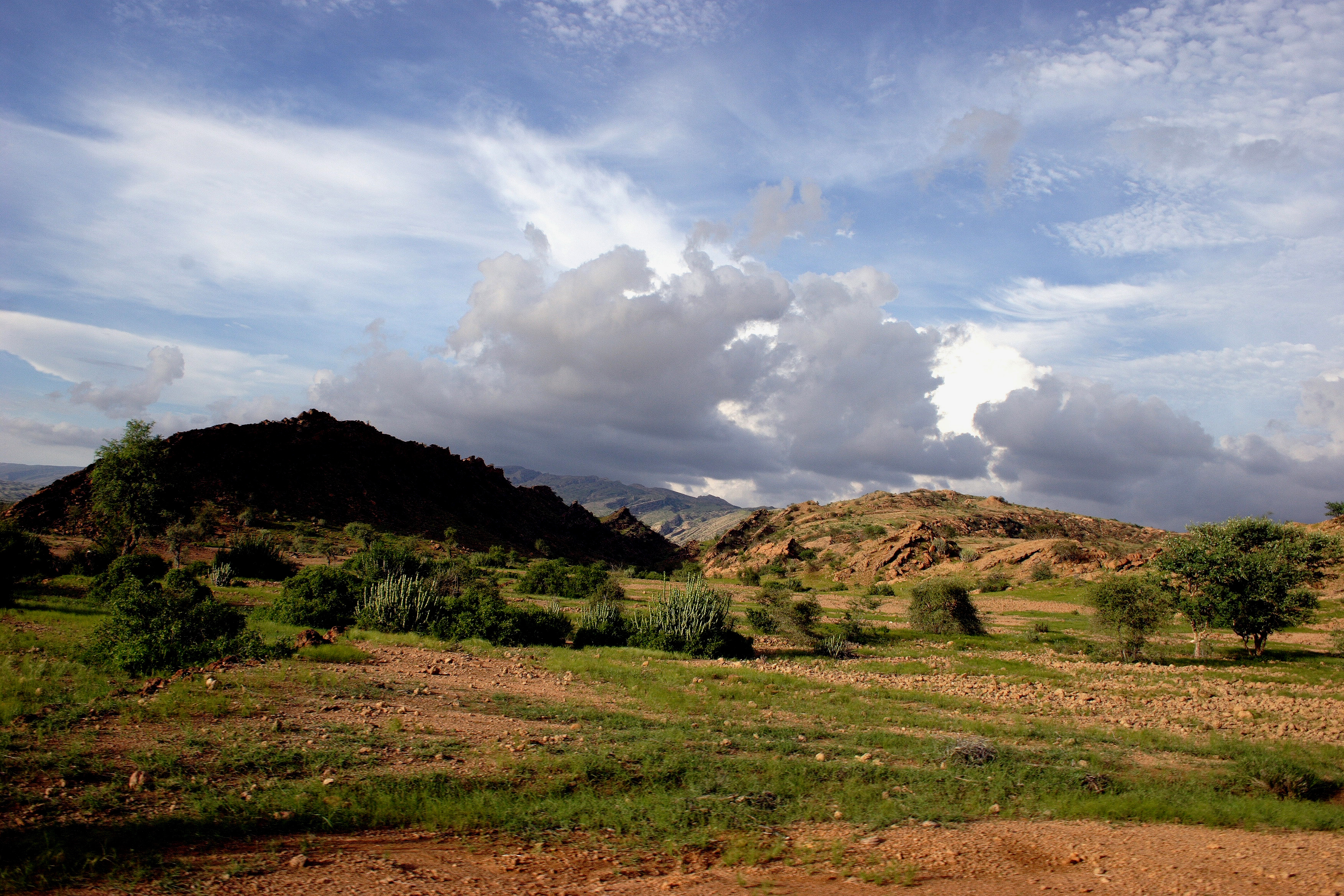
- View of the Kirthar National Park

- Location within Pakistan Location within Sindh
- Location: Jamshoro and Dadu districts, Sindh, Pakistan
- Nearest city: Jamshoro
- Coordinates: 25°42′N 67°35′E
- Area: 3,087 km^{2} (1,192 sq mi)
- Established: 31 January 1974
- Governing body: Sindh Wildlife Department

Kirthar National Park is a national park located in the Kirthar Mountains range in Dadu and Jamshoro districts of Sindh, Pakistan. Lying north to Karachi, the park was established in 1974 and encompasses over 3,087 km^{2} (1,192 sq mi), making it the third largest national park in Pakistan. Wildlife in the park comprises leopard, striped hyena, Indian wolf, honey badger, urial, chinkara gazelle and rare Sindh ibex. Blackbuck are kept in enclosures for a reintroduction project.

== Status ==
The site of the Kirthar National Park was initially designated a wildlife sanctuary in 1972 before getting the official status of national park two years later in 1974. It was the second to be declared a national park in Pakistan after the Lal Suhanra National Park. The park along with the Hub Dam site area attained the status of the Important Bird and Biodiversity Area (IBA) in 2004.

== Fauna ==
=== Mammals ===
38 species of mammals are native to Kirthar National Park:

- Indian leopard, Panthera pardus fusca
- Asiatic wildcat, Felis lybica ornata
- Jungle cat, Felis chaus
- Caracal, Caracal caracal caracal
- Indian wolf, Canis lupus pallipes
- Golden jackal, Canis aureus persica
- White-footed fox, Vulpes vulpes pusilla
- Striped hyena, Hyaena hyaena hyaena
- Indian grey mongoose, Urva edwardsii edwardsii
- Smooth-coated otter, Lutrogale perspicillata sindica
- Honey badger, Mellivora capensis indica
- Small Indian civet, Viverricula indica
- Asian palm civet, Paradoxurus hermaphroditus
- Cairo spiny mouse, Acomys cahirinus
- Sand-colored soft-furred rat, Millardia gleadowi
- Indian bush rat, Golunda ellioti
- Indian gerbil, Tatera indica
- Indian bush rat, Golunda ellioti
- Lesser bandicoot rat, Bandicota bengalensis
- Greater bandicoot rat, Bandicota indica
- Northern palm squirrel, Funambulus pennantii
- Indian hare, Lepus nigricollis
- Asian house shrew, Suncus murinus
- Anderson's shrew, Suncus stoliczkanus
- Sind bat, Rhyneptesicus nasutus
- Sindh ibex, Capra aegagrus blythi
- Urial, Ovis vignei blanfordi
- Chinkara, Gazella bennettii fuscifrons
- Blackbuck (reintroduced), Antilope cervicapra
- Nilgai, Boselaphus tragocamelus
- Indian boar, Sus scrofa cristatus
- Arabian wolf, Canis lupus arabs
- Indian pangolin, Manis crassicaudata
- Rhesus macaque, Macaca mulatta
- Northern plains gray langur, Semnopithecus entellus
- Indian hedgehog, Paraechinus micropus
- Brandt's hedgehog, Paraechinus hypomelas
- Indian crested porcupine, Hystrix indica

=== Birds ===
At least 165 species of birds have been recorded in Kirthar National Park. Species found in the park include bearded vulture (winter migratory), Bonelli's eagle, imperial eagle, tawny eagle, golden eagle, Black eagle, Black kite, Black-winged kite, Indian vulture, griffon vulture, Egyptian vulture, cinereous vulture, laggar falcon, red-necked falcon, common kestrel, crowned sandgrouse, MacQueen's bustard, Chukar partridge, grey partridge, see-see partridge, Grey francolin, Black francolin, Indian peafowl, House crow, Common myna, House sparrow, White-eared bulbul, Red-vented bulbul, Asian koel, Greenish warbler (winter migratory), Purple sunbird, white-tailed lapwing, chestnut-bellied sandgrouse, Lichtenstein's sandgrouse, painted sandgrouse, Indian eagle-owl, Barn owl, Sind woodpecker, hypocolius, Hume's wheatear, long-billed pipit, crested bunting, desert lark, hoopoe and Indian silverbill.

=== Reptiles ===
The following reptile species occur in Kirthar National Park: Mugger crocodile, Indian python, Indian cobra, Russell's viper, Indian saw-scaled viper, Sind krait, Black copper rat snake, desert monitor, yellow monitor, Oriental garden lizard, Northern house gecko, common dotted garden skink, Indian chameleon, Indian star tortoise, brown roofed turtle, black pond turtle, Indian softshell turtle.

=== Amphibians ===
Six amphibian species occur in Kirthar National Park: Asian common toad, skittering frog, Indian bullfrog, Indian burrowing frog and long-legged cricket frog.

== Flora ==
Grasses: Cymbopogon jwarancusa, Chrysopogon aucheri, Pennisetum divisum, Cenchrus setiger, Lasiurus scindicus, Panicum turgidum, Stipagrostis plumosa, Aristida adscensionis, Eragrostis minor, Sporobolus ioclados, Phragmites australis, Cynodon dactylon

Woody trees: Prosopis cineraria, Acacia nilotica, Acacia senegal, Tamarix aphylla, Salvadora oleoides, Commiphora wightii Boswellia sacra, Dodonaea viscosa, Grewia tenax, Calotropis procera, Azadirachta indica, Bombax ceiba

Herbs: Ipomoea pes-caprae, Tribulus terrestris, Tribulus longipetalus, Aerva javanica, Aerva persica, Cleome viscosa, Cleome scaposa, Heliotropium strigosum, Heliotropium europaeum, Farsetia hamiltonii, Amaranthus viridis

== See also ==
- Gabar dams
- List of parks and gardens in Karachi
