= Hutu-Tutsi dwarf shrew =

Conservation status
- Least Concern (IUCN 3.1)

Scientific classification
- Kingdom: Animalia
- Phylum: Chordata
- Class: Mammalia
- Order: Eulipotyphla
- Family: Soricidae
- Genus: Suncus
- Species: S. hututsi

Binomial name
- Suncus hututsi Kerbis Peterhans & Hutterer, 2009

Species of mammal

The Hutu-Tutsi dwarf shrew (Suncus hututsi) is a species of mammal in the family Soricidae. It is known from a small portion of the mountains of tropical Africa.

== Taxonomy ==
It is named after the Hutus and Tutsis, the two major ethnic groups of Burundi, where the species was first discovered to science.

== Distribution and habitat ==
It is known from Burundi and Uganda, and may potentially be found in Rwanda and the Democratic Republic of the Congo. It is thought to be an endemic of the Albertine Rift montane forests. It was first collected and described from Kibira National Park, Burundi.

== Description ==
It is a dark-colored species smaller than the least dwarf shrew (S. infinitesimus) and slightly larger than Remy's pygmy shrew (S. remyi). It has a reduced coronoid process and a very short upper tooth row.

== Status ==
Due to lack of information on threats, it is classified as Data Deficient by the IUCN Red List. It may be threatened by deforestation and human intrusion on its habitat due to local civil unrest. Its type locality of Kibira National Park has been affected by the Burundian Civil War.
