= Takkar National Park =

National park in Sindh, Pakistan

- IUCN category II (national park)
- Location: Kot Diji taluka, Sukkur district, Sindh, Pakistan
- Area: 17,540 acres (7,100 ha)
- Governing body: Sindh wildlife department

Takkar National Park is located in the Sindh province of Pakistan, and represents the second national park in the region, coming into existence 46 years after the establishment of the first one, Kirthar National Park in 1974. This park spans across approximately 17,540 acres of land in the Kot Diji taluka, Sukkur district. The park's terrain is characterized by a diverse landscape, encompassing mountains, plains, and deserts.

== Biodiveristy ==
The selected location for establishing the park boasts a thriving biodiversity, home to various animal species such as foxes, jackals, jungle cats, chinkara deer, houbara bustards, falcons, and numerous other wildlife, in addition to abundant vegetation. According to Deputy Conservator Adnan Khan from the Sindh Wildlife Department (SWD), there are no human settlements near the park. This absence of human habitation is expected to greatly contribute to the growth of animal populations in the region once the site receives official protection status.

== Future developments ==
The government plans to establish tourism checkpoints at the site and undertake the reintroduction of several animal species, including the chinkara deer. The area designated for the park was previously home to a variety of animal species that had disappeared from the region after the 1990s. Many of these species are now slated for reintroduction in this area.
