= Madagascan pygmy shrew =

Conservation status
- Least Concern (IUCN 3.1)

Scientific classification
- Kingdom: Animalia
- Phylum: Chordata
- Class: Mammalia
- Order: Eulipotyphla
- Family: Soricidae
- Genus: Suncus
- Species: S. madagascariensis

Binomial name
- Suncus madagascariensis (Coquerel, 1848)
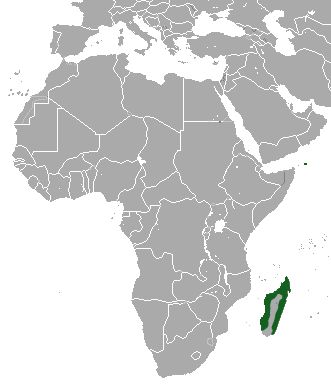
- Madagascan pygmy shrew range
- Madagascan pygmy shrew range in Madagascar

Synonyms
- Suncus etruscus (Savi, 1822)

Species of mammal

The Madagascan pygmy shrew (Suncus madagascariensis) is a species of mammal in the family Soricidae. It is the only known Malagasy shrew.

== Taxonomy ==
Some taxonomists regard it as conspecific with the widely distributed Etruscan shrew, the smallest known mammal by mass, and likely to have been introduced to Madagascar from India or Southeast Asia by humans. It is found in Madagascar and the Comoros, at altitudes from sea level to 1500 m.

== Distribution and habitat ==
It is thought to be more common in the less humid western and southern parts of Madagascar. This shrew may also be present on Socotra. The species is found primarily in forests.

== Diet and behaviour ==
It is presumed to be solitary, nocturnal and insectivorous, like its relatives. The litter size is one or two. It is threatened by logging and other forms of deforestation.
