= Malayan pygmy shrew =

Conservation status
- Least Concern (IUCN 3.1)

Scientific classification
- Kingdom: Animalia
- Phylum: Chordata
- Class: Mammalia
- Order: Eulipotyphla
- Family: Soricidae
- Genus: Suncus
- Species: S. malayanus

Binomial name
- Suncus malayanus (Kloss, 1917)
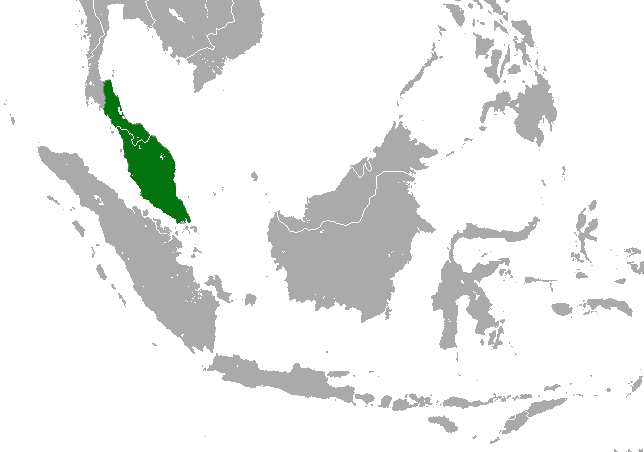
- Malayan pygmy shrew range

Species of mammal

The Malayan pygmy shrew (Suncus malayanus) is a species of mammal in the family Soricidae. It can be found in Malaysia and Thailand. Its natural habitat is subtropical or tropical dry forests.
