= Day's shrew =

Conservation status
- Endangered (IUCN 3.1)

Scientific classification
- Kingdom: Animalia
- Phylum: Chordata
- Class: Mammalia
- Order: Eulipotyphla
- Family: Soricidae
- Genus: Suncus
- Species: S. dayi

Binomial name
- Suncus dayi (Dodson, 1888)
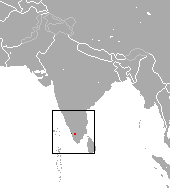
- Day's shrew range

Species of mammal

Day's shrew (Suncus dayi) is a species of mammal in the family Soricidae. It is endemic to India. Its natural habitat is subtropical or tropical dry forests. It is threatened by habitat loss.
