= Kirthar Mountains =

Mountain range in Pakistan

- Location within Pakistan

Highest point
- Peak: Zardak Peak
- Elevation: 2,260 m (7,410 ft)
- Coordinates: 27°00′00″N 67°09′20″E

Naming
- Native name: کير ٿر جبل (Sindhi); كوه کیر تھر (Urdu)

Geography
- Location: Sindh and Balochistan provinces

The Kheerthar Mountains (Urdu: كوه کھیرتھر; Sindhi: کير ٿر جبل) are a mountain range in the Kohistan region of Sindh, that marks the boundary between the Pakistani provinces of Balochistan and Sindh, also separating the Iranian plateau from the Indian subcontinent. It comprises much of the Kheerthar National Park. The mountain range forms part of the Kirthar-Sulaiman geological province, which stretches from the Arabian Sea coast north to the Sulaiman Mountains in northwest Pakistan. The highest peak of the Kheerthar range is Zardak Peak at 7,430 ft (2,260 m).

== Etymology ==
The name "Kirthar" is believed to have evolved from the combination of two elements: "kir" and "thar." The term "Kir" is likely derived from the older Sindhi pronunciation of the word for ‘mountain’ whose original root likely comes from the Sanskrit word "giri" (गिरि), which also means mountain or hill. Over time, as languages evolved and adapted, "giri" transformed into "gir" in Gujarati and further into "kir" in Sindhi. "Thar" on the other hand refers to the arid and dry nature of the surrounding landscape, reminiscent of the Thar Desert, which lies just to the east of the Indus River. The term "thar" signifies the desert-like characteristics of the region, marked by its dry climate and sparse vegetation. Thus, "Kirthar" in older sindhi is interpreted as "mountains of the desert," reflecting the unique topography of the area where the Kirthar Range rises above the arid plains, transitioning into hilly terrain and dry landscapes.

In the Sanskrit Ramayana epic the Kirthar Mountains and the entire Kohistan (Sindh) region is mentioned as Somagiri.

== Geography ==
Kirthar Mountains are a part of the Kohistan Region of Western Sindh. The Kirthar mountains extend southward for about 190 mi (310 km) from the Mula River in east-central Balochistan to Cape Monze on the Arabian Sea. In total, the Kirthars cover an area of about 9,000 square kilometers. The Khasa Hills and Mulri Hills close to the Arabian Sea coast are sub-ranges of the Kirthar Mountains which extend into the city limits of Karachi. The mountains are drained by the Gaj River and Hub River.

=== Mountain peaks ===
The highest peak of the mountains is Zardak Peak at 9,498 ft (2,895 m). The second tallest, Drakhel Hill, that was reported by British Army Corps of Engineers surveyed it as 8,135 ft (2,479 m) Barugh Hill, has a height that was reported in April 2009 as 7,056 ft (2,151 m), although the British Army Corps of Engineers surveyed it as 7,122 ft (2,171 m). Barugh Hill is the highest mountain in the Sindh portion of the Kirthars. Barugh, means "big fat mountain" in the Brahui language, the language of the Sasoli tribe, who still live in the area. Barugh Hill is situated a few miles north-west of the Gorakh Hill Station, which is situated at an elevation of 5,688 ft (1,734 m).

The next highest peak is the 6,880-foot-tall (2,100 m) mountain Kutte-Ji-Kabar (Sindhi for "Dog's Grave"), also known as Kuchak-na-Kabar in Brahui. The mountain is located in a region claimed by the provincial governments of Sindh and Balochistan. As recorded in Folk Tales of Scinde and Guzerat (circa 1855), the mountain is named for a story in which a Brahui man is forced to leave his dog as collateral to a wealthy Hindu merchant in order to settle his debts. According to the tale, the dog chased after thieves who had stolen from the merchant, leading the merchant to free him and return to his master. The Brahui man thought the dog escaped and so was angry with the dog for his disobedience. The rejected dog died, and when the Brahui man came to learn of the true story, he felt remorseful and climbed to the top of the mountain in order to bury his dog.

Other peaks include the Andraj Mountain at 6,496 ft (1,980 m). There are also a number of other peaks of the Kirthar Mountains exceeding 5,500 ft (1,700 m), which all receive occasional heavy snowfall during the winter season. To the south the mountains decrease in size towards Bedor Hill, with a height of 3,320 ft (1,010 m).

=== Passes ===
There are several passes in the range which are passable, but the only one often used is the Gaji Lak Pass on the road from Zidi and Khuzdar to Jhalawan.

== Geology ==
The Kirthars consist of a series of parallel rock hill ridges oriented mostly north–south, with piedmont and piedmont-alluvial plains located between ridges, with dry riverbeds. The ridges rise rapidly over short distances between valleys and ridges. From the Arabian Sea coast, they rise to nearly 8,300 ft (2,500 m) in the north. They are anticlinal with the northern and western sides generally steeper than the southern and eastern sides.

The Kirthars are part of the Kirthar-Sulaiman geologic province, which stretches from the Arabian Sea coast north to northwestern Pakistan along the western boundary of the Indus Valley. The upper portions of the mountains are largely limestone, while the middle and southern portions of the mountain are shale which date to the middle Eocene era.

== Settlement ==
Within the Kirthar Mountains are 21 prehistoric sites. The 16th-18th century Taung Tombs are also located in the range. There are 71 tombs situated in the areas inhabited by the Chhutta tribe. The chief inhabitants are the Chhutto people of the Soomra tribe, alongside various Sindhi and Balochi tribes who subsist by flock grazing. Major tribes living in the Kirthar are Chhutta, Burfat, Gabol, Marri, Bozdar, Lund, Nohani, Bugti, Chandio, and Lashari.

== Gallery ==
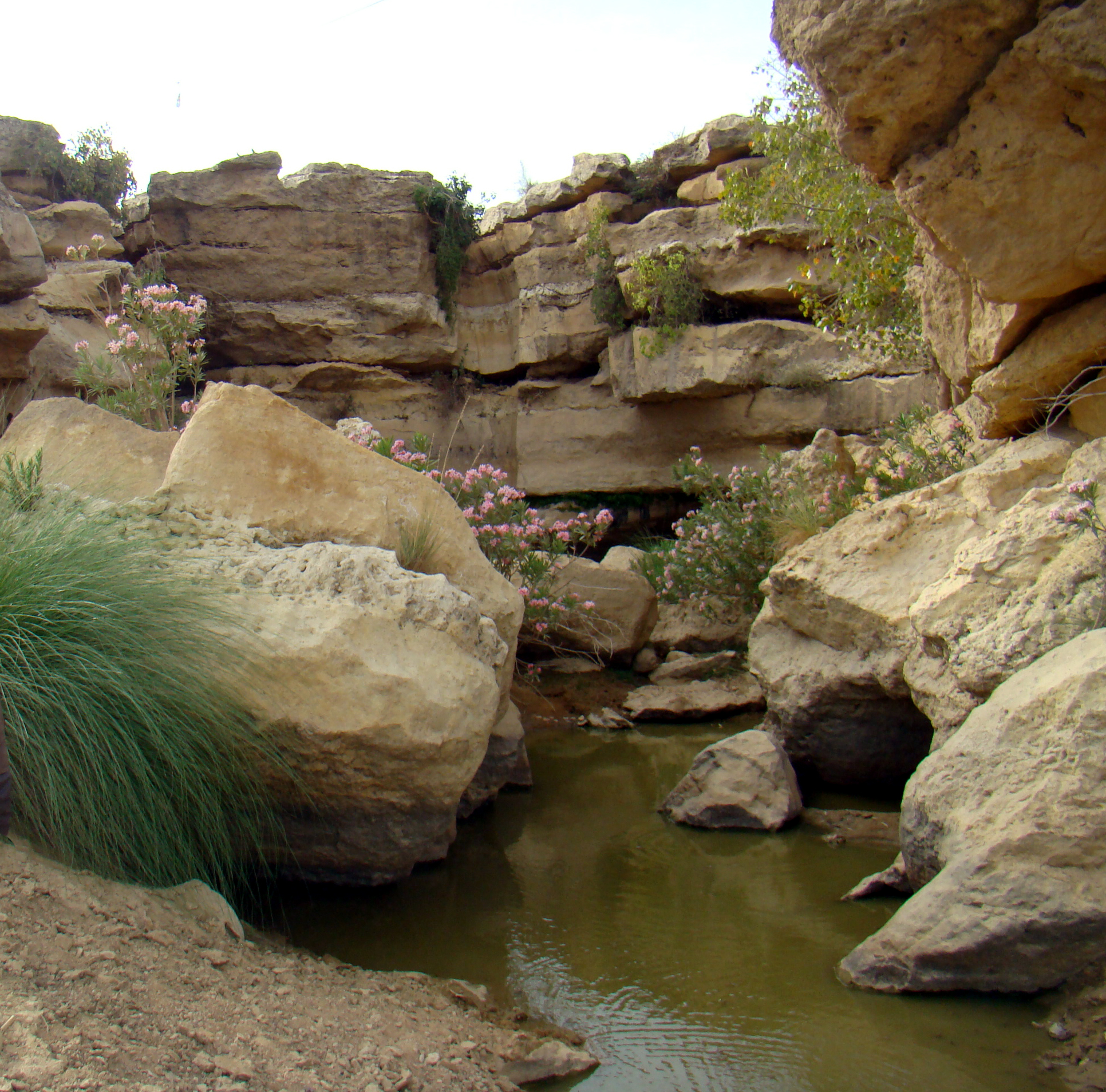
Cold water spring in the Kirthar National Park

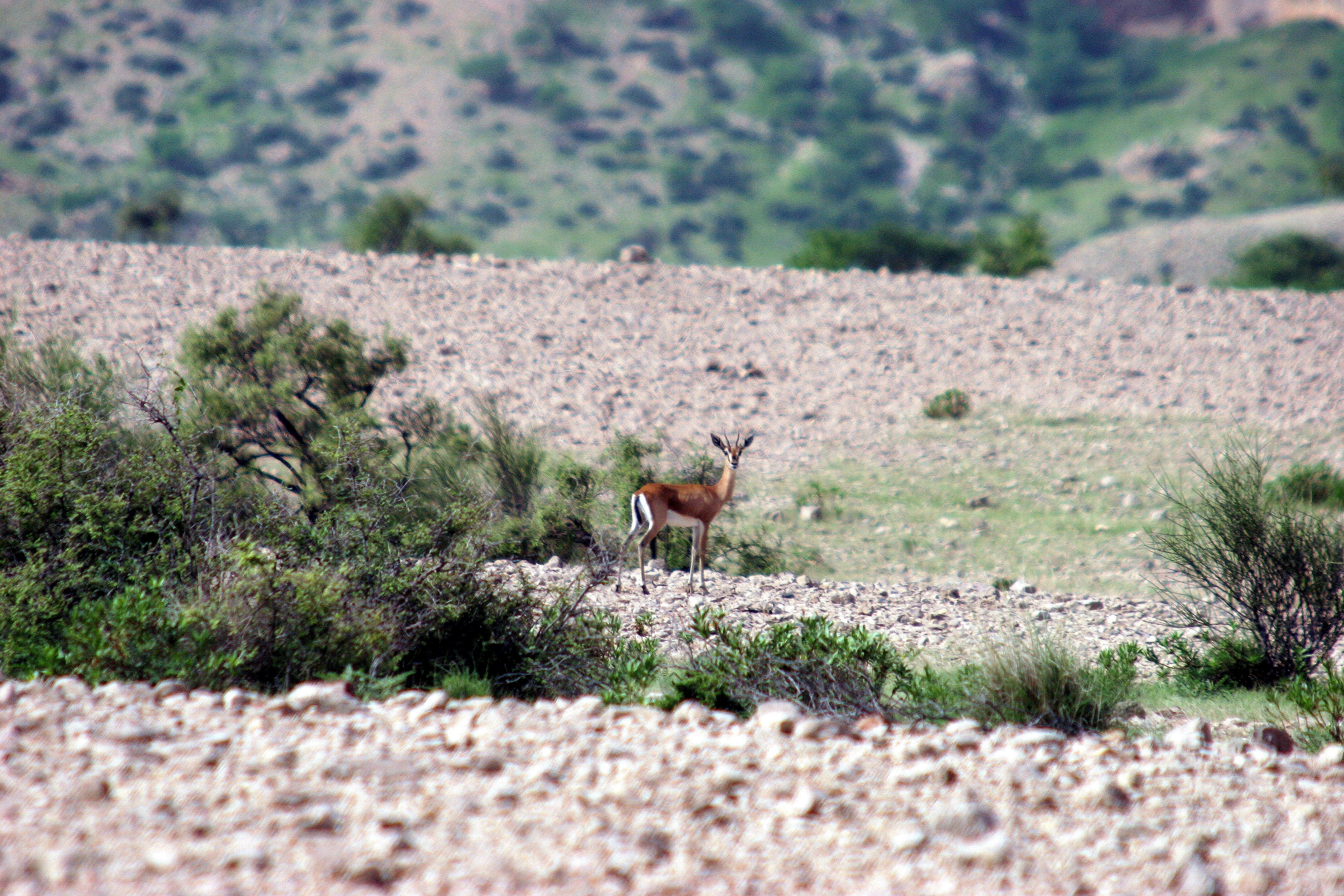
Chinkara gazelle in the Kirthar Mountains

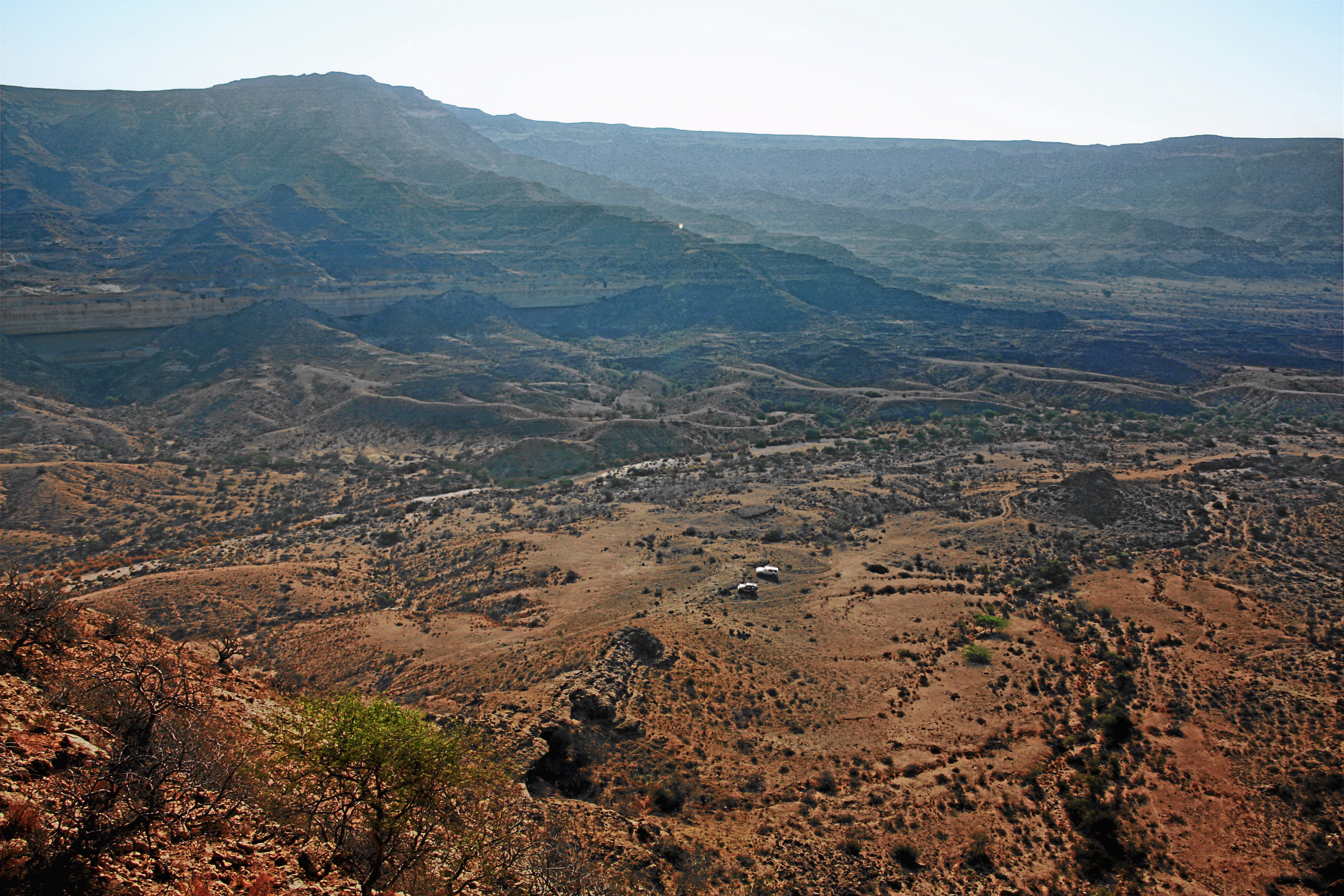
Another view of the Kirthar National Park

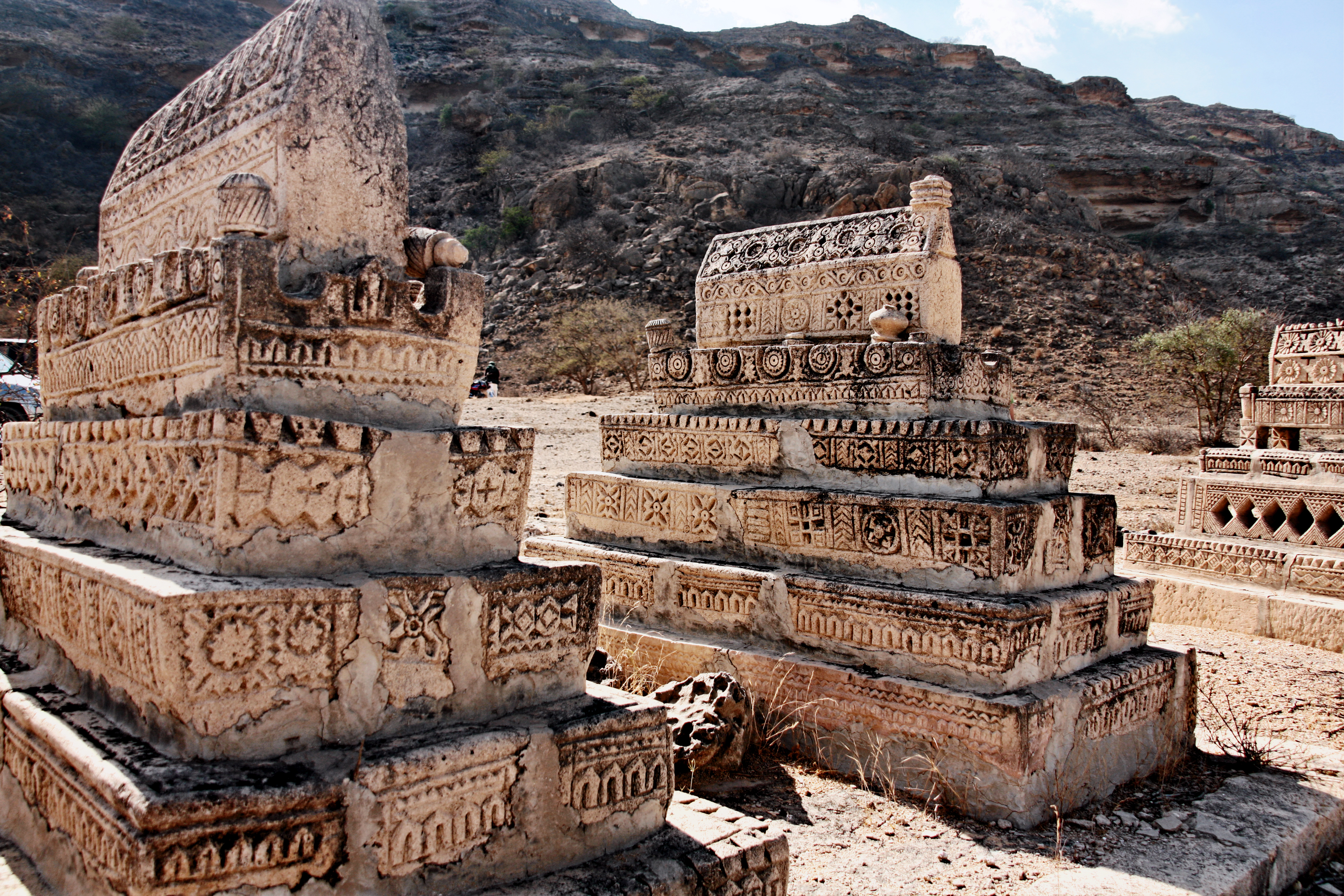
The Taung Tombs

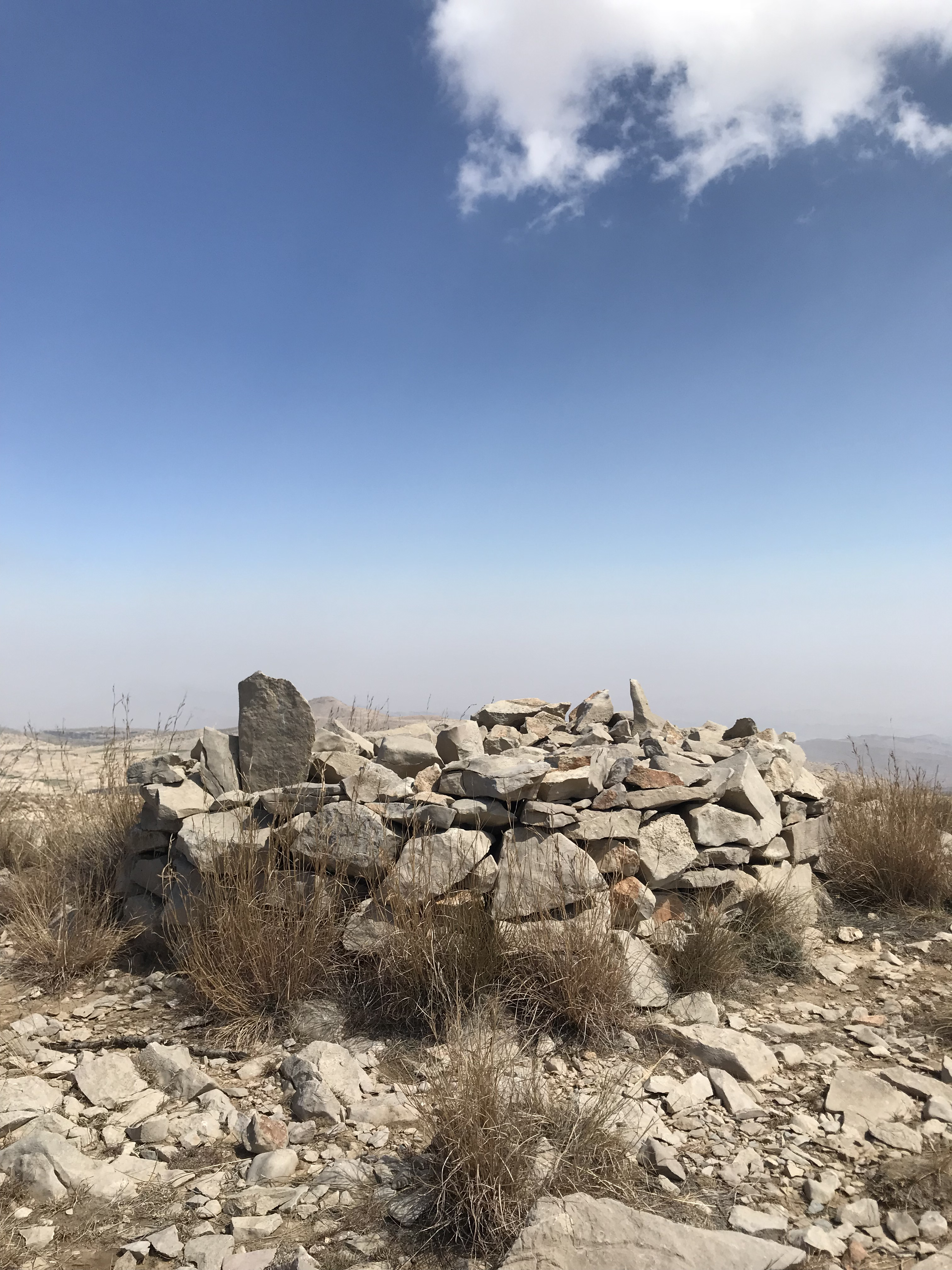
The "Dog's Grave" at Kutte-ji-Qabar

== See also ==
- Gabar dams
- List of mountain ranges of Pakistan
- List of mountains in Pakistan
- Bado Hill Station
