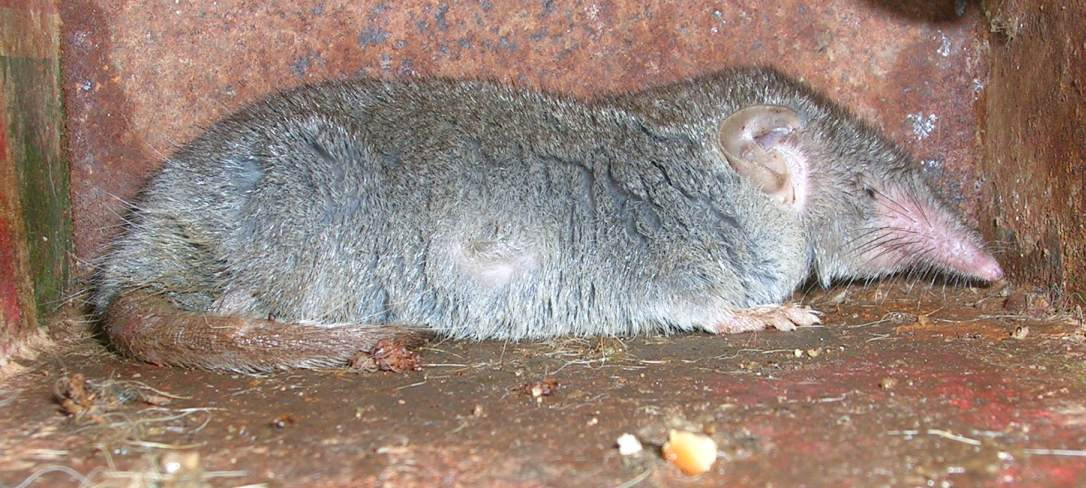
- Asian house shrew (Suncus murinus)

Scientific classification
- Kingdom: Animalia
- Phylum: Chordata
- Class: Mammalia
- Order: Eulipotyphla
- Family: Soricidae
- Subfamily: Crocidurinae
- Genus: Suncus; Ehrenberg, 1832

Type species
- Suncus sacer

Species
- See text

= Suncus =

Suncus Temporal range: Late Pliocene to Recent

Genus of mammals

Suncus is a genus of shrews in the family Soricidae.

== Classification ==
- Genus Suncus
  - Taita shrew, Suncus aequatorius
  - Black shrew, Suncus ater
  - Day's shrew, Suncus dayi
  - Etruscan shrew, Suncus etruscus
  - Sri Lankan shrew, Suncus fellowesgordoni
  - Bornean pygmy shrew, Suncus hosei
  - Hutu-Tutsi dwarf shrew, Suncus hututsi
  - Least dwarf shrew, Suncus infinitesimus
  - Greater dwarf shrew, Suncus lixa
  - Madagascan pygmy shrew, Suncus madagascariensis
  - Malayan pygmy shrew, Suncus malayanus
  - Climbing shrew, Suncus megalurus
  - Flores shrew, Suncus mertensi
  - Asian highland shrew, Suncus montanus
  - Asian house shrew, Suncus murinus
  - Remy's pygmy shrew, Suncus remyi
  - Anderson's shrew, Suncus stoliczkanus
  - Lesser dwarf shrew, Suncus varilla
  - Jungle shrew, Suncus zeylanicus
