= Zardak Peak =

Highest peak of the Kirthar Mountains of Pakistan

- Location within Pakistan

Highest point
- Elevation: 7,438 ft (2,267 m)
- Coordinates: 27°50′N 67°05′E

Geography
- Country: Pakistan
- State: Balochistan
- Parent range: Kirthar Range

Zardak Peak is the highest peak of the Kirthar Mountains, which are a far-southern extension of the Hindukush range. It is the most prominent mountain in Balochistan and is 7,438 feet (2,267 m) high. It is bordered to the east by the Indus plains, and to the west by the Iranian plateau.

== Summits ==
The mountain has never been summited due to its remoteness and inaccessibility.

== Geography ==
It is in the north of the mountain range, as well as on its eastern fringe, near where it descends quite suddenly to meet the plains covering much of the Indian subcontinent below the 30th parallel north. These plains are actually visible from the summit of the mountain. Tree lines are extremely high around 28 N (nearly 14,000 feet and some of the highest in the world), and Zardak Peak is far below it. The mountain is extremely inaccessible, as no proper roads have been built in the area. In order to reach the mountain, a quad must be used.

=== Climate ===
The climate of Zardak Peak is a cold desert (BWk) with extreme summer highs and extremely scant precipitation (years pass without any). The yearly mean maxima reach 114 °F (46 °C), and the area has never recorded a temperature at or below freezing. Elevation is the primary reason the mountain has a marginal cold-desert climate instead of a hot-desert climate (BWh). Although Zardak Peak is below the tree line, trees are rare due to the aridity, and the typical vegetation is thorny shrubland grading to moss and desert-hardy grass at higher altitudes.

== See also ==
- Indus River
- Karakoram Range
- Balochistan (Southwest Asia)
