= Black shrew =

Conservation status
- Data Deficient (IUCN 3.1)

Scientific classification
- Kingdom: Animalia
- Phylum: Chordata
- Class: Mammalia
- Order: Eulipotyphla
- Family: Soricidae
- Genus: Suncus
- Species: S. ater

Binomial name
- Suncus ater (Medway, 1965)
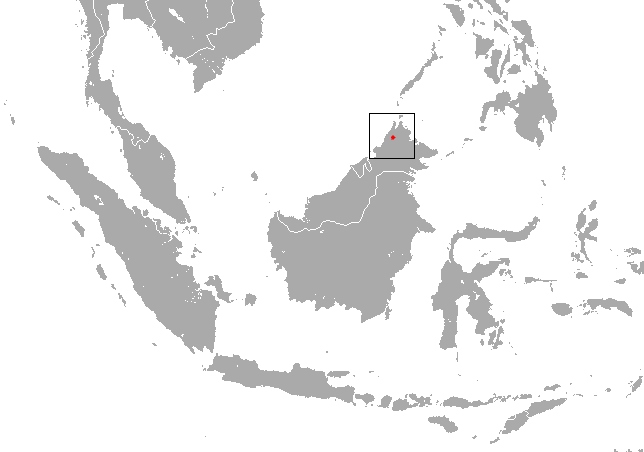
- Black shrew range

Species of mammal

The black shrew (Suncus ater) is a white-toothed shrew only known from Mount Kinabalu in the Malaysian state of Sabah on the island of Borneo.

It is known from a single specimen (holotype) which was collected in montane forest at 1,600 meters elevation.
