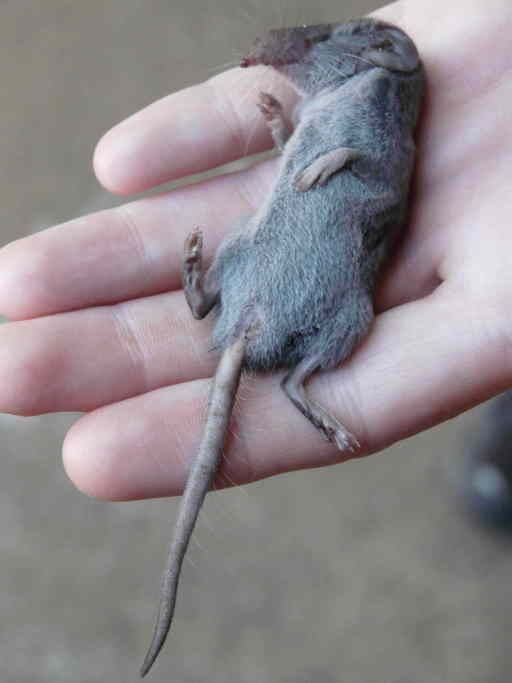
- dead specimen

Conservation status
- Least Concern (IUCN 3.1)

Scientific classification
- Kingdom: Animalia
- Phylum: Chordata
- Class: Mammalia
- Order: Eulipotyphla
- Family: Soricidae
- Genus: Suncus
- Species: S. lixa

Binomial name
- Suncus lixa (Thomas, 1898)
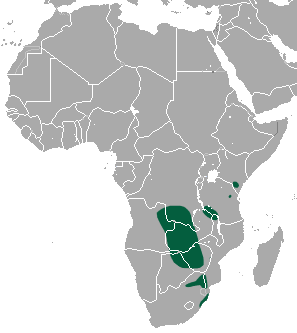
- Greater dwarf shrew range

= Greater dwarf shrew =

Species of mammal

The greater dwarf shrew (Suncus lixa) is a species of mammal in the family Soricidae. It is found in Angola, Botswana, Democratic Republic of the Congo, Kenya, Malawi, Namibia, Tanzania, Zambia, and Zimbabwe. Its natural habitats are subtropical or tropical dry forests and dry savanna. It is present in several protected areas, including the Kruger National Park. The main threat to greater dwarf shrews is the loss or degradation of moist, productive areas such as wetlands and rank grasslands within suitable habitat.
