= Least dwarf shrew =

Conservation status
- Least Concern (IUCN 3.1)

Scientific classification
- Kingdom: Animalia
- Phylum: Chordata
- Class: Mammalia
- Infraclass: Placentalia
- Order: Eulipotyphla
- Family: Soricidae
- Genus: Suncus
- Species: S. infinitesimus

Binomial name
- Suncus infinitesimus (Heller, 1912)
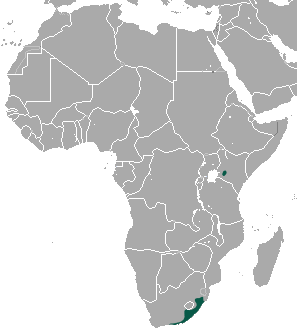
- Least dwarf shrew range

Species of mammal

The least dwarf shrew (Suncus infinitesimus) is a species of mammal in the family Soricidae. It is found in Cameroon, Central African Republic, Democratic Republic of the Congo, Kenya, Nigeria, South Africa, Eswatini, Tanzania, and Uganda. Its natural habitats are tropical or subtropical moist lowland and montane forests, dry grassland, and arable land.
