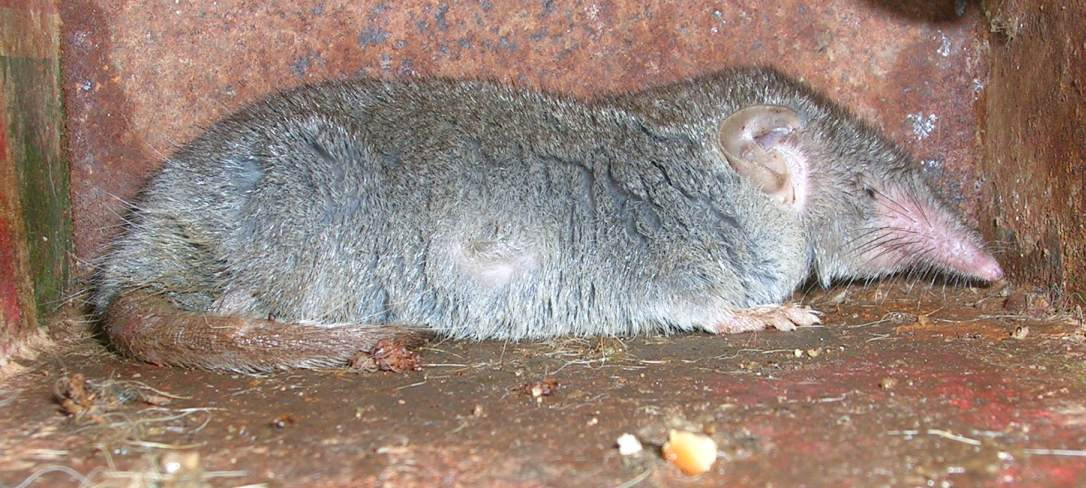

Conservation status
- Least Concern (IUCN 3.1)

Scientific classification
- Kingdom: Animalia
- Phylum: Chordata
- Class: Mammalia
- Infraclass: Placentalia
- Order: Eulipotyphla
- Family: Soricidae
- Genus: Suncus
- Species: S. murinus

Binomial name
- Suncus murinus (Linnaeus, 1766)
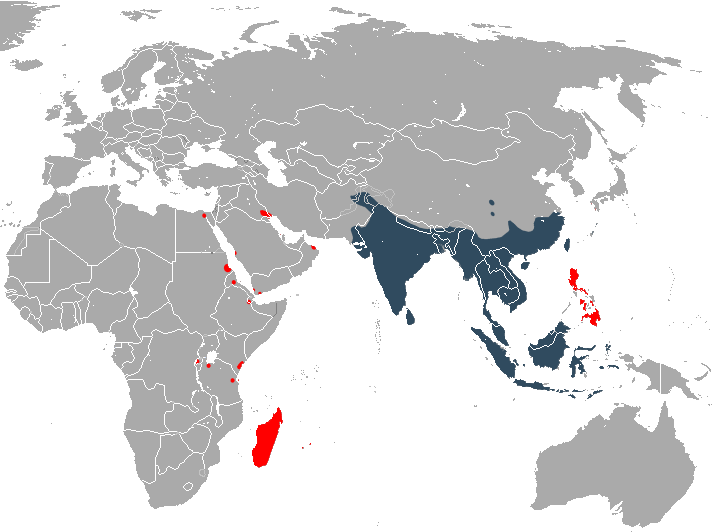
- Asian house shrew range (blue — native, red — introduced)

Synonyms
- Sorex murinus Linnaeus, 1766; Suncus sacer Ehrenberg, 1832

= Asian house shrew =

Species of shrew

The Asian house shrew (Suncus murinus) is a shrew species native to South and Southeast Asia that has been listed as Least Concern on the IUCN Red List since 2008 because of its large population and wide distribution. It has been introduced in several West Asian and East African countries. It is considered an invasive species and has been implicated in the demise of several island lizard species.

It is also called house shrew, grey musk shrew, Asian musk shrew or Indian musk shrew.

== Taxonomy ==
Sorex murinus was the scientific name proposed by Carl Linnaeus in 1766 for a house shrew from Java. In the late 18th to early 20th centuries, several house shrew zoological specimens were described as distinct species that are considered synonyms today:

- Sorex myosurus by Peter Simon Pallas in 1781;
- Sorex viridescens by Edward Blyth in 1859 was a house shrew from the Malabar coast, India;

== Description ==
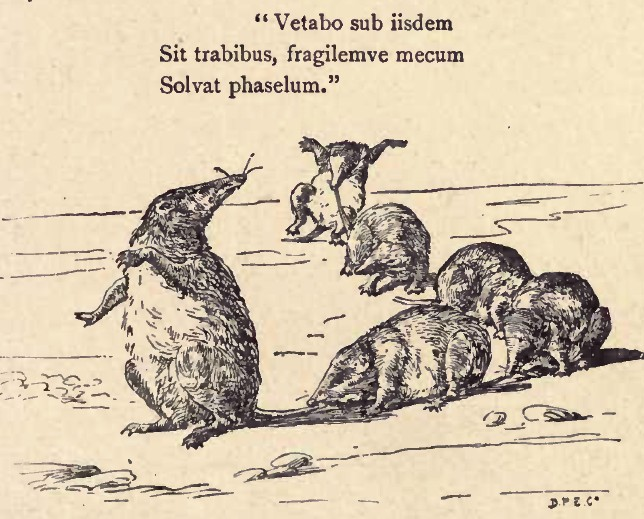
Illustration of the habit of travelling in family parties from Edward Hamilton Aitken

The house shrew has a uniform, short, dense fur of mid-grey to brownish-grey color. The tail is thick at the base and a bit narrower at the tip, and is covered with a few long, bristle-like hairs that are thinly scattered. They have short legs with five clawed toes. They have small external ears and an elongated snout. They also emit a strong odor of musk, derived from musk glands that are sometimes visible on each side of the body. The odor is especially noticeable during the breeding season.

Like all shrews, the Asian house shrew is plantigrade and long-nosed. The teeth are a series of sharp points which enable them to poke holes in insect exoskeletons. It is the largest of the shrew species, weighing between 50 and 100 g and being about 15 cm long from snout to tip of the tail.

== Distribution ==
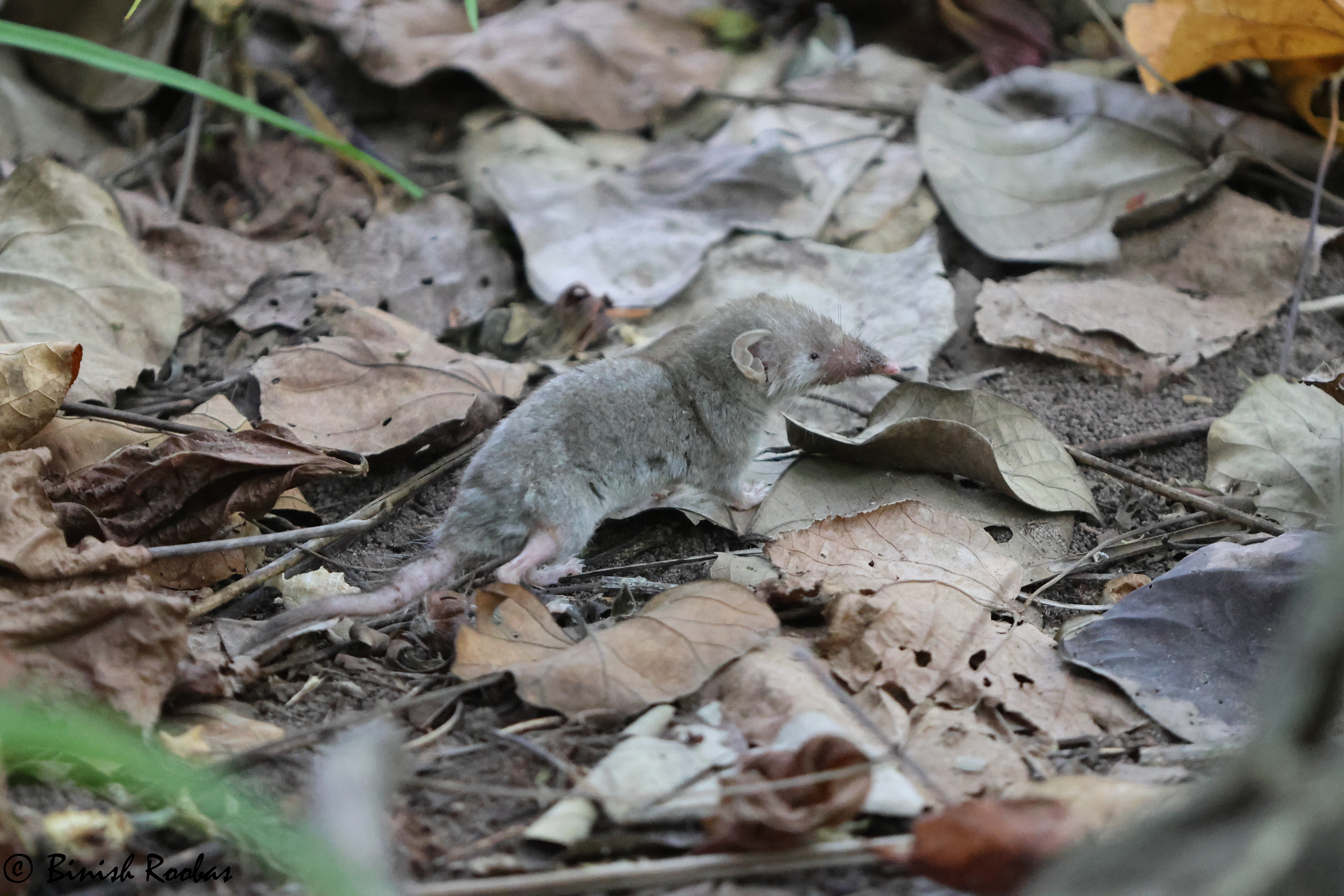
Asian house shrew in Maldives

The Asian house shrew is native to South and Southeast Asia and was introduced by humans to eastern Africa, Arabia, Madagascar, the Philippines and other islands in the Indian and Pacific Oceans.

== Ecology and behaviour ==
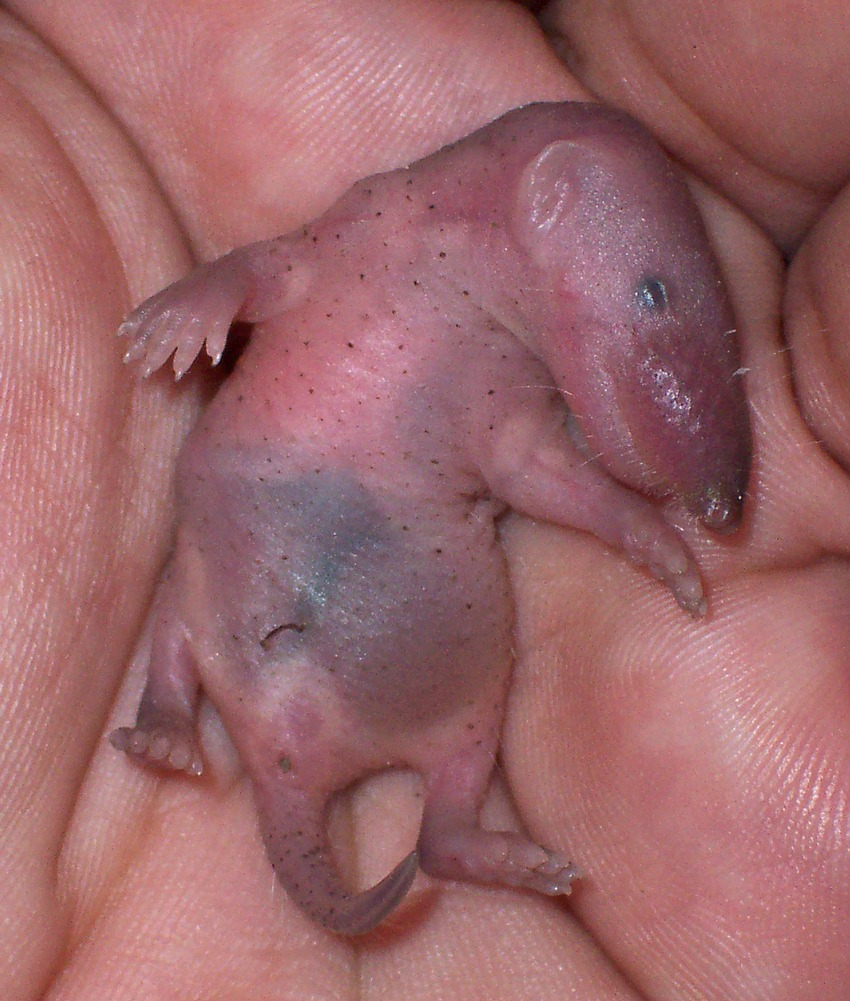
Baby house shrew

The Asian house shrew is a voracious insectivore with little resistance to starvation. It is active during the night, spending the day in a burrow or hiding place in human habitations. They breed throughout the year, with each female averaging two litters per year. The gestation period is one month. One to eight young are born per litter, usually three young, in a nest made by both of the parents, wherein the young stay until they are nearly adult. It starts breeding when it is around one year old.

Studies on this shrew have suggested its suitability for use in laboratory studies of reproduction and nutrition.

It is widespread and found in all habitats, including deserts and human habitations.

The house shrew has a habit of moving quickly along the edges of the walls when it enters human habitations. As it runs it makes a chattering sound which resembles the sound of jingling money, which has earned them the name "money shrew" in China. When alarmed, the house shrew makes an ear-piercing, high-pitched shriek, resembling the sound of nails scraping a chalkboard or a metal fork scraping glass, which repels house cats. Predators also leave the house shrew alone because of its musky smell and even when they catch one by mistake they will rarely eat it.

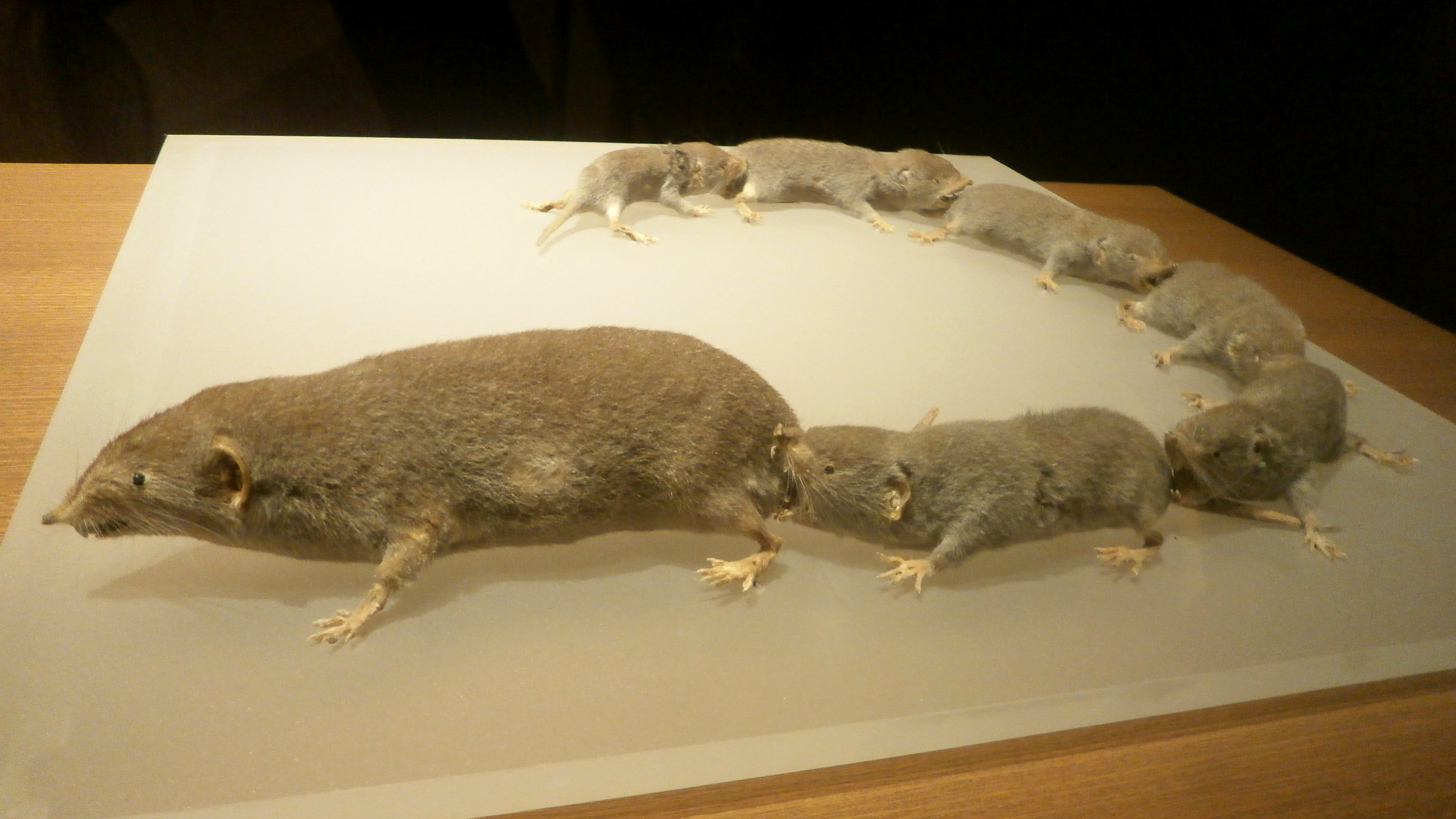
Stuffed specimens, exhibited in the National Museum of Nature and Science, Tokyo, Japan.

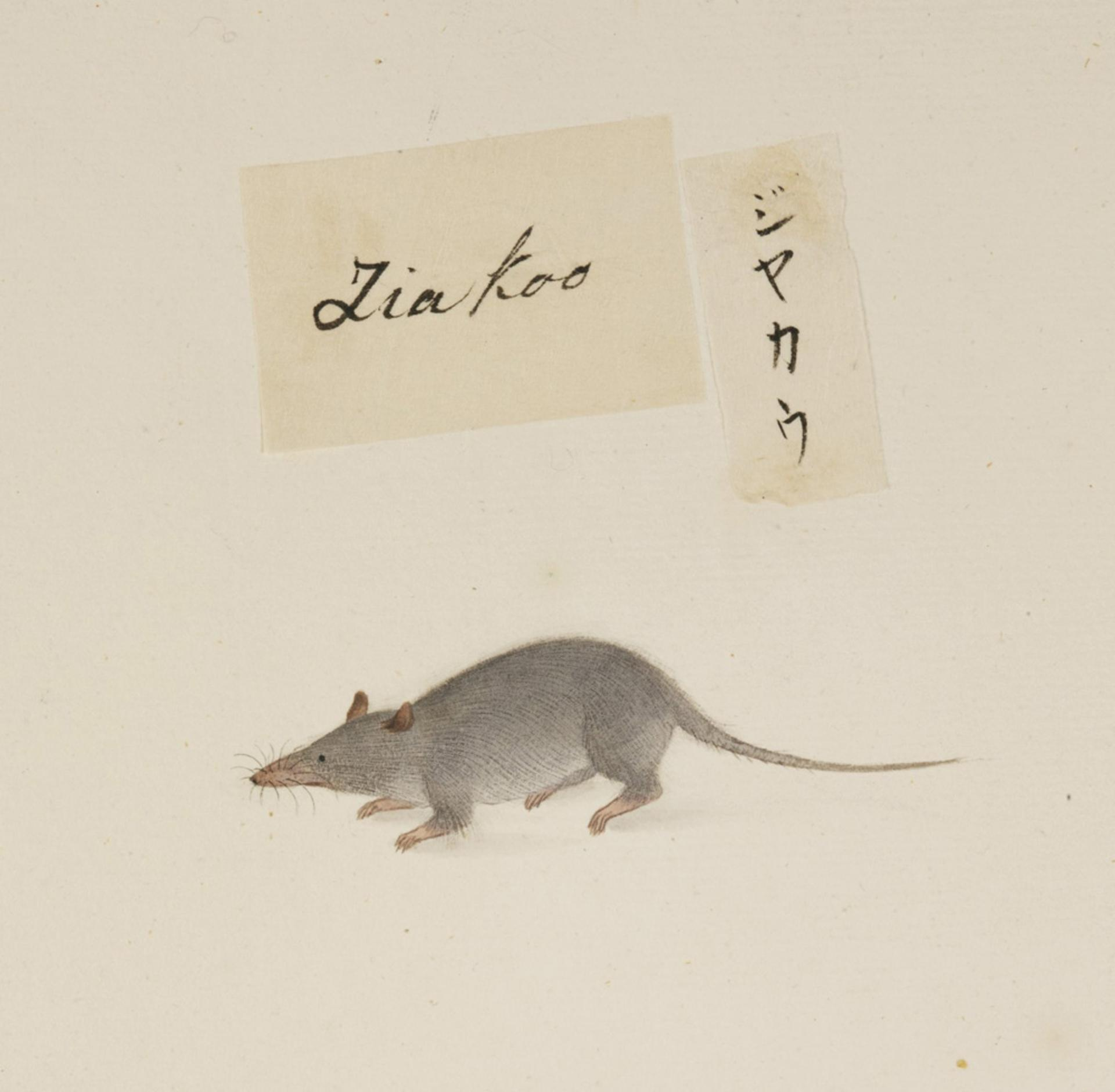
Coloured pencil drawing by Yūshi Ishizaki

Another habit of this shrew, shared with the white-toothed shrews of Europe, is that when a mother and its young travel the first will hold on to the mother's fur with its teeth, and the subsequent young will do the same with the sibling in front of it.

It is often mistaken for a rat or mouse and killed as vermin. In general it is beneficial to humans because its diet consists mostly of harmful insects (and other invertebrates) such as cockroaches and even mammals such as house mice, as well as plant material. It can therefore be considered as a biological pesticide. Unlike rats, population levels of house shrews remain low. Despite its use as an insect control, it can be unpopular due to the strong odour of its droppings, which it may deposit in human dwellings behind kitchen cupboards, etc. It can also take to eating human food such as meat in kitchens, or dog or cat food. It is known to occasionally kill young chicks, making it unpopular with farmers, although rats probably kill more chicks, and more quickly. The way it is said to attack chicks, by first biting a tendon, immobilizing it and then killing and eating it, could indicate that it has a venomous bite that paralyses, as at least two other shrews species have (i.e. the Eurasian water shrew and the Northern short-tailed shrew).

== In culture ==
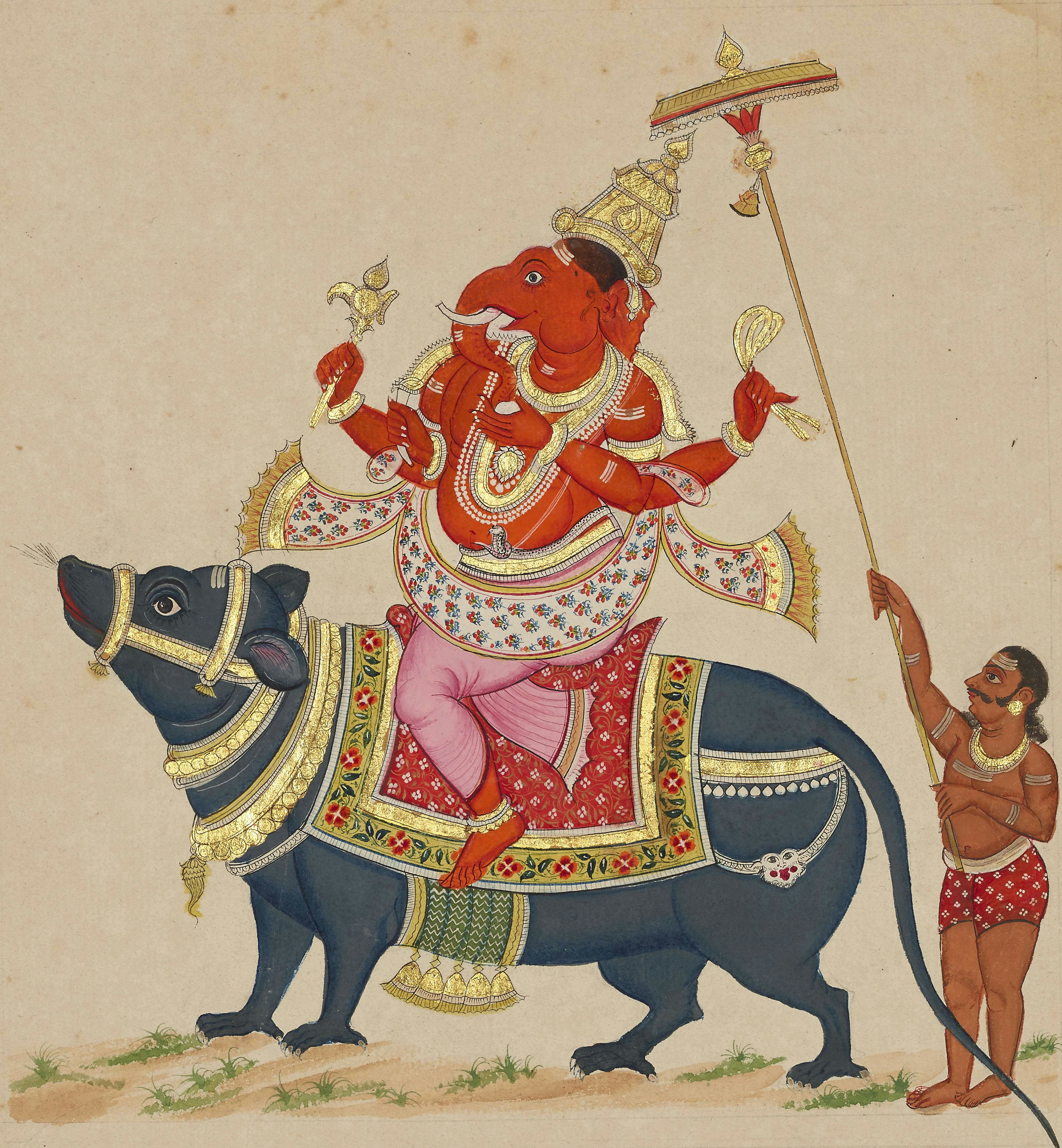
Pillaiyar on his vahana, the shrew flanked by a parasol wielding gana

In Shaiva Siddhanta, the Asian house shrew is the main vahana of Pillaiyar, and therefore it is sinful to kill one.
