= Gabar dams =

Series of walls and dams in Pakistan

Gabar dams, also known as the Gabarbands, are a series of walls and dams found in the Sindh and Balochistan provinces of Pakistan, constructed to store rainwater and divert the flow of rivers. Some of them date to the 4th and 3rd millennia BCE. There are around 15 such dams present in the Kirthar Mountains in the Sindh and Balochistan plateau.

== Gallery ==
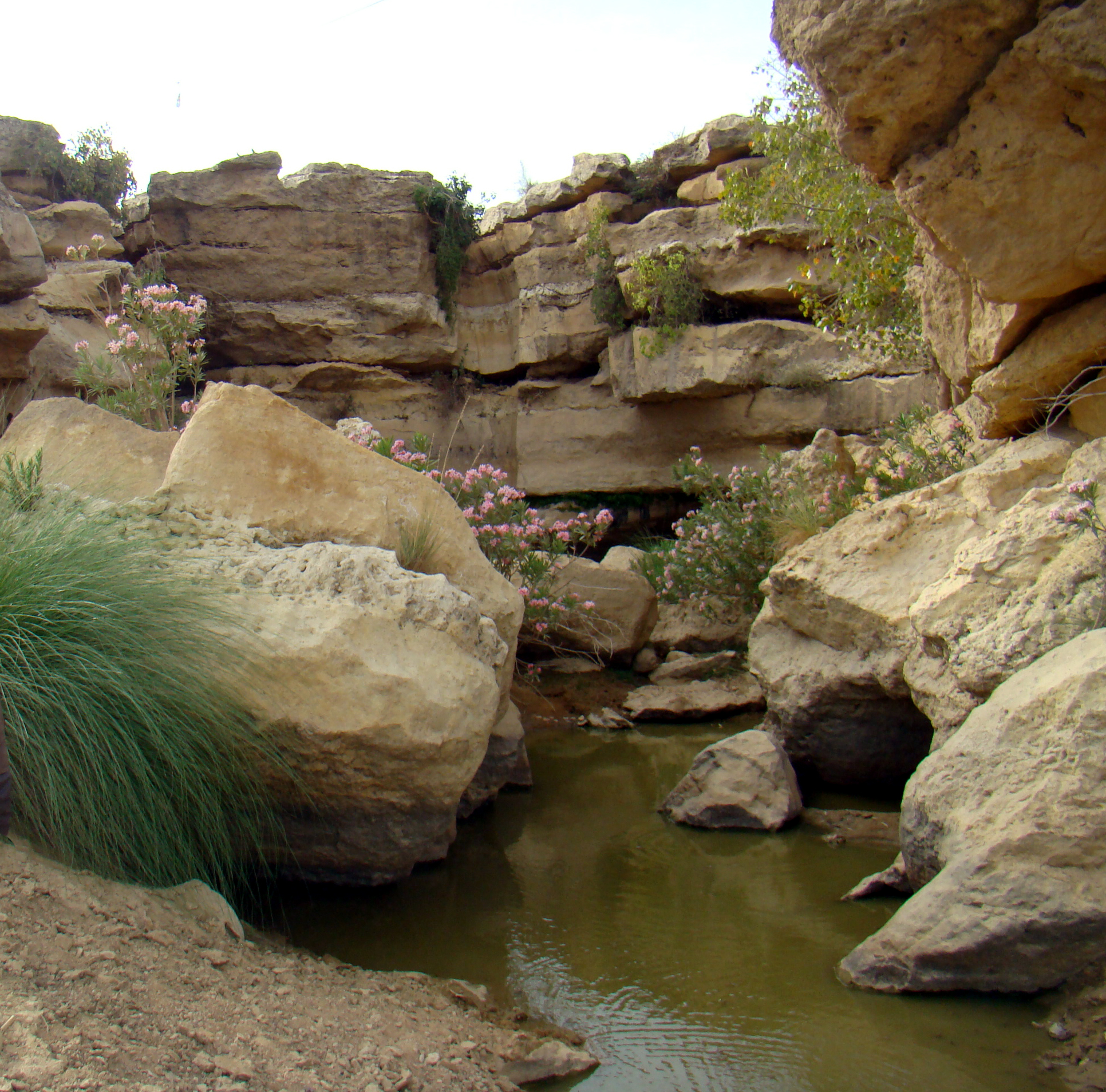

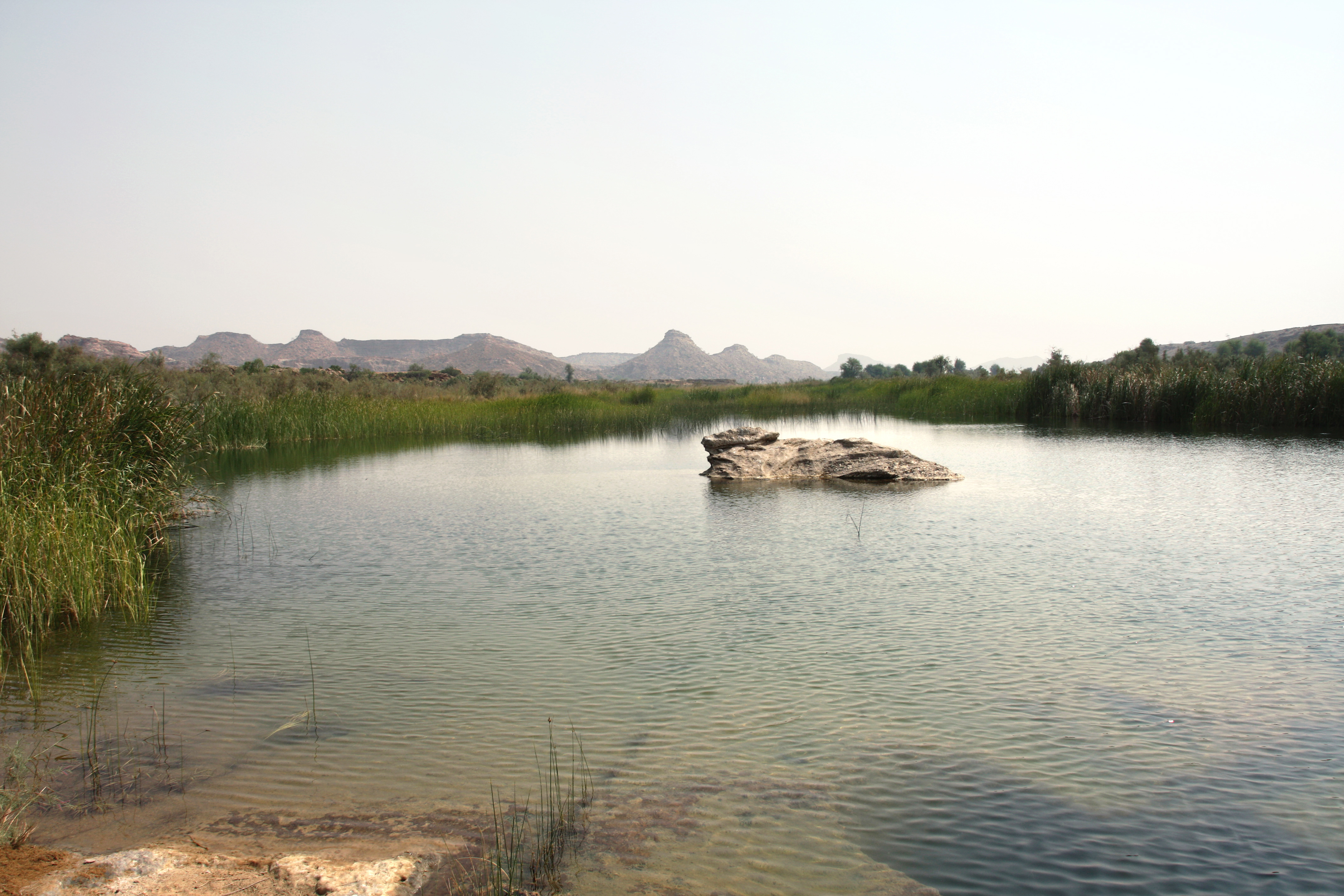

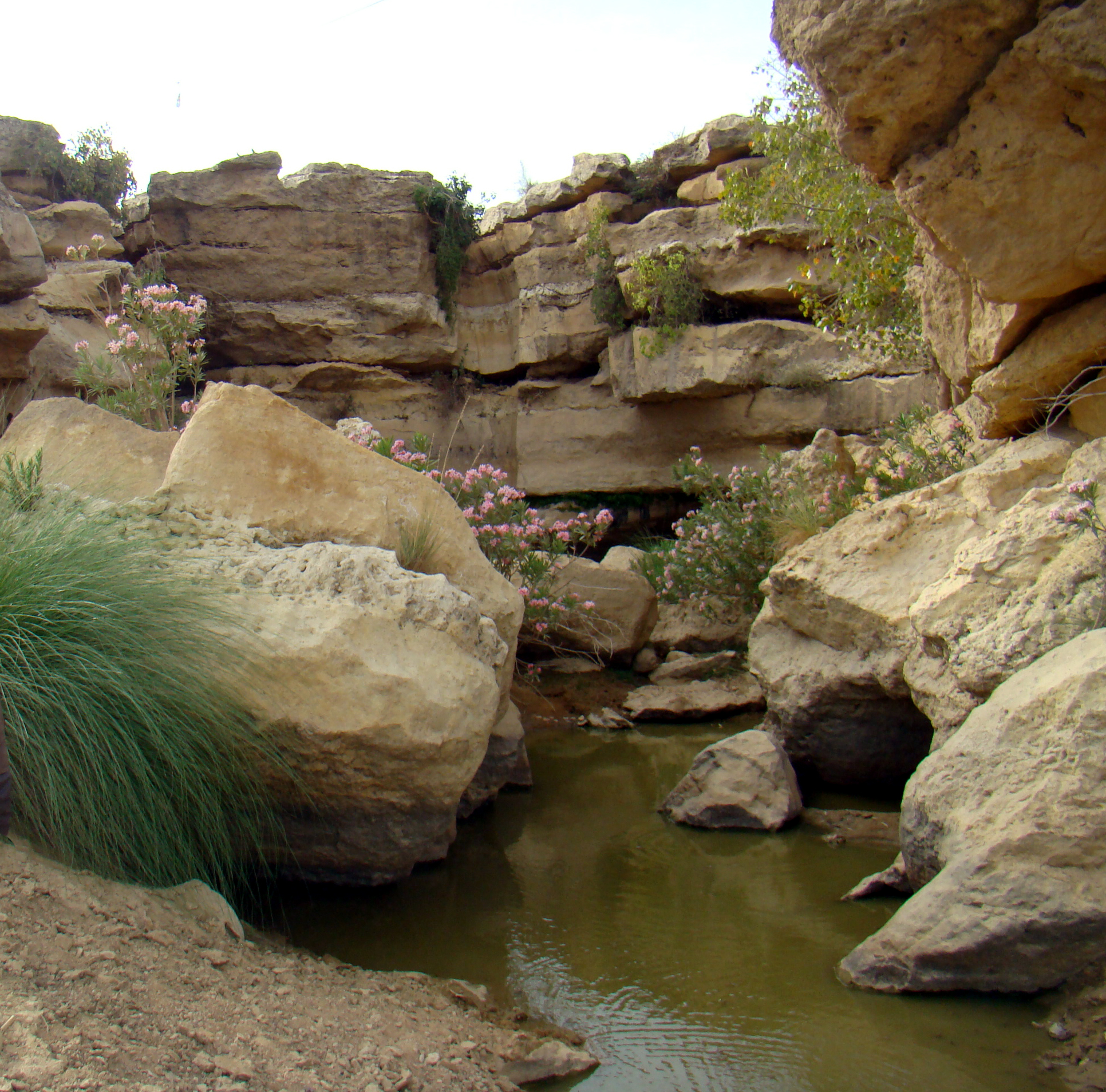
