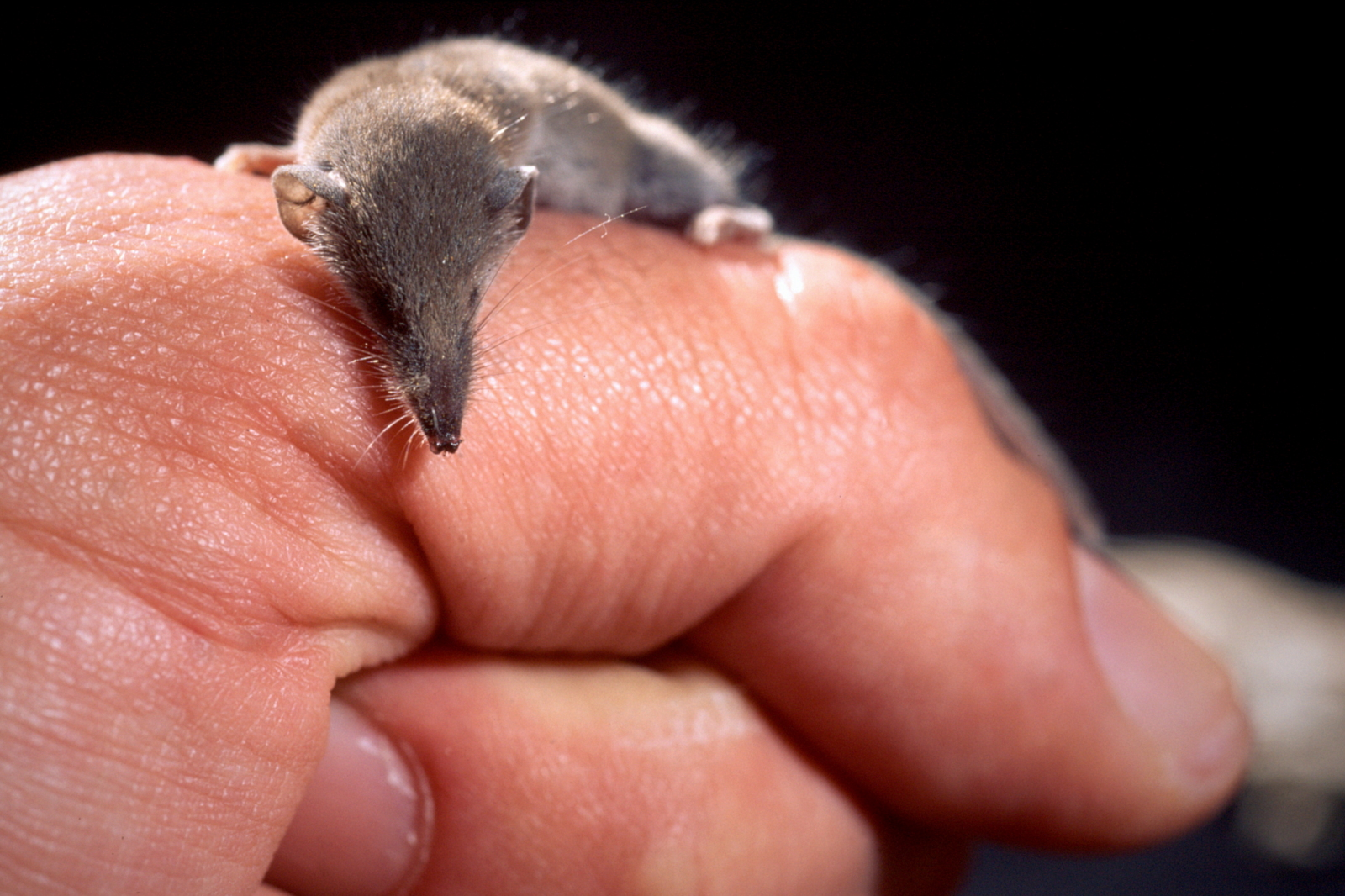

Conservation status
- Least Concern (IUCN 3.1)

Scientific classification
- Kingdom: Animalia
- Phylum: Chordata
- Class: Mammalia
- Order: Eulipotyphla
- Family: Soricidae
- Genus: Suncus
- Species: S. etruscus

Binomial name
- Suncus etruscus (Savi, 1822)
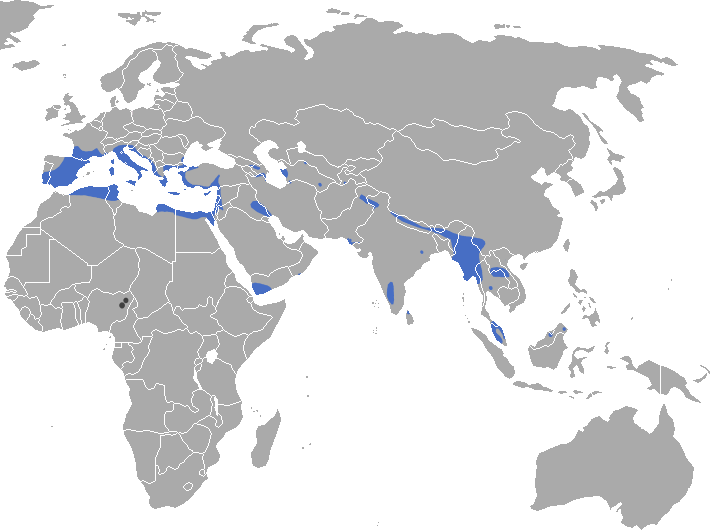
- Etruscan Shrew range (blue — native, black — probably extant origin uncertain)

= Etruscan shrew =

Species of mammal

The Etruscan shrew (Suncus etruscus), also known as the Etruscan pygmy shrew, white-toothed pygmy shrew and Savi's pygmy shrew, is the smallest known extant mammal by mass, weighing only about 1.8 g (0.063 oz) on average - as much as a paperclip. (The bumblebee bat is regarded as the smallest mammal by skull size and body length.)

The Etruscan shrew has a body length of about 4 cm (1.6 in) excluding the tail. It is characterized by very rapid movements and a fast metabolism, eating about 1.5–2 times its own body weight per day. It feeds on various small vertebrates and invertebrates, mostly insects, and can hunt individuals of the same size as itself. These shrews prefer warm and damp climates and are widely distributed in the belt between 10° and 45°N latitude stretching from Europe and North Africa to Malaysia. They are also found in the Maltese islands, situated in the middle of the Mediterranean Sea. Although widespread and not threatened overall, they are generally uncommon and are endangered in some countries.

== Description ==
The Etruscan shrew has a slender (not truncated) body, with a length between 3 and 5.2 cm (1.2 and 2.0 in) excluding the tail, which adds another 2.4 to 3.2 cm (0.94 to 1.26 in). The body mass varies between 1.3 g (0.046 oz) and 2.5 g (0.088 oz) and is usually about 1.8 g (0.063 oz). In comparison, the related greater white-toothed shrew can be twice as long and weighs four to five times more. The head is relatively large, with a long, mobile proboscis, and the hind limbs are relatively small. The ears are relatively large and protuberant. The Etruscan shrew has a very fast heart beating rate, up to 1511 beats/min (25 beats/s) and a relatively large heart muscle mass, 1.2% of body weight. The fur color on the back and sides is pale brown, but is light gray on the stomach. The fur becomes denser and thicker from fall through the winter. The shrew usually has 30 teeth, but the 4th upper intermediate tooth is very small (rudimentary), and is absent in some individuals. Near the mouth grow a dense array of short whiskers, which the shrew actively uses to search for prey, especially in the night. Dimorphism in body features between males and females is absent.

== Genomics ==
A chromosome-level genome assembly of Suncus etruscus was published in 2024. The primary genome assembly is approximately 2.5 Gb, organized into 22 chromosomes. It has a BUSCO completeness of 94.9% and contains 19,819 predicted protein-coding genes.

== Activity ==
Etruscan shrews live alone except during mating periods. Their lifespan is estimated at typically around two years, but with a large uncertainty. They protect their territories by making chirping noises and signs of aggressiveness. They tend to groom themselves constantly when not eating, and are always moving when awake and not hiding. The hiding periods are short, and typically last less than half an hour. Clicking sounds are heard when these shrews are moving, which cease when they rest. The shrews are more active during the night when they make long trips; during the day, they stay near the nest or in a hiding place. They reach their maximum level of activity at dawn.

Due to its small size and consequent high surface-area-to-volume ratio, the Etruscan shrew is at a constant risk of hypothermia, and would quickly die of hypothermia if not for its extremely rapid metabolism. Its skeletal muscles contract at a rate of about 13 contractions/sec during respiration alone. In cold seasons and during shortages of food, the shrews lower their body temperatures down to about 12 °C (54 °F) and enter a state of temporary hibernation to reduce energy consumption. Recovery from this state is accompanied by shivering at a frequency of 58 muscle contractions/sec. This induces heating at a rate of up to 0.83 °C/min, which is among the highest values recorded in mammals; the heart rate increases with time from 100 to 800–1200 beats/min, and the respiratory rate rises linearly from 50 to 600–800 breaths/min.

Etruscan shrews mate primarily from March to October, though they can be pregnant at any time of the year. Pairs usually form in the spring and may tolerate each other and their young for some time at the nest. The gestation period is 27–28 days, and they have 2–6 cubs per litter. Cubs are born naked and blind, weighing only 0.2 g (0.0071 oz). After their eyes open at 14 to 16 days old, they mature quickly. The mother usually moves the young when they are 9 to 10 days old, and if disturbed, she relocates them by leading them with her tail in a train-like formation, a behaviour known as caravanning, with each cub biting the tail of the one in front. The young Etruscan shrews are weaned at 20 days old. By three to four weeks of age, the young are independent and are soon sexually mature.

== Distribution ==
The Etruscan shrew inhabits a belt extending between 10° and 40°N latitude across Eurasia. In Southern Europe, it has been found in Albania, Bosnia and Herzegovina, Bulgaria, Croatia, Cyprus, France, North Macedonia, Malta, Montenegro, Greece, Italy, Portugal, Slovenia, Spain, and Turkey, with unconfirmed reports in Andorra, Gibraltar and Monaco. It has been introduced by humans to some European islands, such as Mallorca and the Canary Islands.

The shrew also occurs in North Africa (Algeria, Egypt, Libya, Morocco, Tunisia) and around the Arabian Peninsula (Bahrain, Israel, Jordan, Lebanon, Oman, Syria, and Yemen including Socotra). In Asia, it was observed in Afghanistan, Azerbaijan, Bhutan, China (Gengma County only), Myanmar, Georgia, India, Iran, Iraq, Kazakhstan, Laos, Malaysia (Malaysian part of Borneo island), Nepal, Pakistan, Philippines, Sri Lanka, Tajikistan, Thailand, Turkey, Turkmenistan and Vietnam. There are unconfirmed reports of the Etruscan shrew in West and East Africa (Guinea, Nigeria, Ethiopia) and in Armenia, Brunei, Indonesia, Kuwait and Uzbekistan.

Overall the species is widespread and not threatened, but its density is generally lower than of the other shrews living in the area. In some regions it is rare, especially in Azerbaijan, Georgia, Jordan and Kazakhstan (included into the Red Book).

== Habitat ==
The Etruscan shrew favors warm and damp habitats covered with shrubs, which it uses to hide from predators. Areas where open terrain such as grasslands and scrub meet deciduous forests are usually inhabited. It can be found at sea level but is usually confined to the foothills and lower belts of mountain ranges, though has been found up to 3,000 m (9,800 ft) above sea level. It colonizes riparian thickets along the banks of lakes and rivers, as well as human-cultivated areas (abandoned gardens, orchards, vineyards, olive groves and edges of fields). The shrew, however, avoids intensively cultivated areas, as well as dense forests and sand dunes. It is poorly adapted to digging burrows, so it arranges its nests in various natural shelters, crevices and others' uninhabited burrows. They frequent rocks, boulders, stone walls and ruins, darting quickly in and out between them.

== Hunting and feeding ==
Because of its high ratio of surface area to body volume, the Etruscan shrew has an extremely fast metabolism and must eat 1.5–2.0 times its body weight in food per day. It feeds mostly on various invertebrates, including insects, larvae and earthworms, as well as the young of amphibians, lizards and rodents, and can hunt prey of nearly the same body size as itself. It prefers species with a soft, thin exoskeleton, so it avoids ants when given a choice. Grasshoppers, where common, are often regular prey. It kills large prey by a bite to the head and eats it immediately, but takes small insects back to its nest. If it eats nothing for only four hours, it starves to death. When hunting, it relies mostly on its sense of touch rather than vision, and may even run into its food at night.

== Predators and threats ==
The largest threat to Etruscan shrews originates from human activities, particularly destruction of their nesting grounds and habitats as a result of farming. Etruscan shrews are also sensitive to weather changes, such as cold winters and dry periods. Major predators are birds of prey.

== See also ==
- Smallest organisms
