= Remy's pygmy shrew =

Conservation status
- Least Concern (IUCN 3.1)

Scientific classification
- Kingdom: Animalia
- Phylum: Chordata
- Class: Mammalia
- Order: Eulipotyphla
- Family: Soricidae
- Genus: Suncus
- Species: S. remyi

Binomial name
- Suncus remyi Brosset, DuBost & Heim de Balsac, 1965
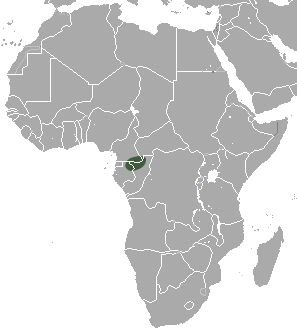
- Remy's pygmy shrew range

Species of mammal

Remy's pygmy shrew (Suncus remyi) is a species of mammal in the family Soricidae. It is found in Cameroon, the Central African Republic, the Republic of the Congo, and Gabon. Its natural habitat is subtropical or tropical moist lowland forests.
