= Sindh Wildlife Department =

Government agency in Pakistan

Agency overview
- Jurisdiction: Sindh, Pakistan
- Agency executive: Javed Ahmed Mahar (Since 2018), Conservator Wildlife
- Website: http://sindhwildlife.gos.pk

The Sindh Wildlife Department is a government agency in Sindh, Pakistan that focuses on promoting and raising awareness about wildlife and biodiversity in the region.

== Background ==
The department operates under the Sindh Wildlife Protection, Preservation, Conservation and Management Act of 2020. This act was created to provide for the protection, conservation, preservation and sustainable use of wildlife and to establish, manage and maintain protected areas in the Province of Sindh.

== Council for Conservation of Wildlife ==
The Sindh Council for Conservation of Wildlife has been established by the government. The council’s responsibilities include providing vision and guidance for the sustainability of wildlife; promoting cooperation, coordination and collaboration among wildlife stakeholders; organizing awareness campaigns and seminars; and raising funds for wildlife improvement.
